= List of Paramount Pictures films (1960–1969) =

The following is a list of films originally produced and/or distributed theatrically by Paramount Pictures and released in the 1960s.

== 1960 ==
Release date	Title	Notes
February 4, 1960	Visit to a Small Planet	
February 17, 1960	The Big Night	
February 17, 1960	Jack the Ripper	U.S. distribution only with Embassy Pictures, produced in United Kingdom by Mid-Century Film Productions
March 1, 1960	Heller in Pink Tights	
March 15, 1960	Five Branded Women	
March 16, 1960	A Touch of Larceny	
April 7, 1960	Conspiracy of Hearts	
April 29, 1960	Chance Meeting	
May 1960	Prisoner of the Volga	
June 1, 1960	Walk Like a Dragon	
June 16, 1960	Psycho (Note: Owned by Universal Pictures)	Theatrical distribution only; Inducted into the National Film Registry in 1992
July 10, 1960	The Rat Race	
July 20, 1960	The Bellboy	
July 20, 1960	Tarzan the Magnificent (Note: Owned by Warner Bros.)	Distribution only
July 27, 1960	Circus Stars	
August 7, 1960	It Started in Naples	
September 2, 1960	The Boy Who Stole a Million	distribution only
September 15, 1960	Under Ten Flags	
November 4, 1960	G.I. Blues	
November 10, 1960	The World of Suzie Wong	
November 22, 1960	Cinderfella	
December 16, 1960	A Breath of Scandal	

== 1961 ==
Release date	Title	Notes
February 1, 1961	Blueprint for Robbery	
February 15, 1961	The Savage Innocents	
February 15, 1961	Foxhole in Cairo	
March 22, 1961	All in a Night's Work	
March 30, 1961	One-Eyed Jacks	distribution only; Inducted into the National Film Registry in 2018
May 19, 1961	On the Double	
June 1, 1961	The Pleasure of His Company	
June 21, 1961	In the Wake of a Stranger	
June 28, 1961	The Ladies Man	
July 12, 1961	Love in a Goldfish Bowl	
September 2, 1961	Blood and Roses	
September 20, 1961	Man-Trap	
October 5, 1961	Breakfast at Tiffany's	Inducted into the National Film Registry in 2012
November 16, 1961	Summer and Smoke	
November 22, 1961	Blue Hawaii	
November 28, 1961	The Errand Boy	
December 31, 1961	Hey, Let's Twist!	

== 1962 ==
Release date	Title	Notes
January 31, 1962	Siege of Syracuse	
February 28, 1962	Too Late Blues	
March 27, 1962	Forever My Love	
March 1962	Brushfire	
April 17, 1962	The Counterfeit Traitor	
April 22, 1962	The Man Who Shot Liberty Valance	Inducted into the National Film Registry in 2007
May 23, 1962	Escape from Zahrain	
June 13, 1962	My Geisha	
June 19, 1962	Hatari!	
June 20, 1962	The Pigeon That Took Rome	
June 26, 1962	Hell Is for Heroes	
October 24, 1962	Wonderful to Be Young (Note: Currently owned by StudioCanal)	U.S. and Canadian distribution only
November 21, 1962	Girls! Girls! Girls!	
November 21, 1962	It's Only Money	
December 25, 1962	Who's Got the Action?	
December 27, 1962	A Girl Named Tamiko	

== 1963 ==
Release date	Title	Notes
March 6, 1963	Papa's Delicate Condition	
April 3, 1963	My Six Loves	
May 29, 1963	Hud	Inducted into the National Film Registry in 2018
June 4, 1963	The Nutty Professor	Inducted into the National Film Registry in 2004
June 5, 1963	Come Blow Your Horn	
June 12, 1963	Donovan's Reef	
June 1963	Duel of the Titans	
August 28, 1963	Paris Pick-up	
August 28, 1963	Wives and Lovers	
October 17, 1963	All the Way Home	
October 30, 1963	A New Kind of Love	
November 27, 1963	Fun in Acapulco	
November 27, 1963	Who's Minding the Store?	
December 25, 1963	Who's Been Sleeping in My Bed?	
December 25, 1963	Love with the Proper Stranger	

== 1964 ==
Release date	Title	Notes
February 12, 1964	Seven Days in May	Distribution only
March 11, 1964	Becket	Nominee for the Academy Award for Best Picture
March 26, 1964	The Fall of the Roman Empire (Note: Owned by the estate of Samuel Bronston, with distribution rights presumably licensed to either Spyglass Media Group or Lionsgate)	USA theatrical distribution
April 8, 1964	Paris When It Sizzles	
April 9, 1964	The Carpetbaggers	co-production with Embassy Pictures
May 13, 1964	Law of the Lawless	
May 13, 1964	The Son of Captain Blood	
May 28, 1964	Ring of Treason	
June 25, 1964	Circus World	
June 1964	Robinson Crusoe on Mars	
July 8, 1964	Lady in a Cage	
August 12, 1964	The Patsy	
November 2, 1964	Where Love Has Gone	co-production with Embassy Pictures
November 10, 1964	Stage to Thunder Rock	
November 11, 1964	Roustabout	
December 16, 1964	The Disorderly Orderly	

== 1965 ==
Release date	Title	Notes
February 10, 1965	Sylvia	
February 12, 1965	Walk a Tightrope	U.S. distribution only: movie produced by Associated Producers and distributed in the UK by British Lion Films
February 28, 1965	Dr. Terror's House of Horrors	U.S. distribution only: movie produced by Amicus Productions and distributed in the UK by Regal Films International
February 1965	Young Fury	
April 6, 1965	In Harm's Way	
April 15, 1965	Crack in the World	
May 12, 1965	The Girls on the Beach	
May 12, 1965	A Boy Ten Feet Tall	
May 26, 1965	The Amorous Adventures of Moll Flanders	
June 1, 1965	Black Spurs	
June 23, 1965	Harlow	co-production with Embassy Pictures and Prometheus Enterprises Inc.
June 24, 1965	The Sons of Katie Elder	
July 1, 1965	The Family Jewels	
July 7, 1965	Town Tamer	
August 25, 1965	The Skull	British film
September 22, 1965	The Mad Executioners	West German film
September 29, 1965	Beach Ball	
September 1965	The Revenge of Spartacus	
October 13, 1965	Situation Hopeless... But Not Serious	
November 9, 1965	Red Line 7000	
November 24, 1965	Sands of the Kalahari	British film
November 1965	Seven Slaves Against the World	
December 16, 1965	The Spy Who Came in from the Cold	British film
December 22, 1965	Boeing Boeing	
December 23, 1965	The Slender Thread	
December 29, 1965	Apache Uprising	

== 1966 ==
Release date	Title	Notes
January 1, 1966	Kid Rodelo	
January 20, 1966	Judith	
February 22, 1966	Promise Her Anything	
March 9, 1966	Johnny Reno	
April 20, 1966	The Night of the Grizzly	
May 20, 1966	The Psychopath	British film
May 25, 1966	The Last of the Secret Agents?	
June 14, 1966	The Naked Prey	
June 15, 1966	Paradise, Hawaiian Style	
June 15, 1966	Assault on a Queen	
June 29, 1966	Nevada Smith	co-production with Solar Productions
August 3, 1966	This Property Is Condemned	
August 10, 1966	The Idol	co-production with Embassy Pictures
August 24, 1966	Alfie	Nominee for the Academy Award for Best Picture
September 1, 1966	Waco	
September 29, 1966	Bolshoi Ballet '67	
October 5, 1966	Seconds	Inducted into the National Film Registry in 2015
November 10, 1966	Is Paris Burning?	
November 14, 1966	The Swinger	
December 22, 1966	Funeral in Berlin	
December 28, 1966	Drop Dead Darling	

== 1967 ==
Release date	Title	Notes
1967	Island of the Lost	
January 1, 1967	Red Tomahawk	
January 18, 1967	Warning Shot	
February 9, 1967	Hurry Sundown	
February 15, 1967	Oh Dad, Poor Dad, Mamma's Hung You in the Closet and I'm Feelin' So Sad	
March 1, 1967	Hired Killer	
March 3, 1967	C'mon, Let's Live a Little	co-production with All-Star Pictures and Hertlandy Associates
March 12, 1967	The Busy Body	
March 22, 1967	Easy Come, Easy Go	
May 3, 1967	The Vulture	
May 19, 1967	The Deadly Bees	
May 24, 1967	The Caper of the Golden Bulls	co-production with Embassy Pictures
May 25, 1967	Barefoot in the Park	
May 1967	Africa Texas Style	
June 28, 1967	Gunn	
June 28, 1967	The Sea Pirate	
June 30, 1967	El Dorado	
July 23, 1967	Chuka	
July 26, 1967	The Upper Hand	
July 1967	The Spirit Is Willing	
July 1967	Hostile Guns	
September 1967	Tarzan and the Great River	
September 1967	Two Weeks in September	
September 1967	Fort Utah	
October 3, 1967	The Penthouse	
October 10, 1967	Waterhole#3	
October 25, 1967	Gentle Giant	
November 1967	The Last Safari	British film
December 18, 1967	The Stranger	
December 20, 1967	Smashing Time (Note: Owned by Disney (via ABC))	British film; distribution only; produced by Selmur Pictures
December 21, 1967	The President's Analyst	

== 1968 ==
Release date	Title	Notes
1968	The Omegans	
1968	Rogues' Gallery	
January 24, 1968	Sebastian	
February 20, 1968	Grand Slam	
February 20, 1968	Half a Sixpence	
February 26, 1968	Treasure of San Gennaro	
March 15, 1968	Up the Junction	British film
March 20, 1968	No Way to Treat a Lady	
March 22, 1968	The Diary of an Innocent Boy	
March 27, 1968	Arizona Bushwhackers	
April 10, 1968	Will Penny	
April 19, 1968	Daring Game	
May 1, 1968	Tarzan and the Jungle Boy	
May 10, 1968	Blue	
May 16, 1968	The Odd Couple	
May 28, 1968	The Long Day's Dying	
May 29, 1968	Villa Rides	
May 1968	Project X	
May 1968	Fever Heat	
May 1968	Buckskin	
May 1968	Danger: Diabolik	French/Italian co-production
June 12, 1968	Rosemary's Baby	Inducted into the National Film Registry in 2014
June 23, 1968	Inadmissible Evidence	British film, co-owned by StudioCanal and Metro-Goldwyn-Mayer
July 10, 1968	5 Card Stud	
July 23, 1968	Isabel	
July 24, 1968	The Strange Affair	
August 14, 1968	Targets	
August 16, 1968	Bandits in Milan	Italy
September 4, 1968	Anyone Can Play	
September 13, 1968	The Bliss of Mrs. Blossom	
October 8, 1968	Romeo and Juliet	Nominee for the Academy Award for Best Picture
October 10, 1968	Barbarella	
October 23, 1968	Only When I Larf	
November 1, 1968	Once Upon a Time in the West	Italy: co by Rafran Cinematografica and Euro International Film Inducted into the National Film Registry in 2009
December 20, 1968	Skidoo	
December 25, 1968	Up Tight!	
December 1968	The Brotherhood	

== 1969 ==
Release date	Title	Notes
1969	A Talent for Loving	
January 15, 1969	Riot	co-production with William Castle Productions
March 7, 1969	if....	British
March 21, 1969	The Assassination Bureau	British
April 3, 1969	Goodbye, Columbus	
May 15, 1969	Fraulein Doktor	
June 13, 1969	Those Daring Young Men in Their Jaunty Jalopies	British
June 18 1969	Where's Jack?	British
June 25, 1969	My Side of the Mountain	
June 25, 1969	Hello Down There	
July 4, 1969	True Grit	
July 16, 1969	The Red Tent	Co Produced By Mosfilm
July 18, 1969	Dance of Death	British
August 27, 1969	Medium Cool	Inducted into the National Film Registry in 2003
September 3, 1969	The Italian Job	British
September 3, 1969	Ace High	
October 3, 1969	Oh! What a Lovely War	
October 15, 1969	Paint Your Wagon	co-production with Alan Jay Lerner Productions
October 22, 1969	The Sterile Cuckoo	
October 22, 1969	Adalen 31	Nominee for the Academy Award for Best Foreign Language Film. U.S. distribution only.
November 6, 1969	Downhill Racer	
November 14, 1969	The Brain	France: co produced by Gaumont
