= Chuck Hicks =

American actor and stuntman (1927–2021)

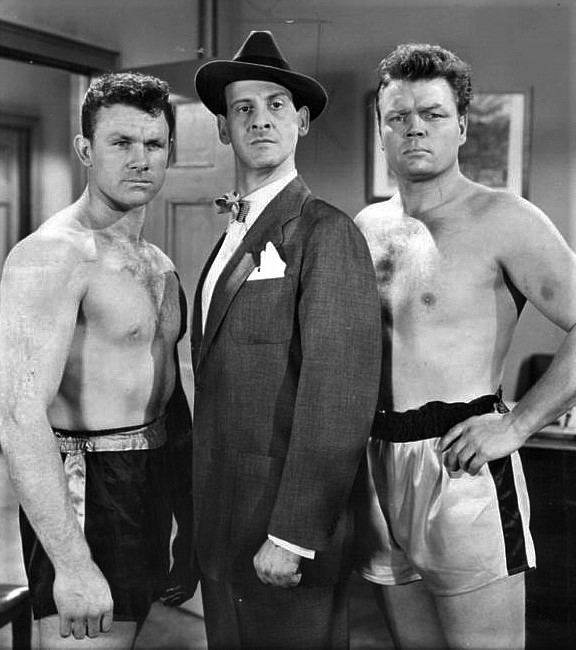
- Hicks (left) with Hans Conried and Hal Baylor in Schlitz Playhouse of Stars (1955)
- Born: Charles Dallas Hicks; December 26, 1927; Stockton, California, U.S.
- Died: May 4, 2021 (aged 93); Las Vegas, Nevada, U.S.
- Occupations: Actor; stuntman
- Website: chuckhicks.com

Charles Dallas Hicks (December 26, 1927 – May 4, 2021) was an American actor and stuntman.

== Early life and career ==
Hicks attended Burbank High School, where he was senior class president in 1946 and played football.

During World War II, Hicks served in the U.S. Merchant Marine and later in the Navy. While in the Navy, he was the boxing champ of the United States Fifth Fleet. He also attended Loyola Marymount University, where he played football and boxed, and later inducted into the school's Athletes Hall of Fame. He also played semi-pro football for the Eagle Rock Athletic Club.

== Death ==
Hicks died in Las Vegas, Nevada, on May 4, 2021, at the age of 93. His son said that his cause of death was complications from a stroke he had suffered at the end of 2020.

== Selected filmography ==
- She's Working Her Way Through College (1952) - Football Player (uncredited)
- Francis Goes to West Point (1952) - minor role (uncredited)
- The Rose Bowl Story (1952) - Fowler (uncredited)
- Horizons West (1952) - Barfly (uncredited)
- Angel Face (1953) - Nightclub Patron (uncredited)
- Lili (1953) - Carnival Patron (uncredited)
- Gentlemen Prefer Blondes (1953) - Olympic Team Member (uncredited)
- The Caddy (1953) - Caddy (uncredited)
- Casanova's Big Night (1954) - Assistant Headsman (uncredited)
- River of No Return (1954) - Prospector (uncredited)
- White Christmas (1954) - Anniversary Party Guest (uncredited)
- Battle Cry (1955) - Marine in Hospital (uncredited)
- Blackboard Jungle (1955) - Applicant (uncredited)
- Creature with the Atom Brain (1955) - Pilot (uncredited)
- Rebel Without a Cause (1955) - Ambulance Attendant (uncredited)
- Around the World in 80 Days (1956) - Minor Role (uncredited)
- The Girl He Left Behind (1956) - Minor Role (uncredited)
- Zombies of Mora Tau (1957) - Zombie (uncredited)
- Designing Woman (1957) - Galatos (uncredited)
- Gunfire at Indian Gap (1957) - Deputy
- Onionhead (1958) - Minor Role (uncredited)
- The Last Hurrah (1958) - Fighter (uncredited)
- Home Before Dark (1958) - Male Attendant (uncredited)
- The Perfect Furlough (1958) - Soldier (uncredited)
- Up Periscope (1959) - Sailor (uncredited)
- The Untouchables (1959, TV series) - LaMarr Kane
- Ice Palace (1960) - Doughboy (uncredited)
- The Bramble Bush (1960) - State Trooper (uncredited)
- Sunrise at Campobello (1960) - Policeman (uncredited)
- A Fever in the Blood (1961) - Bailiff (uncredited)
- All Hands on Deck (1961) - Sailor (uncredited)
- Alfred Hitchcock Presents (1962, TV series, season 7 episode 26: "Ten O'Clock Tiger") - Gypsy Joe
- Merrill's Marauders (1962) - Corporal Doskis
- Hell Is for Heroes (1962) - Wounded Prisoner (uncredited)
- Black Gold (1962) - Bartender (uncredited)
- Days of Wine and Roses (1962) - Attendant (uncredited)
- PT 109 (1963) - Cook (uncredited)
- Shock Corridor (1963) - Tough Attendant
- The Man from Galveston (1963) - U.S. Marshal Chuck (uncredited)
- 4 for Texas (1963) - Fighter (uncredited)
- The Twilight Zone (1963, TV series, season 5 episode 2: "Steel") - Battling Maxo
- Robin and the 7 Hoods (1964) - Factory Worker (uncredited)
- Kisses for My President (1964) - Senator (uncredited)
- The Great Race (1965) - Saloon Brawler (uncredited)
- The Third Day (1965) - Policeman (uncredited)
- Our Man Flint (1966) - Guard (uncredited)
- The Silencers (1966) - Armed Man (uncredited)
- Johnny Reno (1966) - Bellows
- A Fine Madness (1966) - Customer (uncredited)
- Not with My Wife, You Don't! (1966) - Second Australian (uncredited)
- Point Blank (1967) - Guard (uncredited)
- Fort Utah (1967) - Henchman (uncredited)
- Cool Hand Luke (1967) - Chief (uncredited)
- Where Were You When the Lights Went Out? (1968) - Passenger (uncredited)
- The Boston Strangler (1968) - Cop (uncredited)
- The Split (1968) - Physical Instructor (uncredited)
- Rogue's Gallery (1968) - Assailant
- Hogan's Heroes (1970, TV series, season 5, episode 18: "The Softer They Fall") - "Battling" Bruno Krieger
- The Molly Maguires (1970) - Policeman (uncredited)
- Something Big (1971) - Corporal James
- Dirty Harry (1971) - Flower Vendor (uncredited)
- The Hound of the Baskervilles (1972, TV movie) - Seldon (uncredited)
- Melinda (1972) - Cop (uncredited)
- Slaughter's Big Rip-Off (1973) - Lyle Parker
- Hard Times (1975) - Speed's Hitter
- The Enforcer (1976) - Huey
- Movie Movie (1978) - Hood #3 (segment "Dynamite Hands")
- Every Which Way but Loose (1978) - Trucker #1
- Hide in Plain Sight (1980) - Frankie Irish
- Beyond Evil (1980) - Hospital Attendant
- Bronco Billy (1980) - Cowboy at Bar
- Cheaper to Keep Her (1980) - Abe
- In God We Tru$t (1980) - Paddywagon Driver
- Raging Bull (1980) - Cornerman (uncredited)
- Any Which Way You Can (1980) - Fight Spectator (uncredited)
- ...All the Marbles (1981) - Thug #1
- The Beastmaster (1982) - Boatman (uncredited)
- Little House on the Prairie (1982, TV series) - Big Arnie
- Johnny Dangerously (1984) - Governor
- Native Son (1986) - White Man #4
- Programmed to Kill (1987) - Cig. Guard
- Everybody's All-American (1988) - Bigot
- Indio (1989) - Willis - Softball Team Member (uncredited)
- The Assassin (1990) - Ed O'Neil
- Dick Tracy (1990) - The Brow
- Sweet Justice (1993) - Rivas Goon
- The Enemy Within (1994, TV movie) - Bowman
- Farewell, My Love (2000) - Bouncer #3
- Route 666 (2001) - Prison Guard #1
- Going Forth by Day (2002) - Performer (segment: "The Deluge")
- The Ring (2002) - Ferry Worker
- Hood of Horror (2006) - Tex, Sr.
- Legion (2010) - Elderly Man (final film role)
