= Scott Brady (actor) =

American actor (1924–1985)

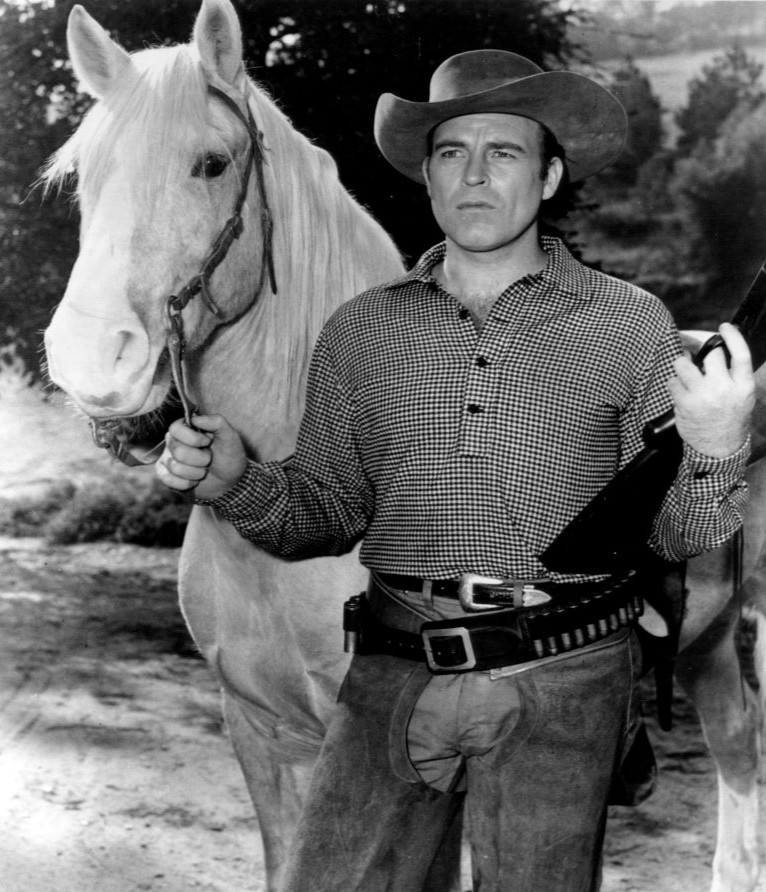
- Brady in Shotgun Slade, 1960
- Born: Gerard Kenneth Tierney; September 13, 1924; Brooklyn, New York, U.S.
- Died: April 16, 1985 (aged 60); Los Angeles, California, U.S.
- Resting place: Holy Cross Cemetery, Culver City
- Occupation: Actor
- Years active: 1948–1985
- Spouse: Mary Lizabeth Tirony (1967–1985) (his death)
- Children: 2
- Relatives: Lawrence Tierney (brother)

Scott Brady (born Gerard Kenneth Tierney; September 13, 1924 – April 16, 1985) was an American film and television actor best known for his roles in Western films and as a ubiquitous television presence. He played the title role in the television series Shotgun Slade (1959–1961).

== Early life ==
Gerard Kenneth Tierney was born in Brooklyn to Lawrence and Mary Alice (née Crowley) Tierney; his father was an Irish-American policeman who was chief of the New York City Aqueduct Police force. His older and younger brothers were fellow actors Lawrence and Edward Tierney, respectively. He took his screen name from a friend's short story in which the hero, a boxer, was named Scott Brady.

Brady was reared in suburban Westchester County, New York. He was nicknamed "Roddy" in his youth. He attended Roosevelt and St. Michael's High Schools, where he lettered in basketball, football, and track. He aspired to become a football coach or a radio announcer, but instead enlisted in the United States Navy before his graduation from high school. During World War II, he served as a naval aviation mechanic overseas on the USS Norton Sound.

Discharged in 1946, Brady headed to Los Angeles, where his older brother Lawrence was already making some progress as an actor. First working as a cab driver and a lumberjack, Brady studied at the Beverly Hills Drama School.

Brady had two brushes with scandal. In 1957, he was arrested for narcotics possession, but the charge was dropped, and he always maintained that he was framed. In 1963, he was barred by the New York State Harness Racing Commission from participation in the sport due to his association with known bookmakers. He also was involved in two lawsuits with Eagle-Lion Films in 1950. The studio sued Brady for $105,000, charging that he had failed to fulfill his contract's requirement of making two films a year for five years. Brady countersued for $510,000 in damages, saying that his career had been damaged when Eagle-Lion suspended him.

== Career ==
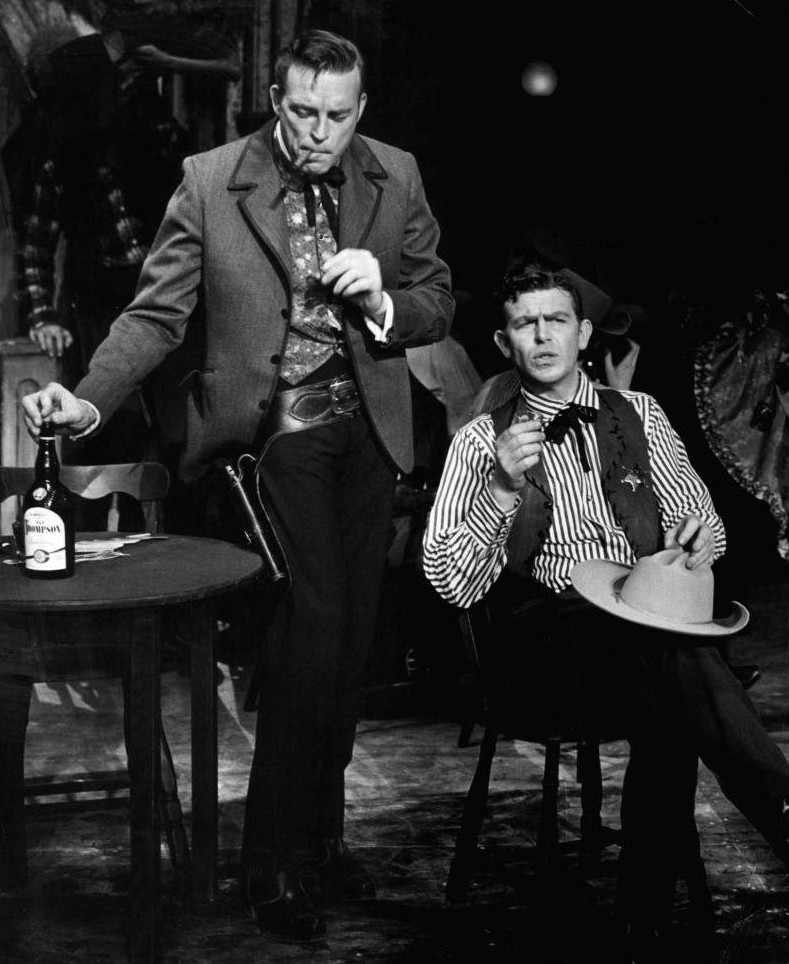
Scott Brady and Andy Griffith in Broadway musical version of Destry Rides Again (1959)

In 1948, Brady made his film debut as a boxer in the programmer In This Corner (1948) and took tough-guy roles in films like He Walked by Night, Undertow, and Canon City. He was the leading man in the romantic comedy The Model and the Marriage Broker and in the cult Western drama Johnny Guitar.

From 1953 to 1956, Brady appeared four times in different roles on Lux Video Theatre and appeared five times on The Ford Television Theatre. In 1955, he portrayed Ted Slater in "Man in the Ring" of The Loretta Young Show. In 1955 and 1957, Brady appeared twice on Studio 57. Early in 1957, he was cast in "The Barbed Wire Preacher" of Crossroads.

On December 26, 1957, Brady played the frontier figure William Bent in the episode "Lone Woman" on Playhouse 90.

From 1955 to 1959, Brady appeared five times on Schlitz Playhouse, including the roles of Reno Cromwell in "Night of the Big Swamp" and Calvin Penny in "Papa Said No". The Schlitz Playhouse episode "The Salted Mine" became the pilot for Brady's own Western television series Shotgun Slade, which aired 78 episodes in syndication from 1959 to 1961.

In addition to Shotgun Slade, Brady appeared in several other television Westerns, including Dick Powell's Zane Grey Theatre, The High Chaparral, Lancer, Dirty Sally, The Virginian (twice), and Gunsmoke (three times).

In 1958, he played the lead role of Sergeant Matt Blake in Ambush at Cimarron Pass. He dated a number of actresses in Hollywood during this period, including Kipp Hamilton, Carol Ohmart, Reiko Sato, and Shelley Winters.

In 1961, he played the roles of John Keller in "We're Holding Your Son" on General Electric Theater and Ernie Taggart in "Voyage into Fear" on Checkmate. In 1962, Brady was cast in the lead guest role as reporter/commentator Floyd Gibbons in "The Floyd Gibbons Story" of The Untouchables. The next year, he portrayed Bill Floyd in the episode "Run for Doom" of The Alfred Hitchcock Hour. In 1967, Brady guest-starred on Judd, for the Defense.

During the mid-1960s, Brady starred in several of A.C. Lyles' Western films. In 1969, he portrayed Budd Blake in the episode "Panic" of Bracken's World. That same year, he played John Harris in the episode "Log 102: We Can't Just Walk Away From It" of Adam 12. Brady was cast as a corrupt US sergeant serving overseas in the film, $ (1971). In 1973, he was cast as Davey Collier in "No Stone Unturned" of Banacek. On December 5, 1974, Brady guest-starred in the season-one Movin' On TV episode "High Rollers" as a Vegas pit boss. From 1975 to 1977, Brady had the recurring role of Vinnie in 16 episodes of Police Story.

On February 15, 1977, he appeared as Shirley Feeney's father, Jack Feeney, in the episode "Buddy, Can You Spare a Father?" on ABC's Laverne & Shirley. Though he had turned down the role of Archie Bunker on All in the Family, Brady appeared as Joe Foley on four episodes in 1976. He appeared five times on The Rockford Files. In 1977, he portrayed Lou Caruso in "Caruso's Way" of Welcome Back, Kotter, and appeared as Matt Zaleski in the TV miniseries Wheels the following year.

Brady portrayed Capt. Scofield, in the 1981 made-for-TV film McClain's Law. In 1983, Brady portrayed Alex Kidd in "Shadow of Sam Penny" on Simon and Simon. Brady's last film acting role was as Sheriff Frank Reilly in the 1984 film Gremlins.

== Personal life ==
He was in a relationship with actress and dancer Gwen Verdon.

== Death ==
On April 16, 1985, Brady died of respiratory failure caused by pulmonary fibrosis at the Motion Picture House and Hospital in Woodland Hills, California at the age of 60.

== Partial filmography ==
- The Counterfeiters (1948) – Jerry McGee
- Canon City (1948) – Jim Sherbondy
- In This Corner (1948) – Jimmy Weston
- He Walked by Night (1948) – Police Sergeant Marty Brennan
- The Gal Who Took the West (1949) – Lee O'Hara
- Port of New York (1949) – Michael 'Mickey' Waters
- Undertow (1949) – Tony Reagan
- I Was a Shoplifter (1950) – Jeff Andrews
- Undercover Girl (1950) – Lieutenant Michael Trent
- Kansas Raiders (1950) – Bill Anderson
- The Model and the Marriage Broker (1951) – Matt Hornbeck
- Bronco Buster (1952) – Bart Eaton
- Untamed Frontier (1952) – Glenn Denbow
- Yankee Buccaneer (1952) – Lieutenant David Farragut
- Montana Belle (1952) – Bob Dalton
- Bloodhounds of Broadway (1952) – Robert 'Numbers' Foster
- Three Steps to the Gallows (UK) / White Fire (US) (1953) – Gregor Stevens
- A Perilous Journey (1953) – Shard Benton
- El Alamein (1953) – Joe Banning
- Johnny Guitar (1954) – Dancin' Kid
- The Law vs. Billy the Kid (1954) – William 'Billy the Kid' Bonney
- They Were So Young (1954) – Richard Lanning
- Gentlemen Marry Brunettes (1955) – David Action
- The Vanishing American (1955) – Blandy
- Mohawk (1956) – Jonathan
- Terror at Midnight (1956) – Neal 'Rick' Rickards
- The Maverick Queen (1956) – Sundance
- The Storm Rider (1957) – Bart Jones
- The Restless Breed (1957) – Mitch
- Ambush at Cimarron Pass (1958) – Sergeant Matt Blake
- Blood Arrow (1958) – Dan Kree
- Battle Flame (1959) – 1st Lieutenant Frank Davis
- The Alfred Hitchcock Hour (1963) (Season 1 episode "Run for Doom") – Bill Floyd
- Operation Bikini (1963) – Captain Emmett Carey
- Stage to Thunder Rock (1964) – Sam Swope
- John Goldfarb, Please Come Home! (1965) – Coach Sakalakis
- Black Spurs (1965) – Reverend Tanner
- Destination Inner Space (1966) – Commander Wayne
- Castle of Evil (1966) – Matt Granger
- Red Tomahawk (1967) – Ep Wyatt
- Fort Utah (1967) – Dajin
- Journey to the Center of Time (1967) – Stanton
- Arizona Bushwhackers (1968) – Tom Rile
- The Road Hustlers (1968) – Earl Veasey
- They Ran for Their Lives (1968) – Joe Seely
- The Mighty Gorga (1969) – Dan Morgan
- Nightmare in Wax (1969) – Detective Haskell
- Satan's Sadists (1969) – Charlie Baldwin
- The Ice House (1969) – Lieutenant Scott
- The Cycle Savages (1969) – Vice Squad Detective (uncredited)
- Five Bloody Graves (1969) – Jim Wade
- Marooned (1969) – Public Affairs Officer
- Hell's Bloody Devils (1970) – Brand
- Cain's Cutthroats (1970) – Justice Cain
- Doctors' Wives (1971) – Sergeant Malloy
- $ (UK title: The Heist) (1971) – Sarge
- The Loners (1972) – Policeman Hearn
- Bonnie's Kids (1972) – Ben
- The Leo Chronicles (1972)
- Wicked, Wicked (1973) – Police Sergeant Ramsey
- The Night Strangler (1973) – Police Captain Schubert
- Roll, Freddy, Roll! (1974 TV movie) – Admiral Norton
- When Every Day Was the Fourth of July (1978 TV movie) – Officer Michael Doyle
- Women in White (1979 TV movie) – Bartender
- The China Syndrome (1979) – Herman De Young
- Strange Behavior (1981) – Shea
- McClain's Law (1981) – Captain Scofield
- Gremlins (1984) – Sheriff Frank (final film role)
