= Jimmie Haskell =

American composer and arranger (1926–2016)

- Born: Sheridan Pearlman; November 7, 1926; New York City, New York, U.S.
- Died: February 4, 2016 (aged 89) Laguna Niguel, California, U.S.
- Genres: Pop; rock; film score
- Occupations: Composer, arranger, producer

Jimmie Haskell (born Sheridan Pearlman; November 7, 1926 – February 4, 2016) was an American composer, arranger, and record producer. He collaborated with a variety of artists including Ricky Nelson, Wayne Newton, Elvis Presley, Neil Diamond, Crosby, Stills & Nash, Steely Dan, Billy Joel, Simon & Garfunkel and the Everly Brothers. He also wrote over 100 film and television scores. Over the course of his career, Haskell won three Grammy Awards (for Best Arrangement, Instrumental and Vocals) and a Primetime Emmy Award.

== Life and career ==
Haskell was born in Brooklyn, New York. He entered the music business in the 1950s doing arrangements for Imperial Records. His first professional arrangement was a chart of "Nature Boy", sold to Lionel Hampton. He became the arranger of choice for Ricky Nelson, arranging and producing around 75 records for the artist, including such hits as "There's Nothing I Can Say" and "Hello Mary Lou". In 1960, he accompanied Elvis Presley on accordion on the "G.I. Blues" soundtrack. Almost four decades later, he provided arrangements on Sheryl Crow's album The Globe Sessions.

In 1960, Haskell entered the motion picture soundtrack industry as an uncredited orchestrator for Dimitri Tiomkin's The Alamo. The following year he composed his first score, Love in a Goldfish Bowl. His composition "The Silly Song" became the theme song of American television's The Hollywood Squares. He composed a variety of film scores such as A.C. Lyles' Westerns and arranging "Weird Al" Yankovic's title song for Spy Hard.

In the late 1960s and early 1970s, Haskell was the arranger of choice for The Grass Roots. He arranged the signature string section on Chicago's song "If You Leave Me Now", for which he won a Grammy Award, and also provided horn and string arrangements for Blondie's 1980 album Autoamerican, including for the US and UK No. 1 hit "The Tide Is High". In the mid-1970s, Haskell worked with the band Steely Dan, providing orchestration on their 1974 album Pretzel Logic and arrangements and horn on their 1975 album Katy Lied. In 2009, well into his eighties, he provided "a lovely, understated string arrangement" on David Rawlings' album A Friend of a Friend.

In addition to composing and arranging, Haskell would often act as conductor and selected the musicians used.

== Personal life ==
Haskell's birth year is widely reported as 1936 because he lied about his age, figuring he would get more work if people thought he was younger. A statement from his daughter published by The Musicians Union of Los Angeles gives the correct birthday in 1926.

=== Death ===
Haskell died in Laguna Niguel, California on February 4, 2016.

== Selected filmography ==
- Love in a Goldfish Bowl (1961)
- I'll Take Sweden (1965)
- Town Tamer (1965)
- Apache Uprising (1965)
- Red Tomahawk (1966)
- Johnny Reno (1966)
- Waco (1966)
- Hostile Guns (1967)
- Fort Utah (1967)
- The Wicked Dreams of Paula Schultz (1968)
- Arizona Bushwhackers (1968)
- Rogue's Gallery (1968)
- Buckskin (1968)
- The Thousand Plane Raid (1969)
- Zachariah (1971)
- The Honkers (1972)
- Night of the Lepus (1972)
- Dirty Mary, Crazy Larry (1974)
- When the North Wind Blows (1974)
- Death Game (1977)
- The Ghost of Cypress Swamp (1977)
- Joyride (1977)
- Hughes and Harlow: Angels in Hell (1978)
- A Christmas to Remember (1978)
- Dallas Cowboys Cheerleaders (1979)
- The Jericho Mile (1979)
- Guyana: Crime of the Century (1979)
- Goldie and the Boxer (1979)
- Mirror, Mirror (1979)
- Dallas Cowboys Cheerleaders II (1980)
- The Jayne Mansfield Story (1980)
- Hard Country (1981)
- Jake Spanner, Private Eye (1989)

== Television scores ==
- The Hollywood Squares (1965) (composer)
- Bewitched (1966) (composer)
- The Andy Williams Show (1968) (composer)
- The Doris Day Show (1969) (composer)
- Curiosity Shop (1971)
- Land of the Lost (1974) (composer)
- Cathy (1987) (composer)
- Silent Möbius (1998) (main composer with Suzie Katayama and Kenichi Sudo)

== Awards and nominations ==
Haskell was awarded an Emmy for Outstanding Achievement in Music Composition for a Special (Dramatic Underscore) for See How She Runs (1978) and has received two other nominations. He was awarded Grammy Awards for his arrangements of "Ode to Billie Joe" recorded by Bobbie Gentry, "Bridge Over Troubled Water" recorded by Simon and Garfunkel, and "If You Leave Me Now" recorded by Chicago.
