= Arizona Bushwhackers =

1968 film by Lesley Selander

- Theatrical release poster
- Directed by: Lesley Selander
- Screenplay by: Steve Fisher
- Story by: Steve Fisher; Andrew Craddock
- Produced by: A.C. Lyles
- Starring: Howard Keel; Yvonne De Carlo; John Ireland; Marilyn Maxwell; Scott Brady; Brian Donlevy
- Cinematography: Lester Shorr
- Edited by: John F. Schreyer
- Music by: Jimmie Haskell
- Production company: A.C. Lyles Productions
- Distributed by: Paramount Pictures
- Release date: March 1968
- Running time: 87 minutes
- Country: United States
- Language: English

Arizona Bushwhackers is a 1968 American Western film directed by Lesley Selander and starring Howard Keel, Yvonne De Carlo, John Ireland, Marilyn Maxwell, Scott Brady, and Brian Donlevy. The film follows a Confederate spy who, during the American Civil War, takes a job as the marshal of a small Western town to conceal his true mission. But his plans are complicated when he discovers that a local businessman is secretly selling weapons to a band of rampaging Indians.

== Plot ==
Lee Travis, a gambler and gunslinger from the South, is captured during the Civil War. He's given a chance to redeem himself by bringing law and order to the town of Colton, Arizona, where he's to replace the corrupt Sheriff Grover. Mayor Smith hopes Travis will be able to stand up to saloon owner Rile.

What no one knows is that Travis is actually a Confederate agent, sent to transport weapons and ammunition from a hidden cache to nearby Confederate troops. As part of his cover, he starts cleaning up the town, driving away the drunks and vagrants who hang around Rile's saloon. In a dice game, he wins the saloon, promptly shuts it down, and forces Rile out of town. The saloon girl Molly—whom Travis mistakenly believes to be his contact—reveals that Rile has been selling weapons to the Apaches. Travis realizes Rile must have found the hidden cache. While trying to arrest him, Travis is wounded. He's cared for by Jill Wyler, a hat maker and his real contact from the South.

Deputy Dan Shelby discovers that Travis and Jill are Confederate agents. As he tries to take them to the mayor, Grover returns with news: the war is over. He also warns that Rile and the Apaches are planning an attack. The townspeople fight back fiercely. Rile, his men, and most of the Apaches are killed. Jill and Shelby fall in love. Travis leaves town, leaving the saloon in Molly's hands.

== Cast ==
- Howard Keel as Lee Travis
- Yvonne De Carlo as Jill Wyler
- John Ireland as Deputy Dan Shelby
- Marilyn Maxwell as Molly
- Scott Brady as Tom Rile
- Brian Donlevy as Mayor Joe Smith
- Barton MacLane as Sheriff Grover
- James Craig as Ike Clanton
- Roy Rogers Jr. as Roy
- Regis Parton as Curly (as Red Parton)
- Montie Montana as Stage Driver
- Eric Cody as Bushwhacker – Ed Jones
- James Cagney as Narrator
