= Jane Russell =

American actress, model, and singer (1921–2011)

- Russell in 1945
- Born: Ernestine Jane Geraldine Russell; June 21, 1921; Bemidji, Minnesota, U.S.
- Died: February 28, 2011 (aged 89); Santa Maria, California, U.S.
- Occupations: Actress; model; singer
- Years active: 1943–1986
- Known for: The Outlaw; Gentlemen Prefer Blondes; The Tall Men; The French Line; Foxfire
- Spouses: Bob Waterfield (m. 1943; div. 1968) Roger Barrett (m. 1968; died 1968) John Calvin Peoples (m. 1974; died 1999)
- Children: 3
- Awards: Hollywood Walk of Fame

Ernestine Jane Geraldine Russell (June 21, 1921 – February 28, 2011) was an American actress, model, and singer. She was one of Hollywood's leading sex symbols in the 1940s and 1950s and starred in more than 20 films.

Russell was known for her beauty, silhouette, and a great presence that combined charisma and seriousness. She moved from the Midwest to California, where she had her first film role in Howard Hughes' The Outlaw (1943). In 1947, Russell delved into music before returning to films. After starring in several films in the 1950s, including Gentlemen Prefer Blondes (1953) and The Fuzzy Pink Nightgown (1957), Russell again returned to music while completing several other films in the 1960s.

Russell married three times, adopted three children, and in 1955 founded Waif, the first international adoption program. She received several accolades for her achievements in film. Her hand and footprints were immortalized in the forecourt of Grauman's Chinese Theatre along with Marilyn Monroe's. A star with her name was placed on the Hollywood Walk of Fame.

== Early life ==
Ernestine Jane Geraldine Russell was born on June 21, 1921, in Bemidji, Minnesota. She had four brothers: Thomas, Kenneth, Jamie, and Wallace.

Her father had been a first lieutenant in the U.S. Army, and her mother an actress with a road troupe; her mother was also the subject of a portrait by Mary Bradish Titcomb, Portrait of Geraldine J., which received public attention when purchased by Woodrow Wilson. Russell's parents lived in Edmonton, Alberta, until shortly before her birth and returned there nine days later, where they lived for the first year or two of her life. The family then moved to Southern California where her father worked as an office manager.

Russell's mother arranged for her to take piano lessons. Jane was also interested in drama, and participated in stage productions at Van Nuys High School. Her early ambition was to be a designer of some kind, until the death of her father in his mid-40s, when she decided to work as a receptionist after high school graduation. She also modeled for photographers, and, at the urging of her mother, studied drama and acting with Max Reinhardt's Theatrical Workshop, and actress and acting coach Maria Ouspenskaya.

== Career ==
=== The Outlaw ===
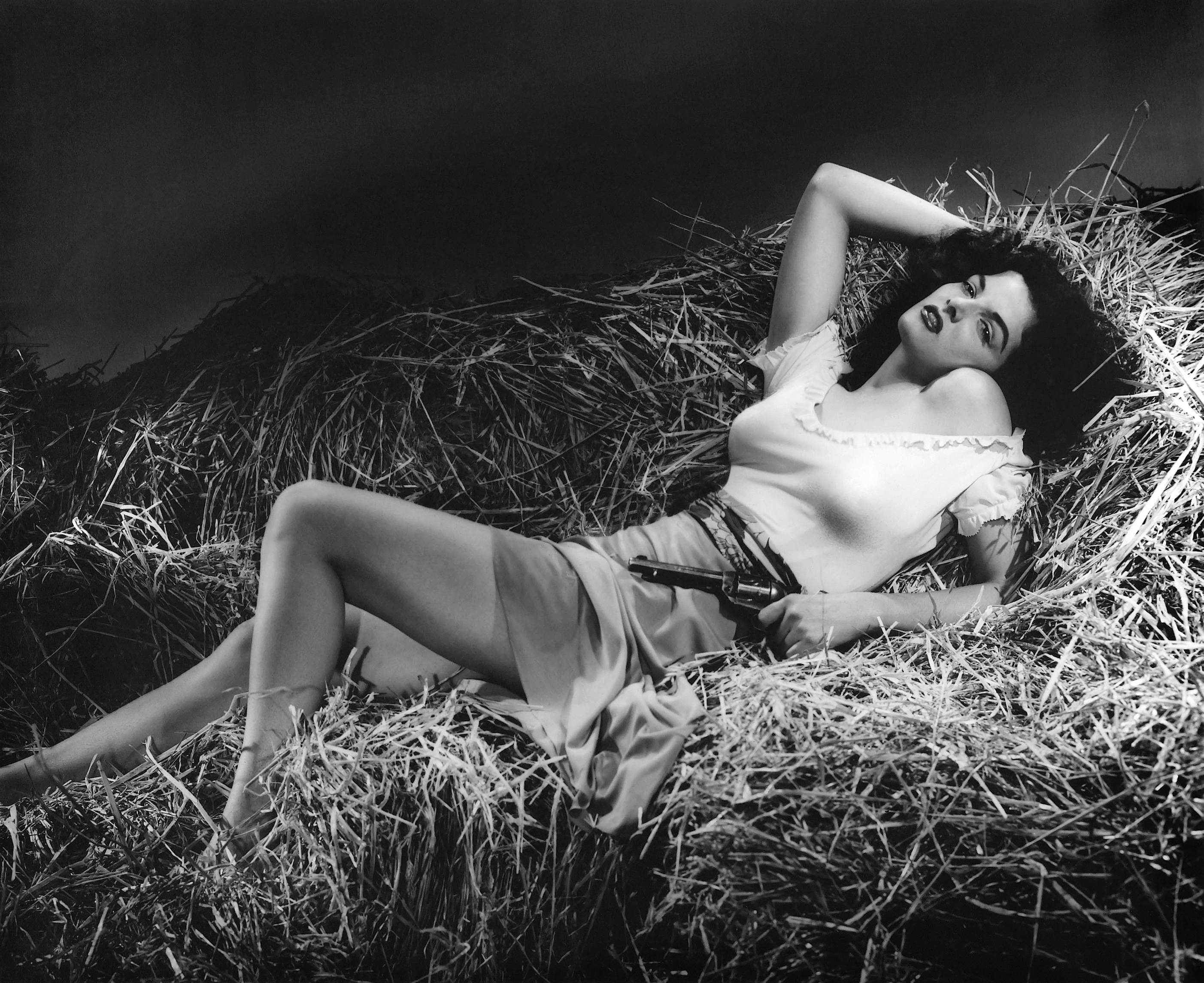
Publicity still of Russell in The Outlaw by George Hurrell

In 1940, Russell was signed to a seven-year contract by film mogul Howard Hughes, and made her motion-picture debut in The Outlaw (1943), a story about Billy the Kid that went to great lengths to showcase her figure.

The movie was completed in 1941, but it was not released until 1943 in a limited release. Problems occurred with the censorship of the production code over the way her cleavage was displayed in promotion of the film.

When the movie was finally approved, it had a general release in 1946. During that time, Russell was kept busy doing publicity and became known nationally. Contrary to countless incorrect reports in the media since the release of The Outlaw, Russell did not wear the specially designed underwire bra that Howard Hughes had designed and made for her to wear during filming. According to Jane's 1985 autobiography, she said that the bra was so uncomfortable that she secretly discarded it and wore her own bra with the cups padded with tissue and the straps pulled up to elevate her breasts.

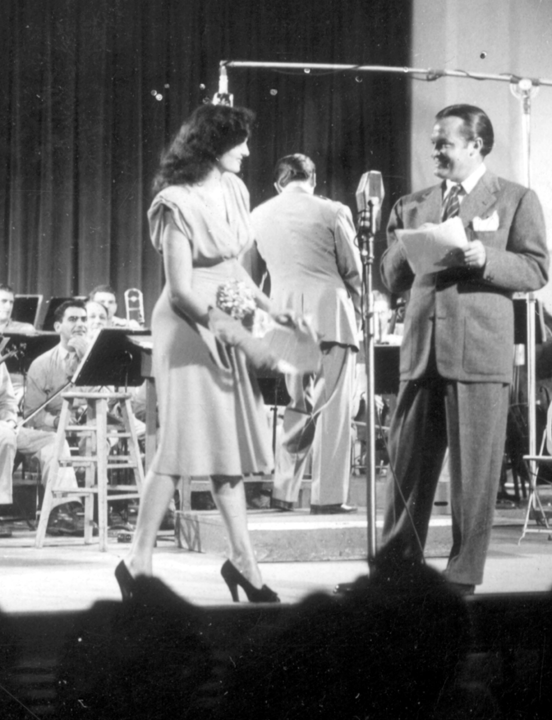
Russell with Bob Hope in 1944

Russell's measurements were 38-24-36, and she stood 5 ft 7 in (97-61-91 cm and 1.7 m), making her more statuesque than most of her contemporaries. Her favorite co-star Bob Hope once introduced her as "the two and only Jane Russell". He joked, "Culture is the ability to describe Jane Russell without moving your hands." Howard Hughes said, "There are two good reasons why men go to see her. Those are enough."

She was a popular pin-up photo with servicemen during World War II. Speaking about her sex appeal, Russell later said, "Sex appeal is good – but not in bad taste. Then it's ugly. I don't think a star has any business posing in a vulgar way. I've seen plenty of pin-up pictures that have sex appeal, interest, and allure, but they're not vulgar. They have a little art to them. Marilyn's calendar was artistic."

She did not appear in another movie until 1946, when she played Joan Kenwood in Young Widow for Hunt Stromberg, who released it through United Artists. The film went over budget by $600,000 and was a box office failure.

=== Early musical ventures ===
In 1947, Russell launched a musical career. She sang with the Kay Kyser Orchestra on radio, and recorded two singles with his band, "As Long As I Live" and "Boin-n-n-ng!" She also cut a 78 rpm album that year for Columbia Records, Let's Put Out the Lights, which included eight torch ballads and cover art that included a diaphanous gown.

In a 2009 interview for the liner notes to another CD, Fine and Dandy, Russell denounced the Columbia album as "horrible and boring to listen to". It was reissued on CD in 2002, in a package that also included the Kyser singles and two songs she recorded for Columbia in 1949 that had gone unreleased at the time. In 1950, she recorded a single, "Kisses and Tears", with Frank Sinatra and The Modernaires for Columbia.

=== The Paleface ===
Russell's career revived when she was cast as Calamity Jane opposite Bob Hope in The Paleface (1948) on loan out to Paramount. The film was a sizeable box office hit, earning $4.5 million and becoming Paramount's most successful release of the year.

Russell shot Montana Belle for Fidelity Pictures in 1948, playing Belle Starr. The film was intended to be released by Republic Pictures, but the producer sold the film to RKO, who released it in 1952.

=== RKO Pictures ===
Howard Hughes bought RKO Pictures, and would be Russell's main employer for the next few years.

At that studio, Russell co-starred with Groucho Marx and Frank Sinatra in a musical comedy, Double Dynamite, shot in 1948 and released in 1951. It was a critical and commercial failure.

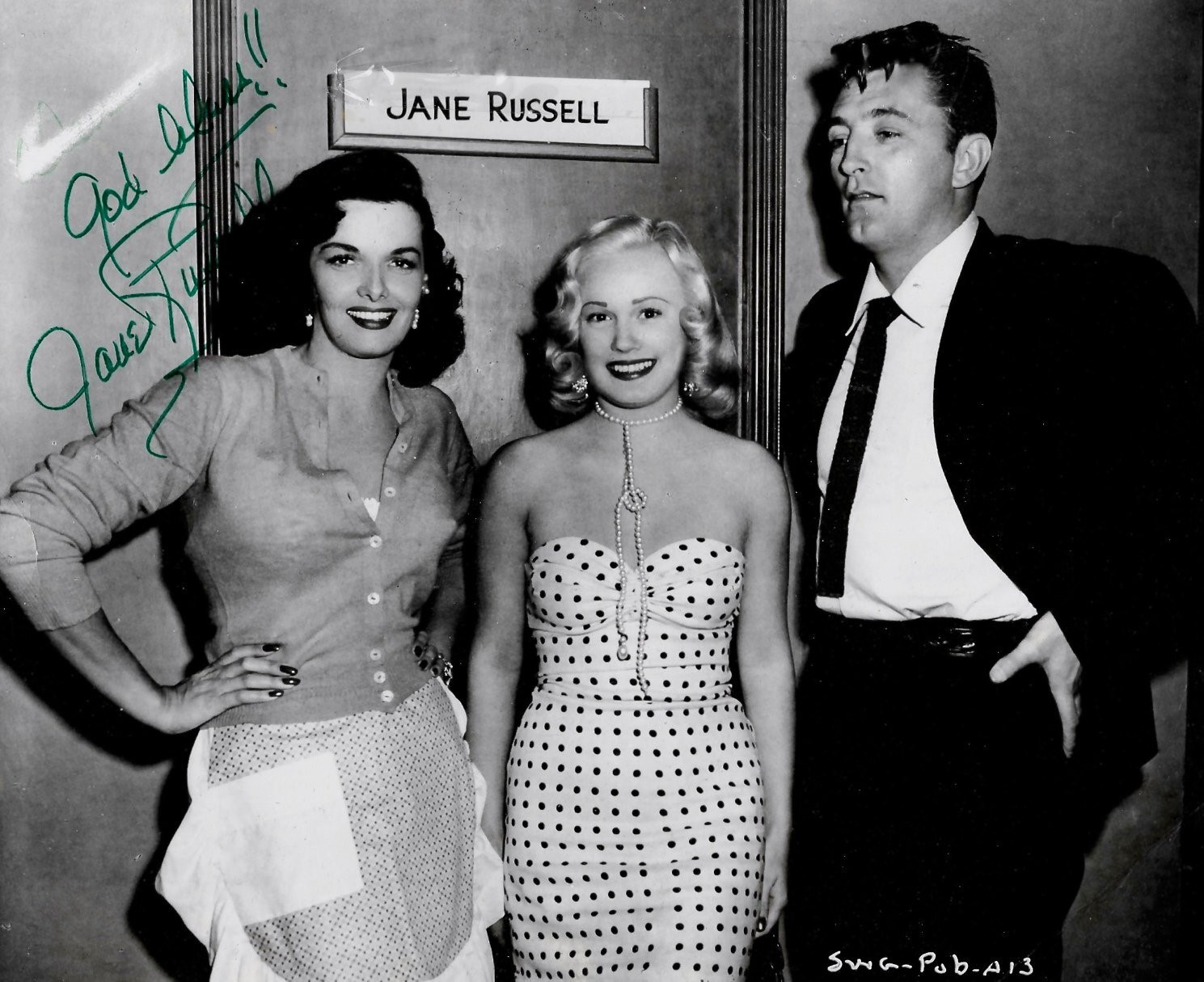
Russell with Mamie Van Doren and Robert Mitchum in 1951

Hughes cast Russell opposite Robert Mitchum and Vincent Price in His Kind of Woman (1951), a film noir originally directed by John Farrow in 1950 which would be reshot by Richard Fleischer the following year. Russell sang two songs in the movie.

Russell did two more film noirs: The Las Vegas Story (1952) with Price and Victor Mature, and Macao (1952) with Mitchum. His Kind of Woman and Macao were minor hits but both involved so much re-shooting because of the interference of Hughes that they lost money.

Paramount borrowed Russell for a reunion with Hope, Son of Paleface (1952), which was another hit. She had a cameo in Road to Bali (1953).

=== Gentlemen Prefer Blondes ===
Russell played Dorothy Shaw in the hit film Gentlemen Prefer Blondes (1953) opposite Marilyn Monroe for 20th Century Fox. The film was a huge success, Russell's biggest hit since The Outlaw, making over $5 million.

Back at RKO, she was in Howard Hughes's production The French Line (1954), a musical. The movie's penultimate moment showed Russell in a form-fitting one-piece bathing suit with strategic cutouts, performing a then-provocative musical number titled "Lookin' for Trouble". In her autobiography, Russell said that the revealing outfit was an alternative to Hughes' original suggestion of a bikini, a very racy choice for a movie costume in 1954. Russell said that she initially wore the bikini in front of her "horrified" movie crew while "feeling very naked". The movie earned $3 million.

Hughes also produced Underwater! (1955), an adventure film with Russell and Richard Egan at RKO. It made $2 million but because of its large cost was a financial flop. Her contract with Hughes ended in February 1954.

=== Russ-Field Productions ===
In 1953, Russell and her first husband, former Los Angeles Rams quarterback Bob Waterfield, formed Russ-Field Productions. In March 1954, they signed a six-picture deal with United Artists to last over three years; Russell only had to appear in three of the films.

Russ-Field loaned out Russell's services for appearing as Amanda Lawrence in Foxfire (1955) at Universal, opposite Jeff Chandler. Russell was paid $200,000 for her role and had the right to draw on Chandler's services for a film later on for her own production company. The film was a moderate success, earning $2 million. That same year, Russell co-starred with Clark Gable in The Tall Men at 20th Century Fox, one of the most popular films of the year, with earnings of $6 million.

Russ-Field produced Gentlemen Marry Brunettes (1955), a sequel to Blondes in which Russell starred alongside Jeanne Crain, for release through United Artists. It was not as successful as the original.

Russ-Field also made some films without Russell for United Artists, such as the 1956 filmThe King and Four Queens, starring Gable and Eleanor Parker (co-produced with Gable's company, GABCO Productions). That same year, they released Run for the Sun, an adaptation of Richard Connell's short story The Most Dangerous Game, starring Richard Widmark and Jane Greer. In 1957, Russell starred in Russ-Field's last production, the romantic comedy The Fuzzy Pink Nightgown, which was a box-office failure.

=== Return to music ===
On the musical front, Russell formed a gospel quartet in 1954, with three other members of a faith-sharing group called the Hollywood Christian Group. The other original members were Connie Haines, Beryl Davis and Della Russell. Hines was a former vocalist in the Harry James and Tommy Dorsey orchestras, while Davis was a British emigrant who had moved to the United States after success entertaining American troops stationed in England during World War II. Della Russell was the wife of crooner Andy Russell. Backed by an orchestra conducted by Lyn Murray, their choral single "Do Lord" reached number 27 on the Billboard singles chart in May 1954, selling two million copies. Della Russell, no relation to Jane, soon left the group, but Jane, Haines and Davis followed up with a trio LP for Capitol Records, The Magic of Believing. Later, another Hollywood bombshell, Rhonda Fleming, joined them for more gospel recordings. The Capitol LP was issued on CD in 2008, in a package that also included the choral singles by the original quartet and two tracks with Fleming replacing Della Russell. A collection of some of Russell's gospel and secular recordings was issued on CD in Britain in 2005, and it includes more secular recordings, including Russell's spoken-word performances of Hollywood Riding Hood and Hollywood Cinderella backed by a jazz group that featured Terry Gibbs and Tony Scott.

In October 1957, she debuted in a successful solo nightclub act at the Sands Hotel in Las Vegas. She also fulfilled later engagements in the United States, Canada, Mexico, South America and Europe. A self-titled solo LP was issued on MGM Records in 1959. It was reissued on CD in 2009 under the title Fine and Dandy, and the CD included some demo and soundtrack recordings, as well. "I finally got to make a record the way I wanted to make it," she said of the MGM album in the liner notes to the CD reissue. In 1959, she debuted with a tour of Janus in New England, performed in Skylark and also starred in Bells Are Ringing at the Westchester Town House in Yonkers, New York.

=== Television ===
Russell moved into television, appearing in episodes of Colgate Theatre, Westinghouse Desilu Playhouse, Death Valley Days (the "Splinter Station", 1960) and The Red Skelton Hour. In 1999, she remarked, "Why did I quit movies? Because I was getting too old! You couldn't go on acting in those years if you were an actress over 30."

Russell was referenced in a 1956 episode of The Honeymooners. Ralph Kramden (played by Jackie Gleason) arrives home "dead" tired, vowing to go straight to bed after dinner, quipping, "You couldn't get me out of this house tonight if you told me that Jane Russell was runnin’ a party upstairs and she couldn't get started until I arrived!" Later, Kramden becomes aware that his best friend and neighbor, Ed Norton, is in fact throwing a party upstairs and did not invite him. After being reminded by his wife, Alice, of his reluctance to attend even a party that Jane Russell was throwing, an insulted Kramden rants, "I was talking about Jane Russell: I said nothing about any party that Norton's running!"

On the sitcom Maude (the episode "The Wallet"), Walter Findlay (played by Bill Macy) carries a lipstick impression and autograph of Jane Russell on a cocktail napkin in his wallet as a good luck charm.

Her last on-screen appearance was in a 1986 episode of Hunter.

=== Later career ===
Russell made her first movie appearance in a number of years in Fate Is the Hunter (1964), in which she was seen as herself performing for the USO in a flashback sequence. She was second-billed in two A.C. Lyles Westerns, Johnny Reno (1966) and Waco (1966), and starred in Cauliflower Cupids, filmed in 1966 but not released until 1970. Russell had a character role in The Born Losers (1967) and Darker Than Amber (1970). After this, she retired from acting in movies, saying she was getting too old.

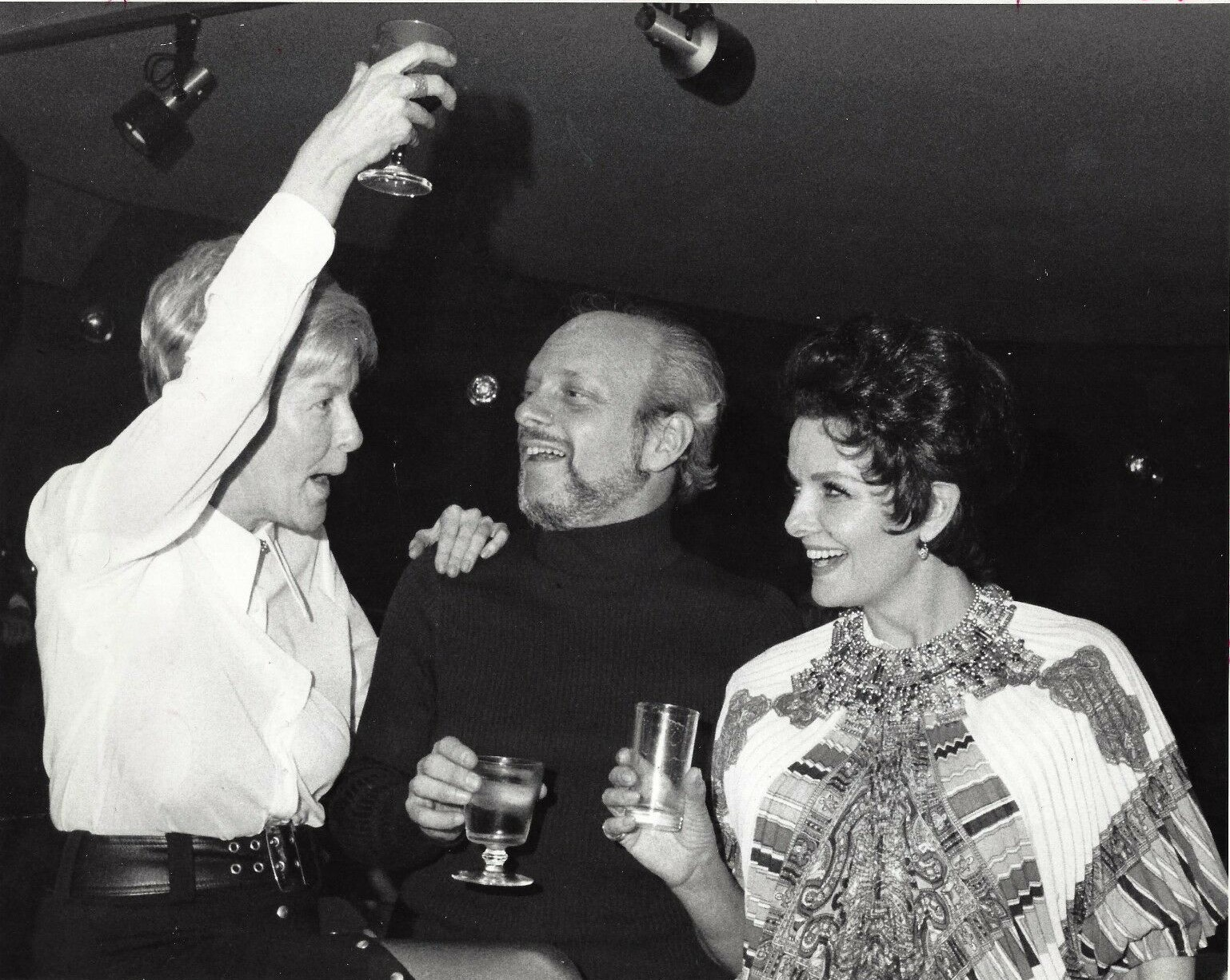
From left to right: Elaine Stritch, Harold Prince, and Russell on the set of Company in 1971

In 1971, Russell starred in the musical drama Company, making her debut on Broadway in the role of Joanne, succeeding Elaine Stritch. Russell performed the role of Joanne for almost six months.

Also in the 1970s, Russell appeared in television commercials as a spokesperson for Playtex's "'Cross-Your-Heart Bras' for us full-figured gals", featuring the "18-Hour Bra".

Russell had a semi-recurring guest role in the soap opera The Yellow Rose (1983) on television and guest-starred on Hunter (1986). She wrote her autobiography, Jane Russell: My Path and My Detours, which was published in 1985.

In 1989, Russell received the Women's International Center Living Legacy Award. Her handprints and footprints are immortalized at Grauman's Chinese Theatre, and she has a star on the Hollywood Walk of Fame at 6850 Hollywood Boulevard. Russell was voted one of the 40 Most Iconic Movie Goddesses of all time in 2009 by Glamour (UK edition).

== Portrayals ==
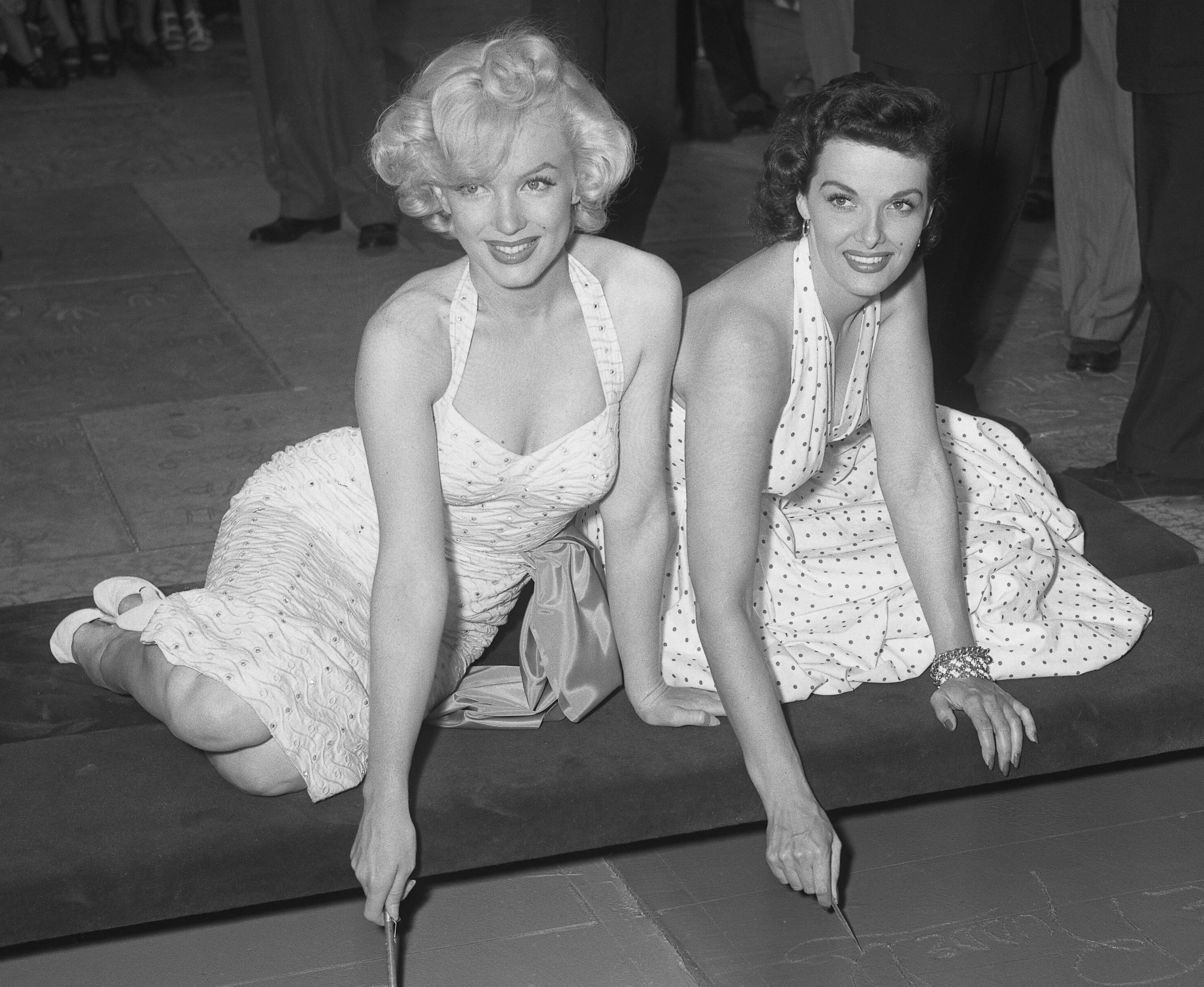
Marilyn Monroe and Russell putting signatures, hand and foot prints in wet concrete at Grauman's Chinese Theatre in Los Angeles, California, 1953

In the 1996 HBO film Norma Jean & Marilyn, Erika Nann portrayed Russell leaving her hand imprints at Grauman's Chinese Theatre alongside Monroe. In 2001, Russell was portrayed by Renee Henderson in the CBS miniseries Blonde, based on the novel of the same name by Joyce Carol Oates.

== Personal life ==
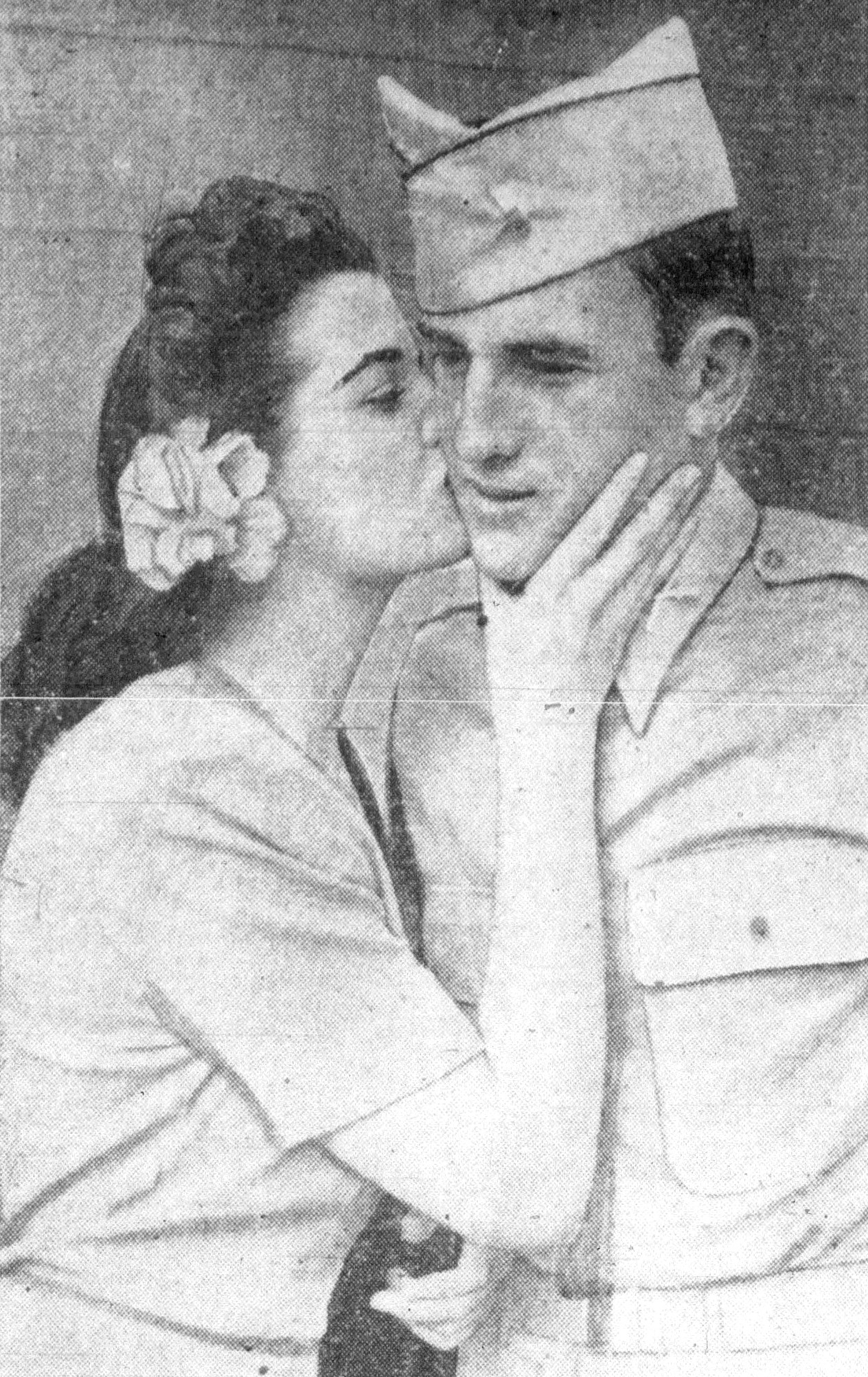
Russell and Waterfield in 1943

After Russell became pregnant with her high-school sweetheart Bob Waterfield's baby, she underwent a botched abortion in 1942 that left her unable to bear children. The abortion went so wrong that Russell had to be hospitalized and nearly died. After this experience, Russell described herself as "vigorously pro-life". She also spoke out against abortion in case of rape or incest.

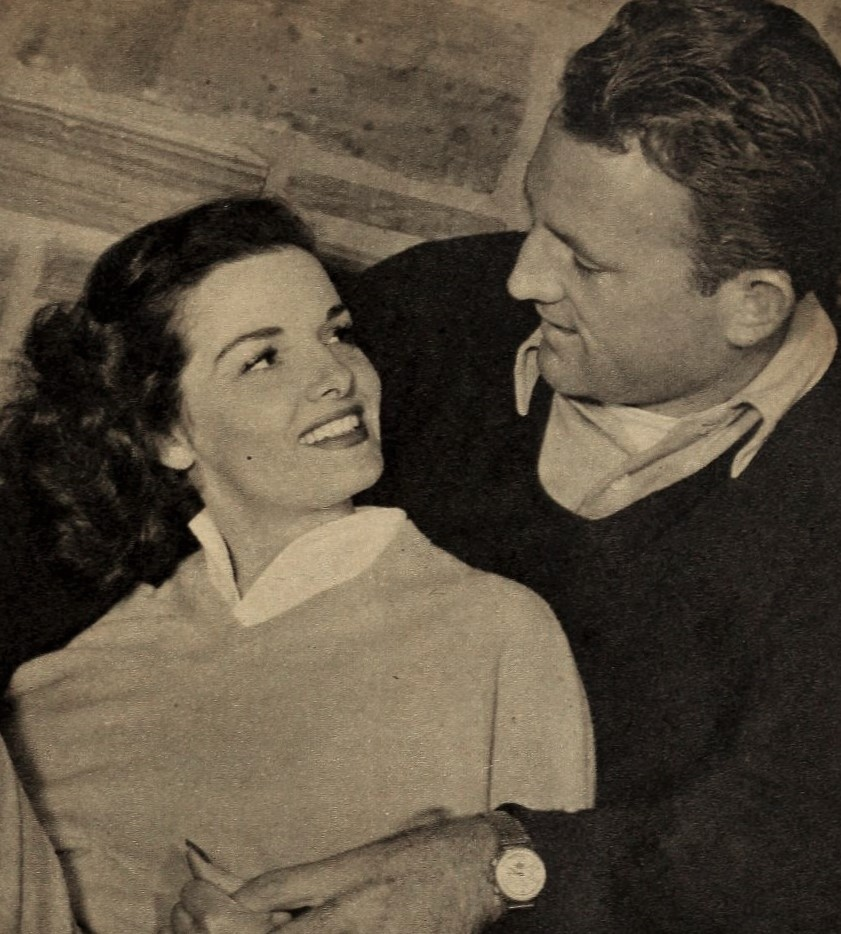
Russell and Waterfield in 1952

Russell married Waterfield in Las Vegas on April 24, 1943. He was a UCLA All-American, quarterback for the Cleveland Rams/Los Angeles Rams, Los Angeles Rams head coach, and member of the Pro Football Hall of Fame. In February 1952, Russell and Waterfield adopted a baby girl, whom they named Tracy. In December 1952, they adopted a fifteen-month-old boy, Thomas, whose birth mother, Hannah McDermott, had moved to London to escape poverty in Northern Ireland, and, in 1956, they adopted a nine-month-old boy, Robert John. In 1955, Russell founded Waif, an organization to place children with adoptive families, and which pioneered adoptions from foreign countries by Americans. In February 1968, Russell filed for divorce from Waterfield, charging him with "cruelty and physical abuse". The divorce was finalized in July 1968, with Russell gaining full custody of her two eldest children and Waterfield gaining full custody of their youngest child. Both were granted visitation rights.

On August 25, 1968, one month after her divorce from Waterfield, Russell married actor Roger Wyatt Barrett, whom she had met at a stock company production. Barrett died of a heart attack only three months later in November 1968, after returning from a long honeymoon in England.

Russell married real-estate broker John Calvin Peoples in 1974. In the late 1970s, Russell and Peoples moved to Sedona, Arizona, where they owned Dude's nightclub, and Russell revived her nightclub act. They spent the majority of their married life residing in Santa Maria, California. Peoples died of heart failure on April 9, 1999.

In the film Philomena (2013), Russell's photograph appears on a wall; a character states that Russell bought a child for £1,000 from the tainted Sean Ross Abbey in Ireland featured in this true-life film; but this claim is countered in at least one recent British report, which states that in the mid-1950s, Russell and her husband "rather informally adopted a son from a woman living in London, but originating in Derry, Northern Ireland. There was a major scandal and a court case, after which Russell was allowed to formalise the adoption."

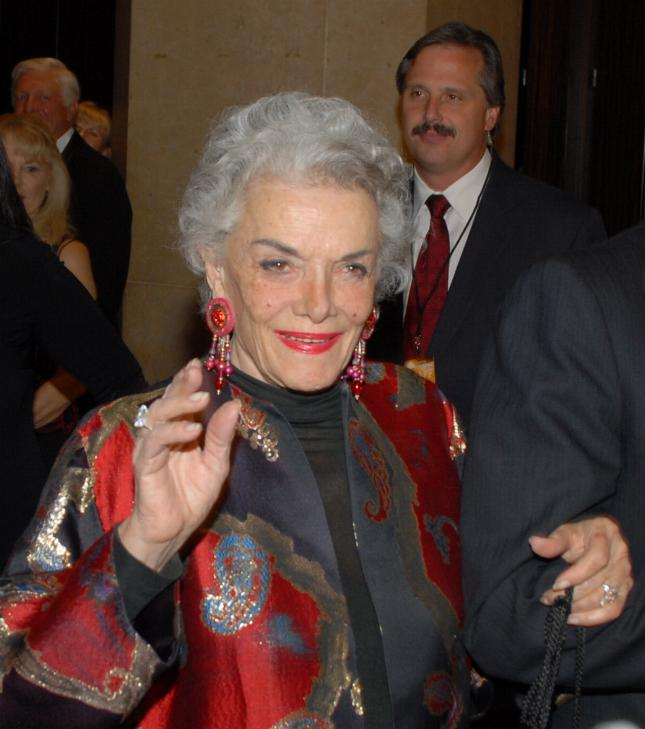
Russell in February 2008

Russell was a devout Christian. At the height of her career, Russell started the "Hollywood Christian Group", a weekly Bible study at her home which was attended by many of the leading names in the film industry. Russell invited Marilyn Monroe to join, but she declined. Monroe once said, "Jane tried to convert me [to Christianity], and I tried to introduce her to Freud." In an interview, Russell later said "I certainly wasn't trying to convert her to religion because I don't like religion", noting that she didn't consider Christianity "a religion". Russell appeared occasionally on the Praise the Lord television program on the Trinity Broadcasting Network, a Christian television channel based in Tustin, California.

Russell was a prominent supporter of the Republican Party, and attended Dwight D. Eisenhower's inauguration, along with such other notables from Hollywood as Lou Costello, Dick Powell, June Allyson, Hugh O'Brian, Anita Louise and Louella Parsons. She was a recovering alcoholic who went into rehab at age 79, and described herself in a 2003 interview, saying, "These days, I am a teetotal, mean-spirited, right-wing, narrow-minded, conservative Christian bigot, but not a racist."

== Death ==
Russell resided in the Santa Maria Valley along the Central Coast of California. She died at her home in Santa Maria of a respiratory-related illness on February 28, 2011. Her funeral was held on March 12, 2011, at Pacific Christian Church, Santa Maria. Russell was survived by her three children, eight grandchildren, and 10 great-grandchildren.

== Filmography ==
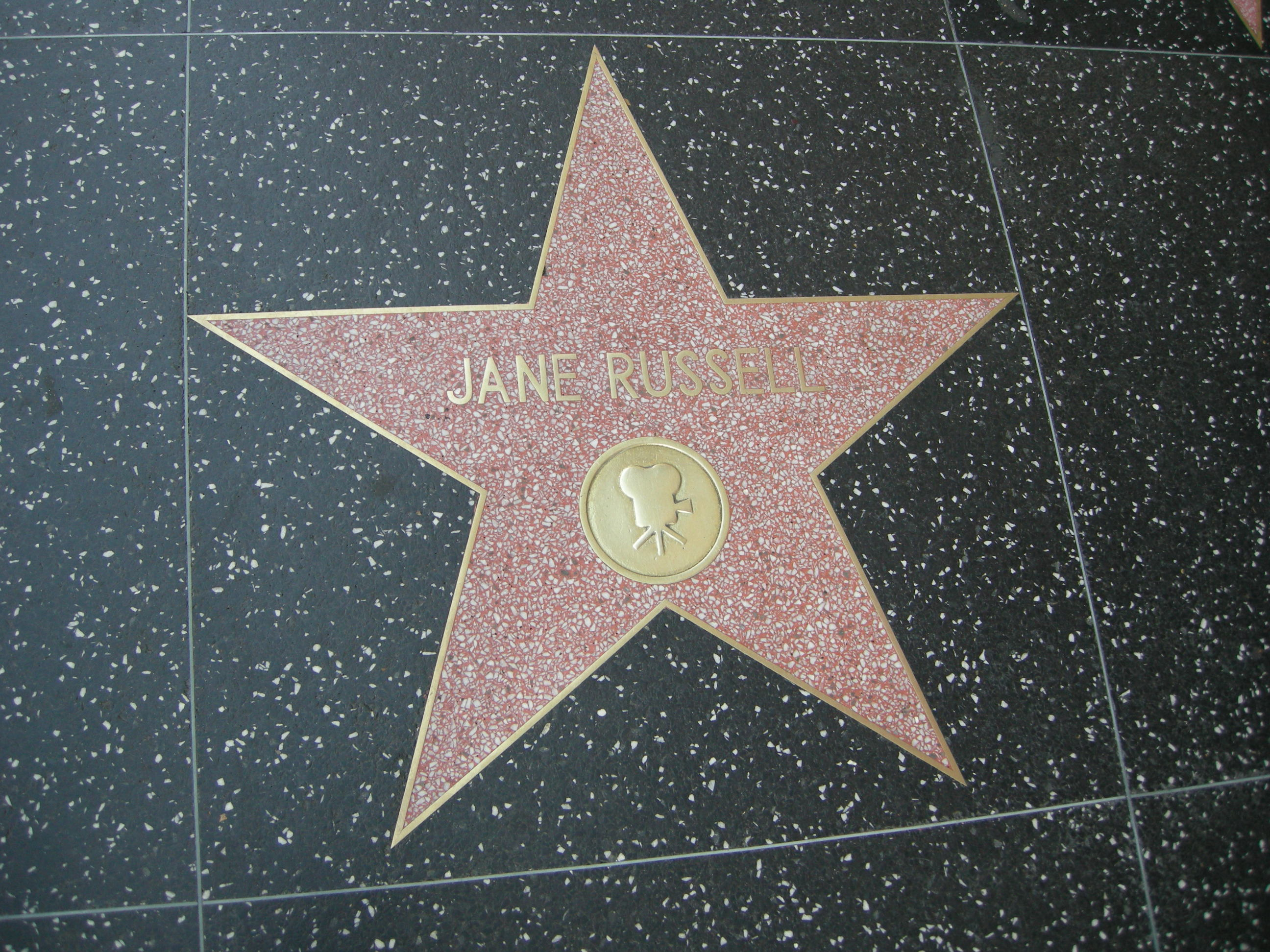
Russell's star on the Hollywood Walk of Fame

- The Outlaw (1943)
- Young Widow (1946)
- The Paleface (1948)
- His Kind of Woman (1951)
- Double Dynamite (1951)
- The Las Vegas Story (1952)
- Macao (1952)
- Son of Paleface (1952)
- Montana Belle (1952)
- Road to Bali (1952; cameo)
- Gentlemen Prefer Blondes (1953)
- The French Line (1953)
- Underwater! (1955)
- Foxfire (1955)
- The Tall Men (1955)
- Gentlemen Marry Brunettes (1955)
- Hot Blood (1956)
- The Revolt of Mamie Stover (1956)
- The Fuzzy Pink Nightgown (1957)
- Fate Is the Hunter (1964; cameo)
- Johnny Reno (1966)
- Waco (1966)
- The Born Losers (1967)
- Darker than Amber (1970)
- Cauliflower Cupids (1970)

== Radio appearances ==
Year	Program	Episode/source
1950	Screen Directors Playhouse	The Paleface
1952	Stars in the Air	The Paleface

== Awards and nominations ==
Year	Organization	Award	Ref.
1955	Golden Apple Award	Most Cooperative Actress	
1984	Golden Boot Awards	Golden Boot	
1989	Women's International Center	Living Legacy Award	
1991	Berlin International Film Festival Awards	Berlinale Camera	
2001	Marco Island Film Festival	Lifetime Achievement Award	

== General bibliography ==
- Russell, Jane (1985). Jane Russell: My Path and Detours. New York: Random House. ISBN 978-0-517-67208-2.
