= Hostile Guns =

1967 film by R. G. Springsteen

- Directed by: R. G. Springsteen
- Screenplay by: Steve Fisher; Sloan Nibley
- Produced by: A.C. Lyles
- Starring: George Montgomery; Yvonne De Carlo; Tab Hunter; Brian Donlevy
- Cinematography: Lothrop B. Worth
- Edited by: John F. Schreyer
- Music by: Jimmie Haskell
- Distributed by: Paramount Pictures
- Release date: July 1967
- Running time: 91 minutes
- Country: United States
- Language: English

Hostile Guns is a 1967 Western starring George Montgomery, Tab Hunter and Yvonne De Carlo.

== Plot ==
Mike Reno is an orphan taken in by his uncle Joe. After five years of working on his uncle's ranch, apparently without pay, Mike has had enough. He proceeds to call his uncle out and demand his five years of back pay ($647.00). His uncle, unhappy with the way Mike called him out sucker punches him. The two fight with no winner and his uncle agrees to pay him what is owed.

Mike then goes to town and promptly loses all $647 gambling in a saloon. When he is broke, the saloon owner has him thrown out. Once outside he accuses the saloon of cheating and right before he shoots the owner Sheriff Gid McCool knocks him out. Mike is promptly convicted and sentenced to 10 days in jail. In the meantime Sheriff McCool takes delivery of a prisoner transport wagon to take convicted murderer Hank Pleasant to Huntsville prison to be hung.

When McCool arrives to pick Hank up He is informed by Sheriff Travis that he could not find anyone to deputize to assist in the transport of Hank. McCool had heard about Mikes fight with his uncle and having fought Uncle Joe himself years earlier, offers Mike the job in exchange for getting him out of jail and $100 which Mike accepts. As they load Hank into the wagon his brother, Aaron Pleasant, and cousin, Ned Cooper, see Hank being loaded and Aaron swears to break Hank out.

During the trip they are trailed by Aaron and Ned. Just as they are about to shoot the sheriff and Mike a stage arrives with more prisoners for transport and foils the attack. Here R.C. Crawford and Angel Dominguez are transferred to the prison wagon. The Wagon continues on to Stone Junction to pick up the last prisoner. Once in Stone Junction the y find that the last prisoner is a woman, Laura Mannon. As she is brought out a couple of townspeople with differing opinions of her guilt begin fighting. The wagon leaves town with the fight still raging in the street behind them.

During the trip they are ambushed by Hanks relatives but come out on top when McCool wounds Ned and the ambushers retreat. That night McCool and Laura speak to each other where it becomes apparent that they know each other. The following evening Mike asks McCool why he is so cold towards Laura and he just says she reminds him of someone he once knew. A little later Laura sits with Mike and they discuss her predicament. She then comes onto Mike and mike offers to break her out. McCool watches the interaction and admits that he and Laura know each other. Mike and McCool then begin fighting each other over whether Laura should go free.

During the fight, just as McCool gets the upper hand, Hank attacks McCool but McCool quickly subdues him. Because of a loss of faith, McCool then shackles Mike in the wagon. He then loads up all of the prisoners and tells Angel that he will speak to the warden about a pardon. Angel turns him down telling McCool that he wants to go to prison so he can learn to cook and get a job in the city when he's released.

On the final day Hanks relatives, reinforced with four of Hank's friends, attack the wagon. Laura, realizing that McCool can't fight them alone, confesses to Mike that she was playing him. She admits that she and McCool love each other and begs Mike to reconsider. Mike does and McCool releases him. The two of them then fight off the ambush and McCool and Laura agree that he will visit her until she has served her sentence.

== Cast ==
- George Montgomery as Sheriff Gid McCool
- Tab Hunter as Mike Reno
- Yvonne De Carlo as Laura Mannon
- Brian Donlevy as Marshal Willett
- John Russell as Aaron Pleasant
- Leo Gordon as Hank Pleasant
- Robert Emhardt as R.C. Crawford
- Pedro Gonzalez Gonzalez as Angel Dominguez
- James Craig as Ned Cooper
- Richard Arlen as Sheriff Travis
- Emile Meyer as Uncle Joe Reno
- Don "Red" Barry as Ed Johnson
- Fuzzy Knight as Buck

== See also ==
- List of American films of 1967
