= Law of the Lawless (1964 film) =

1964 film by William F. Claxton

- Original film poster
- Directed by: William F. Claxton
- Written by: Steve Fisher
- Produced by: A. C. Lyles
- Starring: Dale Robertson; Yvonne De Carlo; William Bendix
- Cinematography: Lester Shorr
- Edited by: Otho Lovering
- Music by: Paul Dunlap
- Color process: Technicolor
- Production company: A.C. Lyles Productions
- Distributed by: Paramount Pictures
- Release dates: March 18, 1964 (Los Angeles); May 13, 1964 (United States)
- Running time: 87 minutes
- Country: United States
- Language: English

Law of the Lawless is a 1964 American Techniscope Western film directed by William F. Claxton, produced by A.C. Lyles, and starring Dale Robertson, Yvonne De Carlo and William Bendix. The supporting cast features Lon Chaney Jr., Kent Taylor, Barton MacLane, John Agar, Richard Arlen, Bruce Cabot and Don "Red" Barry. This was the first of eight westerns Chaney made for A. C. Lyles between 1964 and 1968.

== Plot ==
Big Tom Stone runs a Kansas town in 1889. His son Pete is jailed for the murder of a man named Stapleton, and into town to oversee the trial rides the circuit judge, Clem Rogers.

Rogers has enemies. Among them are the Johnson brothers, who hold a grudge against the judge, and hired gun Joe Rile, employed by Big Tom to make sure Rogers doesn't convict his son.

A saloon girl, Ellie Irish, is introduced to the judge in an attempt by the Stones to sully Rogers' reputation with others in the town. It backfires when Ellie testifies that she saw Pete in a compromising position with Dee, the wife of Stapleton, after which the victim was drawn into a gunfight. Pete is convicted and Big Tom's men disobey his orders to gun down the judge in cold blood.

== Cast ==
- Dale Robertson as Judge Clem Rogers
- Yvonne De Carlo as Ellie Irish
- William Bendix as Sheriff Ed Tanner - Stands out in a dramatic role.
- Bruce Cabot as Joe Rile
- Barton MacLane as Big Tom Stone
- John Agar as Pete Stone
- Richard Arlen as Bartender
- Jody McCrea as George Stapleton
- Kent Taylor as Rand McDonald
- Bill Williams as Silas Miller
- Rod Lauren as Deputy Tim Ludlow
- George Chandler as Martin
- Lon Chaney Jr. as Tiny (as Lon Chaney)
- Don "Red" Barry as Red (as Donald Barry)
- Laurel Goodwin as Mrs. Dee Stapleton
- Romo Vincent as Doc Samuels
- Lorraine Bendix as Molly the Waitress
- Roy Jenson as Roy Johnson
- Jerry Summers as Jake Johnson
- Joseph Forte as Banker (as Joe Forte)
- Alex Sharp as Rider
- Leigh Chapman as Saloon Girl Leigh
- Regis Parton as Ned Johnson (as Reg Parton)
- Dick Ryan as Kinfolk

== Production ==
Following the departure of the producers of Paramount Pictures B picture unit Pine-Thomas Productions, their publicity director A. C. Lyles, who had been employed by Paramount since the age of 14 was employed by the studio to produce second feature films. During this time Paramount arranged to loan Lyles to CBS where he was involved with the production of the Rawhide series in order to learn about Westerns.

A 1963 Paramount production meeting noticed there were no Westerns set to be made by the studio despite the incredible popularity of American westerns in overseas markets. Lyles offered to make a low budget Western in a rapid amount of time, buying a script from his friend screenwriter Steve Fisher.

The film was initially set to star Rory Calhoun, but Calhoun came down with pneumonia the night before the production was set to start filming. Dale Robertson, star of the television series, Tales of Wells Fargo, stepped in at six hours' notice. Lyles had acquired the friendship and respect of a galaxy of experienced actors who offered their services to his production.

== Release and Reception ==
The film was first issued in Italy in late 1963. Its initial American release was as a double feature with Robinson Crusoe on Mars. When the film did well at the box office, Paramount asked him how many more Westerns he could do a year. Lyles replied "five" and he was given the go ahead to produce more second features for the studio.
