= New Mystery Adventures =

American pulp magazine

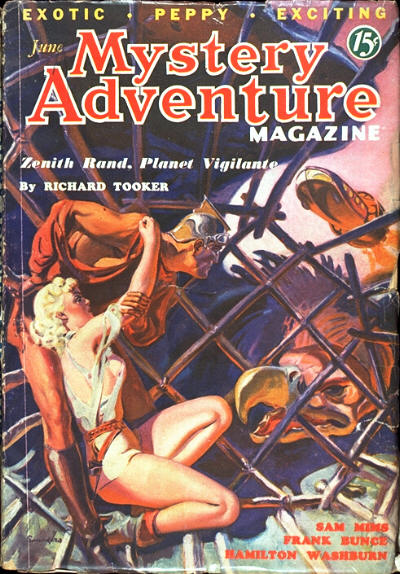
Cover of the June 1936 issue. The artist is Norman Saunders.

New Mystery Adventures was a pulp magazine that appeared from 1935 to 1937. It included a mix of genres: there were occasional science fiction stories, and fantasies such as "Buried Alive" by Wayne Rogers and "Rescued by Satan" by Richard B. Sale, as well as adventure stories by authors such as L. Ron Hubbard. There were also mystery stories and weird menace stories. One story in Lars Anderson's "Domino Lady" series appeared, and other mystery writers included Octavus Roy Cohen and Steve Fisher.

The magazine was originally published by Pierre Publications, but it was acquired by Harold Hersey in December 1936. Hersey claimed a circulation of 600,000 for it, but it ceased publication only six months later.

== Bibliographic details ==
New Mystery Adventures was initially published by Pierre Publications; this changed to Fiction Magazines Inc. from the May 1936 issue. With the December 1936 issue the magazine was acquired by Harold Hersey, and the publishing address changed from 120 West 42nd St to 49 West 45th St, New York, although the publisher name did not change. The title changed several times: it began as New Mystery Adventures, and switched to Mystery Adventure Magazine with the May 1936 issue, then became Mystery Adventures in December 1936, before switching back to Mystery Adventures Magazine from January 1937 to the end of its run. The magazine was monthly throughout its run, except that the May and June 1935 issues were combined, and there was no April 1937 issue. The initial editor was A.R. Roberts; this changed to W.W. Hubbard with the May 1936 issue, and then Harold Hersey in December 1936. There were five volumes, with six, five, six, four, and four issues respectively; the December 1935 issue was mislabelled 1/3 instead of 2/3. It was in pulp format throughout, and had between 128 and 132 pages per issue. The first issue was 20 cents; the remaining issues were all 15 cents.

== Sources ==
- Ashley, Mike (1985). "Mystery Adventures". In Tymn, Marshall B.; Ashley, Mike (eds.). Science Fiction, Fantasy and Weird Fiction Magazines. Westport, Connecticut: Greenwood Press. pp. 416–417. ISBN 0-3132-1221-X.
- Cook, Michael L. (1983). "New Mystery Adventure". In Cook, Michael L. (ed.). Mystery, Detective, and Espionage Magazines. Westport, Connecticut: Greenwood Press. pp. 374–375. ISBN 0-313-23310-1.
