= Buckskin (film) =

1968 film by Michael D. Moore

- Theatrical release poster
- Directed by: Michael D. Moore
- Written by: Michael Fisher
- Produced by: A.C. Lyles
- Starring: Barry Sullivan; Joan Caulfield; Lon Chaney Jr. Aki Aleong; Barton MacLane; Leo Gordon
- Cinematography: W. Wallace Kelley
- Edited by: Jack Wheeler
- Music by: Jimmie Haskell
- Production company: A.C. Lyles Productions
- Distributed by: Paramount Pictures
- Release date: May 1968 (U.S.)
- Running time: 97 minutes
- Country: United States
- Language: English

Buckskin (also known as The Frontiersman) is a 1968 American Western film directed by Michael D. Moore and starring an all-star cast. The main stars were Barry Sullivan and Joan Caulfield. Lon Chaney Jr. plays the role of Sheriff Tangley and Richard Arlen plays a townsman. The other stars were Barbara Hale, John Russell, Wendell Corey, Bill Williams, Leo Gordon, George Chandler, Aki Aleong and Barton MacLane. It was the last of the series of A.C. Lyles Westerns for Paramount. The screenwriter Michael Fisher was the son of the series screenwriter Stephen Gould Fisher. It was released by Paramount Pictures in May 1968.

Betty Hutton was originally selected to play the role of Nora Johnson, but she was fired.

The film also has a small racial twist, common in films of the late 1960s. Sung Lee (played by Aleong) is a Chinese worker who is a victim of prejudice, Chaddock (Sullivan) fights for him during the film.

== Cast ==
- Barry Sullivan as Chaddock
- Joan Caulfield as Nora Johnson
- Wendell Corey as Rep Marlowe
- Lon Chaney Jr. as Sheriff Tangley
- John Russell as Patch
- Barbara Hale as Sarah Cody
- Barton MacLane as Doc Raymond
- Bill Williams as Frank Cody
- Richard Arlen as Townsman
- Leo Gordon as Travis
- Jean-Michel Michenaud as Akii
- George Chandler as Storekeepper Perkins
- Aki Aleong as Sung Li
- Michael Larrain as Jimmy Cody
- Craig Littler as Browdie
- James X. Mitchell as Baker
- Emile Meyer as Corbin
- Robert Riordan as Telegrapher
- Le Roy Johnson as Bartender
- Manuela Thiess as Moni
