= The Fuzzy Pink Nightgown =

1957 film by Norman Taurog

- Film poster
- Directed by: Norman Taurog
- Screenplay by: Richard Alan Simmons
- Based on: The Fuzzy Pink Nightgown; 1956 novel by Sylvia Tate
- Produced by: Robert Waterfield
- Starring: Jane Russell
- Cinematography: Joseph LaShelle
- Edited by: Archie Marshek
- Music by: Billy May
- Distributed by: United Artists
- Release dates: August 21, 1957 (Los Angeles); November 1, 1957 (United States)
- Running time: 87 minutes
- Country: United States
- Language: English

The Fuzzy Pink Nightgown is a 1957 American romantic comedy film made by Russ-Field Productions and released by United Artists. It was directed by Norman Taurog from a screenplay by Richard Alan Simmons, based on a 1956 novel of the same name by Sylvia Tate with jazz music composed and conducted by Billy May.

The film stars Jane Russell, Keenan Wynn and Ralph Meeker.

== Plot ==
Movie star Laurel Stevens has made a new film called The Kidnapped Bride. This gives a brainstorm to a couple of small-time crooks, Mike and Dandy, to kidnap Laurel by pretending to chauffeur the studio limousine to take her to that night’s movie premiere. At first Laurel believes it’s a bad publicity stunt planned by the studio. She scolds them for a stale idea that can backfire as blatant audience manipulation, causing the picture to flop and damaging her career. Laurel does not take them seriously until she tries to get out of the car and Mike slaps her to drive home the point.

While they take her to a Malibu beachfront hideout, agent Barney Baylies and studio chief Martin can't figure out why Laurel's a no-show at the premiere. Gossip columnist Daisy Parker wants to know too, so the executives decide to avoid a scandal at all costs and not report Laurel missing to the police.

Laurel is given a tacky fuzzy pink nightgown to change out of her evening dress. When Laurel reaches into Mike’s pocket at an unguarded moment, she finds that he is not carrying a gun but has been using a pipe to simulate one. Dandy offers to take the first watch over Laurel; Mike warns him that she is crafty and “off-limits” and takes the first watch himself. Meanwhile Laurel attempts to climb out the bathroom window, but Mike warns her that it is a 50-ft drop down to the rocks below. Laurel’s attempt to seduce Mike into letting her go also fails. During Dandy’s watch, Laurel cries to gain his sympathy, claiming that she is afraid of Mike. Dandy informs her that Mike has done time for killing someone, and Mike's appearance interrupts him. When Laurel asks why he is so hostile, Mike replies that he doesn’t like “phonies.” Mike is puzzled why there is no news of the kidnapping.

Mike and Dandy want a $50,000 ransom. Laurel is insulted, feeling she's worth ten times that. Then she regains the perspective that this could ruin her career. Mike now realizes why there is no news of her kidnapping in the media.

Los Angeles police sergeant McBride, who sent Mike to prison for the killing he now believes Mike didn’t commit, comes to Malibu to do a routine parole check on him. He warns Mike not to try to “get even” for the false conviction. To avoid police involvement and publicity, Laurel takes off her platinum blonde wig and alters her appearance, pretending to be Mike's girl and baffling her kidnappers.

The studio finally contacts the police and offers a $100,000 reward. A skeptical McBride warns Baylies of possible charges for faking a kidnapping. News of the kidnapping is received by the news media—and by everyone contacted with ransom demands—with widespread mockery, worrying Laurel. Laurel has fallen for Mike, who now believes the kidnapping must be convincing to save her career. Attempting to call the whole thing off, Laurel tries to convince Dandy that by not accepting the ransom money there is no crime.

When arranging for the ransom payment, McBride notices a portrait of Laurel at the studio and suddenly realizes where he's just seen her.

To try to prevent Mike from going through with the ransom pickup Laurel knocks him out cold. As Mike revives, McBride shows up and warns Mike that he is giving Mike just this one break to compensate for Mike's false conviction. Laurel knocks McBride out cold, and she and Mike steal the police car and race to the airport.

Laurel's assistant, Bertha, takes the ransom money in a suitcase to the airport, where Dandy works at the luggage check-in. Laurel, Mike, and Dandy get apprehended by the cops, but Dandy tells Mike that he purposefully switched the suitcase, deciding not to go through with the scheme.

There is no crime so there are no arrests, particularly since Laurel and Mike are now in love, and she will not press charges. Claiming that she set up the whole stunt, Laurel is willing to sacrifice her career for Mike if necessary. Mike tells her to tell the truth, and she says no one will believe it.

== Cast ==
- Jane Russell as Laurel Stevens
- Keenan Wynn as Dandy
- Ralph Meeker as Mike Peterson
- Fred Clark as Sergeant McBride
- Una Merkel as Bertha
- Adolphe Menjou as Arthur Martin
- Robert H. Harris as Barney Baylies
- Benay Venuta as Daisy Parker
- Bob Kelley as TV Announcer
- Dick Haynes as D.J.
- John Truax as Flack
- Milton Frome as Lieutenant Dempsey

== Production ==
In 1954, Jane Russell formed a production company with her husband Bob Waterfield named Russ-Field. They signed with United Artist for a six-picture deal and for tax purposes, Jane could only appear in half of them. Their first production in association with Voyager Productions was Gentlemen Marry Brunettes—a film Jane Russell did not want to make, but United Artist insisted that she star in the production as part of the Russ-Field deal. Gentlemen Marry Brunettes fared poorly at the box office. Their next two productions, Run for the Sun (1956) and The King and Four Queens (1957), both made money. For Jane's next film, she chose The Fuzzy Pink Nightgown.

Director Norman Taurog wanted Dean Martin in the role of Mike but the role went to Ray Danton. However, Danton suddenly was let go from the picture. As reported by columnist Harrison Carroll" "...troubles have come up on the picture, Ray Danton playing opposite Jane, came down with a severe attack of laryngitis. He has worked only two and a half days. The company doesn't want to wait, so they are getting a new actor for the role." In early 1957, Hollywood columnist Erskine Johnson reported: "The 'laryngitis' announced for Ray Danton's bow-out as Jane Russell's leading man in Fuzzy Pink Nightgown turned out to be the fuzziest announcement of the year. The real reason Ray's out of the cast: After looking at the rushes, Producer Waterfield decided he was too young for Jane. Ralph Meeker is now playing the role." Danton was born in 1931, Russell in 1921, and Meeker in 1920.

About the movie, Russell wrote in her autobiography: "Norman [Taurog] saw the picture as strictly a Technicolor camp, while I had the mystery and romance of it in mind, in black and white. It should have been one way or the other, but as it turned out, it was neither. That was one time the star should have had nothing to say, I guess, because Norman would have made a comedy in color with Dean Martin in his first semi-serious role, which he's done fabulously since, and the publicity alone would have pulled it off, or we should have had another director. Norman still got his slapstick ending, but it just seemed old fashioned without color. The picture was neither fish nor fowl, but I still liked it.". Despite her honest assessment of the movie, Jane considered The Fuzzy Pink Nightgown, along with Gentlemen Prefer Blondes (1953) as the two favorite films of her career .

== Reception ==
At the time of its release, The Fuzzy Pink Nightgown received mixed reviews, The Mirror News wrote "...a belabored attempt at comedy which never comes off. The pace is slow. While both Miss Russell and Mr. Wynn gallantly try for laughs, Meeker labors in a heavy-handed tough-guy fashion, completely at odds with the work of the others." Ruth Waterbury of the L.A. Examiner wrote that although "The Fuzzy Pink Nightgown is no classic among comedies...It's just a good natured romp, which treats nothing with reverence and it will do you nicely for a summer's day amusement." Waterbury praised Russell’s performance, "Miss Russell spoofs the glamour type she herself has been. She spoofs Hollywood, press agentry, even love. What's more she makes you thoroughly enjoy it," but called Meeker the biggest weakness of the movie, ".. a fine stage actor though he is...he is too 'straight' in his work, and screen comedy appears not to be his forte." The Hollywood Reporter called it an "amusing farce [but] the farce is not sustained; it is occasionally abandoned altogether for some semi-serious romantic scenes that tend to break and confuse the mood. However, applauded Russell, "[she] is responsible for the greater part of the picture's success, both in comedy and romance."

Director, Norman Taurog agreed with the critics about Jane's performance. During an interview with Photoplay magazine, Taurog exclaimed: "Talent! The girl has a great flair for comedy. She has a fine talent. At first I thought she was aloof, but after a few days, I discovered, my to my amazement, that Jane was shy. When she warms up she’s wonderful. Her depth is wonderful, as an actress and as a woman. Now that I know her as well as I do, I'd love to work with her again. With the right script she could be out of this world. She's got a whole new career ahead of her. When they hung that sex tag on her, she started with two strikes. But she's overcome that and more. Do I sound excited? I am. I'd like to see Jane do the old Eve Arden part in 'Stage Door.' She'd do a beautiful job. Jane is really something special."

== Box Office ==
Fuzzy Pink Nightgown bombed when it was released in the fall of 1957 and its failure marked the end of Russ-Field Productions. The movie didn't post a profit until the early 1960s due to frequent television airings.

== Home media ==
In 2001 Amazon issued a VHS of The Fuzzy Pink Nightgown in the 1.37 format. Subsequently the movie has been available to stream on various apps and Amazon Prime Video offers it as a purchase or rental.

== Soundtrack ==
Imperial records released an LP soundtrack recording of Billy May's jazzy score at the time of the film's release, and it later became a collector's item. In 2012, Kritzerland Records released May's soundtrack on CD along with Alessandro Cicogini's score of A Breath of Scandal.

== See also ==
- List of American films of 1957
