= Wendell Corey =

American actor and politician (1914–1968)

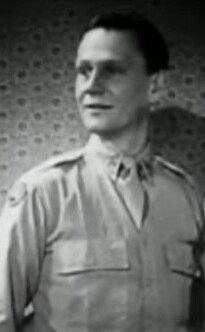
- Corey in the trailer for The Search (1948)

Member of the Santa Monica City Council
- In office 1965–1968

Personal details
- Born: Wendell Reid Corey; March 20, 1914 Dracut, Massachusetts, U.S.
- Died: November 8, 1968 (aged 54) Woodland Hills, California, U.S.
- Resting place: North Becket Cemetery, Becket, Massachusetts
- Party: Republican
- Spouse: Alice Wiley (m. 1939)
- Children: 4
- Occupation: Actor, politician

Wendell Reid Corey (March 20, 1914 – November 8, 1968) was an American actor and politician. He was President of the Academy of Motion Picture Arts and Sciences and a board member of the Screen Actors Guild, and also served on the Santa Monica City Council.

== Biography ==
=== Early years ===
Wendell Reid Corey was born on March 20, 1914, in Dracut, Massachusetts, the son of Milton Rothwell Corey and Julia Etta McKenney. His father was a Congregationalist clergyman and an actor who appeared in Rawhide as Dr Tucker. Wendell was educated in Springfield, Massachusetts. His ancestors included U.S. Presidents John Adams and John Quincy Adams.

=== Stage ===
After graduating from high school in Springfield, Corey sold washing machines and refrigerators at a Springfield department store, when he stopped by to see a friend who was acting at the Springfield Repertory Theater.

The group needed an actor to play the role of a Swedish janitor in Street Scene. Corey took the role and stayed with the theater group for a year, working in the department store during the day and acting at night. Following that, he went into acting full-time with a theater group in Holyoke. He went on to serve a long apprenticeship in the theater, producing, directing and acting in hundreds of plays in summer stock. Corey was also employed by the Federal Theatre Project.

=== Film ===
While appearing as the cynical newspaperman in Elmer Rice's comedy Dream Girl (1945), he was seen by producer Hal Wallis, who persuaded him to sign a contract with Paramount and pursue a motion picture career in Hollywood. Corey's feature film debut came as a gangster in Wallis's Desert Fury (1947) starring Burt Lancaster, John Hodiak, Lizabeth Scott, and Mary Astor. In 1947 he appeared in The Voice of the Turtle on stage with Margaret Sullavan in England.

Wallis promoted him to co-star status in The File on Thelma Jordon (1950) in which he appeared opposite Barbara Stanwyck. Corey had a good part in Columbia's No Sad Songs for Me (1950) playing Margaret Sullavan's husband. He co-starred with Lana Turner in A Life of Her Own but pulled out after only a few days, claiming he was miscast. He was replaced by Ray Milland. Corey had one of his most memorable roles when he played Lt. Thomas Doyle in Alfred Hitchcock's Rear Window (1954) starring James Stewart and Grace Kelly. He toured the US on stage in The Caine Mutiny Court Martial in 1954.

=== Television ===
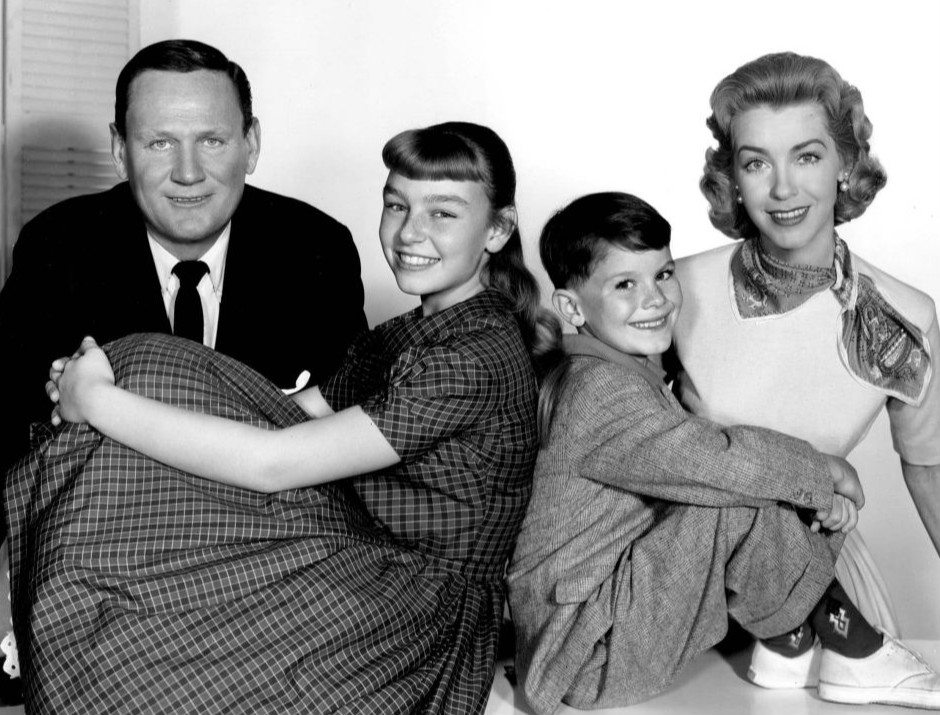
Corey and cast of the 1959 summer replacement TV series Peck's Bad Girl

Corey portrayed Lou Gehrig in "The Lou Gehrig Story" for the television series Climax! (1955). He was a series lead in Harbor Command (1957–1958), starring alongside Casey Walters.

== Other activities ==
Corey was President of the Academy of Motion Picture Arts and Sciences from 1961 to 1963, was a member of the board of directors of the Screen Actors Guild, and a trustee on the board of trustees of the National Academy of Television Arts and Sciences. A Republican campaigner in national politics since 1956, Corey was elected to the Santa Monica City Council in April 1965. Corey supported Barry Goldwater in the 1964 United States presidential election.

== Death ==
Corey died on November 8, 1968, at the age of 54, at the Motion Picture & Television Hospital in Woodland Hills, California. Initial reports stated the cause of death was liver disease; however, the likely cause was cirrhosis of the liver as Corey's alcoholism was well-known. Funeral services were held at First Presbyterian Church in Santa Monica, California.

== Walk of Fame ==
Wendell Corey has a star on the Hollywood Walk of Fame, awarded for his work in TV, at 6328 Hollywood Boulevard in Hollywood, Los Angeles.

== Filmography ==
Year	Title	Role	Notes
1947	Desert Fury	Johnny Ryan	
1947	I Walk Alone	Dave	
1948	The Search	Jerry Fisher	
1948	Man-Eater of Kumaon	Dr. John Collins	
1948	Sorry, Wrong Number	Doctor Alexander	
1949	The Accused	Lieutenant Ted Dorgan	
1949	Any Number Can Play	Robbin Elcott	
1949	Holiday Affair	Carl Davis	
1950	The File on Thelma Jordon	Cleve Marshall	
1950	No Sad Songs for Me	Brad Scott	
1950	The Furies	Rip Darrow	
1950	Harriet Craig	Walter Craig	
1951	The Great Missouri Raid	Frank James	
1951	Rich, Young and Pretty	Jim Stauton Rogers	
1951	The Wild Blue Yonder	Captain Harold Calvert	
1952	The Wild North	Constable Pedley	
1952	Carbine Williams	Captain H.T. Peoples	
1952	My Man and I	Ansel Ames	
1953	Jamaica Run	Todd Dacey	
1953	Laughing Anne	Captain Davidson	
1954	Hell's Half Acre	Chet Chester	
1954	Rear Window	Detective Lieutenant Thomas J. "Tom" Doyle	
1955	The Big Knife	Smiley Coy	
1956	The Killer Is Loose	Leon Poole	
1956	The Bold and the Brave	Dave Fairchild	
1956	The Rack	Major Sam Moulton	
1956	The Rainmaker	Deputy Sheriff J.S. File	
1957	Loving You	Walter "Tex" Warner	
1958	The Light in the Forest	Wilse Owens	
1958	Alfred Hitchcock Presents	Timber Woods	Season 4 Episode 1: "Poison"
1959	Alias Jesse James	T.J. "Jesse" James	
1964	Blood on the Arrow	Clint Mailer	
1966	Agent for H.A.R.M.	Jim Graff	
1966	Broken Sabre	Major Whitcomb	(episodes of Branded edited for a feature film)
1966	Women of the Prehistoric Planet	Admiral David King	
1966	Waco	Preacher Sam Stone	
1966	Cyborg 2087	Sheriff	
1966	Picture Mommy Dead	Lawyer Clayborn	
1967	Red Tomahawk	Sy Elkins	
1968	Buckskin	Rep Marlowe	
1968	The Star Maker	Paul Lemont	
1968	The Astro-Zombies	Holman	(final film role)

== Radio appearances ==
Year	Program	Episode/source
1952	Cavalcade of America	Away Boarders
1952	Broadway Playhouse	The Big Clock
1953	Theatre Guild on the Air	Kate Fennigate
1953	Stars over Hollywood	Bus Driver's Holiday

Non-profit organization positions
Preceded by Valentine Davies	President of Academy of Motion Pictures, Arts and Sciences; 1961–1963	Succeeded by Arthur Freed
