= Red Tomahawk =

1967 film by R. G. Springsteen

- Theatrical release poster
- Directed by: R. G. Springsteen
- Screenplay by: Steve Fisher
- Story by: Andrew Craddock; Steve Fisher
- Produced by: A. C. Lyles
- Starring: Howard Keel; Joan Caulfield; Broderick Crawford; Scott Brady; Wendell Corey; Richard Arlen; Tom Drake
- Cinematography: W. Wallace Kelley
- Edited by: John F. Schreyer
- Music by: Jimmie Haskell
- Production company: A.C. Lyles Productions
- Distributed by: Paramount Pictures
- Release date: January 1, 1967
- Running time: 82 minutes
- Country: United States
- Language: English

Red Tomahawk is a 1967 American Western film directed by R. G. Springsteen and written by Steve Fisher. The film stars Howard Keel, Joan Caulfield, Broderick Crawford, Scott Brady, Wendell Corey, Richard Arlen and Tom Drake. The film was released on January 1, 1967, by Paramount Pictures.

== Plot ==
Army Captain Tom York is sent to contact General Custer at Little Big Horn, however by the time he arrives, all he finds is the massacred 7th Cavalry and the Sioux walking around. Tom York rides into the town of Deadwood in order to find a telegraph that he can use to warn the other regiments heading towards Custer's former location. The locals mistake York for a deserter until his friend Ep Wyatt vouches for him.

Somewhere in the area is hidden a pair of Gatling guns, which would be vital to fending off such an assault. The only person who knows the hiding place is Dakota Lil, a saloonkeeper who already has lost her husband and son in battle and wants no more part of it.

Ultimately persuaded by York to reveal where the guns are, they are betrayed by a gambler, Elkins, who intends to sell them to the enemy for a profit. York and others manage to get them back, and once everyone in town is safe, he decides to put down roots there with Dakota Lil.

== Cast ==
- Howard Keel as Capt. Tom York
- Joan Caulfield as Dakota Lil McCoy
- Broderick Crawford as Columbus Smith
- Scott Brady as Ep Wyatt
- Wendell Corey as Sy Elkins
- Richard Arlen as Deadwood Telegrapher
- Tom Drake as Bill Kane
- Tracy Olsen as Sal
- Ben Cooper as Lt. Drake
- Don "Red" Barry as Bly
- Regis Parton as Prospector #3
- Gerald Jann as Wu Sing
- Roy Jenson as Prospector
- Dan White as Ned Crone
- Henry Wills as Samuels
- Sol Gorss as Townsman / Roulette Player

== See also ==
- List of American films of 1967
