= Fort Utah (film) =

1967 film by Lesley Selander

- Directed by: Lesley Selander
- Written by: Steve Fisher; Andrew Craddock
- Produced by: A. C. Lyles
- Starring: John Ireland; Virginia Mayo
- Cinematography: Lothrop B. Worth
- Edited by: John F. Schreyer
- Music by: Jimmie Haskell
- Distributed by: Paramount Pictures
- Release date: September 1967
- Running time: 84 minutes
- Country: United States
- Language: English

Fort Utah is a 1967 American Western film and the 150th feature film directed by Lesley Selander. Produced by A. C. Lyles for Paramount, it starred John Ireland and Virginia Mayo.

== Plot ==
A former gunslinger, Tom Horn, has to fight off a renegade cavalryman and his band of outlaws who are terrorising pioneer settlers and the local Indians.

== Cast ==
- John Ireland - Tom Horn
- Virginia Mayo - Linda Lee
- Scott Brady - Dajin
- John Russell - Eli Jonas
- Robert Strauss - Ben Stokes
- Richard Arlen - Sam Tyler
- James Craig - Bo Greer
- Jim Davis - Scarecrow
- Don 'Red' Barry - Harris
- Read Morgan - Cavalry Lieutenant
- Regis Parton - Rafe
- Eric Cody - Shirt

== See also ==
- List of American films of 1967
