= Rogue's Gallery (1968 film) =

1968 film

- Directed by: Leonard Horn
- Written by: Steve Fisher; A.C. Lyles
- Produced by: A.C. Lyles
- Starring: Roger Smith; Greta Baldwin; Dennis Morgan
- Cinematography: Conrad L. Hall
- Edited by: John F. Schreyer
- Music by: Jimmie Haskell
- Production company: A.C. Lyles Productions
- Distributed by: Paramount Pictures
- Release date: 1968
- Running time: 87 minutes
- Country: United States
- Language: English

Rogue's Gallery is a 1968 mystery film produced by A.C. Lyles for Paramount Pictures that was directed by Leonard Horn and starring Roger Smith, Greta Baldwin and Dennis Morgan.

The film's sets were designed by the art directors Roland Anderson and Hal Pereira.

== Plot ==
Private detective John Rogue becomes fascinated about the case of an attractive but suicidal young woman.

== Cast ==
- Roger Smith as John Rogue
- Greta Baldwin as Valerie York
- Dennis Morgan as Dr. Jonas Pettingill
- Edgar Bergen as Roy Benz
- Brian Donlevy as Detective Lee
- Farley Granger as Edmund Van Dermot
- Mala Powers as Maggie
- Richard Arlen as Man in Club
- Jackie Coogan as Funeral Director
- Johnnie Ray as Police Officer
- William 'Billy' Benedict as Jocko
- Robert Riordan as Oscar Ludman
- Lee Delano as Swen
- Bob Hoy as Collins
- Craig Littler as Wheeler
- Marcia Mae Jones as Mrs. Hassanover

== Bibliography ==
- Roberts, Jerry. Encyclopedia of Television Film Directors. Scarecrow Press, 2009.
