= Waco (1966 film) =

1966 film by R. G. Springsteen

- Theatrical release poster
- Directed by: R. G. Springsteen
- Written by: Max Lamb; Harry Sanford
- Screenplay by: Steve Fisher
- Produced by: A. C. Lyles
- Starring: Howard Keel; Jane Russell; Brian Donlevy; Wendell Corey; Terry Moore; John Smith
- Cinematography: Robert Pittack
- Edited by: Bernard Matis
- Music by: Jimmie Haskell
- Color process: Technicolor
- Production company: A.C. Lyles Productions
- Distributed by: Paramount Pictures
- Release dates: June 25, 1966 (Reno, Nevada); September 1, 1966 (United States)
- Running time: 85 minutes
- Country: United States
- Language: English

Waco is a 1966 American Western film directed by R. G. Springsteen and starring Howard Keel, Jane Russell, Brian Donlevy, Wendell Corey, Terry Moore, John Smith, and Jeff Richards.

== Plot ==
Emporia, Wyoming is a lawless town in need of a new sheriff. Preacher Sam Stone and businessman George Gates suggest that Mayor Ned West release gunfighter Waco from jail to take up the job. At first, the mayor rejects Gates' suggestion, but when his daughter is assaulted, West decides it is time to pardon Waco.

Waco rides into town and immediately cleans it up, defying political boss Joe Gore by becoming sheriff, firing the deputy and bringing in old partner Ace Ross to be by his side. Preacher Stone's wife Jill, who used to be involved with Waco before meeting her current husband, leaves town for fear of incurring Waco's wrath. Also unhappy is rancher Ma Jenner, whose sons Ike and Pete seek revenge on her behalf for Waco's murder of their brother. Waco is outnumbered, particularly after Ace abandons him, but the mayor and preacher come to his aid. Gore and the Jenners die in the final battle, but so does Preacher Stone, which means Jill and Waco can be together again.

== Cast ==
- Howard Keel as Waco
- Jane Russell as Jill Stone
- Brian Donlevy as Ace Ross
- Wendell Corey as Preacher Sam Stone
- Terry Moore as Dolly
- John Smith as Joe Gore
- John Agar as George Gates
- Gene Evans as Deputy Sheriff Jim O'Neill
- Richard Arlen as Sheriff Billy Kelly
- Ben Cooper as Scotty Moore
- Tracy Olsen as Patricia West
- DeForest Kelley as Bill Rile
- Anne Seymour as Ma Jenner
- Robert Lowery as Mayor Ned West
- Willard Parker as Pete Jenner
- Jeff Richards as Kallen
- Regis Parton as Ike Jenner (as Reg Parton)
- Fuzzy Knight as Telegraph Operator
- Russ McCubbin as Drover
- Don White as Townsman
- King Johnson as Townsman
- Barbara Latell as Townswoman
- Boyd 'Red' Morgan as Kallen's Gunslinger
