= Town Tamer =

1965 film by Lesley Selander

- Theatrical release poster
- Directed by: Lesley Selander
- Screenplay by: Frank Gruber
- Based on: His novel Town Tamer 1957
- Produced by: A. C. Lyles
- Starring: Dana Andrews; Terry Moore; Pat O'Brien; Lon Chaney Jr. Bruce Cabot; Lyle Bettger; Richard Arlen
- Cinematography: W. Wallace Kelley
- Edited by: George A. Gittens
- Music by: Jimmie Haskell
- Production company: A.C. Lyles Productions
- Distributed by: Paramount Pictures
- Release date: July 7, 1965
- Running time: 89 minutes
- Country: United States
- Language: English

Town Tamer is a 1965 American Western film directed by Lesley Selander, written by Frank Gruber, and starring Dana Andrews, Terry Moore, Pat O'Brien, Lon Chaney Jr., Bruce Cabot, Lyle Bettger and Richard Arlen. It was released on July 7, 1965, by Paramount Pictures.

== Plot ==
Saloon owner Riley Condor pays Lee Ring $2000 to kill aged gunman-for-hire Tom Rosser. In attempting to shoot Rosser in the back at night, Ring misses and kills Rosser's wife instead. Rosser goes to Great Plains, supposedly to look over property, but his agenda is to kill Condor. Word gets around that Rosser is in town and Condor realizes that his gunslinging henchmen, Horsinger, Tavenner, Slim Akins, Flon and Ring, are no match for Rosser, and he sets in motion a plan that will use the law to eliminate Rosser.

== Cast ==
- Dana Andrews as Tom Rosser
- Terry Moore as Susan Tavenner
- Pat O'Brien as Judge Murcott
- Lon Chaney Jr. as Mayor Charlie Leach
- Bruce Cabot as Riley Condor
- Lyle Bettger as Lee Ring / Marshal Les Parker
- Richard Arlen as Doctor Kent
- Barton MacLane as James Fenimore Fell
- Richard Jaeckel as Deputy Johnny Honsinger
- Philip Carey as Jim Akins
- Sonny Tufts as Carmichael
- Coleen Gray as Carol Rosser
- DeForest Kelley as Guy Tavenner
- Jeanne Cagney as Mary Donley
- Don "Red" Barry as 'Tex'
- James Brown as Davis
- Richard Webb as Kevin
- Roger Torrey as Mike Flon
- Robert Ivers as Cowboy
- Bob Steele as Ken
- Dale Van Sickel as Bartender
- Dinny Powell as Cook
- Frank Gruber as Hotel Clerk

== See also ==
- List of American films of 1965
