= Lester Shorr =

American cinematographer

- Born: April 11, 1907; Brooklyn, New York, U.S.
- Died: July 28, 1992 (aged 85); Los Angeles, California, U.S.
- Occupation: Cinematographer

Lester Shorr (April 11, 1907 - July 28, 1992) was an American cinematographer. He won a Primetime Emmy Award in the category Outstanding Cinematography for his work on the television program Medic.

Shorr died on July 28, 1992 in Los Angeles, California, at the age of 85.
