= Johnny Reno =

1966 film by R. G. Springsteen

- 1966 US Theatrical Poster
- Directed by: R. G. Springsteen
- Written by: Andrew Craddock; Steve Fisher
- Produced by: A. C. Lyles
- Starring: Dana Andrews; Jane Russell
- Cinematography: Harold E. Stine
- Edited by: Bernard Matis
- Music by: Jimmie Haskell
- Color process: Technicolor
- Production company: A.C. Lyles Productions
- Distributed by: Paramount Pictures
- Release date: March 9, 1966
- Running time: 83 minutes
- Country: United States
- Language: English

Johnny Reno is a 1966 American Western film made by A. C. Lyles Productions and released by Paramount Pictures. It starred Dana Andrews, Jane Russell, John Agar and Lon Chaney Jr. It was directed by R. G. Springsteen, produced by A. C. Lyles, with a screenplay by Andrew Craddock, Steve Fisher and A.C. Lyles.

== Plot ==
U.S. Marshal Johnny Reno is on his way to the town of Stone Junction on personal business. As he rides through the desert, the fugitive Conners brothers see him and believe he is tracking them. They open fire on him from ambush. Reno is able to defeat the pair, wounding Joe and killing his brother Ed. He takes Joe into custody, retrieves Ed's body and rides with them for Stone Junction. On the way, Joe explains that a posse from the town has been after them, along with the local Native American tribe, led by Chief Little Bear. Encountering several warriors from the tribe, Reno refuses to turn over his prisoner and tells them to explain to Chief Little Bear that Reno, who he recognizes as a man of honor, swears to him that he will seek justice.

Arriving in Stone Junction, Reno is immediately accosted by the mayor, Jess Yates, and the town sheriff, Hodges. Hodges tells Reno he won't put the prisoner in his jail and Yates demands that Reno turn Connors over to him. Reno refuses and browbeats Hodges into allowing him to put Conners in his jail, infuriating Yates. A number of the people of the town openly show hostility to Reno, even attempting to shoot Conners in the street, including Yates's daughter. Reno inquires after Nona Williams, a girl he once was in love with whom he left years ago after she helped her brother escape from Reno's jail, thinking he was innocent. It turned out her brother was guilty and ended up killing several people while on the run, including his own father. Reno is told by Sheriff Hodges that Nona now owns and runs the local saloon, and Reno goes there looking for her, only to find Yates and his friends instead. While having a drink, Yates threatens Reno and orders him to leave town without his prisoner. When Reno refuses, Yates attacks him and the two men fight. Reno is able to defeat Yates and goes back to the jail, where he finds out that Sheriff Hodges has passed out rifles to some of the townsfolk on Yates's orders.

Reno is suspicious but asks where Nona would be if not in the saloon, and Hodges sends him to Nona's ranch outside of town. Reno rides off to see her. Meanwhile, Yates gathers his men who are armed with the rifles from the sheriff's office. Reno arrives at the ranch and starts to talk to Nona about their past, but they are interrupted by two of Yates's henchmen and held at gunpoint. Reno grows suspicious and voices a theory—that maybe Conners is in fact innocent and the townsfolk want him silenced. The two henchmen inform him that it doesn't matter, and that they'll just hold him at the ranch until Conners is dead. Reno manages to throw a piece of furniture at the guards, distracting them long enough for him to draw and shoot them both dead. He reconciles with Nona and sets off for the town, where he arrives just in time to prevent Hodges from turning Conners over to the armed mob outside. Reno holds the crowd at gunpoint and has Hodges disarm them. The sheriff, his backbone strengthened by reinforcements, seizes the rifles back. Reno and Hodges hole up in the jail where Reno questions Conners and learns that he and his brothers were strangers in town who were plied with drink by the "friendly" townsfolk. After being called out into the street to check their horses, Chief Little Bears's son rode by and then appeared to be shot down by a hail of bullets from everywhere, after which the Conners brothers were accused of the crime by an angry mob. Taking advantage of a momentary distraction, Joe and Ed fled into the desert. Reno begins to put the pieces together and realizes that the mayor and his friends likely were the ones who actually killed the Chief's son and are framing Conners to appease the chief and the tribe.

After this, Hodges notices a disturbance in the street and they emerge to find the mayor and his men organizing an evacuation of the town under the guise of fear of an Indian attack. All the women but Nona leave the town along with the children and most of the men. Only about a dozen of Yates's confederates stay behind to "defend" the town. Hodges is now convinced of the guilt of the mayor and agrees to follow Reno's lead, but they are barricaded in the jail with no one left in town but the hostile men. Night falls, and Yates takes Nona prisoner and sets up an ambush in the street. He baits Reno by loudly playing a song memorable to Reno and Nona on the player piano. Reno leaves the jail, telling Hodges to cover him. When the men notice Reno is in the street, they leave the saloon and Nona is able to escape. Reno and the rogue townsfolk start shooting at each other in the street. When one man almost shoots Reno in the back, he is killed by Sheriff Hodges, but Hodges is killed in the ensuing shootout.

Reno makes it back into the jail, frees and arms Conners, and tells him to watch the back door. Yates and his men approach with a wagon and torches, intending to burn them out of the jail. Reno sends Nona to get help and sets up on the jail roof with some dynamite. He succeeds in killing several of the attackers and scattering the others and sneaks back inside. Conners kills one man who tried to kill Reno as he returns to the back door of the jail. The situation continues until sunup when one man loses his nerve and deserts Yates, riding into the desert where he is captured and tortured for the truth by Little Bear's tribe: Yates and his friends killed the chief's son because he fell in love with the mayor's daughter, who is half Native American. Yates does not want anyone to know that he was once married to a Native American woman.

At the town, Conners, having had enough, manages to surprise Reno and knock him unconscious. He is unwilling to let Reno die for him and attempts to surrender in exchange for Reno's safety. Instead, Yates takes them both into the street where they are told what really happened and that the story will be that Conners killed Reno trying to escape. Chief Little Bear and his tribe arrive with their prisoner just in time. The prisoner tells Yates he confessed, only to immediately be shot dead by the mayor. The tribe's warriors and the renegades begin exchanging bullets. In the confusion, Reno is able to break free. He and Conners fight along with the tribe, and kill Yates and all his men. Yates is able to be killed because his foot gets caught in a rope laying on the ground, which turns out to be the noose which he had intended for the Conners brothers. Afterwards, Reno rides to the fort and tells the townsfolk and the mayor's daughter what really happened. He encourages the people to go back to the town and rebuild. He and Nona then depart to start their lives together.

== Cast ==
- Dana Andrews as Marshal Johnny Reno
- Jane Russell as Nona Williams
- Lon Chaney Jr. as Sheriff Hodges (as Lon Chaney)
- John Agar as Ed Tomkins
- Lyle Bettger as Mayor Jess Yates
- Tom Drake as Joe Conners
- Richard Arlen as Ned Duggan
- Robert Lowery as Jake Reed
- Tracy Olsen as Marie Yates
- Reg Parton as Charlie - Bartender (as Reg Parton)
- Rodd Redwing as Indian Brave
- Charles Horvath as Wooster
- Dale Van Sickel as Ab Conners
- Paul Daniel as Chief Indian Chief
- Chuck Hicks as Bellows
- Edmund Cobb Townsman
