= A. C. Lyles =

American film producer (1918-2013)

A.C. Lyles
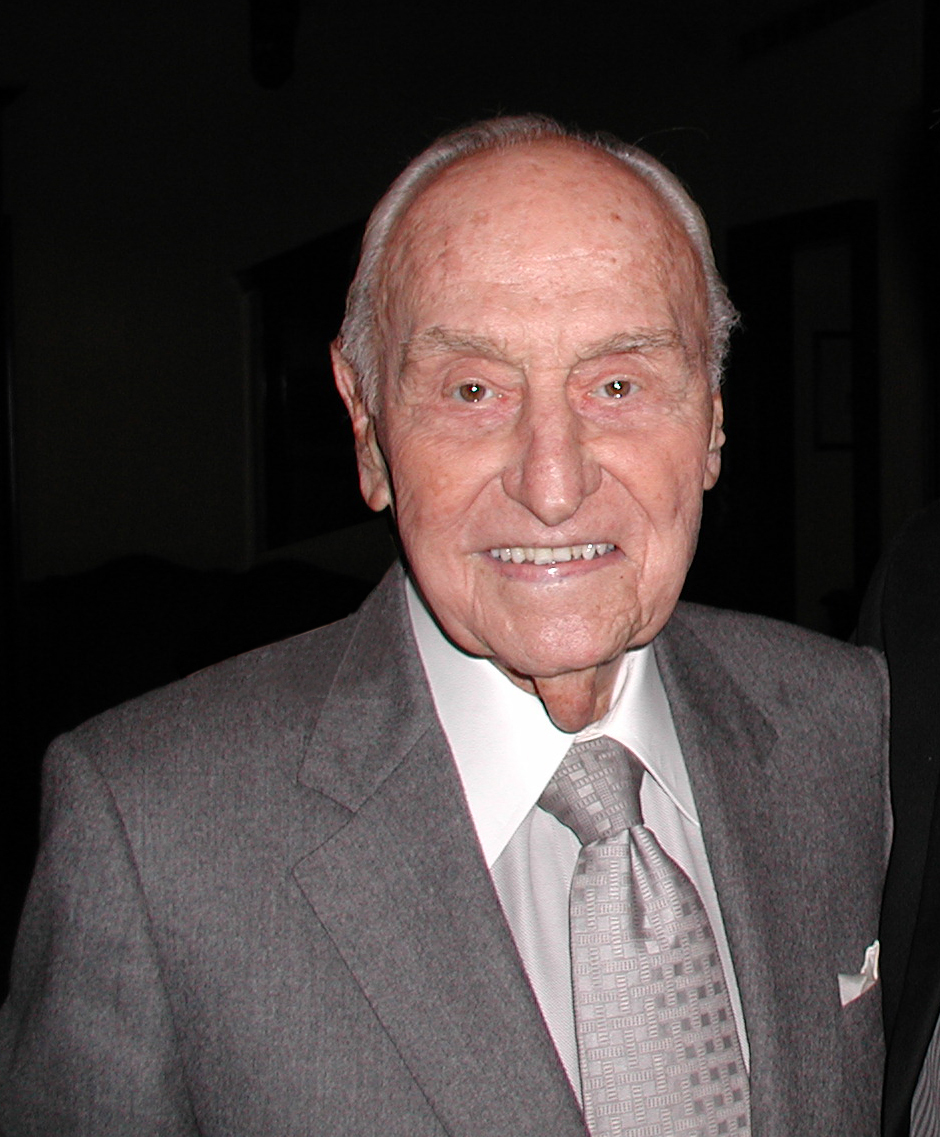
- A.C. Lyles in November 2009
- Born: Andrew Craddock Lyles Jr. May 17, 1918; Jacksonville, Florida, U.S.
- Died: September 27, 2013 (aged 95); Los Angeles, California, U.S.
- Occupation: Film producer
- Spouses: Martha Vickers (m. 1948; div. 1948) Martha French (m. 1955)

Andrew Craddock Lyles Jr. (May 17, 1918 – September 27, 2013) was an American film producer for Paramount Pictures, who is best known for producing a variety of Westerns in the 1950s and '60s (eight of which co-starred Lon Chaney Jr.).

== Career ==
Born in Jacksonville, Florida, Lyles began working for Paramount Studios after high school. He began as an office boy, worked in the publicity department of Pine-Thomas Productions, the second feature unit of Paramount, and eventually became assistant to the producer on The Mountain, released in 1954. His first role as full producer was on James Cagney's sole directorial effort, the 1957 Short Cut to Hell (a remake of the 1941 noir classic This Gun for Hire). He also produced nine episodes of the television show Rawhide then the Korean War film The Young and the Brave for Metro-Goldwyn-Mayer.

In an interview with Alex Simon and Donald Keith, Lyles recalled he was approached by Paramount to do a Western when they realized they had none on their schedule of releases. When Law of the Lawless did well at the box office, Paramount asked him how many more he could do a year. Lyles replied "five" and he was given the go ahead to produce more second features for the studio. Lyles filled his casts with many older, experienced actors who were his friends, such as Lon Chaney Jr. and Scott Brady, etc. Film director Joe Dante commented on the Westerns being "guilty pleasures" of his, stating that "Their total absence of style or substance makes for prototypical filmgoing, where the reward lies in the simple appreciation of basic craftsmanship and Hollywood myth-making."

Lyles continued to produce a variety of low-budget traditional Westerns for Paramount in the 1960s, as well as other movies in other genres, such as the detective drama Rogue's Gallery in 1968, and the science-fiction film Night of the Lepus, for MGM, that featured the American Southwest menaced by giant mutant rabbits.

On March 3, 1988, Lyles was awarded a star on the Hollywood Walk of Fame located at 6840 Hollywood Blvd.

Lyles' last work was as consulting producer on the HBO television series Deadwood, created by David Milch.

== Personal ==
Lyles married actress Martha Vickers in March 1948, but the couple divorced that September.

He married Martha French in 1955 (their marriage lasting 58 years).

On September 27, 2013, Lyles died at his Los Angeles home. He was 95 and survived by his 2nd wife; he had no children.

== Filmography ==
Note = * indicates "co-starring Lon Chaney Jr."

Year	Title	Role	Notes	Distributor
1960	Raymie	Producer	Film	Allied Artists Pictures
1963	The Young and the Brave	Producer	Film	Metro Goldwyn Mayer
1964	Law of the Lawless *	Producer	Film	Paramount Pictures
1964	Stage to Thunder Rock *	Producer	Film	Paramount Pictures
1964	Young Fury *	Producer	Film	Paramount Pictures
1965	Black Spurs *	Producer	Film	Paramount Pictures
1965	Town Tamer *	Producer	Film	Paramount Pictures
1965	Apache Uprising *	Producer	Film	Paramount Pictures
1966	Johnny Reno *	Producer	Film	Paramount Pictures
1966	Waco	Producer	Film	Paramount Pictures
1967	Red Tomahawk	Producer	Film	Paramount Pictures
1967	Hostile Guns	Producer	Film	Paramount Pictures
1967	Fort Utah	Producer	Film	Paramount Pictures
1968	Arizona Bushwhackers	Producer	Film	Paramount Pictures
1968	Buckskin *	Producer	Film	Paramount Pictures
1968	Rogue's Gallery	Producer	Film	Paramount Pictures
1972	Night of the Lepus	Producer	Film	Metro Goldwyn Mayer
1975	The Last Day	Producer	TV movie	
1977	Flight to Holocaust	Producer	TV movie	
1979	A Christmas for Boomer	Producer	TV movie	
1990	The Hunt for Red October	Advisor #1	Film	Paramount Pictures
