= Steve Fisher (writer) =

American author (1912–1980)

- Born: August 29, 1912; Marine City, Michigan, U.S.
- Died: March 27, 1980 (aged 67); Canoga Park, Los Angeles, U.S.
- Other names: Grant Lane; Stephen Gould
- Occupations: Author of pulp stories, novels, and screenplays
- Years active: 1930–1980

Stephen Gould Fisher (August 29, 1912 – March 27, 1980) was an American author best known for his pulp stories, novels and screenplays. He is one of the few pulp authors to go on to enjoy success as both an author in "slick" magazines, such as the Saturday Evening Post, and as an in-demand writer in Hollywood.

== Early life ==
Steve Fisher was born August 29, 1912, in Marine City, Michigan. He was raised in Los Angeles, California, where he attended Oneonta Military Academy until running away to join the Navy at the age of sixteen. Fisher spent four years in the Navy submarine service, during which time he wrote prolifically, selling stories to U.S. Navy and Our Navy.

After Fisher's discharge from the Navy, he settled in Greenwich Village, New York, where he decided to pursue writing as a career. The first few months proved difficult. Fisher could not sell a story and suffered eviction from two apartments, and once had his electricity shut off. In March 1934, however, he would publish his first story, "Hell’s Scoop," in Sure-Fire Detective Magazine, beginning a career of considerable literary success.

== Pulp years ==
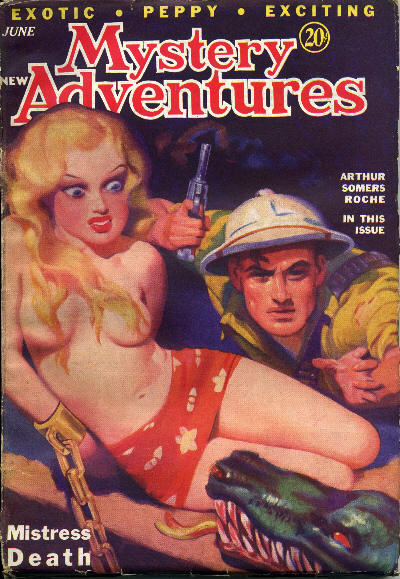
Fisher's "Mistress Death" was the cover story on the May–June 1936 issue of New Mystery Adventures

Fisher published extensively in pulps throughout the 1930s, ‘40s and into the ‘50s. Magazines that featured his stories include Spicy Mystery Stories, Thrilling Detective, True Gang Life, Detective Fiction Weekly, The Shadow, New Mystery Adventures, Underground Detective, The Mysterious Fu Wang, The Phantom Detective, Ace Detective, Saucy Romantic Adventures, Mystery Adventure, Detective Tales, The Whisperer, Headquarters Detective, Hardboiled, Doc Savage, Feds, Federal Agent, Popular Detective, Clues, Detective Romances, Crime Busters, Pocket Detective and Detective Story Magazine.

Some of Fisher’s most significant stories, however, would be published in Black Mask, the seminal detective magazine. Famous Mask editor Joe Shaw rejected early submissions by Fisher, but under the editorship of Fanny Ellsworth, Fisher would help create a more emotional, psychological crime story, different from his hard-boiled Mask predecessors. Fisher stated, "[My] subjective style, mood and approach to a story was the antithesis of [a] Roger Torrey who, like Hammett, wrote objectively, with crisp, cold precision". "The more emotionally charged style caught on and was featured in a number of detective pulps," helping to establish a place for similar authors, such as Fisher's friend Cornell Woolrich. In total Fisher would publish nine stories in Black Mask: "Death of a Dummy," "Flight to Paris," "Hollywood Party," "Jake and Jill," "Latitude Unknown," "Murder at Eight," "No Gentleman Strangles His Wife," "Wait for Me," "You’ll Always Remember Me,".

Fisher would also break into slick magazines during this period, a rare feat for a pulp writer. His stories saw simultaneous publication in pulps and in slicks such as Liberty, Collier's, The Saturday Evening Post, Cosmopolitan and American Magazine to name a few. He would also publish under the pennames Stephen Gould and Grant Lane, and would go on to publish hundreds of stories in pulp and slick magazines including Lt. Commander Sheridan Doome detective novels.

== Later life ==
Struggling financially, Fisher moved to Paris in 1939 to work and live more affordably. After only six months, his agent, H. N. Swanson, sold the stories "If You Break My Heart" and "Shore Leave" to Hollywood for film adaptation. Fisher returned to Hollywood where he would work for much of the remainder of his life as a screenwriter. Fisher wrote the screenplays for such notable films noir as Dead Reckoning and Lady in the Lake. He would also spend time writing novels, most notably I Wake Up Screaming (1941), which was made into a film that same year starring Victor Mature. A remake followed in 1953, Vicki, starring Jeanne Crain and Jean Peters. Both films deviate from the original story, nobably shifting the action from Hollywood to New York. During the 1970s, Fisher wrote for series television, including such shows as Starsky & Hutch, McMillan & Wife and Barnaby Jones. He died of a heart attack on March 27, 1980, at his home in Canoga Park, Los Angeles, age 67.

== Selected bibliography ==
- Spend the Night (1935) — as by Grant Lane
- Satan’s Angel (1935)
- Forever Glory (1936)
- Murder of the Admiral (1936) — as by Stephen Gould
- Murder of the Pigboat Skipper (1937)
- The Night Before Murder (1939)
- Homicide Johnny (1940) — as by Stephen Gould
- Destroyer (1941)
- I Wake Up Screaming (1941)
- Destination Tokyo (1943)
- Winter Kill (1946)
- Be Still My Heart (1952)
- The Sheltering Night (1952)
- Giveaway (1954)
- Take All You Can Get (1955)
- No House Limit: A Novel of Las Vegas (1958)
- Image of Hell (1961)
- Saxon's Ghost (1969)
- The Big Dream (1970)
- The Hell-Black Night (1970)

== Selected filmography ==
- Typhoon (1940)
- I Wake Up Screaming (1941)
- To the Shores of Tripoli (1942)
- Berlin Correspondent (1942)
- Destination Tokyo (1943)
- Johnny Angel (1945)
- Lady in the Lake (1946)
- Dead Reckoning (1947)
- Song of the Thin Man (1947)
- The Hunted (1947)
- I Wouldn't Be in Your Shoes (1948)
- Flat Top (1952)
- City That Never Sleeps (1953)
- 36 Hours (a.k.a. Terror Street) (1953)
- Hell's Half Acre (1954)
- The Shanghai Story (1954)
- Las Vegas Shakedown (1955)
- Toughest Man Alive (1955)
- Betrayed Women (1955)
- Silent Fear (1956)
- Law of the Lawless (1963)
- Johnny Reno (1966)

== Selected TV series ==
- Schlitz Playhouse (1955–56) [4 episodes]
- The Jane Wyman Show (1955–58) [4 episodes]
- Tales of Wells Fargo (1957–60) [13 episodes]
- Miami Undercover (1961) [12 episodes]
- King of Diamonds (1961–62) [3 episodes]
- U.S. Marshal (1962–63) [4 episodes]
- Ripcord (1962–63) [12 episodes]
- Lawbreakers (1963) [3 episodes]
- Starsky & Hutch (1976–77) [3 episodes]
- Fantasy Island (1978–81) [13 episodes]

== Sources ==
- Fisher, Steve. "The Navy Markets." The Author & Journalist, December 1933.
- Fisher, Steve. "A Literary Roller Coaster." Writer's 1941 Year Book.
- Gruber, Frank. The Pulp Jungle. Los Angeles: Sherbourne, 1967. Print.
- Hagemann, E. R. A Comprehensive Index to Black Mask, 1920–1951. Bowling Green: Bowling Green UPP, 1982. Print.
- Nolan, William F. The Black Mask Boys: Masters in the Hard-Boiled School of Detective Fiction. New York: Morrow, 1985. Print.
- Penzler, Otto. The Black Lizard Big Book of Black Mask Stories. New York: Black Lizard, 2010. Print.
- ---. The Black Lizard Big Book of Pulps. New York: Black Lizard, 2007. Print.
- Restaino, Katherine M. "Steve Fisher." Dictionary of Literary Biography Vol. 226. Ed. George Parker Anderson and Julie B. Anderson. Detroit: Gale, 2000. Print. 140–48.
- Server, Lee. Danger Is My Business: An Illustrated History of the Fabulous Pulp Magazines. San Francisco: Chronicle, 1993. Print.
