= Klondike (TV series) =

- Genre: Western
- Starring: Ralph Taeger; James Coburn
- Composers: Vic Mizzy; Mann Curtis
- Country of origin: United States
- Original language: English
- No. of seasons: 1
- No. of episodes: 17

Production
- Producer: William Conrad
- Running time: ca. 25 mins.
- Production company: Ziv-United Artists

Original release
- Network: NBC
- Release: October 10, 1960 – February 13, 1961

Related
- Acapulco

Klondike is an American drama series about life in an Alaskan town in the 1890s during the Klondike Gold Rush. It stars Ralph Taeger and James Coburn and aired on NBC during the 1960–61 television season.

== Synopsis ==
Mike Halliday is a rugged outdoorsman who has come to Skagway in the District of Alaska in search of gold and adventure during the Klondike Gold Rush of 1896–1899. Halliday often comes into conflict with Jeff Durain, a fast-talking adventurer prone to making money by illegal means. Durain owns and operates a hotel in Skagway which offers the miners and prospectors who have come to town for the gold rush the opportunity to gamble, but the games usually are rigged for Durain's benefit.

Kathy O'Hara is the honest owner of another hotel in Skagway, and Halliday often works with her to block Durain from succeeding in his illegal schemes. Mike and Kathy have an affectionate relationship, but in his romantic life, Halliday plays the field, and is involved with a number of women, including Durain's girlfriend, the beautiful but greedy Goldie, who often is an accomplice in Durain's crimes.

== Cast ==
- Ralph Taeger...Mike Halliday
- James Coburn...Jefferson "Jeff" Durain
- Mari Blanchard...Kathy O'Hara
- Joi Lansing...Goldie

== Production ==
Ziv-United Artists Television produced Klondike on a low budget. William Conrad served as producer for the series. Vic Mizzy and Mann Curtis composed the show's theme music. The series was based on the book The Klondike Fever by Pierre Berton. It was an early lead role for James Coburn.

After Klondike was cancelled in mid-season, Ziv Television needed to fulfill its contract for the 1960–61 season with NBC, so Ralph Taeger and James Coburn immediately moved together to a new Ziv-produced series, Acapulco, in which they were cast as a pair of twentieth-century beachcombers in Acapulco, Mexico. Acapulco aired in Klondike′s time slot, premiering two weeks after the broadcast of Klondike′s last new episode.

== Broadcast history ==
Seventeen episodes of Klondike were produced. They aired on NBC on Mondays at 9:00 p.m. Eastern Time from October 10, 1960, to February 13, 1961.

== Episodes ==
No.	Title	Directed by	Written by	Original release date
1	"Klondike Fever"	William Conrad	Sam Peckinpah and Carey Wilbur (teleplay); Sam Peckinpah (story)	October 10, 1960
Mike Halliday is headed for the Klondike to search for gold, and while aboard a ship bound for Skagway, Alaska, he wins a lot of money from Jeff in a poker game. Mike outmaneuvers Durain's thugs when they try to get the money back, but all of Mike's money is stolen after Durain's girlfriend drugs his drink. After arriving in Skagway broke and hungover, Mike befriends Durain's business rival Kathy O'Hara. When Durain's men damage Kathy's hotel, Mike decides to get his money back form Durain and discourage him from attacking Kathy or her hotel again. Guest stars: Karl Swenson, Ray Teal, Sam Edwards, and Bob Bryant
2	"River of Gold"	Alvin Ganzer	Paul Savage Pierre Berton	October 17, 1960
Kathy's old friend Charley Morrison talks Mike into helping him search for a legendary lost "river of gold" marked on a Russian map. While Mike is out of town with Charley, Durain plots to add Kathy's profitable hotel to his real estate holdings. Guest stars: Forrest Lewis, L.Q. Jones, Larry Blake, Charles Reade, and Dick Bernie
3	"Saints and Stickups"	William Conrad	Richard Donavan Fritz Goodwin	October 24, 1960
After missionaries inspire Skagway to build a church, Durain takes over the building fund and uses his thugs to collect donations — and it does not seem that any of the money they collect will actually go toward building the church. Guest stars: Whit Bissell, Virginia Gregg, and L.Q. Jones
4	"The Unexpected Candidate"	Lawrence Dobkin	Monroe Manning	October 31, 1960
Durain runs for mayor of Skagway, planning to use the position to enrich himself. To prevent him from running unopposed, Mike brings in a surprising last-minute candidate who is seeking a "different" kind of gold. Guest stars: Judson Pratt, Robert E. Griffin, L.Q. Jones, Georgia Ellis, and Hal K. Dawson
5	"Keys to Trouble"	William D. Faralla	Stephen Alexander	November 7, 1960
Mike's plans to impress Kathy with the gift of a valuable piano go awry after a local man who is watching over Skagway′s jail sets all the prisoners free. They begin a lawless rampage in the Klondike, and a posse sets out from Skagway to capture the escaped outlaws. Guest stars: Wallace Ford, Charles Fredericks, William Hickman, and Donald Kerr
6	"Swonger's Mule"	Elliott Lewis	Jack Gariss Elliott Lewis Sam Peckinpah	November 14, 1960
After his mules are stolen, a man named Swoger must pack his goods across a mountain pass. Guest stars: Claude Akins, Jeanette Nolan, William Challee, and Frank Cady
7	"Sure Thing, Men"	Elliott Lewis	Jack Gariss Robert Hamner	November 21, 1960
A group of men from Skagway believes it will be easy to find a good mining site until they meet up with an old "sourdough" — slang for an longtime Alaska resident. Guest stars: Larry Pennell, Tyler McVey, Jack Albertson, Jan Stine, and William Woodson
8	"Taste of Danger"	William D. Faralla	Elliott Lewis Shirley Schiller	November 28, 1960
Mike and Durain have a dispute with some gold hijackers. Guest stars: Phillip Pine, Harry Lauter, Frank Ferguson, and Steven Gravers
9	"Bare Knuckles"	Jerry Hopper	Kathleen Hite	December 5, 1960
A group of men from Skagway gets to work — and really needs a rest at the end of the day. Guest stars: J. Pat O'Malley and Richard Kiel
10	"Halliday's Club"	Lawrence Dobkin	Marian Clark	December 12, 1960
Young Seth Bailey stows away on a ship bound for Skagway. He gets caught, and the first mate forces him into hard labor. When the ship docks at Skagway, Bailey escapes and seeks refuge with Mike. Guest stars: Jackie Coogan, Hugh Sanders, Charles Herbert, Charles Tannen, and Joseph Mell
11	"Bathhouse Justice"	Monroe P. Askins	Albert Aley	December 19, 1960
After a man kills someone along the trail to the Klondike, the citizens of Skagway use a bathhouse as a courtroom for his trial. Guest stars: Walter Burke, Nora Marlowe, Brett King, Britt Lomond, Milton Frome, Jerome Cowan, Claude Stroud, and N. J. Davis
12	"Swing Your Pa"	Lawerence Dobkin	Lou Houston	December 26, 1960
A group of men stops off at the bar in Skagway to relax and dance. Guest stars: Chuck Webster, George Kennedy, James Griffith, Troy Melton, and Karl Swenson
13	"The Golden Burro"	Elliott Lewis	Stephen Alexander	January 9, 1961
Mike sets up the Halliday Gold Protection Company, with a vault in which miners can store their gold dust safely, but customer Ed Nash stages a robbery of the company and the miners and prospectors lose everything they entrusted to Mike. The townspeople think Mike is the prime suspect in the robbery, and it takes an unexpected detective to set things straight — a burro that seems to have a knack for finding gold. Guest stars: Edgar Buchanan, Robert F. Simon, Howard McNear, and Robert Karnes
14	"Queen of the Klondike"	William D. Faralla	Lou Houston	January 16, 1961
After a heavy snowfall in Skagway, an ornery miner named Spunky comes into town demanding to be served eggs — just as Eli Roper eats the last egg in town. Meanwhile, a beautiful woman arrives in the Klondike. Guest stars: Jack Elam, Hank Patterson, Lane Bradford, John Qualen, and Tudor Owen
15	"The Man Who Owned Skagway"	Edward Montagne	Richard Donovan Robert Hamner	January 23, 1961
A man named "Soapy" Smith runs lawless Skagway, and when Mike and his companions return to Skagway they witness a gunfight between Smith and another man in which both men die. Guest stars: Lawrence Dobkin, Emory Parnell, Ralph Moody, and Raymond Hatton
16	"Sitka Madonna"	William Faralla	John T. Kelley	January 30, 1961
While heading home from a hunting trip, Mike and other men from Skagway stop to see the golden Madonna at Sitka, where a man dressed as a Russian Orthodox priest shoots Mike, then collapses. Guest stars: Patric Knowles, Ron Hayes, Frank Puglia, and Lilyan Chauvin
17	"The Hostages"	Elliott Lewis	Pierre Berton Richard Donovan Fred Freiberger	February 6, 1961
A group of renegade soldiers arrive in Skagway with a stolen Gatling gun to rob the First National Bank of Skagway. When they learn that Mike is the only person left alive who knows the combination to the bank vault, they take the townspeople — including Kathy and Goldie — hostage and threaten to shoot them if Mike does not come out of hiding. Mike reluctantly opens the vault for them, but hatches a plan to foil them before they can escape with the gold and some female hostages, Kathy and Goldie among them. Guest stars: Lon Chaney Jr., Chris Alcaide, Michael Raffetto, and Jack Petruzzi
