= Convict Stage =

1965 film

- Theatrical release poster
- Directed by: Lesley Selander
- Screenplay by: Daniel Mainwaring
- Story by: Don "Red" Barry
- Produced by: Hal Klein
- Starring: Harry Lauter; Don "Red" Barry; Jodi Mitchell; Hanna Landy; Joe Patridge; Eric Matthews
- Cinematography: Gordon Avil
- Edited by: John F. Schreyer
- Music by: Richard LaSalle
- Production company: 20th Century Fox
- Distributed by: 20th Century Fox
- Release date: June 17, 1965
- Running time: 71 minutes
- Country: United States
- Language: English

Convict Stage is a 1965 American Western film directed by Lesley Selander and written by Daniel Mainwaring. The film stars Harry Lauter, Don "Red" Barry, Jodi Mitchell, Hanna Landy, Joe Patridge, and Eric Matthews. The film was released on June 17, 1965, by 20th Century Fox.

== Plot ==
When the outlaw Sims brothers kill his sister during a stagecoach robbery, gunfighter Ben Lattimore (Harry Lauter) vows vengeance. When he learns that an old lawman, Marshall Jethro Karnin (Don "Red" Barry) has captured them, he considers shooting the brothers but then decides to ride along with the convict stagecoach to prevent against an attack and a possible rescue by their fellow gang members who are still on the loose. Neither Ben nor lawman Jethro Karnin, though, is aware that evil, gun-crazy Ma Sims is also a passenger on the stagecoach.

== Cast ==
- Harry Lauter as Ben Lattimore
- Don "Red" Barry as Marshall Jethro Karnin
- Jodi Mitchell as Sally Latttimore
- Hanna Landy as Mrs. Gregory/Sims
- Joe Patridge as Jeb Sims
- Eric Matthews as Johnny Sims
- Walter Reed as Sam Gill
- Michael Carr as Piute
- Fred Krone as Dixon
- George Sawaya as Adam Scott
- Karl MacDonald as Bates

== See also ==
- List of American films of 1965
