= Bigfoot (2012 film) =

- DVD cover
- Written by: Micho Rutare; Brian Brinkman
- Directed by: Bruce Davison
- Starring: Danny Bonaduce; Barry Williams; Sherilyn Fenn; Alice Cooper
- Music by: Chris Ridenhour
- Country of origin: United States
- Original language: English

Production
- Executive producer: David Rimawi
- Producers: David Michael Latt; Paul Bales
- Cinematography: Alex Yellen
- Editor: Rob Pallatina
- Running time: 89 minutes
- Production company: The Asylum

Original release
- Network: Syfy
- Release: June 30, 2012

Bigfoot (in China as King Kong 3) is a 2012 American action adventure film produced by Asylum and Syfy.

The film was directed by Bruce Davison who also stars as a local sheriff. It premiered on TV on June 30, 2012 and was released on DVD and Blu-ray on August 14, 2012. The film features a cameo by Alice Cooper playing himself. It is unrelated to the 1970 film of the same name.

== Plot ==
A hunter tries to shoot a bear to bring home as a trophy until a large, hairy creature attacks and kills him. The creature appeared to be the legendary monster Bigfoot who then goes back to his cave to sleep. He then attacks and kills an elderly couple by turning over their RV. When Bigfoot attacks a 1980s-themed rock concert in Deadwood, South Dakota, after the noise disturbed its hibernation, the cynical event organizer Harley Henderson (Danny Bonaduce) tries to kill the giant beast and create a tourist attraction around its stuffed body.

However, his former musical partner, Simon Quinn (Barry Williams), now an environmentalist, realizes the creature is the last of its species and is determined to make sure it does not become extinct. Harley goes to great lengths to kill the creature, in order to save his concert from being canceled, but Simon thinks that the creature is just protecting its territory from trespassers. Harley assembles a team of hunters and mercenaries to track down Bigfoot. A group of men and women try to capture Bigfoot on camera, but all of them get killed.

Simon uses a hang glider to spot the creature, while Harley and his men try to kill him. However, Bigfoot kills three men in the process. Harley uses a rifle to shoot down Simon's hang glider. Army helicopters pursue the creature, leading it straight to the concert. Most of Simon's activist friends get killed by Bigfoot or the National Guard for their interference. They evacuate the town to avoid more casualties.

With all her men killed, Sheriff Alvarez (Sherilyn Fenn) and her partner Gunderson (Bruce Davison) try to call off an air strike after they spot Henderson and Quinn on Mount Rushmore trying to trap the creature. Gunderson gets killed when Bigfoot kicks his patrol car into a tree, crushing Henderson. Gunderson tells Alvarez that she is a great sheriff and that her father would be proud. Unfortunately, Bigfoot is killed when attack jets fire missiles at him, destroying Mount Rushmore as well.

A year later, Mayor Tom Gillis, having survived his injuries, congratulates Henderson and Quinn for being heroes, and unveils a statue of them in their honor. Mount Rushmore is also being rebuilt as a new monument.

== Cast ==
- Danny Bonaduce as Daniel "Harley" Henderson
- Barry Williams as Simon Quinn
- Sherilyn Fenn as Sheriff Becky Alvarez
- Howard Hesseman as Mayor Tommy Gillis
- Bruce Davison as Sheriff Walt Gunderson
- Andre Royo as Al Gurney
- Stephanie Sarreal Park as Priya
- Cynthia Geary as Sueanne
- Noelia Rodriguez as Delia
- Toan Le as Alex
- Demetrius Sager as Max
- Ulric Dihle as Colonel Tifton
- Jennifer Ropella as Lynn
- John Paulsen as Andrew Laurich
- Rosslyn Luke as Tina Gould
- Sherril L. Johnson as Ashley
- Michael Patten as Barnes, One of Gurney's Men
- Mark Carr as Cooper
- Cordelia Storm Bickford as Kara
- Jason Nash as Logan
- Robert Alan Barnett as Steve
- Bob Bragg as Eddy (uncredited)
- Alice Cooper as Himself
- Gary Kasper as Bigfoot (voice)

== Release ==
On August 14, 2012 it was released on Blu-ray and DVD by Gaiam International and Asylum. Gaiam later re-released the film on July 9, 2013.

== Reception ==
Ian Jane from DVD Talk gave the film a negative review, writing, "Bigfoot is not scary, interesting or good - it is mildly amusing in a bad movie sort of way, and if you find yourself with an uncontrollable urge to seek whatever may lie at the bottom of the straight to video barrel you can have some fun with it, but yeah, this movie is awful." Craig McGee from HorrorNews.net hated the film, panning the film's dialogue, script, and overly preachy environmentalist message. Brett Gallman from Oh, the Horror! gave the film a negative review, calling it " a movie that's sometimes impossibly bad, especially because it's never quite that obvious just how aware it is of its own badness."
