= George Sawaya =

American actor and stuntman (1923–2003)

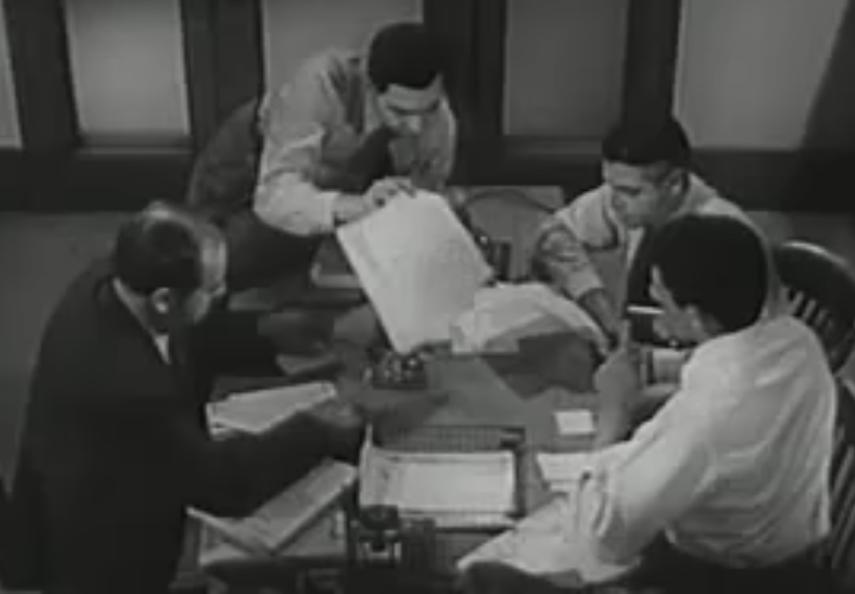
- Sawaya (right) with Jack Webb and Barney Phillips in Dragnet, 1951
- Born: George Frances Carey Sawaya; August 14, 1923; Los Angeles, California
- Died: September 17, 2003 (aged 80); Los Angeles, California
- Occupations: Actor, stuntman
- Years active: 1951–1984
- Spouses: Jean Olsen (div. 1955): Marlene Barr

George Frances Carey Sawaya (August 14, 1923 – September 17, 2003) was an American actor and stuntman. He was best known for playing the role of Detective Lopez on Jack Webb's Dragnet.

== Life and career ==
Sawaya was born in Los Angeles, California. He served in the United States Army during World War II. Sawaya began his career in 1951, first appearing in the film The Lady Says No, which starred Joan Caulfield and David Niven. He then made his debut as a stunt performer in 1952, where he appeared in the film The Narrow Margin. Sawaya performed as a double for actor Charles McGraw for the film. In the same year, he appeared in the films, With a Song in My Heart, starring Susan Hayward; Here Come the Marines, starring Leo Gorcey and What Price Glory, starring James Cagney, Corinne Calvet and Dan Dailey. Sawaya had then appeared in numerous films and television programs with actor Ernest Borgnine.

Sawaya appeared and performed as a stunt performer in numerous films, such as, Desert Legion (1953); Day of Triumph (1954); The Prodigal (1955); Andy Hardy Comes Home (1958); The Walking Target (1960); Five Weeks in a Balloon (1962); Come Blow Your Horn (1963); Fort Courageous (1965); Batman (1966); Hello, Dolly! (1969); Tora! Tora! Tora! (1970); Blazing Saddles (1974); St. Ives (1976); and Blade Runner (1982). His final film role was in the 1984 film Repo Man.

Sawaya began his television debut in 1952, where he played the role of the Hispanic character "Detective Lopez" on Jack Webb's Dragnet until 1957. He then made an appearance in the western series The Man Behind the Badge. Sawaya also made an appearance in the action and adventure television series Yancy Derringer. He made guest-starring appearances in Bonanza, The Wild Wild West, Mannix, Star Trek: The Original Series, The Man from U.N.C.L.E., The Rockford Files, The Time Tunnel, Mission: Impossible, Voyage to the Bottom of the Sea, Columbo, Kolchak: The Night Stalker and Get Smart. He also made an appearance in the legal drama television series Perry Mason episode, "The Case of the Malicious Mariner". His final television credit was from the science fiction television series The Powers of Matthew Star, which starred Peter Barton and Louis Gossett Jr.

== Death ==
Sawaya died in September 2003 in Studio City, California, at the age of 80. He was buried in Forest Lawn Memorial Park.

== Selected filmography ==
- The Lady Says No (1951) - Minor Role (uncredited)
- With a Song in My Heart (1952) - Soldier (uncredited)
- The Narrow Margin (1952) - Reporter (uncredited)
- Down Among the Sheltering Palms (1952) - Native (uncredited)
- Here Come the Marines (1952) - Soldier (uncredited)
- What Price Glory (1952) - Minor Role (uncredited)
- Tropic Zone (1953) - Minor Role (uncredited)
- Desert Legion (1953) - Soldier (uncredited)
- The Desert Song (1953) - Riff Guard (uncredited)
- A Lion Is in the Streets (1953) - Townsman (uncredited)
- Dragnet (1954) - McQueen (uncredited)
- Day of Triumph (1954) - James the Less (uncredited)
- The Prodigal (1955) - Kavak
- The Black Sleep (1956) - K6 - Sailor
- Emergency Hospital (1956) - Jack (uncredited)
- Hot Cars (1956) - Lt. Holmes (uncredited)
- Bop Girl Goes Calypso (1957) - Short Record Company Representative (uncredited)
- Andy Hardy Comes Home (1958) - Party Guest (uncredited)
- The Walking Target (1960) - Brodney's Driver (uncredited)
- Police Dog Story (1961) - Driver
- Man-Trap (1961) - Truck Driver (uncredited)
- Everything's Ducky (1961) - Simmons
- Hands of a Stranger (1962) - Tony Wilder
- Escape from Zahrain (1962) - Arab Guard Refinery Gate (uncredited)
- Five Weeks in a Balloon (1962) - Nomad Chief (uncredited)
- Diary of a Madman (1963) - Wagon Driver
- California (1963) - Soldier (uncredited)
- Drums of Africa (1963) - Arab
- Come Blow Your Horn (1963) - Minor Role (uncredited)
- Fort Courageous (1965) - Indian #2
- Convict Stage (1965) - Adam Scott
- The Money Trap (1965) - Angelo (uncredited)
- The Lollipop Cover (1965) - The Fighter
- Batman (1966) - Quetch
- The Young Warriors (1967)
- Sol Madrid (1968) - Dietrich Gunman
- Panic in the City (1968) - Karl Sinden (Mr. X)
- The Boston Strangler (1968) - Police Officer (uncredited)
- More Dead Than Alive (1969) - Guard Captain
- Sam Whiskey (1969)
- Justine (1969) - Tough (uncredited)
- Private Duty Nurses (1971) - Ahmed
- The Poseidon Adventure (1972) - Bos'n Mate (uncredited)
- The Don Is Dead (1973) - Garcia (uncredited)
- Blazing Saddles (1974) - Townsman (uncredited)
- Earthquake (1974) - Deputy Sheriff (uncredited)
- The Devil's Rain (1975) - Steve Preston
- Embryo (1976) - Policeman
- St. Ives (1976) - Arab Bagman
- The Domino Principle (1977) - Assassination Victim (uncredited)
- I Wanna Hold Your Hand (1978) - (uncredited)
- The Concorde ... Airport '79 (1979) - Girard
- Dead Men Don't Wear Plaid (1982) - Hood #3
- Repo Man (1984) - First Repo Victim (final film role)
