= Bigfoot (1970 film) =

1970 film

- Theatrical release poster
- Directed by: Robert F. Slatzer
- Written by: Robert F. Slatzer
- Produced by: Anthony Cardoza
- Starring: John Carradine; John Mitchum; Christopher Mitchum; Joi Lansing; Doodles Weaver; Lindsay Crosby
- Cinematography: Wilson S. Hong
- Edited by: Hugo Grimaldi; Bud Hoffman
- Music by: Richard A. Podolor
- Production company: Gemini-American Productions
- Distributed by: Ellman Enterprises
- Release date: October 21, 1970
- Running time: 84 minutes
- Language: English

Bigfoot is a 1970 independently made American low budget science fiction film, produced by Anthony Cardoza and directed by Robert F. Slatzer. The film stars John Carradine, Chris Mitchum, Joi Lansing, Ken Maynard, Doodles Weaver, and Lindsay Crosby.

This exploitation film attempts to transform the Pacific Northwest Sasquatch man-beast into an old-fashioned movie monster, known as King Kong (as a quote on the original film poster proudly trumpets). A remake using the same title, Bigfoot, was made for and shown on basic cable's SyFy Channel in 2012.

== Plot ==
Fast-talking Jasper B. Hawks drives through the forest in his car, along with his sidekick Elmer Briggs. At the same time, pilot Joi Landis pilots a single engine aircraft over the same area. Joi's engine conks out, and she is forced to parachute to safety. On the ground, she suddenly encounters a Bigfoot creature that emerges from the woods and attacks her.

Laconic biker Rick rolls into the woods with his girlfriend Chris. She stumbles onto a Bigfoot burial ground and is also attacked by a Bigfoot.

A skeptical Sheriff's department and the ranger's station are notified of the women's disappearance, but to no avail; the authorities make a half-hearted search for the missing women and give up. Rick seeks help elsewhere, but only Jasper B. Hawks believes his story, offering aid only because he plans on capturing a Bigfoot for later live exhibition in a freak show financed by an insane professor of biology, Professor Blackthorne.

Meanwhile, Peggy is also attacked and tied up to a tree next to Joi. The Bigfoot creatures, it turns out, are half-human and the offspring of a larger, 12-foot tall male Bigfoot and have only been guarding the women for him. "Dad" Bigfoot finally shows up and fights a big bear menacing the captured women, while they scream in terror.

Jasper, Elmer, and Rick trek through the woods until they reach the Bigfoot lair. "Dad" Bigfoot is gassed by Rick's bikers, and as planned gets put on display in Jasper's previously mentioned freak show. As it turns out, he is able to escape captivity rather quickly, while in the process stepping on local drunk, "Lucky Bob", killing him. "Dad" Bigfoot goes on a rampage through the town before finally returning to his cave. There, he eventually gets blown up by one of Rick's dynamite-wielding bikers.

His freak show prize now lost to him, Jasper paraphrases a line of dialog from the original King Kong (1933): "It was beauty that did him in". With "Dad" Bigfoot now dead, everybody returns to their normal lives.

== Cast ==
- John Carradine as Jasper B. Hawks
- Joi Lansing as Joi Landis
- Judy Jordan as Chris
- John Mitchum as Elmer Briggs
- James Craig as Cyrus
- Christopher Mitchum as Rick
- Joy Wilkerson as Peggy
- Lindsay Crosby as "Wheels"
- Ken Maynard as Mr. Bennett
- Dorothy Keller as Nellie Bennett
- Garrick Hobson as Professor Blackthorne
- Doodles Weaver as Forest Ranger
- James Stellar as Bigfoot: "The Eighth Wonder Of The World"

== Production ==
Portions of Bigfoot were shot in mountain wilderness locations in northern California where some Sasquatch sightings have been reported over the years. Other outdoor scenes were shot at Tehachapi Mountains, California, while other scenes were shot indoors using sets on a sound stage. Bigfoot was a typical example of the low-budget feature films that emerged in the 1970s.

For both Joi Lansing and western star Ken Maynard, Bigfoot marked their final screen roles.

== Reception ==
Film critic Roger Ebert wrote sarcastically in his film review: "The cast alone convinced me. Let me put it as simply as I can: If you have ever wanted to see a movie starring John Carradine, Joi Lansing, Lindsay Crosby, Chris Mitchum, and Ken Maynard, then Big Foot is almost certainly going to be your only chance. Not since Joan Crawford starred in Trog has there been such an opportunity". On his website Fantastic Movie Musings and Ramblings, Dave Sindelar wrote, "It's got more than its share of dull, boring sequences, especially the endless scenes of the bikers tooling around, but I have to admit to finding this one a little irresistible".

Every 70s Movie, a blog which reviews movies of the 70s, noted: “Bigfoot is a truly awful movie, combining a doofus storyline with shoddy production values and terrible acting, but it’s arresting in a fever-dream sort of way … Bigfoot creatures get more screen time here than in virtually any other ‘70s Sasquatch movie, which is not a good thing—prolonged exposure highlights the bad costumes.”

== See also ==
- List of American films of 1970
