= Fred Beir =

American film and television actor (1927–1980)

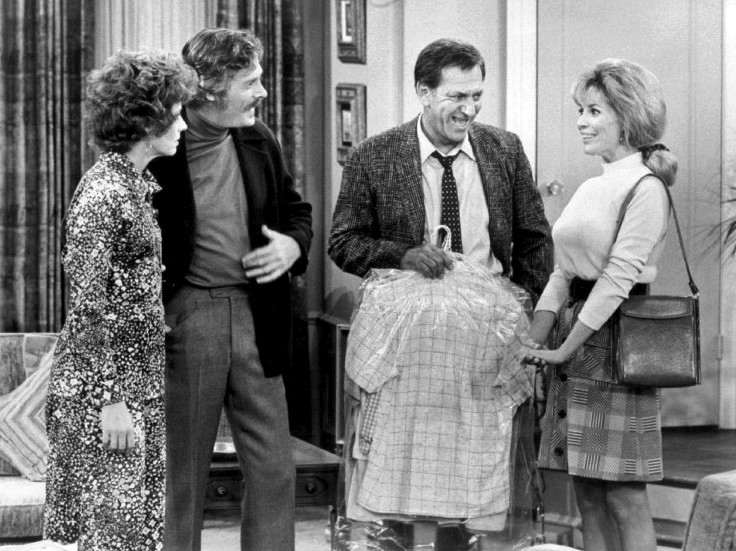
- Beir (second on the left) with Joan Hotchkis, Jack Klugman and Janis Hansen in The Odd Couple, 1971
- Born: Frederick Edwin Beir; September 21, 1927; Niagara Falls, New York, U.S.
- Died: June 3, 1980 (aged 52); Los Angeles, California, U.S.
- Occupations: Film and television actor
- Years active: 1950–1980
- Spouse: Sheilah Wells (m. 1967; div. 1969)

Frederick Edwin Beir (September 21, 1927 – June 3, 1980) was an American film and television actor. He was best known for playing Larry Atwood in the American soap opera television series Days of Our Lives.

== Life and career ==
Beir was born in Niagara Falls, New York. He began his screen career in 1950, appearing in the television series The Philco Television Playhouse. In 1952, he appeared in the television programs Hallmark Hall of Fame and The Web. During his screen career, he appeared in the stage play The Terrible Swift Sword in 1955.

Later in his career, Beir guest-starred in numerous television prgrams The Odd Couple, Kolchak: The Night Stalker, The Andy Griffith Show, Gomer Pyle - U.S.M.C., The Outer Limits, Wagon Train, The Time Tunnel, Mission: Impossible, Mannix, The Six Million Dollar Man, Hawaii Five-O, The Rockford Files, Barnaby Jones, Man From Atlantis, Dallas and The Twilight Zone, He played Larry Atwood in the NBC soap opera television series Days of Our Lives, and played Keith Morrison in the NBC soap opera television series Another World. He also appeared in films such as The Violators, Assassination, Fort Courageous, Three Dollars of Lead, M.M.M. 83 and The Organization.

Beir retired from acting in 1980, last appearing in the CBS drama television series Lou Grant.

== Death ==
Beir died on June 3, 1980, of cancer in Los Angeles, California, at the age of 52. He was buried in Forest Lawn Memorial Park.
