= Train to Tombstone =

1950 film by William A. Berke

- Directed by: William Berke
- Screenplay by: Orville H. Hampton (as Orville Hampton); Victor West
- Story by: Don "Red" Barry (as Don Barry)
- Produced by: William Berke
- Starring: Don "Red" Barry; Robert Lowery; Wally Vernon; Tom Neal; Judith Allen
- Cinematography: Ernest Miller
- Edited by: Carl Pierson
- Production company: Donald Barry Productions
- Distributed by: Lippert Pictures
- Release date: September 16, 1950 (United States)
- Running time: 57 minutes
- Country: United States
- Language: English

Train to Tombstone is a 1950 American Western film directed by William Berke and starring Don "Red" Barry, Robert Lowery, Wally Vernon, Tom Neal and Judith Allen.

== Plot ==
Indians attack a train with an Army agent and gold on board.

== Cast ==
- Don "Red" Barry as Len Howard (as Don Barry)
- Robert Lowery as Marshal Staley
- Wally Vernon as Clifton Gulliver
- Tom Neal as Dr. Willoughby
- Judith Allen as Belle Faith
- Barbara Staley as Doris Clayton
- Minna Phillips as Aunt Abbie
- Nan Leslie as Marie Bell
- Claude Stroud as Deputy Marshall
- Ed Cassidy as George

== See also ==
- List of American films of 1950
