= X-15 (film) =

1961 film by Richard Donner

- Theatrical release poster
- Directed by: Richard D. Donner
- Screenplay by: Tony Lazzarino; James Warner Bellah
- Produced by: Henry Sanicola; Tony Lazzarino
- Starring: David McLean; Charles Bronson; James Gregory; Mary Tyler Moore
- Narrated by: James Stewart (uncredited)
- Cinematography: Carl Guthrie
- Edited by: Stanley Rabjohn
- Music by: Nathan Scott
- Production company: Essex Productions
- Distributed by: United Artists
- Release date: November 21, 1961 (Washington, D.C.)
- Running time: 107 minutes Color (Technicolor)
- Country: United States
- Language: English

X-15 is a 1961 American aviation drama film that presents a fictionalized account of the X-15 research rocket aircraft program, the test pilots who flew the aircraft, and the associated NASA community that supported the program. X-15 starred David McLean, Charles Bronson, (Note: Both James Stewart and Charles Bronson served (separately) with the United States Army Air Forces during World War II; Stewart was a pilot, Bronson was an aerial gunner,) James Gregory and Mary Tyler Moore (in her first feature film role). The film marked the feature film directorial debut of Richard Donner, and was narrated by James Stewart. (Note: Stewart was not only interested in aviation but was also a brigadier general in the United States Air Force Reserve.)

== Plot ==
The experimental North American X-15 program at Edwards Air Force Base involves test pilots: civilian Matt Powell, Lt. Col. Lee Brandon, and Maj. Ernest Wilde. The cutting edge high-speed program is ramrodded by project chief Tom Deparma and US Air Force Col. Craig Brewster. As the test pilots prepare for the planned launch of the rocket-powered aircraft from a Boeing B-52 Stratofortress mother ship, they experience emotional and physical problems, which they share with their wives and sweethearts.

Test after test results in setbacks, including a near disaster when an engine explodes during a ground test and engulfs the X-15 and its pilot in flames, but finally the X-15 begins to set records in speed and altitude for a piloted aircraft. When the X-15 "flames out" on a high altitude run, after guiding the X-15 to a safe landing, saving Powell's life, Lt. Col. Brandon, flying a chase aircraft, is killed in a crash. Powell himself takes the X-15 into outer space for the final test.

== Cast ==
As appearing in screen credits (main roles identified):

- David McLean as NASA Test Pilot Matt Powell
- Charles Bronson as Lieutenant Colonel Lee Brandon
- James Gregory as Tom Deparma
- Mary Tyler Moore as Pamela Stewart
- Ralph Taeger as Major Ernest Wilde
- Brad Dexter as Major Anthony Rinaldi
- Kenneth Tobey as Colonel Craig Brewster
- Patricia Owens as Margaret Brandon
- Lisabeth Hush as Diane Wilde
- Stanley Livingston as Mike Brandon
- Lauren Gilbert as Colonel Jessup
- Phil Dean as Major McCully
- Chuck Stanford as Lieutenant Commander Joe Lacrosse
- Patty McDonald as Susan Brandon
- James Stewart as Himself / narrator (voice) (Note: Broadcasters Ed Fleming and Lee Giroux appear as themselves in a media "scrum" scene.)

== Production ==
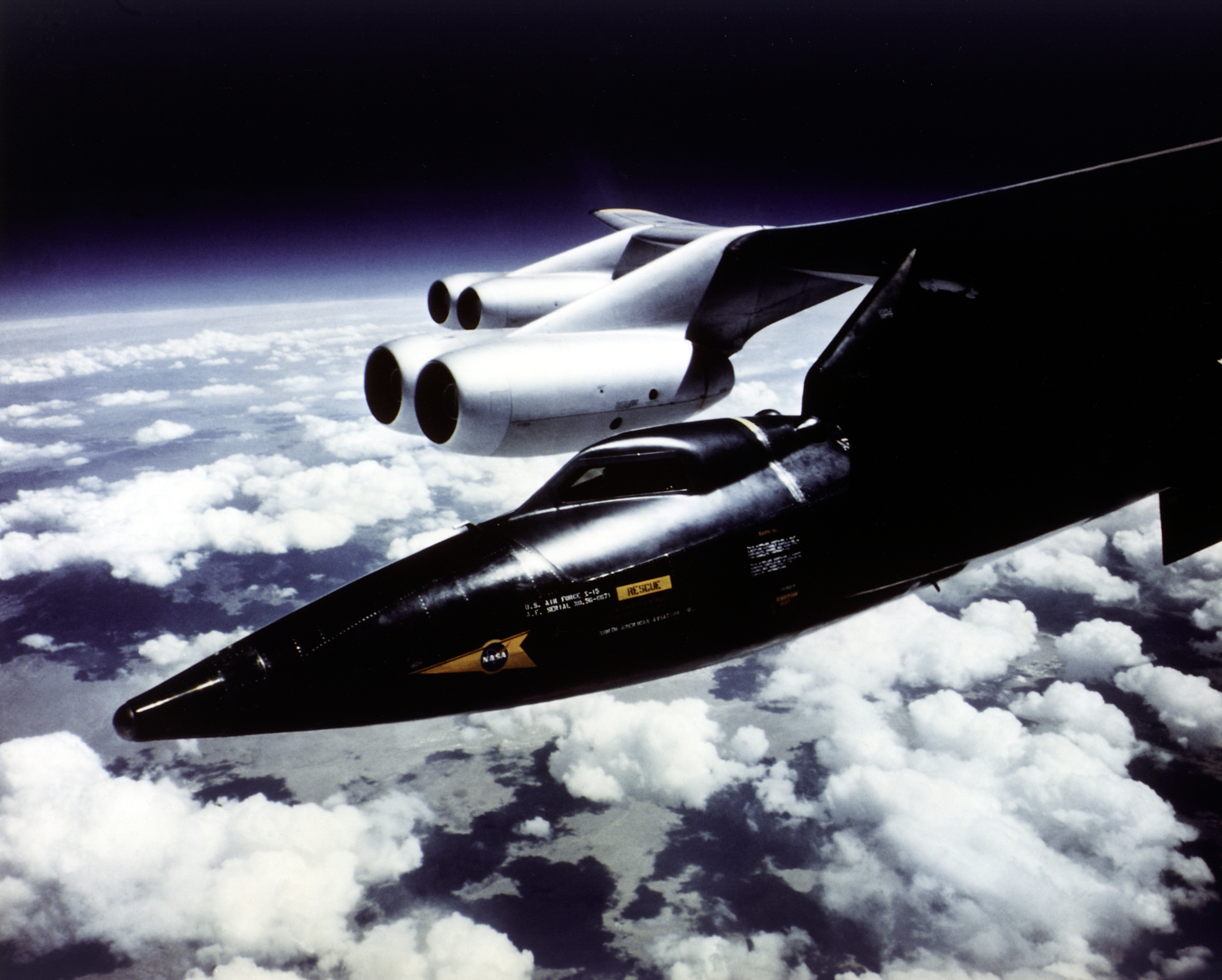
Interweaving of NASA and original film footage was intended to present a realistic representation of the X-15 research flights.

Originally planned around the earlier NASA Bell X-2 program, writer/producer and later screenwriter, Tony Lazzarino shopped the project around Hollywood in 1958, appearing under several titles: Exit, Time of Departure and Beyond the Unknown. Lazzarino was successful in teaming with Bob Hope, who wanted to produce the film. After approaching the USAF for stock footage of the X-2 flights, the Pentagon made a recommendation that the newly introduced X-15 aircraft held out much more promise as a film subject. With $350,000 assigned for primary shooting, with an additional $72,500 for post-production work, by August 1960, pre-production had moved from Hope Enterprises (Hope's film company) to Frank Sinatra’s Essex Productions. After reviewing the initial draft screenplay, Pentagon suggestions clarified that the X-15 test program would be the focus for the upcoming production.

Pentagon assistance was largely responsible for the attention to detail and accurate portrayal of the NASA program. Much of the principal photography for the film was undertaken at Edwards Air Force Base and the NASA High-Speed Flight Station (now the Dryden Flight Research Center) in California, with the direct assistance of NASA, the United States Air Force and North American Aviation. (Note: North American Aviation was the manufacturer of both the X-15 and the F-100s used as NASA chase aircraft.) USAF Capt. Jay Hanks and NASA research pilot Milton Orville Thompson served as technical advisors on the film. Thompson himself later became an X-15 pilot.

The film featured carefully edited NASA footage of X-15 flights intercut with original photography, with a minimum of special effects work using animation. In a pivotal scene of the chase aircraft crashing, X-15 used US Air Force archival footage of the January 10, 1956, "Sabre dance" crash of a North American F-100 Super Sabre flown by Lt. Barty R. Brooks. Another critical scene involved the X-15-3 being destroyed on the test stand when the rocket engine exploded, using stock footage of the accident. (Note: On June 8, 1960, the explosion of the definitive XLR-99 engine ruptured the X-15-3 while pilot Scott Crossfield was on board. The X-15 was eventually repaired and modified to emerge as the X-15A-3.)

A archived letter from NASA Armstrong (then Dryden) to the movie producers, reviewing the script prior to production, had recommended a different scenario for a fatal X-15 accident. It cited maximum risk as beginning reentry from space with the X-15 at an inappropriate orientation. That situation actually occurred several years later on X-15 Flight 3-65-97, November 15, 1967, in the rebuilt X-15-3, when pilot Mike Adams experienced a hypersonic spin on reentry. The result was final destruction of the #3 X-15 and the only X-15 pilot fatality. The probable cause was pilot vertigo while in space.

=== Aircraft used in the production ===
- Boeing NB-52A Stratofortress (carrier/mother ship)
- Lockheed F-104A Starfighter ("Chase 1" | chase aircraft)
- North American X-15 (research aircraft)
- North American F-100F Super Sabre ("Chase 2" | chase aircraft)
- Piasecki H-21 Work Horse ("Rescue NASA 1" | rescue helicopter) (Note: Bell X-1E #46-063, is on display in front of the NASA Dryden Flight Research Center headquarters building.)

== Release ==
=== Home media ===
After its initial successful introduction, X-15 quickly faded from movie screens, and was unable to gain much traction from foreign releases. (Note: In Germany, X-15 was known as Die X-15 startklar (The X-15, ready for takeoff).) Rarely shown on television, with its first airing only in 1979, the film was released briefly in VHS in 1983 and was released on DVD in 2004.

== Reception ==
=== Box office ===
Donner said the film made "a fortune".

=== Critical response ===
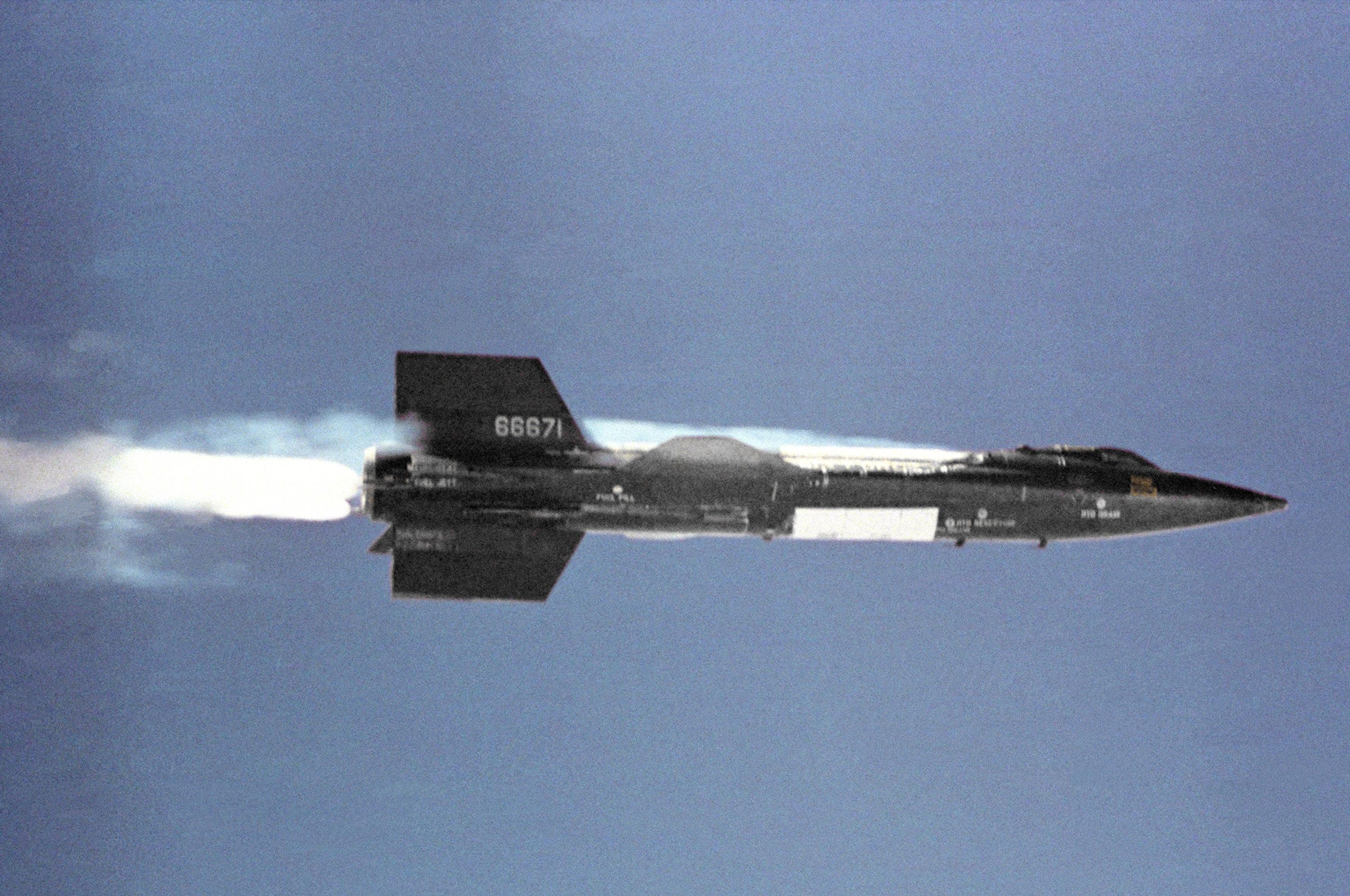
An X-15, the subject of the film, in flight

Released just as the actual rocket aircraft was making headlines in breaking speed and altitude records and reaching the upper edges of the stratosphere, X-15 was critically reviewed, receiving praise for its authenticity. Following its premiere in Washington, D.C., The Washington Evening Star raved, "Whatever its serious scientific intentions, the X-15 is an almost unbelievable screen spectacular." Considered a realistic look at the lives of the X-15 pilots and the efforts to fly into space, the review in The New York Times commented that it was "A surprisingly appealing and sensible low-budget picture—a semi-documentary with some harmless fictional embroidery ..." Most reviews centered on the accurate portrayal of the U.S. space effort, but disparaged the tepid romantic storyline, even suggesting that the film should have been made as a documentary. Despite generally favorable reviews, Variety sounded a cautious note, calling it "a rather dubious prospect. Much too technically involved for the layman—at times, it resembles a training film more than popular entertainment."

In a more recent appraisal of the film, reviewer Glenn Erickson confronted the two critical failings of the film, emphasizing that Donner's direction resulted in an insipid portrait while short-cutting production values also led to an unsatisfying result. Erickson states clearly, "X-15 plays like a bland Air Force Audio Visual Services film that turned into a feature. One of the film's producers was Frank Sinatra, and actor Brad Dexter was at this time sort of a producer wheeler-dealer as well. The film may have started as a government publicity effort, as the idea that the X-15 program is in trouble with the press and Washington is given more attention than anything else in the movie." Even for aviation aficionados, the film is a failure because the production is an "anamorphic movie with an aspect ratio of 2:35. All the original "docu" shots of the real jets and rockets were photographed at the standard narrow 1:37." The jarring back-and-forth between a standard widescreen format and NASA footage that is stretched and distorted relegates the film to a curiosity. In his DVD review, Erickson did not properly express the aspect ratios - where he used "1:37", it should be taken to mean 1.37:1 for example. Only the USAF crash scene footage retains the Panavision anamorphic format, although careful review shows that the aircraft involved is not the chase aircraft.

=== Other response ===
Mary Tyler Moore mentioned the film during an appearance on Lucille Ball's radio talk show, Let's Talk to Lucy. "...I've only really done one picture, and I wouldn't even call that a picture. It was one of those low-budget wonders that was shot in two weeks, and better forgotten altogether. It was a picture called X-15. They weren't quite sure if it was a training film or a melodrama, you know."

== See also ==
- List of American films of 1961
