= Ralph Taeger =

American actor

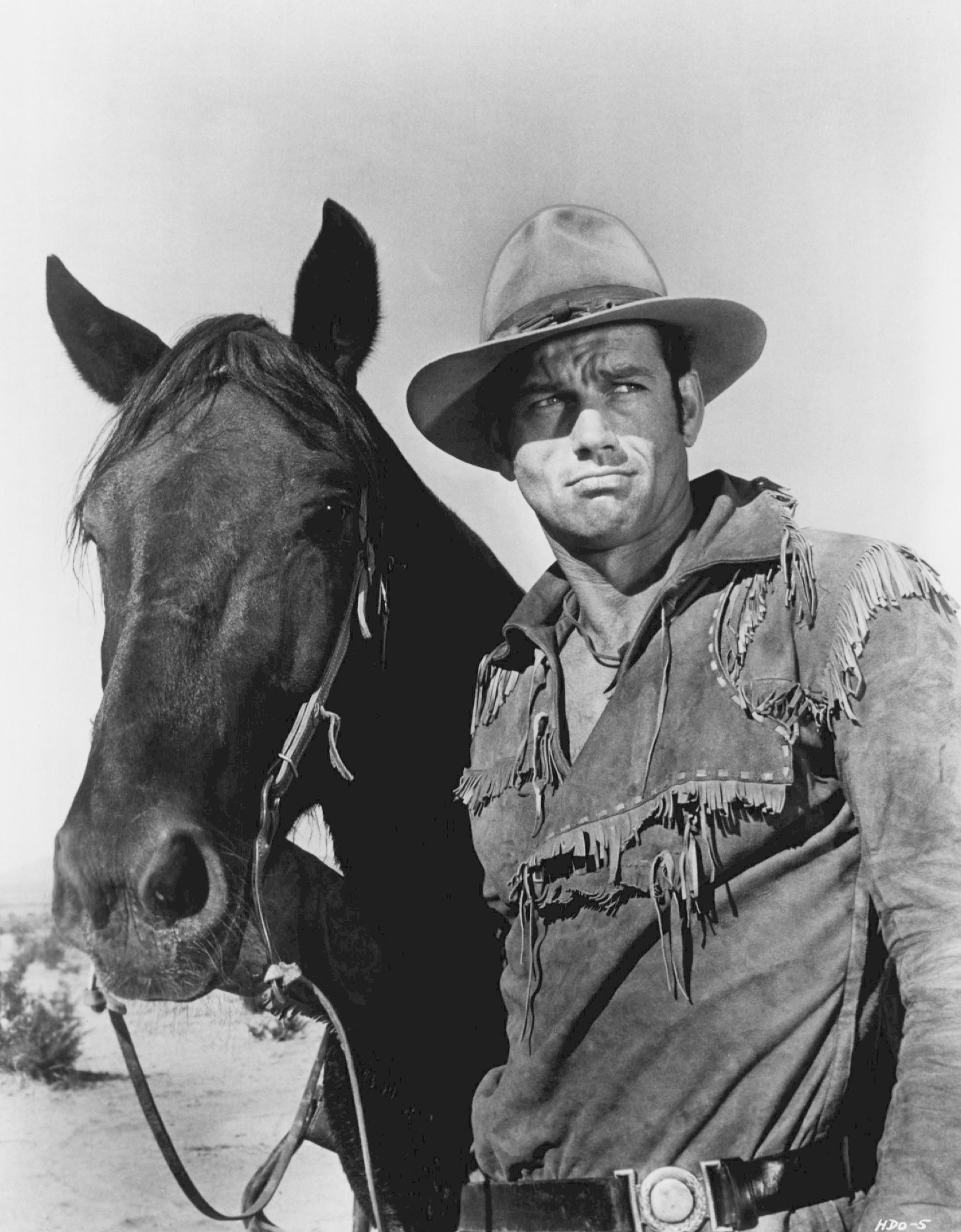
- Taeger as Hondo Lane in Hondo (1967)
- Born: July 30, 1936; Richmond Hill, New York, U.S.
- Died: March 11, 2015 (aged 78); Placerville, California, U.S.
- Education: American Academy of Dramatic Arts
- Occupation: Actor
- Spouse: Linda Jarrett Taeger (1967–2015; his death)
- Children: 1

Ralph Taeger (July 30, 1936 – March 11, 2015) was an American actor who starred in three short-lived television series during the 1960s: Klondike (1960–61), Acapulco (1961) and Hondo (1967–68).

== Biography ==
Ralph Taeger was born in Richmond Hill, Queens, to German-speaking parents. Taeger's first career choice was professional baseball, and he did play briefly on a farm team for the Los Angeles Dodgers. Knee injuries prompted him to switch his focus from athletics to acting, though he referred to baseball as his "first love."

A high school teacher had suggested Taeger try public speaking and acting. In the late 1950s he enrolled at the American Academy of Dramatic Arts in New York City and also worked as a model. Within six months, however, he landed a major role in a production at the Beverly Hills Playhouse. An official at MGM was so impressed by Taeger's performance that the studio signed him to a contract.

=== Acting career ===
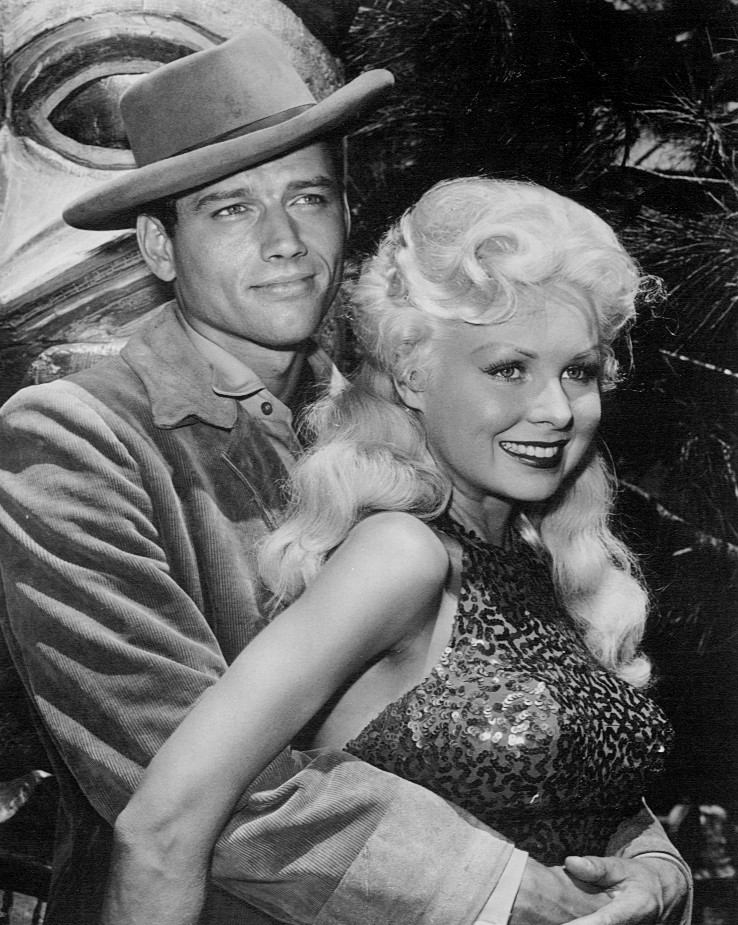
With Joi Lansing in Klondike (1960)

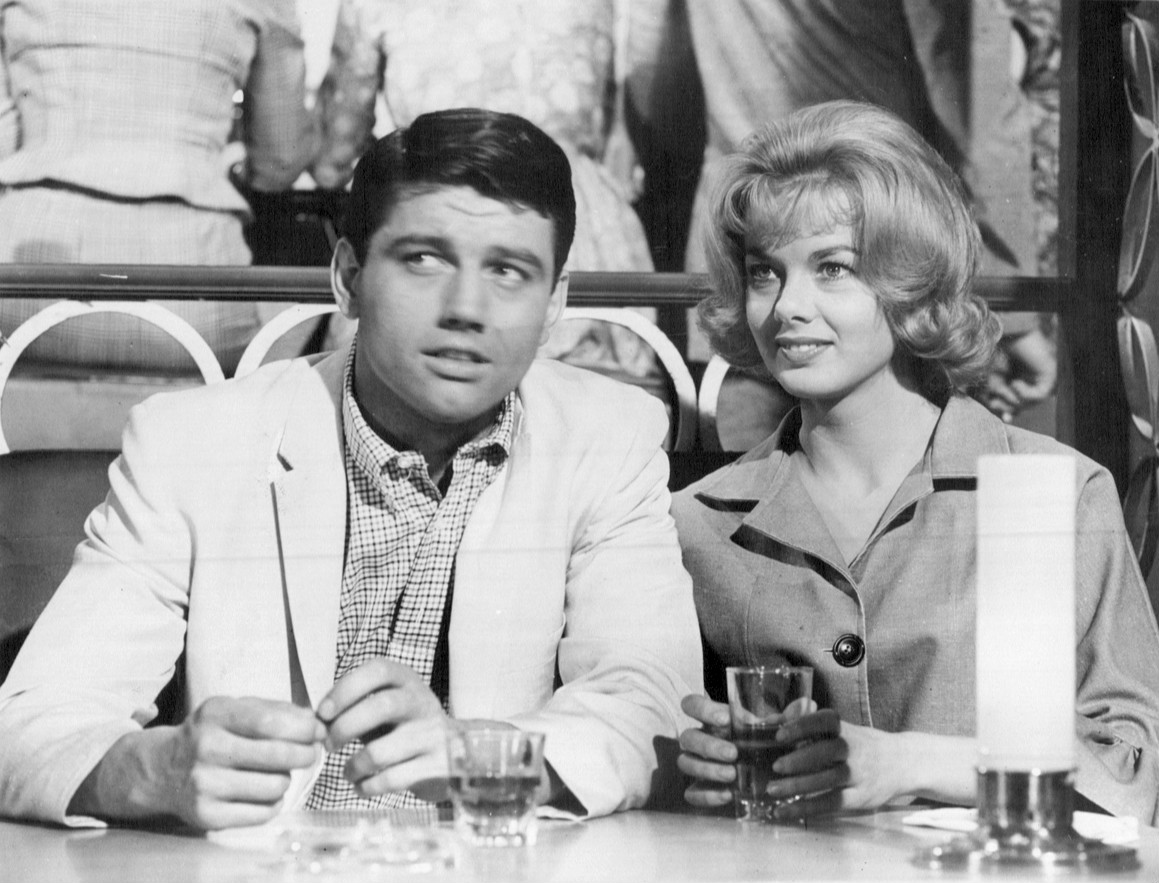
With Leslie Parrish in Acapulco (1961)

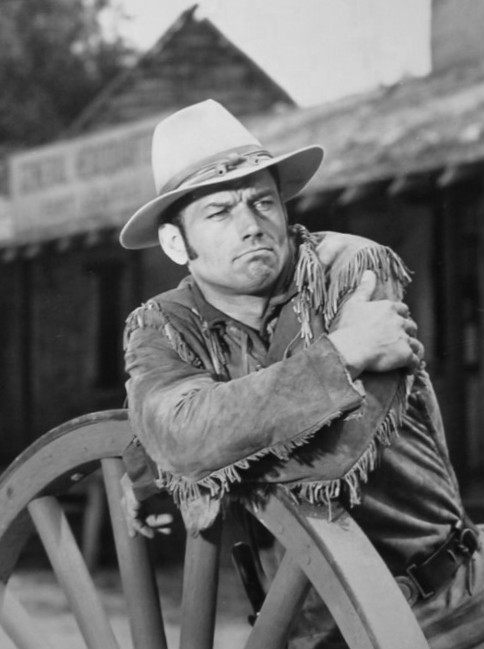
In Hondo (1967)

Early in his acting career, Taeger was cast on episodes of the syndicated series Highway Patrol, starring Broderick Crawford, and Manhunt, starring Victor Jory. His first television series as the lead was Klondike, a half-hour western adventure series set in Skagway, Alaska, during the 1897-1899 gold rush. Taeger played Mike Halliday, a rugged prospector.

Midway through the 1960-1961 season, NBC dropped Klondike but transferred Taeger and co-star James Coburn to the replacement series, Acapulco, set in the Mexican resort. In Acapulco, Taeger played Patrick Malone, a Korean War veteran-turned-beachcomber; both Taeger and Coburn's characters providing the security for a lawyer, played by Telly Savalas. In 1965 he guest starred on The Man from U.N.C.L.E.

In 1967, Taeger was cast in the title role of Hondo, as Hondo Lane, a cavalry scout in the Arizona Territory of the 1870s, based on the 1953 3D theatrical film starring John Wayne and Geraldine Page. Noah Beery Jr. portrayed Hondo's sidekick in the television series. In a 1967 interview Taeger told TV Guide: "For a long time I couldn't get any work because people had hung a label on me as uncooperative. But I'm not; it's just that I say what I think, and sometimes that rubs folks the wrong way." After Hondo, Taeger made only five television appearances, the last in 1983 as Brimmer in "The Rockets' Red Glare" of the Merlin Olsen NBC western series, Father Murphy.

His film appearances were few, but included roles in X-15 (1961), The Carpetbaggers (1964), Stage to Thunder Rock (1964), A House Is Not a Home (1964), The Delta Factor (1970) and The Hostage Heart (1977).

=== Personal life ===
In 1967, Taeger married Linda Jarrett; the couple had one son, Richard. The family operated Taeger's Firewood Company in Placerville, California.

=== Death ===
Taeger died on March 11, 2015, in Placerville, after a long illness.

== Filmography ==
Year	Title	Role	Notes
1959	It Started with a Kiss	Tommy	Uncredited
1960	Sea Hunt	Lee Batten	Episode: "Man Overboard"
1960	Bat Masterson	Frank Dexter	Episode S2E30: "Welcome To Paradise"
1961	X-15	Maj. Ernest Wilde	
1964	The Carpetbaggers	Buzz Dalton	
1964	Stage to Thunder Rock	Reese Sawyer	
1964	A House Is Not a Home	Casey Booth	
1964	Twilight Zone	Walter Holmes	Episode S5E20: "From Agnes With Love"
1970	The Delta Factor	Art Keefer	
1977	The Hostage Heart	Lt. Dawson	

== Sources ==
- Brooks, Tim. (1987). The Complete Directory To Primetime TV Stars. New York: Ballantine Books, p. 827.
- Brooks, Tim & Marsh, Earle. (1979). The Complete Directory To Primetime Network TV Shows. New York: Ballantine Books, pp. 5, 270, 327.
- Lamparski, Richard. (1985). Whatever became of...?, Ninth Series. New York: Crown Publishers Inc., pp. 170–171.
- Prelutsky, Burt. (1967, December 2–8). He Can Always Go Back To Polishing Floors. TV Guide, pp. 32–34.
