= Fred Krone =

American actor and stuntman

Fred Krone (June 19, 1930 – January 12, 2010), also known as Krunch, was an American actor and stuntman who worked predominantly in Westerns.

== Career ==
Krone was born in Kentucky. He began working in the 1950s performing stunts and as an actor. He worked in the early days of Steve McQueen's career and doubled for McQueen in 1960/61 on the TV series Wanted: Dead or Alive, among others.

Krone had appearances on The Range Rider, Yancy Derringer (S1E02 "Gallatin Street"), The Rifleman, The Texan, The Life and Legend of Wyatt Earp, and many more. He made a brief appearance on Perry Mason in 1966 as jewel thief and murder victim Nils Dorow in "The Case of the Tsarina's Tiara." He worked well into the 1970s and appeared on several episodes of Mannix.

== Death ==
Krone died on January 12, 2010, in Santa Paula, California after a long battle with cancer.

== Filmography ==
Year	Title	Role	Notes
1952	The Steel Fist	First Student	
1953	Last of the Pony Riders	Henchman	Uncredited
1956	The Houston Story	Marsh	
1956	The First Texan	Soldier	Uncredited
1956	Reprisal!	Barfly	Uncredited
1958	Man from God's Country	Cowboy	Uncredited
1958	Badman's Country	Gang Member	Uncredited
1958	Apache Territory	Styles	
1962	Hand of Death	Cab Driver	
1962	The Firebrand	Dickens	
1962	Young Guns of Texas	Pike - Glendenning's Foreman	
1964	The Quick Gun	Bonner	Uncredited
1964	Young Fury	Member of The Hellion Gang #4	
1965	War Party	Indian	
1965	Fort Courageous	Soldier	
1965	Convict Stage	Dixon	
1965	Arizona Raiders	Matt Edwards	
1966	Not with My Wife, You Don't!	First Australian	Uncredited
1968	The Love Bug	Driver #34	
1969	Hell's Belles	Buzz	
1969	The Great Bank Robbery	Cowboy	Uncredited
1972	The Limit	Drunk	
1972	The Life and Times of Judge Roy Bean	Outlaw #7	
