= Hughes and Harlow: Angels in Hell =

- Directed by: Larry Buchanan
- Screenplay by: Lynn Shubert; Larry Buchanan
- Produced by: Larry Buchanan
- Starring: Victor Holchak; Lindsay Bloom; Royal Dano; David McLean
- Cinematography: Nickolas Josef von Sternberg
- Edited by: Robert A. Fitzgerald
- Music by: Jimmie Haskell
- Production companies: H & H Films
- Distributed by: PRO International Pictures
- Release date: May 25, 1977
- Running time: 95 minutes
- Country: United States
- Language: English

Hughes and Harlow: Angels in Hell is a 1977 film by director Larry Buchanan. The film is about the relationship between Howard Hughes (played by Victor Holchak) and Jean Harlow (played by Lindsay Bloom).

== Cast ==
- Victor Holchak as Howard Hughes
- Lindsay Bloom as Jean Harlow
- David McLean as Billy
- Charles Aidikoff as Projectionist
- James S. Appleby as Pilot
- Wally K. Berns as Announcer
- James Brodhead as Lawyer
- Don Brodie as Director
- Barry Buchanan as Pilot
- Adele Claire as Mother
- David Clover as George
- Rita Conde as Inez
- Tony Cortez as Emiliano
- Brian Cummings as Assistant Director
- John S. Curran as Chase Cop
