= Hot Cars =

1956 film by Don McDougall

- Theatrical release poster
- Directed by: Don McDougall
- Screenplay by: Don Martin; Richard H. Landau
- Based on: Hot Cars by H. Haile Chace
- Produced by: Howard W. Koch
- Starring: John Bromfield; Carol Shannon; Joi Lansing; Ralph Clanton; Mark Dana; Charles Keane; George Sawaya
- Cinematography: William Margulies
- Edited by: George A. Gittens
- Music by: Les Baxter
- Production companies: Schenck-Koch Productions; Bel-Air Productions
- Distributed by: United Artists
- Release date: November 2, 1956
- Running time: 60 minutes
- Country: United States
- Language: English

Hot Cars is a 1956 American film noir crime film directed by Don McDougall and written by Don Martin and Richard H. Landau. The film stars John Bromfield, Carol Shannon, Joi Lansing, Ralph Clanton, Mark Dana, Charles Keane, and George Sawaya. It was released on November 2, 1956, by United Artists.

== Plot ==
Nick Dunn, a used car salesman, can't close a deal with customers Karen Winter and Arthur Markel, so he is fired. A sympathetic Markel has a car lot of his own and offers a job to Nick, who quits after discovering Markel's disreputable business: Markel obviously sells stolen cars.

Nick and wife Jane have a financial dilemma when their baby son falls ill. Swallowing his pride, Nick asks for his job back with Markel, who promotes him to manager. But the criminal activity continues. Detective Davenport, on the trail of the racket, tries to get hand at a hot car. Last minute the lot's boss, Smiley Ward, shows up under a false name and cancels the purchase, claiming the car was already sold to him. Returning shortly after, Davenport warns Dunn to stay at his job. The detective leaves and is murdered by Ward, who shadowed him.

Jane is appalled by Nick's new line of work. Conspicuous account movements aroused her suspicion, resulting in an argument. Dunn seeks solace in the company of the beautiful Karen, Markel's assistant. A while before, he had some drinks with her at Jack's bar. But when the cops come to investigate Davenport's death, Karen refuses to give Nick an alibi. Now a - framed - murder suspect, he escapes. At the gang's car forging shop, he is abducted by Ward, who threatens to murder him too. On the parking lot at Jack's bar, a fight between the two ensues. Ward flees to the nearby amusement park, entering a roller coaster. Dunn, who pursued him, joins, the fistfight between the two results in Ward being thrown off, falling to his death. Nick tries to explain the hot-car racket to the police, implicating Karen and Markel.

== Cast ==
- John Bromfield as Nick Dunn
- Carol Shannon as Jane Dunn
- Joi Lansing as Karen Winter
- Ralph Clanton as Arthur Markel
- Mark Dana as Smiley Ward
- Charles Keane as Lieutenant Jefferson
- George Sawaya as Lt. Fred Holmes
- Dabbs Greer as Detective Davenport
- John Frederick as Hutton
- Kurt Katch as Otto
- Joan Sinclair as Miss Rogers
- Robert Osterloh as 'Big John' Hayman
- Maurice Marks as Paul the Bartender
- Paula Hill as Mrs. Davenport
