= David McLean (actor) =

American film and television actor

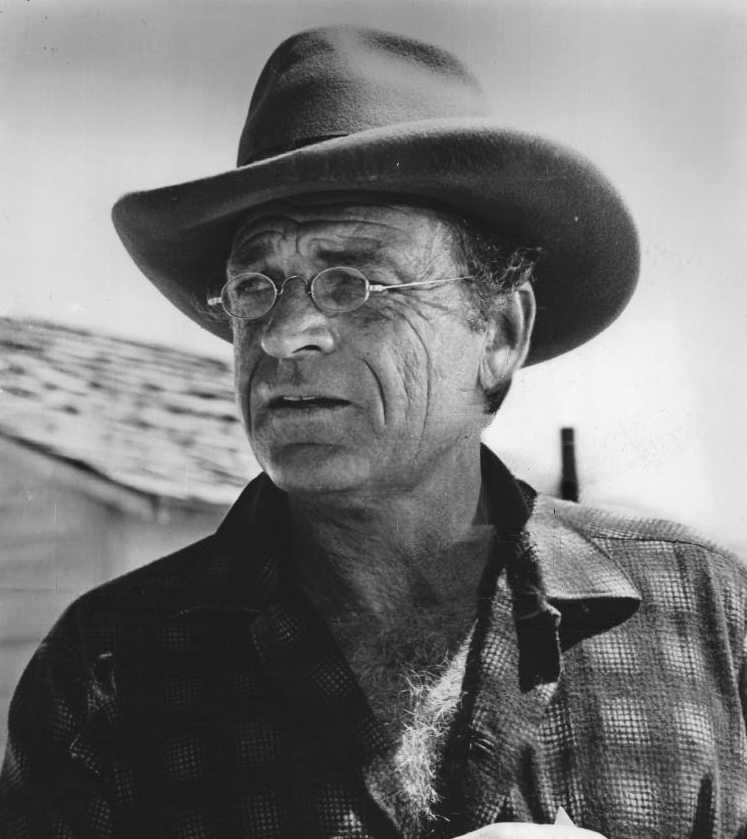
- McLean in Death Valley Days, 1969
- Born: Eugene Joseph Huth; May 19, 1922; Akron, Ohio. U.S.
- Died: October 12, 1995 (aged 73); Culver City, California, U.S.
- Resting place: Holy Cross Cemetery, Culver City, California
- Occupation: Actor
- Years active: 1955–1978
- Spouse: Lilo Diane Haig
- Children: 1

David McLean (May 19, 1922 – October 12, 1995) was an American film and television actor, best known for appearing in many Marlboro television and print advertisements beginning in the early 1960s.

== Early years ==
McLean was born as Eugene Joseph Huth in Akron, Ohio.

== Career ==
McLean's acting career began on stage with work in little theater plays. Following military service in World War II, he acted in productions in Los Angeles in addition to drawing sketches and cartoons.

In addition to his commercial work for Marlboro cigarettes, McLean starred as the title character in the NBC Western television series, Tate, which was a summer replacement for half of Perry Como's program in 1960. He also appeared in numerous television programs and feature films of the 1960s and '70s, including a leading role in the 1961 movie X-15, the directorial debut of Richard Donner, and films such as The Strangler (1964), Nevada Smith (1966), Hughes and Harlow: Angels in Hell (1977), Kingdom of the Spiders (1977), and Deathsport (1978).

He guest-starred three times in the NBC television series Laramie, in the 1962 episodes "Beyond Justice", in the role of Steve Collier, a corrupt territorial politician; in "A Grave For Cully Brown" as Cully Brown; and as Marshal Branch McGary in the 1963 episode, "The Marshals". In 1966, he appeared in an episode of the NBC Western The Virginian. He guest-starred in the NBC Western series Bonanza and on Daniel Boone.

In 1963, McLean was cast as the gangster Frank MacErlane in the episode "Open Season" of the CBS anthology series, GE True, hosted by Jack Webb. In the story line, James Best portrays the courageous Wisconsin game warden Ernie Swift, who faces the reprisal of the mob after he tickets MacErlane for illegal fishing. That year, he also appeared on Perry Mason as the title character and defendant Trevor Harris in "The Case of the Lawful Lazarus". As Lazarus in the Bible had been raised by Jesus from the dead, Harris reappeared from a 10-year absence after being declared legally dead.

McLean appeared as Stephen F. Austin in the 1964 episode, "A Book of Spanish Grammar", on the anthology series, Death Valley Days. In the story line, Austin travels to Mexico City to purchase land in colonial Texas to sell to future settlers. His traveling companion, Valdez (Rodolfo Acosta), wonders why he risks so much to help strangers.

Aside from his commercial appearances for Marlboro, McLean was the spokesperson for Great Western Savings and Loan in its television commercials. He was also an woodworker and artist.

== Personal life ==
McLean was married to Lilo Diane Haig, who is also known as Liselotte Herlinger. They had a son, Mark.

== Health problems ==
A lifelong smoker, McLean started suffering in 1985 from emphysema and had a tumor removed from a lung in 1994. His libertarian bent prevented him from pursuing a direct suit against Philip Morris, but he did become an antismoking advocate. At a meeting of stockholders of Philip Morris, the manufacturer of Marlboro, McLean requested that the company limit its advertising.

McLean was one of two Marlboro Man actors to suffer from cancer. Wayne McLaren, who acted the part for print advertising, died of lung cancer in 1992.

== Death ==
On October 12, 1995, McLean died of lung cancer at the age of 73 in Los Angeles, California. His burial was at Holy Cross Cemetery in Culver City, California.

== Posthumous ==
"In 1996, McLean's widow and son filed suit for wrongful death against Philip Morris ... [claiming] that the firm encouraged or even required cigarette smoking, which caused McLean's lung cancer." A fictitious version of these purported events was featured in the comic novel Thank You for Smoking.

The suit was eventually dismissed. A January 27, 2014, article in the Los Angeles Times reported that "a federal judge ruled that California law -- in those days, more protective of tobacco companies -- protected Phillip Morris from Lilo McLean's claims. McLean was billed for the costs of the lawsuit."

== Filmography ==
Year	Title	Role	Notes
1960	Tate	Tate	13 episodes
1961	The Right Approach	Bill Sikulovic	
1961	The Silent Call	Joe Brancato	
1961	Voyage to the Bottom of the Sea	Ned Thompson	Uncredited
1961	X-15	Matt Powell	
1964	The Strangler	Lt. Frank Benson	
1966	Nevada Smith	Romero	
1971	The Andromeda Strain	Senator McKenzie (New Mexico)	Uncredited
1977	Hughes and Harlow: Angels in Hell	Billy	
1977	Kingdom of the Spiders	Gene Smith	
1978	Deathsport	Lord Zirpola	(final film role)
