= Acapulco (1961 TV series) =

1961 TV series

- Genre: Adventure
- Written by: B.C. Schoenfeld; Cy Chermak; Gene L. Coon
- Starring: Ralph Taeger; James Coburn; Telly Savalas
- Theme music composer: Billy May
- Country of origin: United States
- Original language: English
- No. of seasons: 1
- No. of episodes: 8

Production
- Producer: John Robinson
- Running time: 30 minutes
- Production company: Ziv Television Programs

Original release
- Network: NBC
- Release: February 27 – April 24, 1961

Related
- Klondike

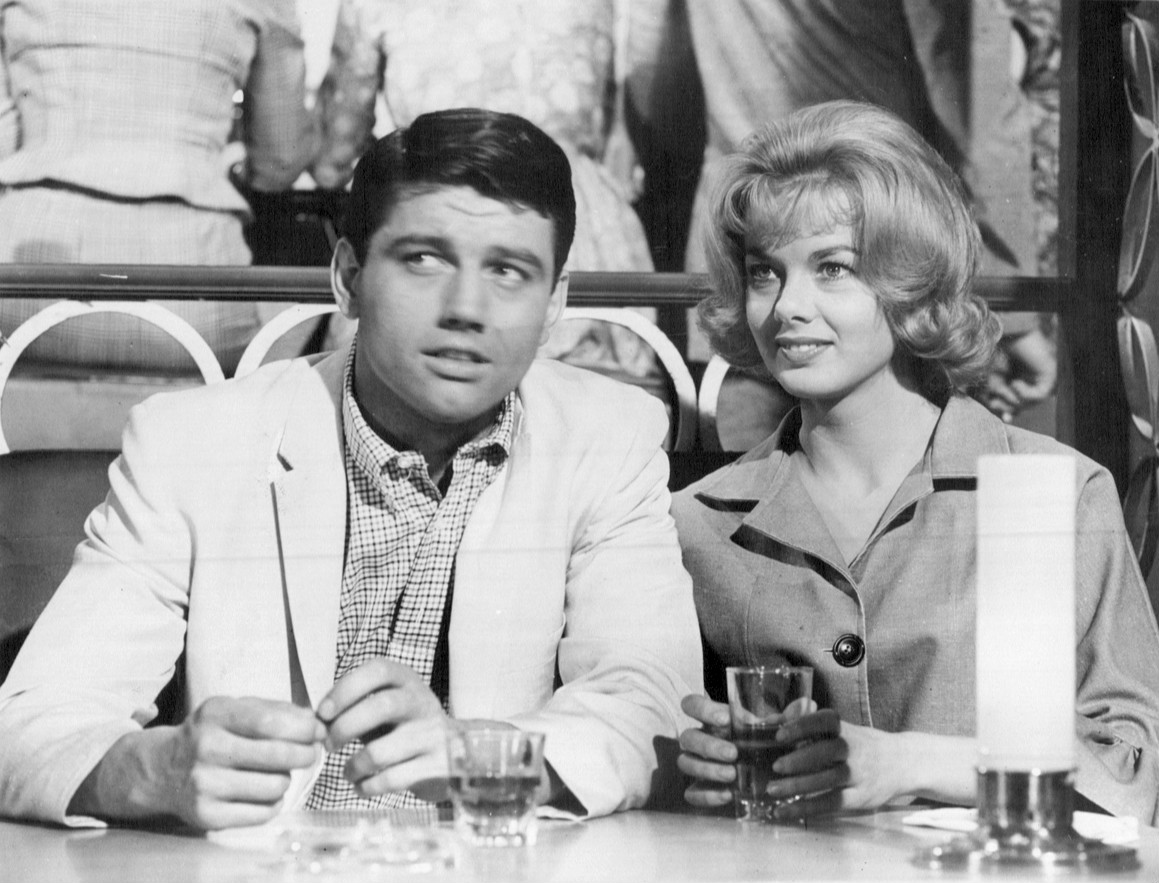
Ralph Taeger and guest star Leslie Parrish in the episode "Fisher's Daughter."

Acapulco is an American half-hour adventure series starring Ralph Taeger and James Coburn that aired on NBC in 1961. It is notable for providing Telly Savalas with his first regularly recurring role in a television series.

== Synopsis ==
Patrick Malone and Gregg Miles are Korean War veterans who, tired of life in the United States, have taken up residence in Acapulco, Mexico, as beachcombers. They also help people in distress and often work for Mr. Carver, protecting him from enemies he made during his career as a criminal lawyer.

== Cast ==
- Ralph Taeger as Patrick Malone
- James Coburn as Gregg Miles
- Telly Savalas as Mr. Carver
- Bobby Troup as Himself
- Allison Hayes as Chloe
- Jason Robards, Sr. as Max

== Production ==
Taeger and Coburn were starring in Klondike, another Ziv Television/NBC series, when it was cancelled after 17 episodes, its last episode airing on February 13, 1961. In order to fulfill Ziv's contract with NBC, they were recast in Acapulco, which premiered two weeks later in the same time slot as Klondike.

The show′s setting in the fashionable resort city of Acapulco allowed its producers to arrange for celebrities such as Julie London, Broderick Crawford, and Gene Barry to make surprise cameo appearances in each episode. The celebrities appeared as themselves enjoying a visit to Acapulco rather than as guest stars playing a character involved in the episode′s plot.

== Broadcast history ==
Acapulco premiered on February 27, 1961, and was broadcast on Mondays at 9:00 p.m. Eastern Time throughout its brief run. It lasted for only eight episodes, and its last episode aired on April 24, 1961.

== Episodes ==
No.	Title	Directed by	Written by	Original release date
1	"Bell's Half Acre"	John Meredyth Lucas	Cy Chermak	February 27, 1961
After Carver hires Pat and Gregg to apprehend robbery suspect Norman Median, Chloe and Bobby help them find a clue about his whereabouts — but when they find Median, they are maneuvered into hiding him.
2	"Killer in a Rose-Colored Mask"	Unknown	John Robinson	March 6, 1961
When Pat and Gregg visit Carver, he talks them into helping him thwart an expected attempt on his life — and Pat invites a pretty woman named Kathy Dorn to a party at Carver's mansion.
3	"The Gentleman From Brazil"	Unknown	Gene L. Coon	March 13, 1961
After Carver's representative in Brazil is murdered and a messenger bringing papers to Carver from Brazil disappears, Carver cuts off Pat's and Gregg's credit to force them to find the messenger for him. Guest star: Alan Hale, Jr.
4	"Carbon Copy-Cat"	Unknown	Cy Chermak	March 20, 1961
Pat and Gregg are kidnapped after they buy a rare pre-Columbian burial urn for a client.
6 (Note: Episodes 5 and 6 were broadcast out of sequence.)	"Fisher's Daughter"	Unknown	Bernard C. Schoenfeld	March 27, 1961
A man named Joe Nichols arrives in Acapulco intending to blackmail his ex-wife — a woman to whom he was married for only a few weeks when she was very young. Guest star: Leslie Parrish
5	"Death Is a Smiling Man"	Unknown	Gene L. Coon	April 3, 1961
A lawyer is murdered just as he is about to leave Acapulco to for a trip to Washington, D.C., to appear before a United States Senate committee to defend his client — a former bookkeeper for mobsters.
7	"Blood Money"	William Conrad	William Bast	April 17, 1961
A pretty woman named Mona Jamison and her invalid brother George arrive in Acapulco after stealing $250,000 in the burglary of a London brokerage firm and shooting their accomplice to death — and Pat learns the hard way that they are guilty of theft and murder.
8	"Murder With Love"	Unknown	Arthur Dales	April 24, 1961
A former attorney from New York City hires Pat and Gregg to prevent his former girlfriend, Barbara Meston, from writing her memoirs.

== DVD rights ==
MGM Home Video owns the DVD rights to Acapulco, but no DVD has been released.
