= War Party (1965 film) =

1965 film by Lesley Selander

- Theatrical release poster
- Directed by: Lesley Selander
- Screenplay by: William Marks; George Williams
- Produced by: Hal Klein
- Starring: Michael T. Mikler; Davey Davison; Don "Red" Barry; Laurie Mock; Dennis Robertson; Charles Horvath
- Cinematography: Gordon Avil
- Edited by: John F. Schreyer
- Music by: Richard LaSalle
- Production company: 20th Century Fox
- Distributed by: 20th Century Fox
- Release date: March 1, 1965
- Running time: 73 minutes
- Country: United States
- Language: English

War Party is a 1965 American Western film directed by Lesley Selander, written by William Marks and George Williams, and starring Michael T. Mikler, Davey Davison, Don "Red" Barry, Laurie Mock, Dennis Robertson and Charles Horvath. It was released on March 1, 1965, by 20th Century Fox.

== Cast ==
- Michael T. Mikler as Johnny Hawk
- Davey Davison as Sarah Lundeen
- Don "Red" Barry as Sgt. Chaney
- Laurie Mock as Nicoma
- Dennis Robertson as Trooper
- Charles Horvath as Wolf Hound
- Guy Wilkerson as Wooden Face
- Michael Carr as Trooper
- Fred Krone as Indian

== See also ==
- List of American films of 1965
