= Stage to Thunder Rock =

1964 American Western film

- Theatrical release poster
- Directed by: William F. Claxton
- Written by: Charles A. Wallace
- Produced by: A. C. Lyles
- Starring: Barry Sullivan; Marilyn Maxwell; Scott Brady; Lon Chaney Jr. Anne Seymour; John Agar; Wanda Hendrix
- Cinematography: W. Wallace Kelley
- Edited by: Jodie Copelan
- Music by: Paul Dunlap
- Production company: A.C. Lyles Productions
- Distributed by: Paramount Pictures
- Release date: November 10, 1964
- Running time: 82 minutes
- Country: United States
- Language: English

Stage to Thunder Rock is a 1964 American Western film directed by William F. Claxton, written by Charles A. Wallace, and featuring Barry Sullivan, Marilyn Maxwell, Scott Brady, Lon Chaney Jr., Keenan Wynn, Anne Seymour, John Agar, Wanda Hendrix and Ralph Taeger. The picture was released on November 10, 1964, by Paramount Pictures.

== Plot ==
In his last act before retirement, Horne, a western sheriff, tracks down the Sawyer brothers, who have robbed a bank of $50,000. He kills one and apprehends the other. Ross Sawyer, a wanted outlaw and father of the boys, intends to intercept the stagecoach before Horne can bring his son Reese to justice.

Leah Parker returns to her family, who run the stagecoach depot. The Parkers are in dire need of money and hope Leah can help, although her reputation as a lady is in question. Without her daughter's knowledge, Myra Parker accepts a bribe to help the Sawyers defeat the sheriff.

Also in need of money to help his blind daughter, Sam Swope is deputized by the town and goes after Ross Sawyer, but is shot. Horne shoots it out with Ross and prevails, then turns in his badge and plans to settle down with Leah.

== Cast ==
- Barry Sullivan as Sheriff Horne
- Marilyn Maxwell as Leah Parker
- Scott Brady as Sam Swope
- Lon Chaney Jr. as Henry Parker
- Anne Seymour as Myra Parker
- John Agar as Dan Carrouthers
- Wanda Hendrix as Mrs. Sarah Swope
- Ralph Taeger as Reese Sawyer
- Keenan Wynn as Ross Sawyer
- Allan Jones as Mayor Ted Dollar
- Laurel Goodwin as Julie Parker
- Robert Strauss as Bob Acres
- Robert Lowery as Deputy Sheriff Seth Barrington
- Rex Bell Jr. as 'Shotgun' Rex
- Argentina Brunetti as Sarita
- Morgan Brittany as Sandy (credited as Suzanne Cupito)
- Paul E. Burns as Joe Withers
- Wayne Peters as Toby Sawyer
- Roy Jenson as Harkins

== See also ==
- List of American films of 1964
