= Hanna Hertelendy =

American actress

- Born: Ilona Zimka; 5 October 1919; Budapest, Hungary
- Died: 15 May 2008 (aged 88); West Hollywood, California, U.S.
- Years active: 1944–2000
- Spouses: István Hertelendy (m. 1940; died 1945) Ernest Valentine Polutnik (m. 1947; div. 1949) William Kerwin (m. 1953; div. 1958) Stephen Bekassy (m. 1960)
- Children: Barbara Kerwin (b. 1954)

Hanna Hertelendy (born Ilona Zimka; October 5, 1919 – May 15, 2008), also known as Hanna Landy, was a Hungarian-American film and television actress.

== Early years ==
She was born as Ilona Zimka' near Budapest. She married István Hertelendy in 1940. She became a successful stage actress with the Hungarian Repertory Theatre Vígszínház in Budapest, playing such roles as Ophelia in Hamletand Irina in Chekhov's Three Sisters), and in Molnár's Liliom and J.B. Priestley's An Inspector Calls.

She came to New York City, and in 1947, became a lifelong member of the Actors Studio.

== Career ==
She continued to act on television in such series as Peter Gunn, Perry Mason, Ironside, Barnaby Jones, Marcus Welby, M.D., The Fugitive, Dr. Kildare, Columbo, T.J. Hooker and Wonder Woman. Among her television roles was as Helga Dolwig in the 1965 Perry Mason episode, "The Case of the Impetuous Imp" and as Nazi villainess Lena Greenberg on Magnum, P.I.. Notable films in which she appeared include Five Minutes to Live (1961), Harlow (1965), Convict Stage (1965), In Like Flint (1967), Rosemary's Baby (1968), The Girl from Petrovka (1974), Two-Minute Warning (1976), Raid on Entebbe (1977), Being There (1979), Christmas Lilies of the Field (1979), and Circle of Power (1981). Others included independent films such as Return (1985).

== Affiliations ==
She was active for more than 40 years with the Academy of Motion Picture Arts and Sciences and the North Hollywood-based Theater West.

== Family ==
Hertelendy was the third and last wife of film star Robert Walker, whom she married on July 27, 1949. Walker died at the age of 32 in 1951, reportedly due to an allergic reaction to a drug administered by his psychiatrist. Hertelendy was married five times; her last husband was Hungarian-American actor Stephen Bekassy. She had one child, from her marriage to William Kerwin, to whom she was married from 1953 until their 1958 divorce.

== Death ==
She died in her West Hollywood, California home on May 15, 2008, aged 88.

== Selected filmography ==
- Strange Roads (1944)
- It Happened in Budapest (1944) – Katinka
- After the Storm (1945) – Piri
- Without Lies (1946)
- Mr. Walkie Talkie (1952) – Jane Winters
- The Leather Saint (1956) – Eva (uncredited)
- Affair in Reno (1957) – Lizzie Kendall (uncredited)
- Diamond Safari (1958) – Wanda
- Legion of the Doomed (1958) – Woman on street
- The Decks Ran Red (1958) – Doris Belger
- Ask Any Girl (1959) – Young Lady (uncredited)
- Man on a String (1960) – Bess Harris
- Operation Eichmann (1961) – Frau Tessa Hess
- Breakfast at Tiffany's (1961) – Party Guest (uncredited)
- Back Street (1961) – Nightclub Patron (uncredited)
- The Explosive Generation (1961) – Mrs. Carlyle (uncredited)
- Five Minutes to Live (1961) – Carol
- The Interns (1962) – Mrs. Richter (uncredited)
- Married Too Young (1962) – Mrs. Simmons (uncredited)
- The New Interns (1964) – Admitting Clerk (uncredited)
- Fort Courageous (1965) – The Mother
- Harlow (1965) – Beatrice Landau
- Git! (1965) – Mrs. Finney
- Convict Stage (1965) – Mrs. Gregory
- In Like Flint (1967) – Helena
- Rosemary's Baby (1968) – Grace Cardiff
- Adam at 6 A.M. (1970) – (uncredited)
- The Jesus Trip (1971) – Sister Charlotte
- Thirty Dangerous Seconds (1972)
- I Love You... Good-bye (1974) – Emily Kimoto
- The Girl from Petrovka (1974) – Judge
- Murph the Surf (1975) – Arlene Dixon (uncredited)
- Gus (1976) – Mama Petrovic
- Two-Minute Warning (1976) – Couple at S.W.A.T. Call
- Raid on Entebbe (1976) – Mrs. Gordon
- Dark Echoes (1977) – Frau Ziemler
- Being There (1979) – Natasha Skrapinov
- Monster (1980) – Mrs. Byrd (uncredited)
- Circle of Power (1981) – Sylvia Arnold
- Micki & Maude (1984) – Admissions Clerk
- Return (1985) – Elizabeth Holt (uncredited)
- Hard Time Romance (1991)
- Ring of Steel (1994) – Dorothy Bennett (uncredited)
- Entourage (2000) – Mrs. Hyder (final film role)
