= Victor Holchak =

American film and television actor

- Holchak in The Hardy Boys/Nancy Drew Mysteries, 1977
- Born: Victor Alvin Holchak Jr. August 10, 1940; Los Angeles, California, U.S.
- Died: September 5, 2014 (aged 74); West Hollywood, California, U.S.
- Education: Los Angeles City College; Royal Academy of Dramatic Art
- Occupations: Film and television actor
- Spouse: Leslie Easterbrook (m. 1979; div. 1988)

Victor Alvin Holchak Jr. (August 10, 1940 – September 5, 2014) was an American film and television actor. He was best known for playing attorney Jim Phillips in the American soap opera television series Days of Our Lives.

== Life and career ==
Holchak was born in Los Angeles, California, the son of Victor Holchak Sr. and Norma Jean Philen. He attended Manual Arts High School, graduating in 1958. After graduating, he attended Los Angeles City College. He also attended the Royal Academy of Dramatic Art in London, studying acting and theatre. He originally worked as a journalist for the Summer Olympic Games, and he began his screen career in 1965, appearing in the television film Romeo and Juliet. In 1970, he appeared in the CBS western television series Gunsmoke.

Later in his career, from 1971 to 1976, Holchak played attorney Jim Phillips in the NBC soap opera television series Days of Our Lives. He guest-starred in television programs including Barnaby Jones, Laverne & Shirley, Cannon, The Hardy Boys/Nancy Drew Mysteries, Police Woman and CHiPs. In 1977, he starred as Howard Hughes in the film Hughes and Harlow: Angels in Hell.

Holchak retired from acting in 1982, last appearing in the NBC adventure drama television series Gavilan.

== Death ==
Holchak died on September 5, 2014, at his home in West Hollywood, California, at the age of 74.
