= Joi Lansing =

American actress (1929–1972)

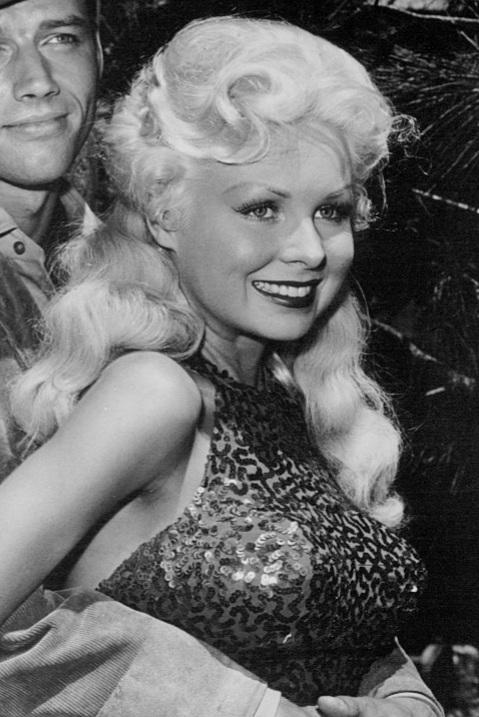
- Lansing with Ralph Taeger in Klondike (1960)
- Born: Joy Rae Brown; April 6, 1929; Salt Lake City, Utah, U.S.
- Died: August 7, 1972 (aged 43); Santa Monica, California, U.S.
- Resting place: Santa Paula Cemetery
- Other names: Joyce Wassmansdorff; Joy Loveland; Joyce Loveland
- Occupations: Model; actress; singer
- Years active: 1942–1970
- Spouses: Jerome "Jerry" Safron (m. 1950; ann. 1950) Lance Fuller (m. 1951; div. 1953) Stan Todd (m. 1960)

Joi Lansing (born Joy Rae Brown; April 6, 1929 – August 7, 1972) was an American model, film and television actress, and nightclub singer. She was noted for her pin-up photos and roles in B-movies, as well as a prominent role in the famous opening "tracking shot" in Orson Welles' 1958 crime drama Touch of Evil.

Lansing was often cast in roles similar to those played by her contemporaries Jayne Mansfield and Mamie Van Doren. She frequently was clad in skimpy costumes and bikinis that accentuated her figure (34D bust), but she never posed nude.

== Early life ==
Lansing was born at Salt Lake Regional Medical Center in Salt Lake City, Utah, in 1929 to Jack Glen Brown (also known as Glen Jack Brown and Glenn Jack Brown), a shoe salesman and orchestra musician, and Virginia Grace (née Shupe) Brown, a housewife.

She was later known by her stepfathers' surnames, i.e. Wassmansdorff and Loveland. In 1940, her family moved to Los Angeles, where her siblings were born.

== Career ==
She began modeling at the age of 14. Lansing was discovered at age 14 by Arthur Freed, the producer, and was signed to an MGM talent school contract. Lansing completed high school on the studio lot. While she was a student at the University of California, Los Angeles, a writer for The Bob Cummings Show spotted her, and a part was written into the show for her.

=== Films ===
Lansing's film career began in 1947, and in 1952 she played an uncredited role in MGM's Singin' in the Rain. She received top billing in Hot Cars (1956), a crime drama involving a stolen-car racket. In 1958, she appeared in the famous opening sequence of Orson Welles's Touch of Evil as Zita, the dancer who dies in a car explosion at the end of the extended tracking shot after exclaiming to a border guard "I keep hearing this ticking noise inside my head!"

She had a brief role as an astronaut's girlfriend in sci-fi parody Queen of Outer Space (1958) and had fourth billing in the science fiction feature The Atomic Submarine (1959).

Lansing appeared in Frank Sinatra's comedy A Hole in the Head (1959), and in Dean Martin's comedy Who Was That Lady? (1960). She played "Lola" in the romantic comedy Marriage on the Rocks (1965), with a cast that included Sinatra, Martin, and Deborah Kerr. Lansing turned down the chance to replace Jayne Mansfield in The Ice House (a 1969 horror film), and instead appeared opposite Basil Rathbone (in his last film appearance) and John Carradine in Hillbillys in a Haunted House (1967), as Mamie Van Doren's replacement. Her last film was Bigfoot (1970).

=== Recordings ===
Lansing started singing in nightclubs in the early 1960s, as documented in several trade magazines. She performed with the Xavier Cugat orchestra and briefly toured with Les Paul, but little is known about the songs she actually recorded. Apparently, while starring on The Bob Cummings Show, she recorded a 45 r.p.m. single on the small REO record label in 1957: "Love Me/What's It Gonna Be" (REO #1007).

In 1962, she recorded six to eight sides at Que Recorders in Los Angeles. These turned up at auction and were acetates of four songs each (with two songs duplicated on the second acetate). It is unknown whether these tracks were released on an album. Both acetates list the same identifying number of #4-8351. The songs recorded on February 23, 1962, were "Masquerade is Over", "All of You" (Cole Porter), "The One I Love" (which was most likely "The One I Love (Belongs to Somebody Else)", and "Who Cares?" (George and Ira Gershwin). On April 30, 1962, the songs recorded were "Feel So Young" (which was probably "You Make Me Feel So Young"), "Dream", "Masquerade", and "All of You".

During the 1960s, she starred in short musical films for the Scopitone video-jukebox system with her songs that included "The Web of Love" and "The Silencer".

It was reported in Cashbox magazine on April 17, 1965, that Lansing was recording an album for RCA Records with Jimmie Haskell (and suggested that it should be titled Joi to the World of Jazz), but nothing further is known about this project.

=== Television ===
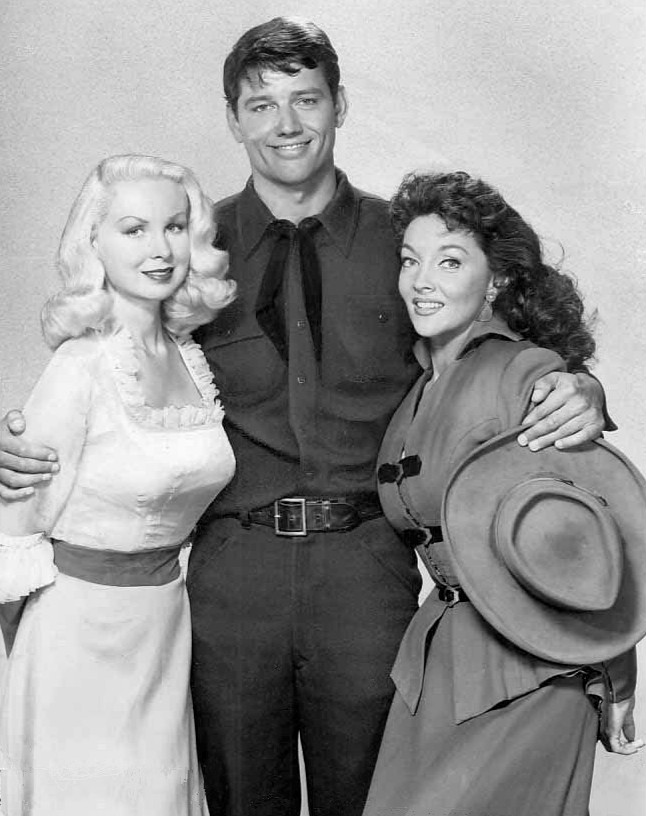
Lansing with Ralph Taeger and Mari Blanchard in Klondike (1960)

Lansing became especially active in television, being credited in over seventy series, including I Love Lucy; The Jack Benny Program; The Lucy-Desi Comedy Hour; The Adventures of Ozzie and Harriet; Perry Mason; Maverick; The Adventures of Superman; The Untouchables; Rawhide; Petticoat Junction; and The Beverly Hillbillies.

The principal television role of Lansing's career from 1955 through 1959 was as the character Shirley Swanson in The Bob Cummings Show.

Lansing appeared as herself in a 1956 I Love Lucy season 6 episode, "Desert Island". In 1957, she played Vera Payson in the Perry Mason episode "The Case of the Crimson Kiss". She achieved some distinction for beating out Lois Lane (Noel Neill) to marry Superman (George Reeves) as the title character in "Superman's Wife", a 1958 episode of Adventures of Superman.

What was possibly Lansing's best television role may have been her least-seen as the leading lady in The Fountain of Youth, a Peabody Award-winning unsold television pilot directed by Orson Welles for Desilu in 1956 and broadcast on the Colgate Theatre two years later. The half-hour film remains available for public viewing at the Paley Center for Media in New York City and Los Angeles. Welles subsequently cast Lansing in her brief role in his film Touch of Evil.

Lansing appeared in a 1960 episode of The Untouchables entitled “The Noise of Death,” playing a character named Georgina Jones. She later appeared in six episodes of The Beverly Hillbillies in the role of Gladys Flatt, the glamorous wife of bluegrass musician Lester Flatt.

Lansing has a star on the Hollywood Walk of Fame in Los Angeles for her contributions to television.

== Personal life and death ==
Lansing married Stanley Laurence Todd, her business manager, in August 1960. However, in her final years she had a covert lesbian affair with 20-year-old Alexis Hunter, who she met on the set of her final film, Bigfoot.

Lansing died from breast cancer on August 7, 1972, at St. John's Hospital, Santa Monica, California. She had been treated surgically for the disease two years earlier. She also suffered from severe anemia. While some press accounts gave her age as 37, she was actually 43 years old.

== In popular culture ==
Footage of Lansing appears in the Tex Avery animated short The House of Tomorrow, released in 1949.

A highly fictionalized version of Lansing appears in James Ellroy's 2021 novel Widespread Panic.

== Filmography ==
=== Features ===
- When a Girl's Beautiful (1947) - Model (uncredited)
- Linda, Be Good (1947) - Cameo Girl (uncredited)
- The Counterfeiters (1948) - Caroline - Art Model
- Easter Parade (1948) - Hat Model / Showgirl (uncredited)
- Julia Misbehaves (1948) - Mannequin (uncredited)
- Blondie's Secret (1948) - Bathing Girl in Dream (uncredited)
- Take Me Out to the Ball Game (1949) - Girl on Train (uncredited)
- Neptune's Daughter (1949) - Linda (uncredited)
- The Girl from Jones Beach (1949) - Model (uncredited)
- In the Good Old Summertime (1949) - Pretty Girl (uncredited)
- Key to the City (1950) - Miss Garbage Truck (uncredited)
- Pier 23 (1951) - The Cocktail Waitress
- On the Riviera (1951) - Marilyn Turner (uncredited)
- FBI Girl (1951) - Susan
- Two Tickets to Broadway (1951) - Showgirl (uncredited)
- Singin' in the Rain (1952) - Chorus Girl (uncredited)
- Glory Alley (1952) - Chorus Girl (uncredited)
- The Merry Widow (1952) - Girl at Maxim's (uncredited)
- The French Line (1953) - Model (uncredited)
- Son of Sinbad (1955) - Harem Girl (uncredited)
- Finger Man (1955) - Blonde in Bar (uncredited)
- Terror at Midnight (1956) - Hazel (uncredited)
- The Brave One (1956) - Marion Randall
- Hot Cars (1956) - Karen Winter
- Hot Shots (1956) - Connie Forbes
- Touch of Evil (1958) - Zita
- Queen of Outer Space (1958) - Larry's Girl (uncredited)
- A Hole in the Head (1959) - Dorine
- It Started with a Kiss (1959) - Checkroom Girl (uncredited)
- But Not for Me (1959) - Blonde Bathing Beauty (uncredited)
- The Atomic Submarine (1959) - Julie
- Who Was That Lady? (1960) - Florence Coogle
- Marriage on the Rocks (1965) - Lola
- Hillbillys in a Haunted House (1967) - Boots Malone
- Bigfoot (1970) - Joi Landis

=== Television ===
Year	Title	Role	Notes
1952	Racket Squad	Sandra (as Joy Lansing)	Season 2 Episode 28 "The Home Wreckers"
1952	Gang Busters	Cathy	"The Suma Case"
1953	Your Jeweler's Showcase		Episode aired Dec 22, 1953 "Farewell to Birdie McKeever"
1954	Where's Raymond?		Season 1 Episode 28 "The Enlisted Reserves"
1954	Meet Corliss Archer	Louise	Season 1 Episode 24 "Harry and the Soap Opera Queen"
1954	The Lone Wolf	Sarah Mitchell	Season 1 Episode 22 "The Mexico Story"
1954	I Led 3 Lives	Salesgirl (as Joy Lansing)	Season 2 Episode 16 "Deportation"
1954	Four Star Playhouse	Secretary	Season 3 Episode 9 "Marked Down"
1954	General Electric Theater	Marie (as Joy Lansing)	Season 3 Episode 9 "The Face Is Familiar"
1955	The Adventures of Wild Bill Hickok	Dolores Carter (as Joy Lansing)	Season 5 Episode 11 "To the Highest Bidder"
1955	So This Is Hollywood	The Blonde	Season 1 Episode 6 "He Done Her Wrong"
1955	Schlitz Playhouse	The Blonde	Season 4 Episode 33 "Who's the Blonde?"
1955	Damon Runyon Theater	(unconfirmed)	Season 1 Episode 3 "All Is Not Gold"
1955	The Ford Television Theatre	Inez Hamilton	Season 4 Episode 7 "A Smattering of Bliss"
1955	Four Star Playhouse	Miss Wilson	Season 4 Episode 6 "The Devil to Pay"
1955	Four Star Playhouse	Elevator Operator (uncredited)	Season 4 Episode 7 "Here Comes the Suit"
1955	It's a Great Life	Miss Standish	Season 1 Episode 31 "The Hospital"
1955	December Bride	Miss Sullivan	Season 1 Episode 21 "Jealousy"
1955	The People's Choice	Vicki Sommers	Season 1 Episode 8 "Sock Hires Mandy"
1955	December Bride	Linda	Season 2 Episode 4 "Ruth Neglects Matt"
1956	It's a Great Life	Betty Clark	Season 2 Episode 18 "Beauty Contest"
1956	The Star and the Story	Mitzi (as Joy Lansing)	Season 2 Episode 11 "The Difficult Age"
1956	Cavalcade of America	Florence	Season 4 Episode 13 "The Prison Within"
1956	Cavalcade of America		Season 4 Episode 14 "Star and Shield"
1956	Celebrity Playhouse	Eartha Svensen	Season 1 Episode 19 "Bachelor Husband"
1956	Jane Wyman Presents the Fireside Theatre	Terry	Season 1 Episode 30 "Shoot the Moon"
1956	Warner Brothers Presents	Greta Belle Short	Episode aired Sep 16, 1956 "The Magic Brew"
1956	Conflict	Greta Belle Short	Season 1 Episode 3 "The Magic Brew"
1956	I Love Lucy	Joi Lansing (herself)	Season 6 Episode 8 "Desert Island"
1956	Noah's Ark	Barbara Windso	Season 1 Episode 12 "A Girl's Best Friend"
1956	The Adventures of Ozzie and Harriet	Eve Adams	Season 4 Episode 14 "Art Studies"
1956	The Adventures of Ozzie and Harriet	Girl at the License Bureau	Season 4 Episode 18 "The Safe Driver"
1956	The Adventures of Ozzie and Harriet	Girl on the Plane	Season 4 Episode 20 "Personal Column"
1956	The Adventures of Ozzie and Harriet	Bubbles	Season 5 Episode 9 "The Balloons"
1957	The Gale Storm Show: Oh! Susanna	Kristine	Season 1 Episode 14 "Girls! Girls! Girls!"
1957	December Bride	Candy	Season 3 Episode 17 "Study Group"
1957	Playhouse 90	Miss Swanson	Season 1 Episode 28 "If You Knew Elizabeth"
1957	The People's Choice	Linda Archer	Season 2 Episode 32 "The Sophisticates"
1957	Climax!	Lucy	Season 3 Episode 30 "Mr. Runyon of Broadway"
1957	Perry Mason	Vera Payson	Season 1 Episode 8 "The Case of the Crimson Kiss"
1957	The Danny Thomas Show	Blonde Model	Season 4 Episode 24 "The Model"
1957	The Danny Thomas Show	Alysse	Season 5 Episode 9 "Terry, the Breadwinner"
1957	The Adventures of Ozzie and Harriet	1st Woman	Season 5 Episode 9 "The Balloons"
1957	The Adventures of Ozzie and Harriet	Blonde	Season 5 Episode 27 "Hawaiian Party"
1957	The Adventures of Ozzie and Harriet	Girl Assistant	Season 5 Episode 36 "The Coffee Table"
1957	The Adventures of Ozzie and Harriet	Barbara Benson	Season 6 Episode 5 "The Mystery Shopper"
1958	Sugarfoot	Peaches	Season 1 Episode 22 "The Disbelievers"
1958	State Trooper	Angie	Season 2 Episode 19 "The Case of the Happy Dragon"
1958	Studio 57		Season 4 Episode 17 "The Starmaker"
1958	Mickey Spillane's Mike Hammer	Jackie LaRue	Season 1 Episode 9 "Lead Ache"
1958	Adventures of Superman	Sgt. Helen J. O'Hara	Season 6 Episode 9 "Superman's Wife"
1958	Maverick	Doll Hayes	Season 1 Episode 27 "Seed of Deception"
1958	Colgate Theatre	Caroline Coates	Season 1 Episode 5 "The Fountain of Youth"
1958	The Adventures of Ozzie and Harriet	Beautiful Girl	Season 7 Episode 10 "The Dress Shop"
1959	Sea Hunt	Laura Pepper	Season 2 Episode 5 "Monte Cristo"
1959	The Jack Benny Program	Bessie Gifford	Season 9 Episode 11 "Jack Goes to Nightclub"
1959	Lux Playhouse		Season 1 Episode 11 "Stand-In for Murder"
1959	The Lucy-Desi Comedy Hour	Miss Low Neck	Season 2 Episode 4 "Lucy Wants a Career"
1955 - 1959	The Bob Cummings Show	Bridal Model / Shirley / Shirley Swanson	Seasons 1 - 5 24 Episodes
1959	Markham	Hatcheck Girl	Season 1 Episode 11 "Forty-Two on a Rope"
1959	General Electric Theater	Blonde Babysitter	Season 8 Episode 4 "Night Club"
1960	The Untouchables	Georgina Jones	Season 1 Episode 14 "The Noise of Death"
1960	The Dennis O'Keefe Show	Mavis	Season 1 Episode 20 "Follow That Mink"
1960	Mr. Lucky	Evelyn	Season 1 Episode 34 "Election Bet"
1960	This Man Dawson	Carol Dawn	Season 1 Episode 24 "Accessory to Murder"
1960	Klondike	Goldie	Season 1 Episode 1 "Klondike Fever"
1960	Klondike	Goldie	Season 1 Episode 2 "River Of Gold"
1960	Klondike	Goldie	Season 1 Episode 3 "Saints and Stickups"
1960	Klondike	Goldie	Season 1 Episode 6 "Swoger's Mule"
1960	Klondike	Goldie	Season 1 Episode 8 "Taste of Danger"
1960	The Adventures of Ozzie and Harriet	Blonde	Season 8 Episode 18 "The Uninvited Guests"
1961	Klondike	Goldie	Season 2 Episode 15 "The Man Who Owned Skagway"
1961	Klondike	Goldie	Season 2 Episode 17 "The Hostages"
1963	The Joey Bishop Show	Gloria Colby	Season 2 Episode 20 "Joey Leaves Ellie"
1963	The Adventures of Ozzie and Harriet	Clubwoman	Season 11 Episode 16 "Roadside Courtesy"
1963	The Adventures of Ozzie and Harriet	Salesgirl	Season 12 Episode 1 "The Torn Dress"
1963	Rawhide	Dance Hall Girl	Season 6 Episode 3 "Incident at El Crucero"
1963	The Beverly Hillbillies	Gladys Flatt	Season 1 Episode 20 "Jed Throws a Wingding"
1964	The Beverly Hillbillies	Gladys Flatt	Season 2 Episode 24 "A Bride for Jed"
1965	The Beverly Hillbillies	Gladys Flatt	Season 3 Episode 25 "Flatt, Clampett, and Scruggs"
1966	The Beverly Hillbillies	Gladys Flatt	Season 4 Episode 25 "Flatt and Scruggs Return"
1967	The Beverly Hillbillies	Gladys Flatt	Season 5 Episode 28 "Delovely and Scruggs"
1968	The Beverly Hillbillies	Gladys Flatt	Season 7 Episode 9 "Bonnie, Flatt, and Scruggs"
1969	The Mothers-In-Law	Barbara	Season 2 Episode 23 "Take Her, He's Mine"
1970	The Governor & J.J.	Joan Brock	Season 2 Episode 12 "P.S. I Don't Love You"

=== Short subjects ===
- Super Cue Men (1949)
- The House of Tomorrow (1949), created by Tex Avery - "The Girl" on television (uncredited)
- Joe McDoakes
  - "So You Want to Go to a Nightclub" (1954) - Lorna Lamour (uncredited)
  - "So You're Taking in a Roomer" (1954) - Blonde Roomer (uncredited)
  - "So You Want to Be a V.P." (1955) - Miss Poindexter - Secretary (uncredited)
  - "So You Want to Be a Policeman" (1955) - Blonde Getting Ticket (uncredited)
  - "So You Think the Grass Is Greener" (1956) - Geraldine Backspace (uncredited)
- The Fountain of Youth (1956), scripted & directed by Orson Welles - Carolyn Coates
- The Starmaker (1957), starring Bette Davis, on television - Mrs. Barclay Alexander
