= Fort Courageous =

1965 film by Lesley Selander

- Theatrical release poster
- Directed by: Lesley Selander
- Written by: Richard H. Landau
- Produced by: Hal Klein
- Starring: Fred Beir; Don "Red" Barry; Hanna Landy; Harry Lauter; Walter Reed; Joe Patridge
- Cinematography: Gordon Avil
- Edited by: John F. Schreyer
- Music by: Richard LaSalle
- Production company: 20th Century Fox
- Distributed by: 20th Century Fox
- Release date: May 1, 1965
- Running time: 72 minutes
- Country: United States
- Language: English

Fort Courageous is a 1965 American Western film directed by Lesley Selander and written by Richard H. Landau. The film stars Fred Beir, Don "Red" Barry, Hanna Landy, Harry Lauter, Walter Reed and Joe Patridge. The film was released on May 1, 1965, by 20th Century Fox.

== Plot ==
An ex-cavalry sergeant, being escorted to prison after being convicted of a crime he didn't commit, finds himself leading the remnants of a unit that has been under Indian attack at a fort. The commanding officer has been killed, the Indians vastly outnumber them, and the only bargaining chip they have is the fact that they have captured the Indian chief's son.

== Cast ==
- Fred Beir as Sgt. Lucas
- Don "Red" Barry as Maj. Ames
- Hanna Landy as Ruth Tate
- Harry Lauter as Joe
- Walter Reed as Doc
- Joe Patridge as Capt. Howard
- Fred Krone as Soldier
- Michael Carr as Indian
- George Sawaya as Indian
- Cheryl MacDonald as Elizabeth Tate

== Production ==
Parts of the film were shot at the Kanab movie fort, Johnson Canyon, and the Gap in Utah.

== See also ==
- List of American films of 1965
