= The Traitor Within =

1942 film by Frank McDonald

- Theatrical release poster
- Directed by: Frank McDonald
- Screenplay by: Jack Townley
- Story by: Charles G. Booth
- Produced by: Armand Schaefer
- Starring: Don "Red" Barry; Jean Parker; George Cleveland; Ralph Morgan; Jessica Newcombe; Bradley Page
- Cinematography: Bud Thackery
- Edited by: Charles Craft
- Music by: Mort Glickman
- Production company: Republic Pictures
- Distributed by: Republic Pictures
- Release date: December 16, 1942
- Running time: 62 minutes
- Country: United States
- Language: English

The Traitor Within is a 1942 American action film directed by Frank McDonald and written by Jack Townley. The film stars Don "Red" Barry, Jean Parker, George Cleveland, Ralph Morgan, Jessica Newcombe and Bradley Page. The film was released on December 16, 1942, by Republic Pictures.

== Cast ==
- Don "Red" Barry as Sam Starr
- Jean Parker as Molly Betts
- George Cleveland as 'Pop' Betts
- Ralph Morgan as John Scott Ryder
- Jessica Newcombe as Mrs. Ryder
- Bradley Page as Al McGonigle
- Dick Wessel as Henchman Otis
- Emmett Vogan as Carter
- Edward Keane as Davis
- Eddie Acuff as Tommy
- Sam McDaniel as Melrose
- Eddie Johnson as Louie
- Marjorie Cooley as June
