= The Hostage Heart =

1977 American television film

- Genre: Drama
- Written by: Andrew J. Fenady
- Directed by: Bernard McEveety
- Starring: Sharon Acker; Cameron Mitchell; Vic Morrow; Bradford Dillman; Belinda Montgomery
- Theme music composer: Fred Karlin
- Country of origin: United States
- Original language: English

Production
- Producer: Andrew J. Fenady
- Cinematography: Matthew F. Leonetti
- Editor: Melvin Shapiro
- Running time: 100 min.
- Production companies: Andrew J. Fenady Productions; MGM Television

Original release
- Network: CBS
- Release: September 9, 1977

The Hostage Heart is a 1977 American made-for-television drama film directed by Bernard McEveety, written by Andrew J. Fenady, and based on Gerald Green's novel. It premiered on Friday, September 9, 1977, on CBS.

== Plot ==
Terrorists take over the operating room where a billionaire is having coronary bypass surgery and demand a $10 million ransom.

== Cast ==
- Sharon Acker as Martha Lake
- Stephen Davies as John Trask
- George DiCenzo as Chief George Reinhold
- Cameron Mitchell as Arnold Stade
- Peter Palmer as Dr. Licata
- Belinda Montgomery as Fiona
- Allan Rich as Dr. Motzkin
- Paul Shenar as James Cardone
- Robert Walden as Brian O'Donnell
- Carl Weathers as Bateman Hooks
- Bradford Dillman as Dr. Eric Lake
- Loretta Swit as Chris LeBlanc
- Vic Morrow as Steve Rockewicz
- Hari Rhodes as Don Harris
- Ralph Taeger as Lt. Dawson

== Production ==
Sharon Acker and Bradford Dillman were cast in June 1977. A registered nurse supervised the medical scenes.
