= Hillbillys in a Haunted House =

1967 film by Jean Yarbrough

- Theatrical release poster
- Directed by: Jean Yarbrough
- Written by: Duke Yelton
- Produced by: Bernard Woolner
- Starring: Ferlin Husky; Sonny James; Joi Lansing; Don Bowman; Lon Chaney Jr. John Carradine; Basil Rathbone
- Cinematography: Vaughn Wilkins
- Edited by: Holbrook N. Todd
- Music by: Hal Borne
- Distributed by: Woolner Brothers Pictures Inc.
- Release date: May 1967
- Running time: 88 minutes
- Country: United States
- Language: English

Hillbillys in a Haunted House is a 1967 American musical horror comedy film starring Ferlin Husky and Joi Lansing, and directed by Jean Yarbrough. The film is a sequel to The Las Vegas Hillbillys (1966), with Joi Lansing replacing Mamie Van Doren in the role of "Boots Malone".

== Plot ==
A pair of country singers and their band are headed to Nashville, Tennessee. Their car unfortunately breaks down and they stop overnight at an abandoned house, which turns out to be haunted. A ring of international spies who live in the haunted house are seeking a top-secret formula for rocket fuel. While it is never revealed for whom they are spying, they carry out their activities under the cover of a supposed haunted house, which comes complete with a gorilla lurking in the basement.

== Cast ==
Credits Order

- Ferlin Husky as Woody Wetherby
- Joi Lansing as Boots Malone
- Don Bowman as Jeepers
- John Carradine as Dr. Himmil
- Lon Chaney Jr. as Maximillian
- Linda Ho as Madame Wong
- Basil Rathbone as Gregor
- Molly Bee as herself
- Merle Haggard as himself
- Sonny James as himself
- Jim Kent as himself
- Biff Adam (drummer) as himself (uncredited)
- Marcella Wright as herself
- Richard Webb as Agent Jim Meadows
- George Barrows as Anatole the gorilla
- Virginia Ann Lee as Agent Ming Toy

== Home media ==
On March 14, 2000, VCI Video released Hillbillys in a Haunted House on DVD, and later, on May 29, 2007, re-released the film, along with The Las Vegas Hillbillys, as part of a four film Hillbilly Comedy Collection.

It is also available on RiffTrax.

== See also ==
- List of American films of 1967
- The Beverly Hillbillies
- B movie
