= Davey Davison =

American actress

- Born: Lillian Marie Davis; May 19, 1943; Norfolk, Virginia, U.S.
- Occupation: Actress
- Years active: 1961–1981
- Spouse(s): Clyde Ware (m. 1962; div. 1971) Craig Huebing (m. 1978; div. 1980) Mike Silverman (m. 1998; died 2010)
- Parent(s): Aubrey Allen Davis; L’marie Brewer

Davey Davison (born Lillian Marie Davis) is a retired American actress.

== Career ==
Davison appeared in the following television series: Hazel, Route 66, Shannon, The New Breed, The Eleventh Hour, Empire, Gunsmoke, General Hospital, Perry Mason, and others. She appeared in the films The Strangler, War Party, Marriage on the Rocks and Angel, Angel, Down We Go.

Davison was nominated for Outstanding Performance in a Supporting Role by an Actress in 1963 for The Eleventh Hour episode "Of Roses and Nightingales and Other Lovely Things".

Davison married Mike Silverman in 1998, and they remained married until his death in 2010.

== Filmography ==
=== Film ===
Year	Title	Role	Notes
1964	The Strangler	Tally Raymond	
1965	War Party	Sarah Lundeen	
1965	Marriage on the Rocks	Lisa Sterling	
1968	Angel, Angel, Down We Go	Anna Livia	
1972	No Drums, No Bugles	Callie Gatrell	
1973	When the Line Goes Through	Mayme Rucker	

=== Television ===
Year	Title	Role	Notes
1961	Route 66	Jo	Episode: "A Bridge Across Five Days"
1961	Shannon	Effie Nolan	Episode: "The Big Fish"
1961–1962	Hazel	Nancy	3 episodes
1962	The New Breed	The New Breed	Episode: "The Torch"
1962	The Eleventh Hour	Laura Hunter	Episode: "Of Roses and Nightingales and Other Lovely Things"
1962, 1965	Rawhide	Fanah / Meg Brewer	2 episodes
1963	Empire	Judy Hollister	Episode: "Season of Growth"
1963	Perry Mason	Melinda Tarr	Episode: "The Case of the Potted Planter"
1963	My Three Sons	Marcia	Episode: "The Date Bureau"
1963, 1967	Bonanza	Valerie Townsend / Louise Corman	2 episodes
1964	The Nurses	Carey Sonnenberg	Episode: "The Human Transaction"
1964	Mr. Novak	Edie Currie	Episode: "Little Girl Lost"
1964	Slattery's People	Annette Rowan	Episode: "Question: Where Vanished the Tragic Piper?"
1964	Dr. Kildare	Dr. Julia McQueen	Episode: "Never Is a Long Day"
1964	Gunsmoke	Mary Stocker	Episode: "Run, Sheep, Run"
1964, 1965	Ben Casey	Janet Spaulding / Kathy Evans	2 episodes
1965, 1969	The Virginian	Jenny Larkin / Joan Westley	2 episodes
1966	Run for Your Life	Marcia Huston	Episode: "Who's Watching the Fleshpot?"
1966–1969	The F.B.I.	Various roles	4 episodes
1967	Dick Tracy	Tess Trueheart Tracy	Television film
1967–1981	Insight	Grace / Dinah / Rita	5 episodes
1968	Premiere	June Fielding	Episode: "Crisis"
1969	The Name of the Game	Julie Witten	Episode: "Chains of Command"
1972	The Rookies	Molly Lassiter	Episode: "Pilot"
1972–1988	Days of Our Lives	Various roles	6 episodes
1973, 1975	Cannon	Laura Balford / Betty Wilson	2 episodes
1974	Mannix	Cathy Walker	Episode: "Walk a Double Line"
1974	Lincoln	Emily Todd Helm	Episode: "Mrs. Lincoln's Husband"
1974	The Manhunter	Cassy Flynn	Episode: "The Ma Gantry Gang"
1974–1977	The Streets of San Francisco	Various roles	3 episodes
1975	Petrocelli	Ginny Morgan	Episode: "A Deadly Vow"
1976	Rich Man, Poor Man Book II	Virginia Calderwood	Episode: "Chapter I"
1977	ABC Afterschool Special	Hollis' Mother	Episode: "The Horrible Honchos"
1977	Tales of the Unexpected	Amanda Kelly	Episode: "No Way Out"
1978	The Magical World of Disney	Betsy Tanner	Episode: "Three on the Run"
1981	Dynasty	Margaret	2 episodes
