= Don "Red" Barry =

American actor (1910–1980)

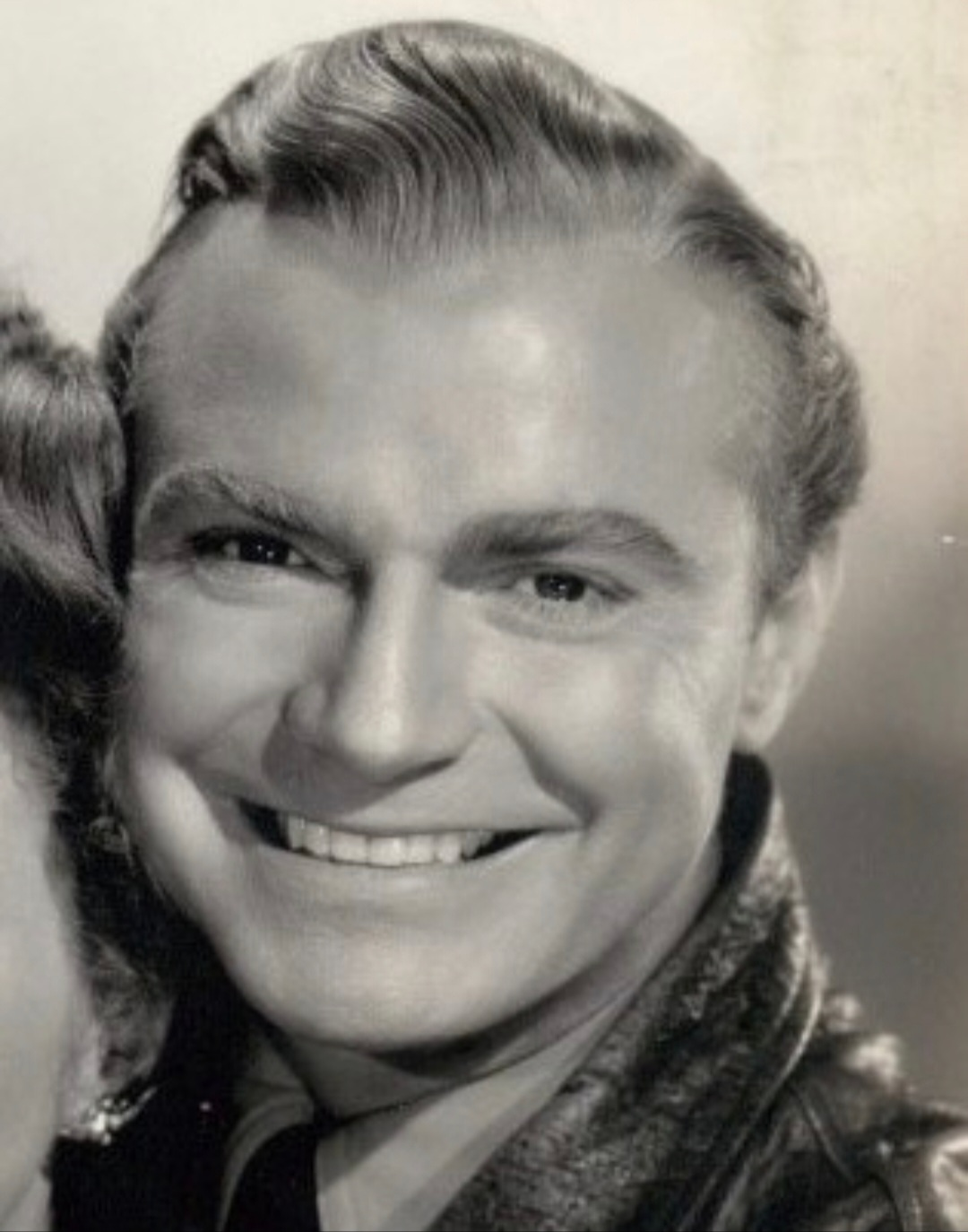
- Film still of Barry in The Traitor Within (1942)
- Born: Milton Poimboeuf; January 11, 1910 (Note: 1909, 1911, and 1912 also cited; 1910 aligns with most records and the Social Security Death Index.); Houston, Texas, U.S.
- Died: July 17, 1980 (aged 70); North Hollywood, California, U.S.
- Resting place: Forest Lawn Memorial Park, Hollywood Hills, California, U.S.
- Occupations: Actor, writer
- Years active: 1933–1980
- Spouses: Peggy Stewart (m. 1940; div. 1944); 1 child: Ona-Dell Ward (m. 1947; div.c. 1952); 1 child; Barbara Patin (m. 1963); 2 children

Don Barry (né Milton Poimboeuf; January 11, 1910 – July 17, 1980), also known as Red Barry, was an American film and television actor. He was nicknamed "Red" after appearing as the first Red Ryder in the highly successful 1940 film Adventures of Red Ryder with Noah Beery Sr.; the character was played in later films by "Wild Bill" Elliott and Allan Lane. Barry went on to bigger-budget films following Red Ryder, but none reached his previous level of success. He played Red Doyle in the 1964 Perry Mason episode "The Case of the Simple Simon".

== Early years ==
Barry was born Milton Poimboeuf in Houston, Texas, to parents Louis Leonce Poimboeuf and Emma Elizabeth (Murray) Poimboeuf. The year has been disputed, with estimates ranging between 1909 and 1912. However, his mother died of tuberculosis in March 1910 (one month shy of her 20th birthday), rendering subsequent years impossible. He attended Allen Academy and the Texas School of Mines (now the University of Texas at El Paso). Prior to acting, Barry had been a high-school and college football player. He went to Los Angeles to work in advertising.

== Career ==
=== Stage ===
Barry's initial venture into acting was in a production of Tobacco Road on stage in New York City in the late 1930s.

=== Acting ===
Barry first entered films as an extra and in small roles. He was discovered by John Wayne during a football game with Wayne providing Barry introductions to producers. He appeared in a variety of roles before he found his forte and nickname "Red" in the Republic Pictures serial The Adventures of Red Ryder (1940). Though Barry was short and stocky rather than the lean and lanky hero of the Red Ryder comic strip, studio head Herbert J. Yates demanded Barry play the role. Yates thought Barry's appearance similar to James Cagney, with Barry unsuccessfully asking Yates to cast him in gangster films. Barry continued in Western roles and made two war films Remember Pearl Harbor (1942) for Republic as well as being lent to 20th Century Fox for The Purple Heart (1944). He continued making Westerns for Republic and other studios.

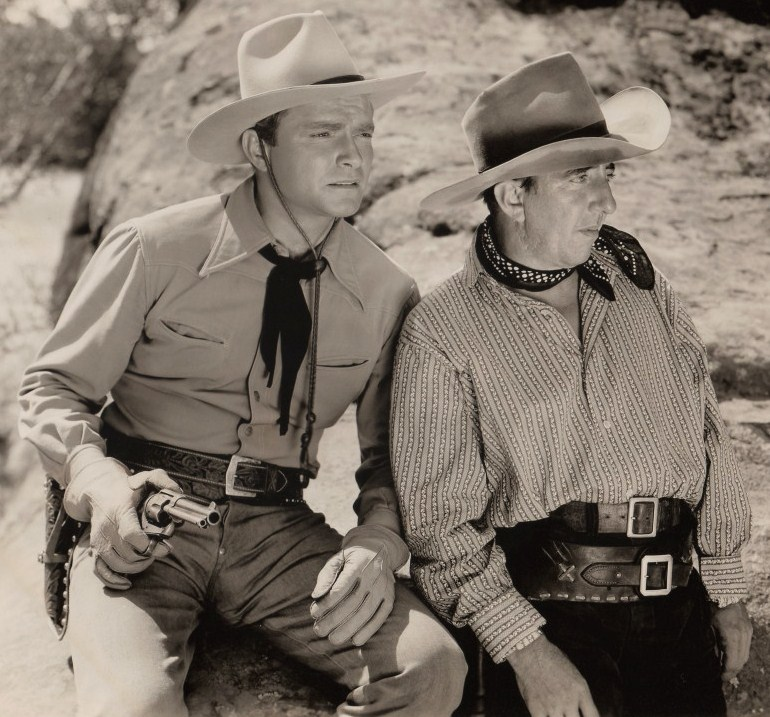
Don "Red" Barry and Wally Vernon in The Man from the Rio Grande (1943)

By the 1950s, Barry was a supporting actor instead of playing leads in Westerns. Early in 1955, he appeared as the bandit Milt Sharp in an episode of the syndicated series, Stories of the Century.

Barry played Clete in the 1956 Western film Seven Men from Now, starring Randolph Scott. In 1958, he appeared (credited as Donald Barry) on the TV Western Cheyenne in the episode "Dead to Rights". He guest-starred as Tanner in the 1958 episode "Bullet Proof" of the ABC/Warner Bros. series Sugarfoot, starring Will Hutchins; he was cast as Arkansas in the 1959 Sugarfoot episode "The Return of the Canary Kid". Barry appeared four times in the ABC/WB Western Colt .45. Barry was cast as black-clad gunfighter in a 1961 episode, "Last Stop: Oblivion", of the ABC/WB Western series, Maverick with Jack Kelly and fellow guest star Buddy Ebsen, as well as an even larger titular role in a James Garner episode set in New Orleans titled "The Resurrection of Joe November". In 1961, Barry appeared as Dusty McCade in the TV Western Lawman in the episode titled "Hassayampa".

Barry's voice in the television Westerns sounded much like that of the character actor Dub Taylor. About this time, he also guest-starred on two other ABC/WB dramas, Bourbon Street Beat and The Roaring 20s. He appeared, as well, in the syndicated crime drama, U.S. Marshal, starring John Bromfield, and the NBC education drama series, Mr. Novak, starring James Franciscus. Barry continued making Westerns as part of the ensemble casts of A.C. Lyles' Paramount second feature Westerns in the mid-1960s. In 1966, Barry played Confederate soldier Lt. Farrow in the Western film Alvarez Kelly with William Holden and a one-eyed Richard Widmark. Barry played a supporting role in the 1968 film, Shalako with Sean Connery, as well as in the television series Dragnet.

Barry played supporting roles in dozens of television series, particularly Westerns. He appeared eight times on the long-running NBC series, The Virginian, in the 1960s. He appeared in six episodes of Michael Landon's Little House on the Prairie as racist farmer Judd Larrabee, and was a recurring character, Lt. Ray Snedigar, on the 1960s detective show Surfside 6. He also appeared in all-star TV miniseries, such as Rich Man, Poor Man Book II and The Dream Merchants.

=== Writing ===
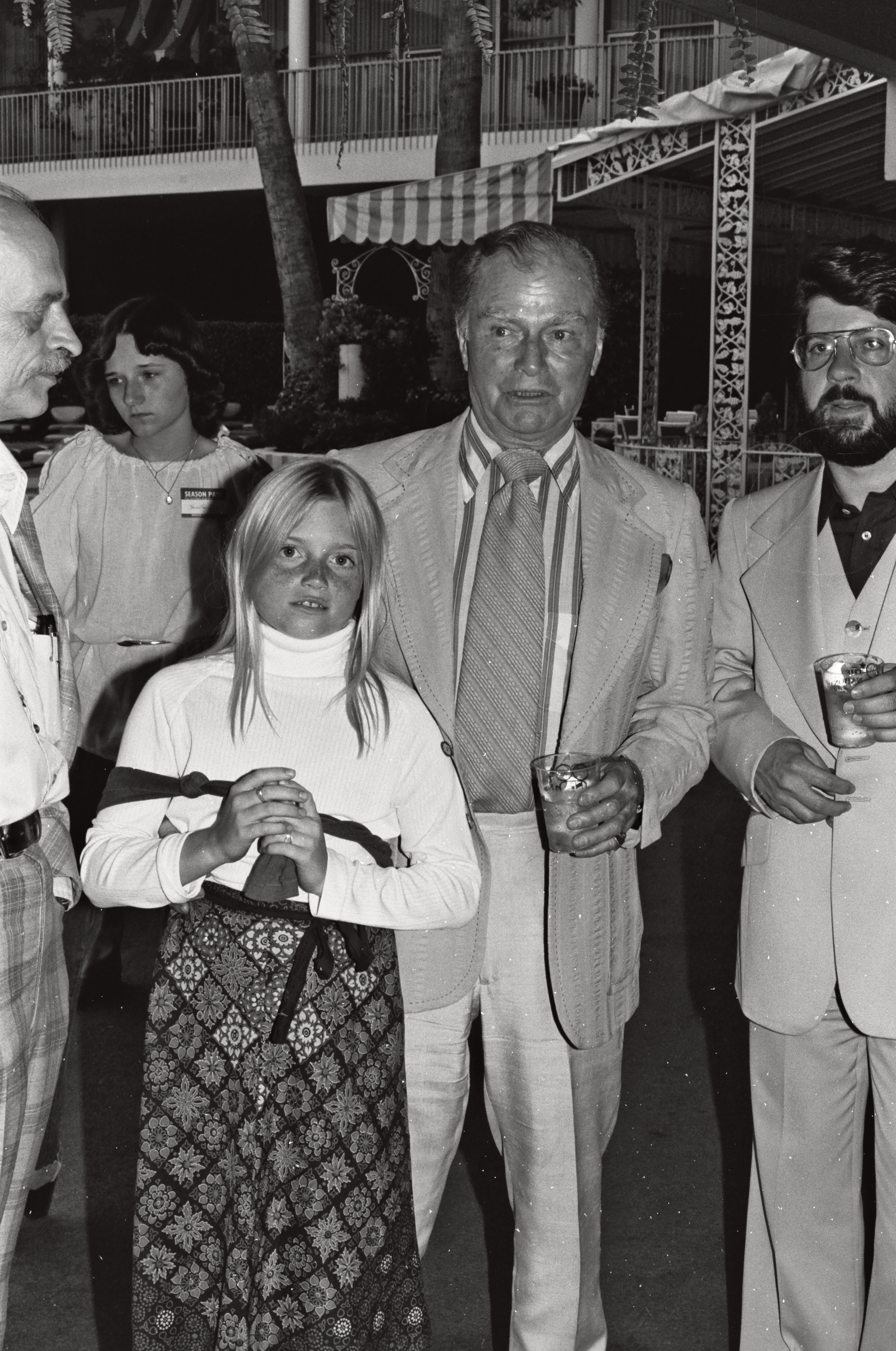
Barry at a party at the National Film Society convention, May 1979

In addition to acting, Barry was also a writer, writing the stories upon which the films Red Light (1949) starring George Raft and Virginia Mayo, Train to Tombstone (1950), and Convict Stage (1965) were based, and co-writing the screenplay and directing and playing the leading role of Jesse James in Jesse James' Women (1954).

== Personal life ==
Barry and actress Peggy Stewart were married in 1940 and divorced on April 12, 1944. They had a son, Michael, born on November 18, 1943. He married Ona-Dell Ward on October 6, 1947. They had one son, but divorced around 1952.

In early November 1955, Susan Hayward got into a physical altercation with actress Jil Jarmyn who encountered Hayward visiting Barry's apartment, reportedly for an early morning coffee. The incident was popularized in celebrity tabloids and became the source of insider jokes.

== Death ==
On July 17, 1980, Barry shot himself in the head at his home, shortly after police had left the residence after investigating a domestic dispute. He was estranged at the time from his third wife, Barbara, with whom he had two daughters. He is interred at Forest Lawn Memorial Park in the Hollywood Hills of Los Angeles.

== Selected filmography ==
- This Day and Age (1933) .... Student (uncredited)
- Flying Down to Rio (1933) .... Dancer (uncredited)
- The Hoosier Schoolmaster (1935) .... Rebel Soldier (uncredited)
- Night Waitress (1936) .... Mario Rigo
- Beloved Enemy (1936) .... Mike - IRA Patriot (uncredited)
- When's Your Birthday? (1937) .... Marty - Gunman (uncredited)
- The Woman I Love (1937) .... Michel
- Dead End (1937) .... Dr. Flynn - Intern (uncredited)
- The Last Gangster (1937) .... Billy Ernst (uncredited)
- Navy Blue and Gold (1937) .... Mason - Southern Institute Football Player
- All American Sweetheart (1937) .... Bob - Crew Leader (uncredited)
- Saleslady (1938) .... Babcock
- Sinners in Paradise (1938) .... Jessup
- Letter of Introduction (1938) .... Disbelieving Man at Barry's Party (uncredited)
- The Crowd Roars (1938) .... Pete Mariola
- Young Dr. Kildare (1938) .... Dr. Collins (uncredited)
- The Duke of West Point (1938) .... Cadet Grady
- There's That Woman Again (1938) .... Bellboy (uncredited)
- Panama Patrol (1939) .... Lieutenant Loring
- First Offenders (1939) .... Art
- Calling Dr. Kildare (1939) .... Dr. Collins
- Only Angels Have Wings (1939) .... 'Tex'
- S.O.S. Tidal Wave (1939) .... 'Curley' Parsons
- Wyoming Outlaw (1939) .... Will Parker
- Calling All Marines (1939) .... 'Blackie' Cross
- Saga of Death Valley (1939) .... Jerry
- The Secret of Dr. Kildare (1939) .... Dr. Collins - Intern (uncredited)
- Days of Jesse James (1939) .... Jesse James
- Ghost Valley Raiders (1940) .... Tim 'The Tolusa Kid' Brandon
- Adventures of Red Ryder (1940, Serial) .... 'Red' Ryder
- One Man's Law (1940) .... Jack Summers
- Sailor's Lady (1940) .... Second Paymaster (uncredited)
- The Tulsa Kid (1940) .... Tom 'The Tulsa Kid' Benton
- Frontier Vengeance (1940) .... Jim Sanders
- Texas Terrors (1940) .... Bob Millbourne / Robert Mills
- Wyoming Wildcat (1941) .... Bill Gannon
- The Phantom Cowboy (1941) .... Jim Lawrence
- Two Gun Sheriff (1941) .... Jim 'The Sundown Kid' McKinnon / Bruce McKinnon
- Desert Bandit (1941) .... Texas Ranger Bob Crandall
- Kansas Cyclone (1941) .... Jim Randall
- The Apache Kid (1941) .... Pete 'The Apache Kid' Dawson
- Death Valley Outlaws (1941) .... Johnny Edwards
- A Missouri Outlaw (1941) .... Cliff Dixon
- Arizona Terrors (1942) .... Jim Bradley
- Stagecoach Express (1942) .... Dave Gregory
- Jesse James, Jr. (1942) .... Johnny Barrett
- Remember Pearl Harbor (1942) .... Private Steve 'Lucky' Smith
- The Cyclone Kid (1942) .... Johnny 'The Cyclone Kid' Dawson
- The Sombrero Kid (1942) .... Jerry Holden / Jerry Clancy
- Outlaws of Pine Ridge (1942) .... 'Chips' Barrett
- The Traitor Within (1942) .... Sam Starr
- The Sundown Kid (1942) .... 'Red' Tracy / Wade Crandall
- Dead Man's Gulch (1943) .... 'Tennessee' Colby
- Carson City Cyclone (1943) .... Gilbert Phalen
- Days of Old Cheyenne (1943) .... Clint Ross
- Fugitive from Sonora (1943) .... Parson Dave Winters / Ted Winters / Keeno Phillips
- Black Hills Express (1943) .... Lon Walker
- The West Side Kid (1943) .... Johnny April
- The Man from the Rio Grande (1943) .... Lee Grant
- Canyon City (1943) .... Terry Reynolds - Posing As The Nevada Kid
- California Joe (1943) .... Lieutenant Joe Weldon
- The Purple Heart (1944) .... Lieutenant Peter Vincent
- Outlaws of Santa Fe (1944) .... Bob Conroy
- My Buddy (1944) .... Eddie Ballinger
- Bells of Rosarita (1945) .... Don Barry
- The Chicago Kid (1945) .... Joe Ferrill
- The Last Crooked Mile (1946) .... Tom Dwyer
- Plainsman and the Lady (1946) .... 'Feisty'
- Out California Way (1946) .... Don Barry
- That's My Gal (1947) .... Benny Novak
- Slippy McGee (1948) .... 'Slippy' McGee
- Madonna of the Desert (1948) .... Tony French
- Lightnin' in the Forest (1948) .... Stan Martin
- Train to Alcatraz (1948) .... Doug Forbes
- Ringside (1949) .... Mike O'Hara / 'King Cobra'
- The Dalton Gang (1949) .... Marshal Larry West - Posing As 'Rusty' Stevens
- Square Dance Jubilee (1949) .... Don Blake
- Tough Assignment (1949) .... Dan Reilly
- Red Desert (1949) .... Pecos Jones
- I Shot Billy the Kid (1950) .... William H. 'Billy The Kid' Bonney
- Gunfire (1950) .... Frank James / 'Bat' Fenton
- Train to Tombstone (1950) .... Len Howard
- Border Rangers (1950) .... Bob Standish - Posing As 'The Rio Kid'
- My Outlaw Brother (1951) .... Texas Ranger Hank (uncredited)
- Untamed Heiress (1954) .... Mike 'Spider Mike' Lawrence
- Jesse James' Women (1954) .... Jesse James / J. Woodsen
- The Twinkle in God's Eye (1955) .... Dawson
- I'll Cry Tomorrow (1955) .... Jerry
- Seven Men from Now (1956) .... Clete
- Gun Duel in Durango (1957) .... Larry
- China Doll (1958) .... Master Sergeant Hal Foster
- Frankenstein 1970 (1958) .... Douglas Row
- Born Reckless (1958) .... 'Okie'
- Andy Hardy Comes Home (1958) .... Councilman Fitzgerald (uncredited)
- The Last Mile (1959) .... Drake
- Bat Masterson (1959) .... Luke Short
- Warlock (1959) .... Edward Calhoun (uncredited)
- The Big Operator (1959) .... Sergeant
- Walk Like a Dragon (1960) .... Cabot
- Ocean's 11 (1960) .... McCoy (uncredited)
- Buffalo Gun (1961) .... Murdock
- Rawhide (1961) – Grut in S3:E25, "Incident of the Running Man"
- Walk on the Wild Side (1962) .... Dockery
- Twilight of Honor (1963) .... Judson Elliot
- Law of the Lawless (1964) .... 'Red'
- Iron Angel (1964) .... 'Reb'
- The Carpetbaggers (1964) .... Soundman (uncredited)
- War Party (1965) .... Sergeant Chaney
- Fort Courageous (1965) .... Captain Howard
- Convict Stage (1965) .... Marshal Jethro Karnin
- Town Tamer (1965) .... 'Tex'
- Apache Uprising (1965) .... Henry Belden
- Alvarez Kelly (1966) .... Lieutenant Farrow
- Red Tomahawk (1966) .... Bly - Deserter
- Hostile Guns (1967) .... Ed Johnson
- Fort Utah (1967) .... Harris
- Bandolero! (1968) .... Jack Hawkins
- The Shakiest Gun in the West (1968) .... Reverend Zachary Gant
- Shalako (1968) .... 'Buffalo'
- The Cockeyed Cowboys of Calico County (1970) .... 'Rusty'
- Dirty Dingus Magee (1970) .... 'Shotgun'
- Rio Lobo (1970) .... Feeny - The Bartender (uncredited)
- One More Train to Rob (1971) .... Charlie
- Johnny Got His Gun (1971) .... Jody Simmons
- Junior Bonner (1972) .... Homer Rutledge
- Adam-12, as Charlie Bishop, ex-con not adjusting to life outside of prison, 10/29/74
- Blazing Stewardesses (1975) .... Mike Trask
- Whiffs (1975) .... Sergeant Post
- Hustle (1975) .... Airport Bartender
- From Noon till Three (1976) .... 'Red Roxy'
- Orca (1977) .... Dock Worker
- Doctor Dracula (1978) .... Elliot
- Hot Lead and Cold Feet (1978) .... Bartender
- The Swarm (1978) .... Pete Harris
- Hooper (1978) .... Sheriff
- Buckstone County Prison (1978) .... Warden Coley
- The One Man Jury (1978) .... Sergeant Murphy
- Shame, Shame on the Bixby Boys (1978)
- Back Roads (1981) .... Pete (final role; aired posthumously)
