= The Man from the Rio Grande (1943 film) =

1943 film by Howard Bretherton

- Theatrical release poster
- Directed by: Howard Bretherton
- Screenplay by: Norman S. Hall
- Produced by: Edward J. White
- Starring: Don "Red" Barry; Wally Vernon; Twinkle Watts; Harry Cording; Nancy Gay; Kirk Alyn
- Cinematography: John MacBurnie
- Edited by: Ralph Dixon
- Music by: Mort Glickman
- Production company: Republic Pictures
- Distributed by: Republic Pictures
- Release date: October 18, 1943
- Running time: 55 minutes
- Country: United States
- Language: English

The Man from the Rio Grande is a 1943 American Western film directed by Howard Bretherton and written by Norman S. Hall. The film stars Don "Red" Barry, Wally Vernon, Twinkle Watts, Harry Cording, Nancy Gay and Kirk Alyn. The film was released on October 18, 1943, by Republic Pictures.

== Cast ==
- Don "Red" Barry as Lee Grant
- Wally Vernon as Jimpson Simpson
- Twinkle Watts as Twinkle Watts
- Harry Cording as John King
- Nancy Gay as Doris King
- Kirk Alyn as Editor Tom Traynor
- Paul Scardon as Hanlon
- Roy Barcroft as Henchman Ace Holden
- Kenne Duncan as Henchman
- Jack Kirk as Henchman Curly
- Kansas Moehring as Henchman Art
