= Sam Benedict =

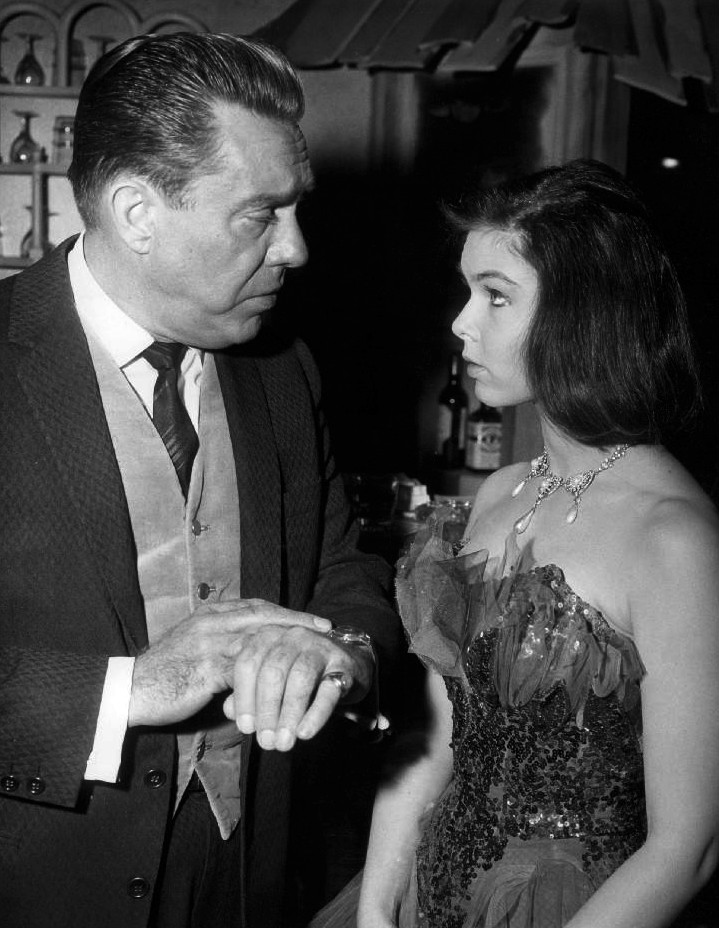
- Edmond O'Brien and Yvonne Craig in 1963 episode "Sugar and Spice and Everything..."
- Genre: Legal drama
- Created by: E. Jack Neuman
- Written by: E. Jack Neuman; Ellis Marcus; Joseph Calvelli
- Directed by: Abner Biberman; Richard Donner; Ida Lupino; Paul Nickell
- Starring: Edmond O'Brien; Richard Rust; Joan Tompkins
- Theme music composer: Nelson Riddle
- Composer: Jeff Alexander
- Country of origin: United States
- Original language: English
- No. of seasons: 1
- No. of episodes: 28

Production
- Producer: William Froug
- Camera setup: Single-camera
- Running time: 45–48 minutes
- Production company: MGM Television

Original release
- Network: NBC
- Release: September 15, 1962 – March 30, 1963

Sam Benedict is an American legal drama that aired on NBC from September 1962 to March 1963. The series was created and executive produced by E. Jack Neuman, and produced by William Froug. The series starred Edmond O'Brien in the title role, with Richard Rust as his assistant Hank Tabor, and Joan Tompkins as his secretary Trudy Wagner.

The character Sam Benedict is based on real-life lawyer Jake Ehrlich, who served as technical consultant for the series. According to Hal Erickson in his 2009 Encyclopedia of Television Law Shows, "Beyond his salty delivery of lines and bulldozer courtroom demeanor, Sam Benedict shared with Jake Ehrlich an up-from-poverty background (including a short stint as a prizefighter!), and a sincere empathy for underdog clients."

== Guest stars ==
- Inger Stevens
- Vera Miles
- Fred Aldrich
- Elizabeth Ashley
- Phyllis Avery
- Larry Blyden
- Anthony Call
- Spencer Chan
- James Chandler
- Sidney Clute
- Fred Coby
- Hazel Court
- Yvonne Craig
- Ken Drake
- Howard Duff
- Ross Elliott, four episodes as Marty Rhodes
- Stefan Gierasch
- Sam Gilman
- Gloria Grahame
- Arthur Hanson
- Ellen Holly
- Marsha Hunt
- Diana Hyland
- Jean Inness
- Ray Kellogg
- Nancy Kelly
- Jess Kirkpatrick
- Otto Kruger
- Elizabeth MacRae
- Joyce Meadows
- Burgess Meredith
- Gary Merrill
- Gregory Morton
- John Nolan
- Richard O'Brien
- Maria Palmer
- Michael Parks
- Joseph V. Perry
- Claude Rains
- Ken Renard
- Stephen Roberts
- Ruth Roman
- Cosmo Sardo
- Joseph Schildkraut
- Alfred Shelly
- Barbara Stuart
- Kelly Thordsen
- George Tobias
- Arthur Tovey

== Episode list ==
No.	Title	Directed by	Written by	Original release date
1	"Hannigan"	Boris Sagal	E. Jack Neuman	September 15, 1962
Guest star Gene Raymond. Guest star Lloyd Bochner. Co-starring Katharine Bard as Patricia Hannigan, Tammy Marihugh as Bridgette Hannigan. with Sandy Kenyon, John Alderson, Joan Tompkins, Emily McLaughlin, Donna Douglas, Robert Brubaker, Arthur Hanson, Larry Thor and Edgar Stehli as Barney Tibbets. Uncredited (in order of appearance): Stuart Holmes, Eddie Hice, Eugene Jackson, Bert Stevens, Spencer Chan, Colin Kenny
2	"A Split Week in San Quentin"	Lamont Johnson	Joseph Calvelli	September 22, 1962
Guest star Jack Weston. Introducing Katharine Ross. with Joan Tompkins as Trudy Wagner. Stefan Gierasch, Rex Ingram, George Kane, J. Pat O'Malley, David Sheiner, Larry Haddon, Robert Ball, Henry Beckman, Jeff Carter and Joe DeSantis.
3	"Nor Practice Makes Perfect"	Boris Sagal	William Froug	September 29, 1962
Guest star Claude Rains. with Joan Tompkins as Trudy Wagner. Linda Watkins, John Anderson, Narda Onyx, Ed Prentiss, Frank Puglia, Adrienne Marden, Joey Scott, Rupert Crosse. Uncredited (in order of appearance): Jerry Ziesmer, Colin Kenny
4	"Nothing Equals Nothing"	Lamont Johnson	John W. Bloch	October 6, 1962
Guest star Nancy Kelly. Also starring Otto Kruger. and Constance Ford. with Joan Tompkins as Trudy Wagner. Edward Asner as Everett Colner, David Sheiner as Ben Williams, Joe De Santis as Judge Parrelli, Henry Beckman as Gerald Spangler, Karl Swenson as Barney Rosvalley. Willie Tsang as Charlie Sin, Mai Tai Sing as Lily Sin, Kendrick Huxham as Evan, Gage Clarke as Judge Newland, Alexander Lockwood as Judge Baker. Uncredited (in order of appearance): Bert Stevens, Eddie Hice, Colin Kenny, Robert Bice Note: this is the series' sole episode that was filmed in color
5	"Tears for a Nobody Doll"	Roger Kay	Ellis Marcus	October 13, 1962
Guest Star Miyoshi Umeki. Co-Starring Joanna Barnes as Cordelia Montagne, Michael Constantine as Judge Tower. with Joan Tompkins as Trudy Wagner. Virginia Gregg as Judge Semmeler, Aki Aleong as Arthur Nishibue, Joey Walsh as Howard Munsey, Harold Gould as Al Walpole, Beulah Quo as Mrs. Matsui, Allen Jung as Mr. Matsui, S. John Launer as Walter Price, John Alvin as Burt and Robert F. Simon as Bill Gottlieb. Uncredited (in order of appearance): Eugene Jackson, Fred Aldrich
6	"Twenty Aching Years"	Paul Nickell	Story by : Ellis Marcus and John Kneubuhl; Teleplay by : Ellis Marcus	October 20, 1962
Guest Starring Herschel Bernardi. Harry Townes. Paul Carr. Special Guest Star Joanne Linville. with Joan Tompkins as Trudy Wagner. Robert J. Wilke as Radich, Alexander Lockwood as Judge Baker, Francis de Sales as Judge Kramer, Marjorie Corley as Court Clerk. Bob Biheller as Reald, Gene Benton as Court Clerk and Leonard Nimoy as Joe Shatley.
7	"Maddon's Folly"	William Graham	E. Jack Neuman	October 27, 1962
Guest Starring Vera Miles. and Robert Lansing. with Joan Tompkins as Trudy Wagner. Woodrow Parfrey as Vernon Kurtz, Paul Newlan as Judge Quinbury, Ken Renard as Bentley Coombs, Edward O'Brien as Christopher Dane, Joel Fluellen as Ames, Eric Norman as Father Dodgan, Donald Kerr as Cab Driver, Roy Taguchi as Waiter and Bernard Kates as Dobmeyer.
8	"Hear the Mellow Wedding Bells"	Ida Lupino	Joseph Petracca & David Rayfiel	November 3, 1962
Guest starring Joseph Schildkraut. and Zohra Lampert. Special Guest Star Larry Blyden. with Joan Tompkins as Trudy Wagner. Barry Kelley as Senator Condor, Ross Elliott as Marty Rhodes, Bernard Fein as Harry Owens, Darryl Richards as Leon Katz. Lewis Charles as Charlie, Francis DeSales as Judge, Tom Nello as Cab Driver, Rusty Lane as Court Clerk. and Stanley Adams as Square John McWayde. Uncredited: Eddie Hice.
9	"Life Is a Lie, Love Is a Cheat"	Don Medford	George Eckstein	November 10, 1962
Guest Star Audrey Meadows. Co-Starring Joe Mantell. Co-Starring Ed Nelson. with Joan Tompkins as Trudy Wagner. Robert H. Harris, Rusty Lane, Paul Newlan, Ollie O'Toole, John Anderson, Jeane Wood, Roy Glenn, Vince Chase and Dara Howard as Gloria Gorman. Uncredited: Caryl Lincoln
10	"The Bird of Warning"	Abner Biberman	Story by : Barry Trivers; Teleplay by : Leonard Heideman & Paul Mason	November 17, 1962
Guest star Diana Hyland. Co-Starring Maria Palmer, and George Tobias. with Joan Tompkins as Trudy Wagner. Robert H. Harris as Judge Xavier Thomas, Noah Keen as Judge Travis, Adam Williams as Burton Harper, J. Edward McKinley as Dr. Albert Burnson. Henry Beckman as Jerry Spangler, Ollie O'Toole as Court Clerk, Will J. White as Police Officer and Gale Page as Mrs. Heistand. Uncredited: Eddie Hice
11	"The View from an Ivory Tower"	Paul Nickell	Frederick C. Houghton Jr.	November 24, 1962
Guest star Dan O'Herlihy and Phyllis Avery. Co-Starring Lawrence Dobkin, and David Sheiner. with Joan Tompkins as Trudy Wagner. Vaughn Taylor as Pine, Leo Penn as George Klaus, Al Ruscio as Nico Garza, Grace Lee Whitney as Susan Craig, Robert Brubaker as Lieutenant Eubank, John Zaremba as Medical Examiner, Ollie O'Toole as Clerk, Mike Dugan as Deputy, Steve Harris as Assistant District Attorney and George Macready as Jason Kirwell
12	"Everyone's Playing Polo"	Ida Lupino	Joseph Calvelli	December 1, 1962
Guest star Burgess Meredith Co-Starring Milton Selzer, Joby Baker, Yvonne Craig, and Irene Dailey. with Joan Tompkins as Trudy Wagner. John Anderson as Jim Bradley, Harlan Warde as Judge Raymond Dewey, Helen Kleeb as Hawknosed Woman, Robert Bailey as Judge Ionic, Tom Greenway as Tom Brelson, Ray Montgomery as Policeman, Maxine Gates as Chubby Woman
13	"Too Many Strangers"	Lawrence Dobkin	Ellis Marcus	December 8, 1962
Guest Star Marsha Hunt. Special Guest Star Gloria Grahame. Co-Starring Judi Meredith and Michael Parks. with Joan Tompkins as Trudy Wagner. Robert J. Wilke as Lt. Radich, Ross Elliott as Marty Rhodes, Bernard Fein as Harry Owen. Harriet MacGibbon as Melia Branton, John Duke as Perry Lewis, Robert Bailey as Judge Paul Ioni, Arthur Hanson as Judge.
14	"So Various, So Beautiful"	Abner Biberman	Arthur Orloff	December 15, 1962
15	"Where There's a Will"	Paul Nickell	Art Wallace	December 22, 1962
16	"The Target Over the Hill"	Richard Donner	Story by : Leonard Heideman; Teleplay by : Leonard Heideman and E. Jack Neuman	December 29, 1962
Guest star Inger Stevens. Co-Starring Everett Sloane, and Arch Johnson. with Joan Tompkins as Trudy Wagner. Jacques Aubuchon as Dr. Arnold Kozlenko, Patrick Hale as Billy Stone, Edward Mallory as Resident Doctor, Crahan Denton as Dr. Anson Holiday, Byron Kane as Court Clerk, Sidney Clute as Patient, Clancy Cooper as bailiff and Dolores Sutton as Sarah Franklin. Uncredited: Don Ames
17	"Not Even the Gulls Shall Weep"	Richard Donner	Story by : John Hawkins; Teleplay by : Sidney Marshall	January 5, 1963
18	"The Boiling Point"	Richard Donner	Story by : S. Bar-David; Teleplay by : Paul Mason	January 12, 1963
Guest Star David Wayne. Special Guest Star Gary Merrill. Co-Starring Abner Biberman with Joan Tompkins as Trudy Wagner. Kenneth Tobey as Lt. Pete Kender, Alexander Lockwood as Judge Baker, Elizabeth MacRae as Gretchen Jerome, John McLiam as Inspector. William Sargent as Art Walters, Jo Helton as Claude Merriman, Arthur Hanson as Tom Alderson, Susan Adams as Iris Walters, Lisa Froug as Carole Merriman
19	"Green Room, Grey Morning"	Abner Biberman	Carey Wilbur	January 19, 1963
Guest star Ruth Roman. Co-Starring Tige Andrews. with Joan Tompkins as Trudy Wagner. Sam Gilman as Dr. Springheart, Frank Albertson as Frank Gordon, Ken Lynch as Charles DeFranco, Ralph Manza as Pat Smith, Anthony Call as Intern, Bernadette Hale as Receiving Nurse. Uncredited: Albert Cavens
20	"Run Softly, Oh Softly"	Paul Henreid	Story by : Ed Waters; Teleplay by : Leonard Heideman	January 26, 1963
Guest Starring: Brian Keith, and Lori Martin With Joan Tompkins as Trudy Wagner. Philip Ober as Leo Calbern, Max Showalter as Tom Buchannan, Bert Remsen as Jack Seibert, Robert H. Harris as Judge F. Xavier Thomas, Bernard Fein as Harry Owens, Ed Prentiss as Pete Cahurn, Valentin de Vargas as Tiburcio Ibanez, and Barbara Stuart as Mrs. Herman Beasley
21	"Sugar and Spice and Everything..."	Ida Lupino	Sidney Marshall	February 9, 1963
Guest star Arthur O'Connell. Also Starring Yvonne Craig. Co-Starring Robert Emhardt, Co-Starring Gail Kobe. with Joan Tompkins as Trudy Wagner. William Schallert as Neil Carlson, Paul Birch as Capt. Boyd, Peter Mamakos as Marco, Tyler McVey as Newsman, Richard Donner as Grover Stann, Bill Baldwin as Court clerk, Paul Kent as Doctor, Alfred Shelly as Bailiff, Mary Benoit as Matron and Robert Ellin as Dr. Michael Franklin.
22	"Some Fires Die Slowly"	Richard Donner	Art Wallace	February 16, 1963
Guest Starring Barry Sullivan and James MacArthur. Special Guest Star Betty Field George Mitchell as Joseph Martinson, Karl Swenson as Barney Rossvalley, Gage Clark as Judge Edward Rogers, Jesslyn Fax as Howard Munsey, Ted Knight as Judge Walker, Norman Burton as Lt. Warren Jones, Joe Perry as Marshall Frescoe and Dara Howard as Cindy Wynn.
23	"Image of a Toad"	Don Richardson	Ellis Marcus	February 23, 1963
Guest Starring: Nehemiah Persoff, and Beverly Garland. Co-Starring: Doro Merande, Patricia Huston with Joan Tompkins as Trudy Wagner Russell Collins as Walker Smith, James Flavin as Douglas Ward, Paul Newlan as Judge Morton K. Doyle, William Zuckert as Ben Weber, Charlotte Fletcher as Hostess, Charity Grace as Mrs. Mary Hart
24	"Seventeen Gypsies and a Sinner Named Charlie"	Abner Biberman	Joseph Calvelli	March 2, 1963
Special Guest Star: Edmond O'Brien as Charlie Dunphie. Introducing Special Guest Star: Maria O'Brien as Mary With: Ross Elliott as Marty Rhodes, Robert Bailey as Judge Ionic, Barbara Morrison as Mrs. Philbrook Kurt Russell as Knute, Kyle Johnson as Dutch, Katy Sweet as Emily, Barry Livingston as Frankie, Manuel Padilla as Joey, Rory Stevens as Augie
25	"Accomplice"	Richard Donner	Larry Cohen	March 9, 1963
Guest Star: Eddie Albert. Co-Starring: Phillip Pine, Roger Perry and Brock Peters. Oliver McGowan as Judge DeFranco, Alexander Lockwood as Judge Baker, Frank Leo as Court Clerk, Art Lewis as Reporter, John Nolan as Reporter and Ellen Holly as Elissa Reagan
26	"Read No Evil"	Abner Biberman	Robert Bloomfield	March 16, 1963
Guest Star: Robert Lansing. Co-Starring: Olive Deering and Susan Silo. Introducing Frank Sinatra, Jr. as Roy Faring, with Joan Tompkins as Trudy Wagner Gregory Morton as Judge Vesy, Shirley O'Hara as Helen Eddy, Paul Fix as Jason Hewitt, Michael Harris as Foster, Walter Kelley as Court Clerk, and Donald Woods as Byron Leonard
27	"Of Rusted Cannons and Fallen Sparrows"	Richard Donner	John T. Dugan	March 23, 1963
Guest Star: James Gregory. Special Guest Star: Nina Foch. Co-Starring: Michael Strong with Joan Tompkins as Trudy Wagner Lisabeth Hush as Jacquie Bonneau, James Anderson as Sheriff Conway, Donald Barry as Judge Edward Barrett, Russell Thorsen as Thomas Morgan, Bill Walker as Negro Victim, Bobby Troup as Bearded Man
28	"Season for Vengeance"	Abner Biberman	Franklin Barton	March 30, 1963

== Disclaimer in end credits ==
"Sam Benedict is based on the real living character of J. W. (Jake) Ehrlich but the stories are fictional."

== Home media ==
On November 22, 2016, Warner Bros. released Sam Benedict – The Complete Series on DVD via their Warner Archive Collection. This is a manufacture-on-demand (MOD) release, available through Warner's online store and Amazon.com.
