= Hice =

Hice is a surname. Notable people with the surname include:

- Eddie Hice (1930–2015), American stuntman and actor
- Herbert Hice Whetzel (1877–1944), American plant pathologist and mycologist
- Jody Hice (born 1960), American politician, radio host, and political activist

== See also ==
- Rice (surname)
