= Rosemarie Bowe =

American actress (1932 – 2019)

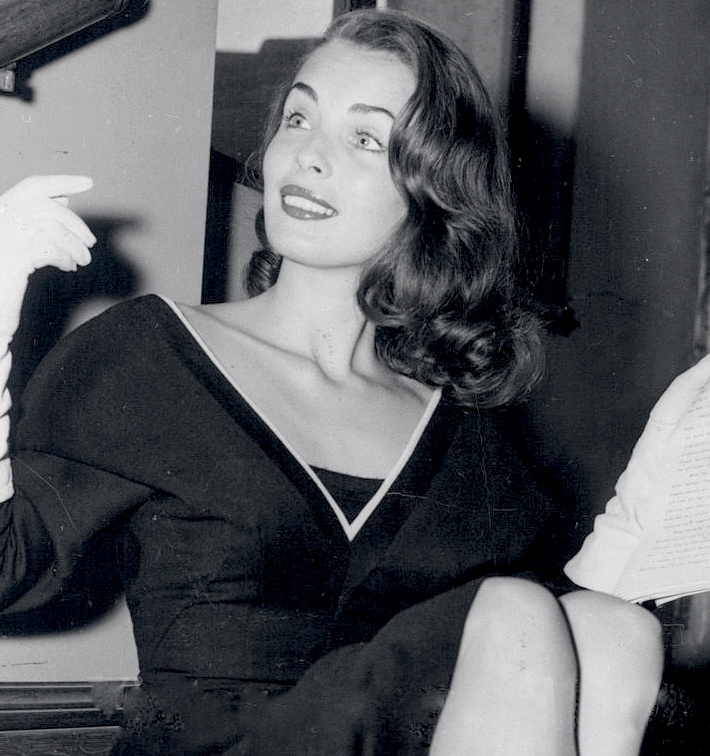
- Bowe in 1952
- Born: Rose Marie Bowe; September 17, 1932; Butte, Montana, U.S.
- Died: January 20, 2019 (aged 86)
- Other names: Laura Bowe; Rosemarie Stack
- Occupations: Actress, model
- Years active: 1952–1986
- Spouse: Robert Stack (m. 1956; died 2003)
- Children: 2
- Relatives: Taran Killam (great-nephew); David Bowe (nephew)

Rosemarie Bowe Stack (born Rose Marie Bowe; September 17, 1932 – January 20, 2019) was an American model and actress, best known for her appearances in several films in the 1950s.

Born in Butte, Montana, Bowe was primarily raised in Tacoma, Washington. She began her career modeling in Los Angeles, California, before being cast in uncredited bit parts. Her first major role was a supporting part in the 1954 adventure film The Adventures of Hajji Baba. She would have several lead roles before officially retiring from acting following her appearance in John Cassavetes' Big Trouble (1986).

She was married to actor Robert Stack from 1956 until his death in 2003.

== Early life ==
Bowe was born Rose Marie Bowe on September 17, 1932, in Butte, Montana, the youngest child of Dennis and Ruby Bowe. Bowe's father was a building contractor and her mother was a dress designer. She had an older sister, Claire (maternal grandmother of actor Taran Killam), and a brother, Sidney. The family moved to Tacoma, Washington, when Bowe was a child. She was raised Lutheran.

As a teenager, she worked as a model in Seattle. She attended Stadium High School in Tacoma, where she was active in theater and dance, and graduated in 1950. The same year, Bowe won the "Miss Tacoma" beauty contest. In 1951, she was one of six finalists in competition for queen of the Home Show and Building Exposition in Los Angeles, California.

Bowe briefly attended Tacoma Community College before moving to Los Angeles.

== Career ==
=== Modeling work ===
She was crowned Miss Tacoma and Miss Montana in 1950. In May 1951, Bowe competed in a contest to choose the queen of the sixth annual Home Show and Building Exposition. Along with Mary Ellen Nichols, she was a runner-up to the contest winner, Linda Peterson.

In 1951, Bowe traveled with her mother to Los Angeles, California, to see her brother Sidney off to the military during the Korean War. "Washington is very much like London," Bowe reflected in an interview. "Kinda gloomy, dark skies, unless it's summertime. Washington state is beautiful from June to September, but after that it's overcast, everyday practically. The minute my mother and I saw California palm trees and the sun, we really liked it and we decided we could stay here for awhile."

Having done modeling work in the past, Bowe secured work in Los Angeles as a model, appearing in several pin-up portraits by artist Gil Elvgren. Her measurements were 36–25–36. She was 5'5" tall and had blue-green eyes. Her modeling agency was contacted by a high-fashion photographer, Christa, who suggested she pose for national and fashion magazine portraits. Modeling for magazines such as Eye, Tempo, and Blightly, she eventually made the transition from model to actress in television.

Bowe's look was at times likened to both Marilyn Monroe and Grace Kelly. She always modeled high fashion rather than lingerie or bathing suits. She was never asked by photographers to pose for cheesecake pictures as were many a pin-up girl. She once said, "Of all the auditions and interviews I have had with casting men, directors, and producers, not one ever made a pass at me. I guess they were afraid of me."

=== Acting career ===
Bowe moved to Hollywood in 1950. In 1952, a court approved her seven-year contract with film agent Charles K. Feldman. When his production plans stalled, she obtained a contract with Columbia Pictures. She was trained in dramatic acting by Benno Schneider. Her early experience as an entertainer included performing as a singer and dancer in amateur musicals.

Early in her career, she used the name Laura Bowe.

As a screen debutante, Bowe appeared in Lovely To Look At (1952) with Kathryn Grayson and Red Skelton. Bowe's part is uncredited, as is her depiction of a swimmer in Million Dollar Mermaid (1952). The same year in June, she appeared on the cover of Life. In 1954, she appeared in The Golden Mistress and The Adventures of Hajji Baba. The former was Bowe's first movie after requesting her release from Columbia. As Ann Dexter, she was featured opposite John Agar in an R.K. Productions release, set in Haiti. Bowe performed her own stunts on the set, and during filming, she almost drowned, was stung by a sea urchin, and sustained bumps, bruises, and insect bites.

Bowe was under option to 20th Century Fox when she filmed The Peacemaker (1956). Based on a novel, the Western also featured James Mitchell. It was released by Hal R. Makelim Productions. Announced in April 1954, the Makelim plan for producing pictures "guaranteed a flow of film products through a fixed-fee system."

Her later acting roles included appearances in the films Murder on Flight 502 (1977) and Big Trouble (1986), both of which starred her husband Robert Stack, and the TV movie Making of a Male Model (1983).

She appeared in a 1963 episode of Burke's Law, credited as Rosemarie Bowe. The episode was "Who Killed Beau Sparrow?".

== Personal life ==
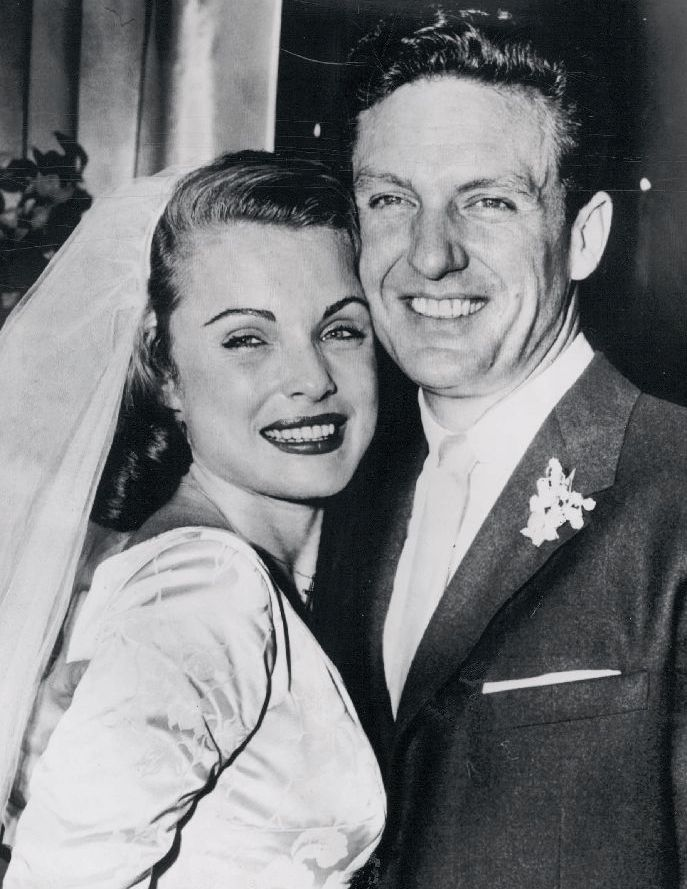
Bowe and husband Robert Stack on their wedding day, 1956

On January 23, 1956, Bowe married Robert Stack in Beverly Hills Lutheran Church. The couple became the parents of a daughter, Elizabeth Langford Stack, on January 20, 1957. They shared mutual passions for the outdoors, especially sailing and riding. Bowe temporarily gave up her career when her children were young.

In October 1969, Bowe was in an automobile accident in Sacramento, California, and sustained serious internal injuries. She crashed into a concrete culvert because of a mechanical failure in the rental car she was driving. Kathleen Lund, the wife of Art Lund, was killed in the accident. At the time, Stack was filming The Name of the Game. He chartered a flight to be with her. Art Lund filed a $750,000 wrongful-death suit, alleging Bowe had been driving at an "excessive speed" during the accident.

Bowe died on January 20, 2019, exactly one week after the centennial of her late husband Robert Stack's birth. Her son, Charles Robert Stack, is a retired investment banker. Her nephew David Bowe is also an actor.

== Filmography ==
Year	Title	Role	Notes	Ref.
1952	Lovely to Look At	Model	Uncredited	
1952	Million Dollar Mermaid	Swimmer	Uncredited	
1954	The Adventures of Hajji Baba	Ayesha		
1954	The Golden Mistress	Ann Dexter		
1955	The Big Bluff	Fritzie Darvel		
1955	The View from Pompey's Head	Kit Robbins Garrick		
1956	The Peacemaker	Ann Davis		
1959	John Paul Jones	(minor role)	Uncredited	
1961	All in a Night's Work	Tony's Blonde Friend		
1967	The Peking Medallion	Bar Patron	Also known as: The Corrupt Ones	
1975	Murder on Flight 502	Dorothy Saunders	Television film	
1983	Making of a Male Model	Lila Chandler	Television film	
1986	Big Trouble	Mrs. Winslow		

== Sources ==
- Aaker, Everett (2006). Encyclopedia of Early Television Crime Fighters: All Regular Cast Members in American Crime and Mystery Series, 1948-1959. Jefferson, North Carolina: McFarland. ISBN 978-0-786-42476-4.
- Erens, Patricia (1978). The Films of Shirley MacLaine. New York: A. S. Barnes. ISBN 978-0-498-01993-7.
- Maltin, Leonard (1992). Leonard Maltin's Movie and Video Guide 1993. New York: Plume. ISBN 978-0-452-26857-9.
- Weaver, Tom (2010). "Rosemarie Bowe on The Golden Mistress (1954)". A Sci-Fi Swarm and Horror Horde: Interviews with 62 Filmmakers. McFarland. pp. 152–8. ISBN 978-0-786-44658-2.
