= Jesse Wayne =

American actor and stuntman

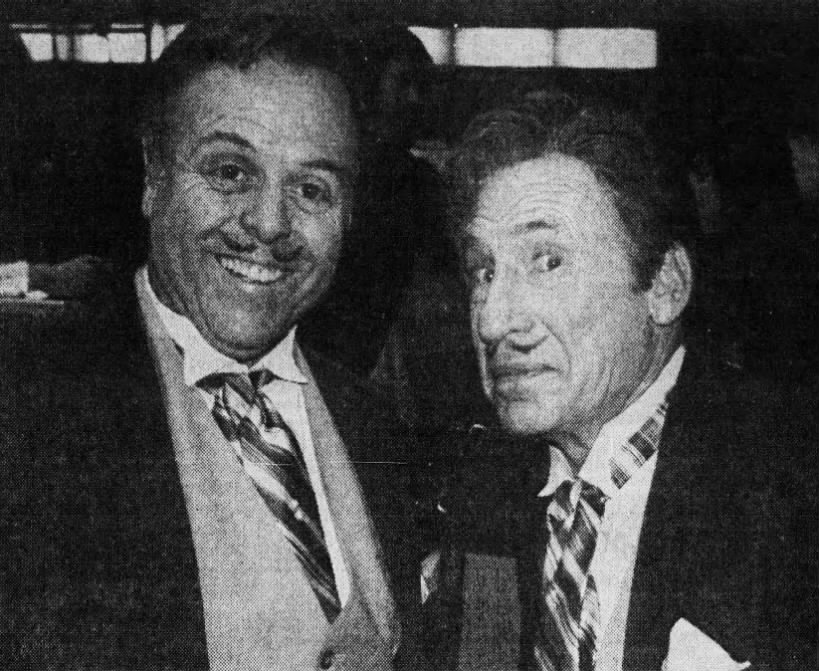
- Wayne (left) with Mel Brooks, 1987
- Born: September 14, 1941 (age 84); Los Angeles, California, U.S.
- Occupations: Actor, stuntman

Jesse Wayne (born September 14, 1941) is an American actor and stuntman. He is best known for serving as a stunt double for Mickey Rooney in numerous films such as It's a Mad, Mad, Mad, Mad World, Breakfast at Tiffany's, The Black Stallion, The Comic, Platinum High School, Pete's Dragon and Everything's Ducky.

Wayne guest-starred in numerous television programs including Gunsmoke, Bonanza, Rawhide, Wagon Train, Ben Casey, Destry, The Virginian, F Troop and My Favorite Martian. He also appeared in numerous films such as Young Frankenstein, The Great Race, There Was a Crooked Man..., The Comedy of Terrors, The Oscar, What Did You Do in the War, Daddy?, Young Fury, The Adventures of Bullwhip Griffin and Spaceballs.
