= The Peacemaker (1956 film) =

1956 film by Ted Post

- Directed by: Ted Post
- Screenplay by: Hal Richards; Jay Ingram
- Based on: The Peacemaker by Richard Poole
- Produced by: Hal R. Makelim
- Starring: James Mitchell; Rosemarie Bowe; Jan Merlin; Jess Barker; Hugh Sanders; Taylor Holmes; Philip Tonge; Dorothy Patrick
- Cinematography: Les Shorr
- Edited by: William Shea
- Music by: George Greeley
- Color process: Black and white
- Production company: Hal R. Makelim Productions
- Distributed by: United Artists
- Release date: November 1956
- Running time: 82 minutes
- Country: United States
- Language: English

The Peacemaker is a 1956 American Western film directed by Ted Post and starring James Mitchell and Rosemarie Bowe. Hal Richards based the script on the novel of the same name by Richard Poole.

Producer Hal R. Makelim intended The Peacemaker to be the first of a series of low-budget productions. According to Merlin, who played the villain, shooting took only "seven or ten days."

Although the film featured some successful character actors like Hugh Sanders in supporting roles, none of the performers qualified as marquee names; in fact, at this point in his career, star James Mitchell was known only as a dancer (despite some dramatic roles at MGM). While Makelim tried to compensate for these problems by marketing the film to a religious audience—the local clergymen were invited to the film's premiere in Wichita--The Peacemaker enjoyed only sporadic distribution and was not widely reviewed. Makelim managed to produce only one more film, Valerie (1957), and Mitchell would not make another film appearance until The Turning Point (1977).

Tommy Kirk says he appeared in the film although he thought the star was Sterling Hayden.

== Plot ==
A former gunfighter who went to prison but then took up religion arrives in a western town as the new preacher. There he finds a feud between the ranchers and the farmers. The Railroad Agent is after the ranchers land and has his men causing all the trouble. The new preacher sets out to bring the two sides together and he says he will not need a gun.

== Cast ==
- James Mitchell as Terrall Butler
- Rosemarie Stack as Ann Davis (as Rosemarie Bowe)
- Jan Merlin as Viggo Tomlin
- Jess Barker as Ed Halcomb
- Hugh Sanders as Lathe Sawyer
- Herbert Patterson as Gray Arnett
- Dorothy Patrick as Edith Sawyer
- Taylor Holmes as Mr. Wren
- Robert Armstrong as Sheriff Ben Seale
- Philip Tonge as Elijah Maddox
- David McMahon as Sam Davis
- Wheaton Chambers as Doc Runyan
- Jack Holland as Walt Kemper
- Nancy Evans as Miss Smith
- Harry Shannon as Drunken Cowpuncher

== See also ==
- List of American films of 1956
