= Robert Stack =

American actor (1919–2003)

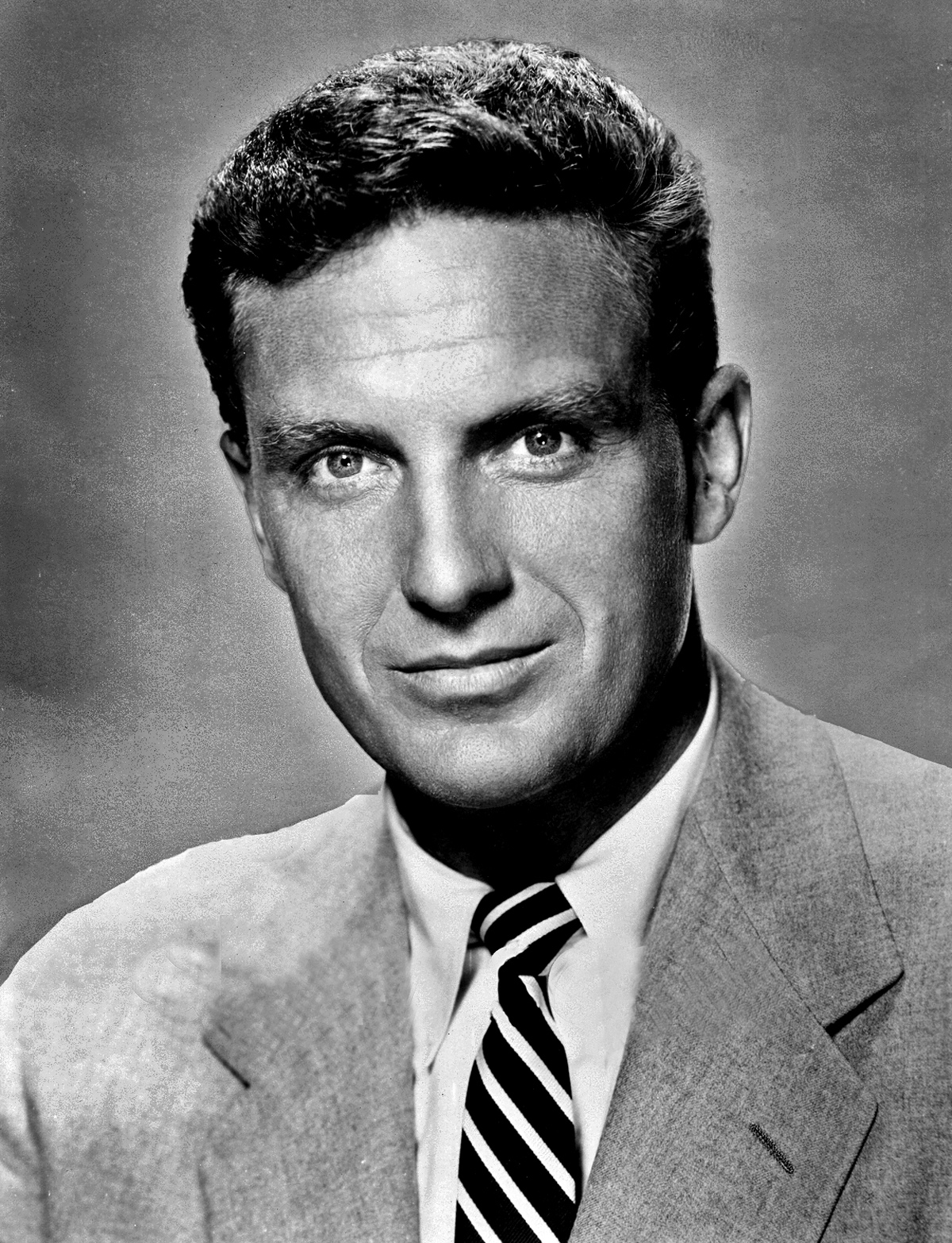
- Stack in the 1950s
- Born: Charles Langford Modini Stack; January 13, 1919; Los Angeles, California, U.S.
- Died: May 14, 2003 (aged 84); Los Angeles, California, U.S.
- Occupation: Actor
- Years active: 1934–2003
- Spouse: Rosemarie Bowe (m. 1956)
- Children: 2

Signature
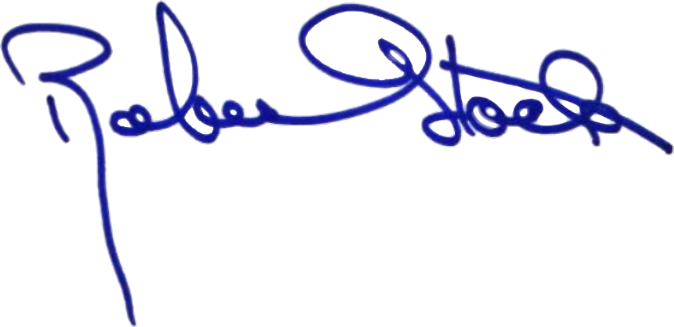

Robert Stack (born Charles Langford Modini Stack; January 13, 1919 – May 14, 2003) was an American actor and television host. Known for his deep voice and commanding presence, he appeared in over 40 feature films. He starred in the ABC television series The Untouchables (1959–1963), for which he won the 1960 Primetime Emmy Award for Outstanding Performance by an Actor in a Series, and later hosted/narrated the true-crime series Unsolved Mysteries (1987–2002). He was also nominated for an Academy Award for Best Supporting Actor for his role in the film Written on the Wind (1956). Later in his career, Stack was known for his deadpan comedy roles that lampooned his dramatic on-screen persona, most notably as Captain Rex Kramer in Airplane! (1980).

== Early life ==
He was born Charles Langford Modini Stack in Los Angeles, California, but his first name, selected by his mother, was changed to Robert by his father. He spent his early childhood in Adria and Rome, becoming fluent in French and Italian at an early age, and did not learn English until his return to Los Angeles when he was seven.

His parents divorced when he was a year old, and he was raised by his mother, Mary Elizabeth (née Wood). His father, James Langford Stack, a wealthy advertising agency owner, later remarried his ex-wife, but died when Stack was 10.

He always spoke of his mother with the greatest respect and love. When he collaborated with Mark Evans on his autobiography, Straight Shooting, he included a picture of himself and his mother that he captioned "Me and my best girl". His maternal grandfather, opera singer Charles Wood, studied voice in Italy and performed there under the name "Carlo Modini." Stack had another opera-singer relative: American baritone Richard Bonelli (born George Richard Bunn), who was his uncle.

Stack took some drama courses at the University of Southern California, where he played on the polo team. Clark Gable was a family friend.

By the time he was 20, Stack had achieved minor fame as a sportsman. He was an avid polo player and shooter. His brother and he won the International Outboard Motor Championships, in Venice, Italy, and at age 16, he became a member of the All-American Skeet Team. He set two world records in skeet shooting and became national champion. In 1971, he was inducted into the National Skeet Shooting Hall of Fame. The Piikani Nation of the Blackfoot Confederacy, which was known as the Peigan Nation before the 1990s, honored him by inducting him into their chieftainship in 1953 (July 2, 1953, Newspaper) as Chief Crow Flag. In 1962, Stack received the Golden Plate Award of the American Academy of Achievement.

== Career ==
Stack took drama courses at Bridgewater State University, a mid-sized liberal-arts school located 25 miles southeast of Boston. His deep voice and good looks attracted the attention of producers in Hollywood. When Stack visited the lot of Universal Studios at age 20, producer Joe Pasternak offered him an opportunity to enter the business. Recalled Stack, "He said, 'How'd you like to be in pictures? We'll make a test with Helen Parrish, a little love scene.' Helen Parrish was a beautiful girl. 'Gee, that sounds keen,' I told him. I got the part."

Stack's first film, which teamed him with Deanna Durbin, was First Love (1939), produced by Pasternak. This film was considered controversial at the time, as he was the first actor to give Durbin an on-screen kiss. Stack won critical acclaim for his next role, The Mortal Storm (1940) starring Margaret Sullavan and James Stewart, and directed by Frank Borzage at Metro-Goldwyn-Mayer. He played a young man who joins the Nazi party.

Back at Universal, Stack was in Pasternak's A Little Bit of Heaven (1940), starring Gloria Jean, who was that studio's back-up for Deanna Durbin. Stack was reunited with Durbin in Pasternak's Nice Girl? (1941). Stack then starred in a Western, Badlands of Dakota (1941), co-starring Richard Dix and Frances Farmer.

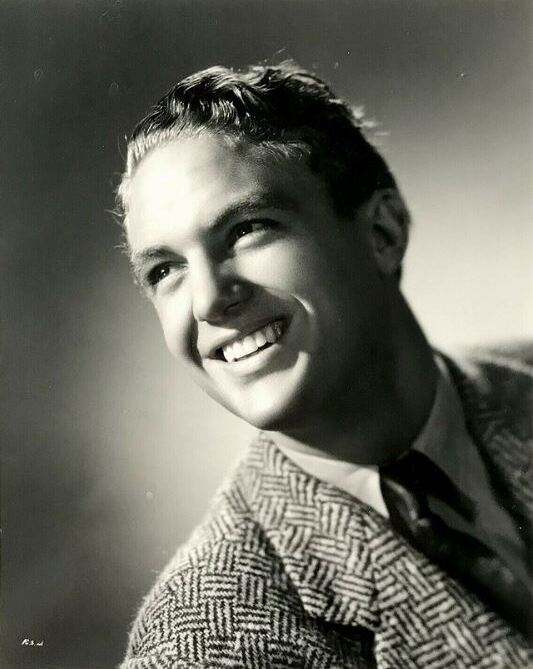
Stack, c. 1940

United Artists borrowed him to play a Polish Air Force pilot in To Be or Not to Be (1942), alongside Jack Benny and Carole Lombard. Stack admitted he was terrified going into this role, but he credited Lombard, whom he had known personally for several years, with giving him many tips on acting and with being his mentor. Lombard was killed in a plane crash shortly before the film was released. Stack played another pilot in Eagle Squadron (1942), a huge hit. He then made a Western, Men of Texas (1942). During World War II, Stack served as an officer in the United States Navy. He worked as an aerial gunnery instructor and rose to the rank of lieutenant.

Stack resumed his career after the war with roles in such films as Fighter Squadron (1948) at Warner Bros. with Edmond O'Brien, playing a pilot; A Date with Judy (1948) at MGM, with Wallace Beery and Elizabeth Taylor. He made two films at Paramount: Miss Tatlock's Millions (1948) and Mr. Music (1950). He had an excellent role in Bullfighter and the Lady (1951), a passion project of Budd Boetticher for John Wayne's company. He later said this was the first time he liked himself on screen.

Stack supported Mickey Rooney in My Outlaw Brother (1951) and had the lead in the adventure epic Bwana Devil (1952), considered the first color, American 3-D feature film. It was released by United Artists, which also put Stack in a Western, War Paint (1953). He continued making similar low-budget action fare: Conquest of Cochise (1953) for Sam Katzman; Sabre Jet (1953), playing another pilot, this time in the Korean War; The Iron Glove (1954), a swashbuckler where Stack played Charles Wogan, for Katzman.

Stack was back in "A" pictures when he appeared opposite John Wayne in The High and the Mighty (1954), playing the pilot of an airliner who comes apart under stress after the airliner encounters engine trouble. The film was a hit, and Stack received good reviews. In 1954, he signed a seven-year contract with Fox. Sam Fuller cast him in the lead of House of Bamboo (1955), shot in Japan for 20th Century Fox. He supported Jennifer Jones in Good Morning, Miss Dove (1955), also at Fox, and starred in Great Day in the Morning (1956) at RKO, directed by Jacques Tourneur.

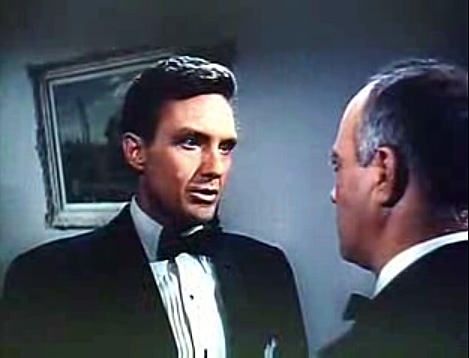
Stack in Written on the Wind (1956)

Stack was then given a role in Written on the Wind (1956), directed by Douglas Sirk and produced by Albert Zugsmith. Stack played another pilot, the son of a rich man who marries Lauren Bacall, who in turn falls for his best friend, played by Rock Hudson. The film was a massive success and Stack was nominated for an Academy Award for Best Supporting Actor; Dorothy Malone, who played Stack's sister, was nominated for Best Supporting Actress. Malone won, but Stack lost, to Anthony Quinn. Stack felt that the primary reason he lost to Quinn was that 20th Century Fox, which had lent him to Universal-International, organized block voting against him to prevent one of their contract players from winning an Academy Award while working at another studio. Stack was reunited with Hudson, Malone, Zugsmith, and Sirk on The Tarnished Angels (1957), once more playing a pilot. At Fox, he was in The Gift of Love (1958) with Bacall. Stack then was given a real star role, playing the title part in John Farrow's biopic, John Paul Jones (1959). Despite a large budget and an appearance by Bette Davis, it was not a success.

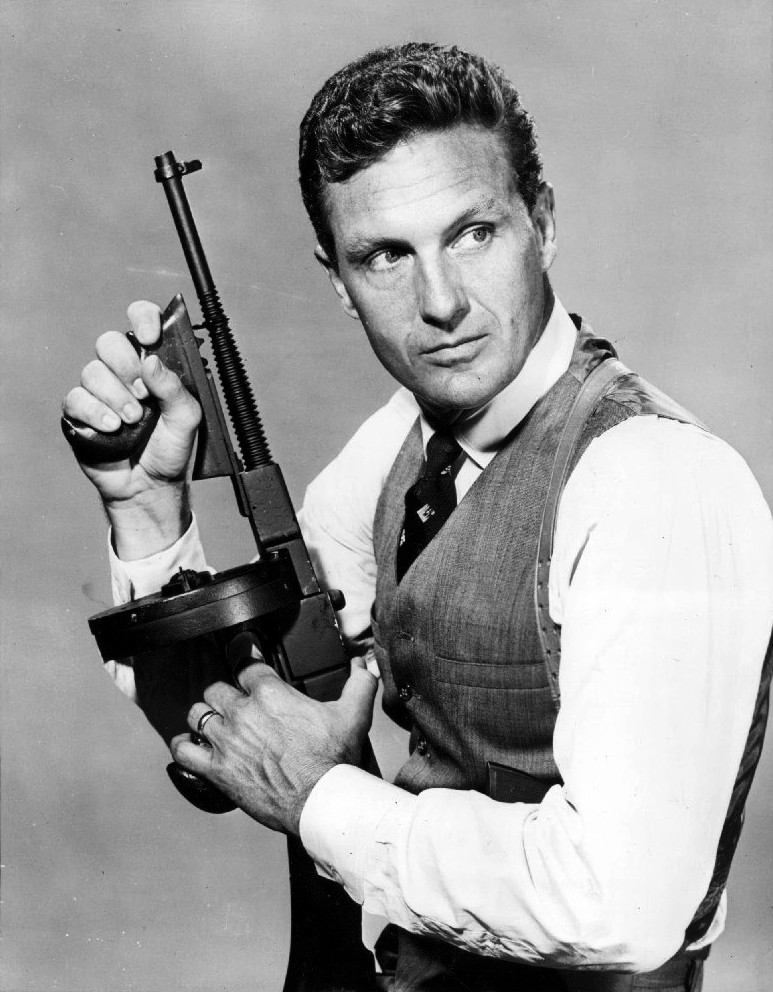
Stack portraying prohibition agent Eliot Ness in the series The Untouchables (1959)

Stack portrayed the crimefighting Eliot Ness in the ABC television drama series The Untouchables (1959–1963) produced by Desilu Productions, in association with Stack's Langford Productions. The show portrayed the ongoing battle between gangsters and a special squad of federal agents in prohibition-era Chicago. "No one thought it was going to be a series," Stack once said, "When you tell the same story every week, it seemed like a vendetta between Ness and the Italians." The show won Stack the Primetime Emmy Award for Outstanding Lead Actor in a Drama Series at the 12th Primetime Emmy Awards in 1960.

During the series' run, Stack starred in a disaster film, The Last Voyage (1960), appearing opposite Malone. At Fox, he was in The Caretakers (1963) with Joan Crawford and he appeared in a special on hunting, The American Sportsman. He owned 25% of The Untouchables and The Caretaker. Stack worked in Europe for Is Paris Burning? (1966), The Peking Medallion (1967), Action Man (1967), and Story of a Woman (1970). He also appeared in Laura (1967).

Stack starred in a new drama series, rotating the lead with Tony Franciosa and Gene Barry in the lavish The Name of the Game (1968–1971). He played a former federal agent turned true-crime journalist, evoking memories of his role as Ness. In 1971, he sued CBS for $25 million for appearing in the documentary The Selling of the Pentagon, saying that the company had falsely portrayed him as doing propaganda to sell the Vietnam War, while in fact he'd been opposed from the start.

Stack played a pilot in the TV film Murder on Flight 502 (1975) and was the lead in the series Most Wanted (1976), playing a tough, incorruptible police captain commanding an elite squad of special investigators, also evoking the Ness role. He later played a similar role in the series Strike Force (1981). He also starred in a French film, Second Wind, in 1978.

Stack at the 60th Academy Awards in 1988

Stack parodied his own persona in the comedy 1941 (1979). His performance was well received and Stack became a comic actor, appearing in Airplane! (1980), Big Trouble (1986), Plain Clothes (1988), Caddyshack II (1988), Joe Versus the Volcano (1990), Beavis and Butt-Head Do America (1996), and BASEketball (1998). He also provided the voice for the character Ultra Magnus in The Transformers: The Movie (1986). In a more serious vein, he appeared in the action film Uncommon Valor (1983), the television miniseries George Washington (1984), and Hollywood Wives (1985), and appeared in several episodes of the primetime soap opera Falcon Crest in 1986. Stack's series Strike Force was scheduled opposite Falcon Crest, where it quickly folded.

He began hosting Unsolved Mysteries in 1987. He thought very highly of the interactive nature of the show, saying that it created a "symbiotic" relationship between viewer and program, and that the hotline was a great crime-solving tool. Unsolved Mysteries aired from 1987 to 2002, first as specials in 1987 (Stack did not host all the specials, which were previously hosted by Raymond Burr and Karl Malden), then as a regular series on NBC (1988–1997), then on CBS (1997–1999) and Lifetime (2001–2002). Stack served as the show's host during its entire original series run.

In 1991, Stack voiced the main police officer Lt. Littleboy (who is also the main protagonist and narrator) in The Real Story of Baa Baa Black Sheep. In 1996, a Golden Palm Star on the Palm Springs, California, Walk of Stars was dedicated to him.

== Personal life and death ==
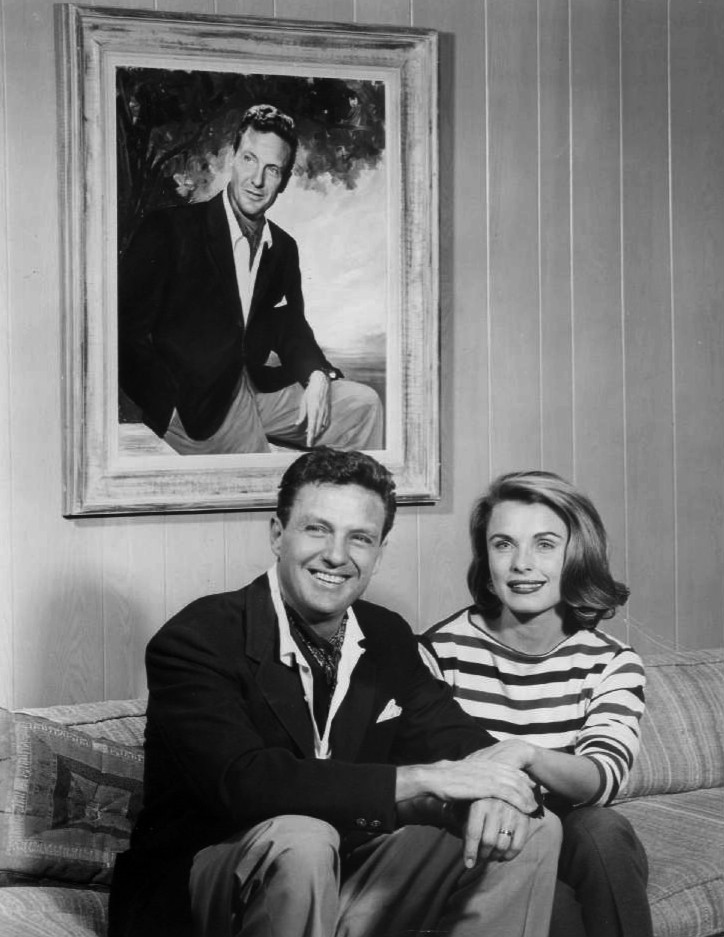
Robert and Rosemarie Stack in 1961

Stack was married to actress Rosemarie Bowe from 1956 until his death. They had two children, a son, Charles, and a daughter, Elizabeth.

He was a Republican.

He underwent radiation therapy for prostate cancer in October 2002, and died of heart failure at his home in Bel Air, Los Angeles, on May 14, 2003, at the age of 84.

== Filmography ==
=== Film ===
Year	Title	Role	Notes
1939	First Love	Ted Drake	
1940	The Mortal Storm	Otto Von Rohn	
1940	A Little Bit of Heaven	Bob Terry	
1941	Nice Girl?	Don Webb	
1941	Badlands of Dakota	Jim Holliday	
1942	To Be or Not to Be	Lieutenant Stanislav Sobinski	
1942	Eagle Squadron	Chuck S. Brewer	
1942	Men of Texas	Barry Conovan	
1948	A Date with Judy	Stephen I. Andrews	
1948	Fighter Squadron	Captain Stuart L. Hamilton	
1948	Miss Tatlock's Millions	Nickey Van Alen	
1950	Mr. Music	Jefferson 'Jeff' Blake	
1951	Bullfighter and the Lady	Johnny Regan	
1951	My Outlaw Brother	Patrick O'Moore	
1952	Bwana Devil	Bob Hayward	
1953	War Paint	Lieutenant Billings	
1953	Conquest of Cochise	Major Tom Burke	
1953	Sabre Jet	Colonel Gil Manton	
1954	The Iron Glove	Captain Charles Wogan	
1954	The High and the Mighty	Captain John Sullivan	
1955	House of Bamboo	Eddie Kenner	
1955	Good Morning, Miss Dove	Dr. Tommy Baker	
1956	Great Day in the Morning	Owen Pentecost	
1956	Written on the Wind	Kyle Hadley	Nominated – Academy Award for Best Supporting Actor
1957	The Tarnished Angels	Roger Shumann	
1958	The Gift of Love	Bill Beck	
1959	John Paul Jones	John Paul Jones	
1960	The Last Voyage	Cliff Henderson	
1963	The Caretakers	Dr. Donovan MacLeod	
1966	Is Paris Burning?	Brigadier General Edwin L. Sibert	
1967	Sail to Glory	Narrator	
1967	The Peking Medallion	Cliff Wilder	
1967	Action Man	Jim Beckley	
1970	Story of a Woman	David Frasier	
1978	Second Wind	François Davis	
1979	1941	Major General Joseph W. Stilwell	
1980	Airplane!	Captain Rex Kramer	
1983	Uncommon Valor	Harry MacGregor	
1986	Big Trouble	Winslow	
1986	The Transformers: The Movie	Ultra Magnus	Voice
1987	Plain Clothes	Mr. Gardner	
1988	Caddyshack II	Chandler Young	
1988	Dangerous Curves	Louis Faciano	
1990	Joe Versus the Volcano	Dr. Ellison	
1996	Beavis and Butt-Head Do America	ATF Agent Flemming	Voice
1998	BASEketball	Himself	
1999	Hercules: Zero to Hero	Narrator	Voice
1999	Mumford	Himself	
2001	Recess: School's Out	Superintendent	Voice
2001	Killer Bud	The Gooch	

=== Television ===
Year	Title	Role	Notes
1951	Pulitzer Prize Playhouse	Unknown	Episode: "Broken Dishes"
1955	The 20th Century Fox Hour	Mark MacPherson	Episode: "A Portrait of Murder"
1956	Producers' Showcase	Unknown	Episode: "The Lords Don't Play Favorites"
1959–1963	The Untouchables	Eliot Ness	119 episodes Primetime Emmy Award for Outstanding Lead Actor in a Drama Series (1960)
1964	Bob Hope Presents the Chrysler Theatre	Major Morgan	Episode: "The Command"
1965	Memorandum for a Spy	James Andrew Congers	Television film
1967	Sail to Glory	Narrator	Television film
1968	Laura	Mark McPherson	Television film
1968–1971	The Name of the Game	Dan Farrell	26 episodes
1974	The Strange and Deadly Occurrence	Michael Rhodes	Television film
1975	The Honorable Sam Houston	Sam Houston	Television film
1975	Adventures of the Queen	Captain James Morgan	Television film
1975	Murder on Flight 502	Captain Larkin	Television film
1976	Police Story	Sergeant Dave Stoddard	Episodes: "Odyssey of Death"
1976–1977	Most Wanted	Captain Lincoln "Linc" Evers	23 episodes
1978	The Adventurous Rangers of the Jungle	Charles Cross	Television film
1979	The Muppets Go Hollywood	Himself	Television special
1979	Undercover with the KKK	Narrator	Television film
1980	The Love Boat	Bret Garrett	Episode: "The Horse Lover/Secretary to the Stars/Julie's Decision/Gopher and Isaac Buy a Horse/Village People Ride Again"
1981–1982	Strike Force	Captain Frank Murphy	20 episodes
1984	Hotel	Lewis Blackwood	Episode: "The Wedding"
1984	George Washington	General Stark	3 episodes Television miniseries
1985	Brothers	Russell Maltby	Episode: "Donald's Dad"
1985	Hotel	Charles Vandoor	Episode: "New Beginnings"
1985	Hollywood Wives	George Lancaster	3 episodes, Television miniseries
1985	Midas Valley	Drew Hammond	Television film
1986	Murder, She Wrote	Chester Harrison	Episode: "Christopher Bundy – Died on Sunday"
1987	Falcon Crest	Roland Saunders	5 episodes
1987–2002	Unsolved Mysteries	Host	292 episodes
1987	Perry Mason: The Case of the Sinister Spirit	Jordan White	Television film
1987	Korea: The Forgotten War	Narrator	Television film
1990	The Fanelli Boys	Kyle Hadley	Episode: "A Very Fanelli Christmas"
1991	The Real Story of...	Lt. Littleboy / Narrator	Voice, episode: "Baa Baa Black Sheep"
1991	The Return of Eliot Ness	Eliot Ness	Television film
1993	Blossom	Robert Stack	Episode: "Sitcom"
1995	The Pinocchio Shop	George Washington	Episode: "Patriots and Apples"
1996	JAG	TV Host	Episode: "Sightings"
1997	Diagnosis Murder	Peter McReynolds	Episode: "Open and Shut"
1998–1999	Hercules	Bob the Narrator	Voice, 30 episodes
1999	Recess	General	Voice, episode: "A Genius Among Us"
1999	Sealed with a Kiss	Sumner Ethridge	Television film
2000	Star Trek: Voyager	Eliot Ness	Episode: "Memorial"
2000	The Lords of the Mafia	Himself	Documentary
2000	The Angry Beavers	Narrator	Voice, episode: "Home Loners"
2000	H.U.D.	Deep Throat Man	Television film
2001–2003	Butt-Ugly Martians	Stoat Muldoon	Voice, main role
2001	King of the Hill	Reynolds Penland	Voice, episode: "The Trouble with Gribbles"; uncredited
2002	Teamo Supremo	Gordon / The Silver Shield	Voice, episode: "The Grandfather Show"

== Radio appearances ==
Year	Program	Episode/source
1953	Family Theater	The Indispensable Man
1950	Lux Radio Theatre	Mr Belvedere Goes To College

== Books ==
- Straight Shooting (with Mark Evans) (1980); ISBN 0-02-613320-2
- Shotgun Digest (Jack Lewis, Editor) (1974); ISBN 978-0695804978

== See also ==
- William H. Perry (Los Angeles), his great-grandfather
