= Murder on Flight 502 =

1975 American television film by George McCowan

- Title card
- Genre: Drama; Mystery; Thriller
- Written by: David P. Harmon
- Directed by: George McCowan
- Starring: Robert Stack; Sonny Bono; Farrah Fawcett-Majors
- Music by: Laurence Rosenthal
- Country of origin: United States
- Original language: English

Production
- Executive producers: Leonard Goldberg; Aaron Spelling
- Producer: David Chasman
- Cinematography: Archie R. Dalzell
- Editor: Allan Jacobs
- Running time: 97 minutes
- Production company: Spelling-Goldberg Productions

Original release
- Network: ABC
- Release: November 21, 1975

Murder on Flight 502 is a 1975 American made-for-television drama mystery thriller film directed by George McCowan. The film stars Robert Stack, Sonny Bono, and Farrah Fawcett-Majors, along with an all-star ensemble television cast in supporting roles. It was inspired by the success of the Airport films.

== Plot ==
TOA airlines flight 502 takes off from New York City to London. At the airport, a bomb threat in the airline's first-class passenger lounge turns out to be an elaborate prank. Safety official Davenport receives a letter explaining that a series of murders will take place on Flight 502 before it lands.

Davenport and his team go over the backgrounds of all the passengers to find possible suspects. At first, teenaged passenger Millard Kensington is suspected because he has a history with the airline as a known prankster. Although the teenager admits he did place the fake bomb in the passenger lobby, he is clueless about the letter.

Suspicion next focuses on passenger Otto Gruenwaldt, who blames fellow passenger Dr. Kenyon Walker for failing to save Gruenwaldt's dying wife. Gruenwaldt suffers a heart attack on board and Dr. Walker rushes to aid the dying man. Dr. Walker injects Gruenwaldt with a life-saving drug. Captain Larkin demands Walker surrender the used syringe, implying it may be needed as evidence. Walker refuses.

A break in the investigation comes when a priest on board is revealed as an imposter and a known thief. Detective Myerson looks for the priest, but finds him dead in the dumbwaiter. At this point, the threatening letter's contents are revealed to the passengers. Soon, a second murder occurs; flight attendant Vera Franklin is found dead by the co-pilot.

Concerned that he may be at risk, passenger Paul Barons confesses to Myerson that he committed the bank robbery, and that the priest and Franklin were both involved in smuggling the money out of the country on the aircraft. Barons says he is the next target. Myerson agrees and pulls out a gun, proving he is the killer, having snapped when Barons escaped justice for his crime after no proof was found.

Myerson takes the passengers hostage and explains he murdered the priest and looked through the luggage of the crew and found the money in Franklin's bag. Captain Larkin makes a drastic move to distract Myerson by releasing the oxygen masks and going for the gun. In the ensuing struggle, Barons is killed, the cabin catches on fire, and Myerson is badly burned. The passengers extinguish the fire just as the crisis ends.

On the ground, flight attendant White expresses her gratitude for Larkin saving the passengers, but Larkin reveals White as the smuggler of the stolen money. He explains how, before the aircraft took off, Franklin had dropped her bag, which had no money inside. Therefore, the money was put in the bag by the real guilty smuggler, Karen White.

Larkin accompanies Myerson down an escalator to hand him off to the waiting British police. Myerson attempts to justify his actions, claiming he will be commended for protecting the people from criminals because he brought a thief to justice when the law would not. Captain Larkin looks on as Myerson is led off by officers.

== Cast ==
Principal cast listed alphabetically:

- Ralph Bellamy as Dr. Kenyon Walker
- Polly Bergen as Mona Briarly
- Theodore Bikel as Otto Gruenwaldt
- Sonny Bono as Jack Marshall
- Dane Clark as Ray Garwood
- Laraine Day as Claire Garwood
- Fernando Lamas as Paul Barons
- George Maharis as Robert Davenport
- Farrah Fawcett-Majors as Karen White
- Hugh O'Brian as Detective Daniel Myerson
- Molly Picon as Ida Goldman
- Walter Pidgeon as Charlie Parkins
- Robert Stack as Captain Larkin
- Brooke Adams as Vera Franklin
- Danny Bonaduce as Millard Kensington
- Vincent Baggetta as Fred Connors
- Rosemarie Stack as Dorothy Saunders
- Elizabeth Stack as Marilyn Stonehurst (Note: Elizabeth Stack was Robert and Rosemarie's daughter; she acts under the name: Elizabeth Wood Stack.)
- Steve Franken as Donald Goldman
- Philip Sterling as Benny Cummings
- Pepper Martin as Bomb Man
- Yolanda Galardo as Alice Quincy
- Bob Hachman as Operations Man
- Don Hanmer as Priest
- Glorie Haufman as Ticket Taker
- Byron Morrow as Diplomat
- George O. Petrie as Ferguson
- Dave Shelley as Harold

== Production ==
Robert Stack, then mainly shooting in Europe, was still a television icon and was in demand for the movie-of-the-week features that were common in the 1970s. In later interviews, Stack revealed that one of the prime incentives to sign on for Murder on Flight 502 was the opportunity to work with his wife Rosemarie and daughter Elizabeth.

== Reception ==
The Los Angeles Times called it "an ill-begotten 'Son of Airport' that never gets off the ground, having been fogged in by trite dialogue and cliche characterisations."

Reviewer Keith Bailey considered Murder on Flight 502 typical of the 1970s disaster film. "The '70s was [sic] the era of the 90-minute (including commercials) TV movie, unlike this one; had this movie been cut down to fit a 90-minute slot, I am sure it would have been a definite improvement." Bailey considered the film did not work as a murder mystery, but could have worked as a character study.

=== Ratings ===
It was the 10th-highest rated show of the week from November 17–23.

== See also ==
- List of American films of 1975
