= Young Fury =

1965 film by Christian Nyby

- Theatrical release poster
- Directed by: Christian Nyby
- Screenplay by: Steve Fisher
- Story by: Steve Fisher; A. C. Lyles
- Produced by: A. C. Lyles
- Starring: Rory Calhoun; Virginia Mayo; William Bendix; Lon Chaney Jr. Richard Arlen; John Agar
- Cinematography: Haskell B. Boggs
- Edited by: Marvin Coil
- Music by: Paul Dunlap
- Production company: A.C. Lyles Productions
- Distributed by: Paramount Pictures
- Release date: February 1965
- Running time: 80 minutes
- Country: United States
- Language: English

Young Fury is a 1965 American Western film directed by Christian Nyby and written by Steve Fisher. The film stars Rory Calhoun, Virginia Mayo, William Bendix, Lon Chaney Jr., Richard Arlen and John Agar. The film was released in February 1965, by Paramount Pictures. This was William Bendix's final film role, as he died in December 1964, two months before its release.

== Plot ==
Pursued by the Dawson gang, Clint McCoy returns to his old hometown for the first time in many years. He left long ago after the infidelity of wife Sara, leaving her and their infant son Tige behind.

Tige is now a teenager. He believes his mother to be dead and hates his father for deserting them. When he comes to town with his teenage gang (the Hellion gang), Tige encounters the saloonkeeper, Sara, but doesn't realize that she is his mother.

Calling his own father out for a gunfight, Tige does not get the better of him, but Clint refuses to kill him. More than half of Tige's gang leave town before the Dawson gang arrive. One of Tige's gang acts as lookout for Clint, signalling to him when the Dawsons arrive. The Dawsons then shoot the lookout. Tige then sits in the saloon to watch the Dawsons do away with Clint, but when Sara gets a rifle to go and help Clint she addresses Tige as her son and then goes outside, where she is mortally wounded. As she is dying, Sara explains who she is and why her father left. Tige then joins his father against the Dawsons.

== Cast ==
- Rory Calhoun as Clint McCoy
- Virginia Mayo as Sara McCoy
- William Bendix as Joe, The Blacksmith
- Lon Chaney Jr. as Ace, The Bartender
- Richard Arlen as Sheriff Jenkins
- John Agar as Dawson
- Preston Pierce as Tige McCoy
- Linda Foster as Sally Miller
- Robert Biheller as Biff Dane
- Jody McCrea as Stone
- Merry Anders as Alice
- Marc Cavell as Pancho
- Jerry Summers as Gabbo
- Jay Ripley as "Slim"
- Kevin O'Neal as Curley
- Dal Jenkins as Sam
- Fred Alexander as "Pony"
- Rex Bell Jr. as Farmer
- Joan Huntington as Kathy
- Regis Parton as Deputy Willie
- William Wellman Jr. as Peters
- Steve Condit as Tim
- Sailor Vincent as The Merchant
- Jorge Moreno as The Mexican
- Bill Clark as Brady
- Dave Dunlop as Smith
- Jesse Wayne as Member of The Hellion Gang
- Bob Miles as Member of The Hellion Gang
- Eddie Hice as Member of The Hellion Gang
- Fred Krone as Member of The Hellion Gang
- Joe Finnegan as Member of The Hellion Gang
- Kent Hays as Member of The Hellion Gang

== See also ==
- List of American films of 1965
