= The Price of Fear (1956 film) =

1956 film by Abner Biberman

- Theatrical release poster
- Directed by: Abner Biberman
- Screenplay by: Dick Irving Hyland
- Story by: Robert Tallman
- Produced by: Howard Christie
- Starring: Merle Oberon; Lex Barker; Charles Drake; Gia Scala
- Cinematography: Irving Glassberg
- Edited by: Ray Snyder
- Color process: Black and white
- Production company: Universal Pictures
- Distributed by: Universal Pictures
- Release date: March 13, 1956
- Running time: 79 minutes
- Country: United States
- Language: English

The Price of Fear is a 1956 American film noir crime film directed by Abner Biberman and starring Merle Oberon, Lex Barker, Charles Drake and Gia Scala. It was produced and distributed by Universal Pictures.

== Plot ==
David Barrett, the co-owner of a dog-track, discovers that his partner, Lou Belden, has sold out to gangster Frankie Edare, who plans to get rid of Barrett and take sole control of the enterprise. Barrett confronts and threatens Lou at the Intermezzo Club.

Around the same time, an inebriated businesswoman named Jessica Warren accidentally runs down an elderly man named Ferranti while driving. Extremely upset, she drives away from the scene and calls the police from a service station.

Barrett is riding a taxi when he notices that a car in pursuit and asks the driver to stop so that he may flee on foot. He sees Jessica's car at the service station, jumps in it and drives away. Seeing this, Jessica tells police that her car has been stolen and does not report the hit-and-run incident.

Back at the Intermezzo, Lou is gunned down by Edare's men. The next morning, newspaper headlines scream that Barrett is being sought for the murder. Barrett's friend detective Pete Carroll tells his lieutenant that he is sure that Barrett is not the culprit. The lieutenant has witnesses who heard Barrett threaten Lou and a pawnbroker who claims that Barrett had bought a shotgun from him the previous evening. Carroll learns that the car that Barrett stole has been linked to the hit and run.

Carroll tells Barrett that the timing of the hit and run clears him of the murder. Barrett recognizes he has been double-framed but understands that, while Ferranti is alive, the hit-and-run charge is preferable to that of murder. Jessica comes to the station to tell her story, rife with details seemingly cementing Barrett's guilt, and he is held for grand theft auto and told that, should Ferranti die, Barrett will be charged with manslaughter. Jessica does not admit her involvement. Out on bail, Barrett visits Jessica to tell her that he knows that her story is untrue. The two begin a romantic relationship.

The district attorney charges Barrett with murder instead of the hit and run. Carroll tells Jessica that he is suspicious of her. Barrett asks her directly if she did it, and she says no. He tells her that his alibi is McNab, the cabbie, although to be cleared of the hit and run puts him in line for a murder charge. Jessica worries that the police will then pursue her.

When Jessica inquires about McNab, the taxi company boss notices her initials on her purse and later phones Edare, who then confronts Jessica outside her apartment after realizing that she had committed the hit and run.

At her apartment, Jessica ostensibly receives flowers from Dave, but the box contains the shotgun used to kill Lou. Carroll and Barrett take the weapon to the pawnbroker, who now insists he does not know who bought it from him. He then indicates that the two men should "look in the back" of the store, where Edare's man Vince, assigned to keep an eye on the pawnbroker, is aware of what is going on and escapes from the rear exit. Edare phones Jessica to say that Barrett has been cleared of the murder, now they must find McNab and keep him quiet; she tells him she will handle it. Vince is assigned to tail her because Edare knows she will lead them to the cabbie.

Barrett locates an address for McNab. When he calls to share this with Jessica, she insists she accompany him there to be of help. Mrs. McNab tells them her husband is out of town, or "on a drunk." Jessica surreptitiously slips the woman $1,000 and a note telling her to say nothing to Barrett. When the couple leave, McNab comes out of the bedroom.

Upon returning home, Barrett finds Ferranti's daughter, Nina, waiting. She tells him her father has died; she does not believe him when he says he can prove he did not do it, she declares she will see him punished. McNab's conscience is bothering him so, when his wife leaves their apartment to buy him liquor, he phones Barrett. Before he can discuss anything, Vince enters and murders McNab. Edare drops in on Jessica to inform her that she is now in the clear. When Barrett comes by and begins telling Jessica about having gone to McNab's place and finding him dead, she slips up, revealing that she already knew. She then tells Barrett about Edare's intimidation of her, although she exaggerates. Mrs. McNab shows up, exposes Jessica's bribery, then establishes a bribe of her own by suggesting Jessica help fill the income gap that exists now that her husband is dead.

After the woman goes, Jessica tells Barrett she loves him. After a few moments, she admits what Barrett knows, that she is responsible for the hit and run. She asks him to stay with her, and they share a romantic interlude; however, when she refuses to go to the police with the truth, he says he will give her until noon the next day to turn herself in, and leaves. Nina Ferranti comes to Barrett's apartment to apologize; she offers to help him. He divulges that he knows who killed her father but will not talk about it "until tomorrow". At that point, Jessica phones, begging for a day or two more because she is leaving the country. She has written a full confession but cannot face the consequences; she gives him details concerning the train she will be taking.

Barrett heads to the train station; Nina follows him there, then phones Carroll saying she is aware that Barrett and Jessica are "running away together". On board the moving train, Jessica shows Barrett her confession and seemingly agrees to get off at the first stop in order to go to the police. They decide to go to the club car for a drink, but Jessica misdirects Barrett and they end up in the baggage car, where Edare and Vince are waiting. Edare explains that Barrett is going to "meet the southbound train" scheduled to pass theirs after the first stop. Jessica claims she had no choice, she "made one mistake" and panic set into motion circumstances she was too weak to prevent.

At the first stop, Vince unexpectedly must pretend to be the baggage man. During this distraction, Barrett overpowers Edare, but the two criminals quickly regain control, knocking Barrett out. Carroll manages to get on board and has the conductor help him search. A woman passenger comes along to complain she hears her dog continuously barking in the baggage car. The conductor calls the car, then tells Carroll that the voice was not that of the regular baggage man. As Edare and Vince are dragging Barrett toward the open door, he struggles free; Carroll enters and shoots Edare. Jessica throws herself in front of the southbound train.

== Cast ==
- Merle Oberon as Jessica Warren
- Lex Barker as David Barrett
- Charles Drake as Pete Carroll
- Gia Scala as Nina Ferranti
- Warren Stevens as Frankie Edare
- Phillip Pine as Vince Burton
- Mary Field as Ruth McNab
- Dan Riss as Jim Walsh
- Konstantin Shayne as Bolasny
- Stafford Repp as Johnny McNab
- Tim Sullivan as Lou Belden
- Abner Biberman as a Pathologist

== See also ==
- List of American films of 1956

== Bibliography ==
- Spicer, Andrew. Historical Dictionary of Film Noir. Scarecrow Press, 2010.
