= Jet Attack =

1958 film by Edward L. Cahn

- Theatrical poster
- Directed by: Edward L. Cahn
- Written by: Orville H. Hampton (screenplay); Mark Hanna (story)
- Produced by: Alex Gordon
- Starring: John Agar; Audrey Totter; Gregory Walcott
- Cinematography: Frederick E. West
- Edited by: Robert S. Eisen
- Music by: Ronald Stein
- Production company: Catalina Productions
- Distributed by: AIP
- Release date: February 1958
- Running time: 69 min.
- Country: United States
- Language: English

Jet Attack (also known as Jet Alert and released in the UK as Through Hell to Glory) is a 1958 American aviation war film set in the Korean War, featuring United States Air Force (USAF) aircraft.

American International Pictures released Jet Attack as a double feature with Suicide Battalion.

== Plot ==
During the Korean War, scientist Dean Olmstead (Joseph Hamilton) designs a long-range radio transmitting and tracking device for the United States Air Force. During testing of the device, Capt. Tom Arnett (John Agar), leading an escort of North American F-86 Sabre jet fighters, is unable to prevent Olmstead's North American B-25 Mitchell bomber being shot down in North Korea. His commanding officer, Col. Catlett (George Cisar) plans a rescue of the scientist, whom he believes is still alive and may be undergoing interrogation by Soviet intelligence agents working with the North Koreans.

Arnett and Lt. Bill Clairborn (Gregory Walcott) are assigned to go into North Korea and bring back Olmstead. After parachuting behind enemy lines, they meet up with guerrilla leader Capt. Chon (Victor Sen Yung), who takes them to Tanya Nikova (Audrey Totter), a Russian nurse, who has been working as a spy for the guerrillas. Tanya had previously been romantically involved with Arnett, but proves invaluable to the mission. She knows that the scientist may be under care of her boss, Col. Kuban (Robert Carricart), a Russian doctor. After they discover Olmstead's whereabouts and bring him out of the prison camp where he was being treated for a concussion, the group is pursued by North Korean Maj. Wan (Leonard Strong). Tanya is wounded during the escape but manages to drive the Americans to an airfield. She dies, but the two American pilots and the scientist make good their escape in a pair of North Korean MiG-15 jet fighters. However Clairborn deliberately crashes his plane into an attacking Korean fighter being unable to discover how to fire the Mig's guns.

== Cast ==
- John Agar as Capt. Tom Arnett
- Audrey Totter as Tanya Nikova
- Gregory Walcott as Lt. Bill Clairborn
- James Dobson as Lt. Sandy Wilkerson
- Leonard Strong as Maj. Wan
- Nicky Blair as Radioman Chick Lane
- Victor Sen Yung as Capt. Chon
- Joseph Hamilton as Dean Olmstead
- Guy Prescott as Maj. Garver
- George Cisar as Col. Catlett
- Stella Lynn as Muju
- Robert Carricart as Col. Kuban

== Production ==
Jet Attack relied heavily on "stock war footage and studio shots". The mismatched footage led to unintended continuity errors. (Note: In the film, during the attack scene, a North American B-25 Mitchell bomber turns into a Martin B-26 Marauder.) California Air National Guard North American F-86A Sabres from the 196th Fighter Interceptor Squadron stood in for both USAF and North Korean fighters.

== Reception ==
The film was included in the 1978 book, The Fifty Worst Films of All Time (and How They Got That Way), by Harry Medved, Randy Dreyfuss, and Michael Medved. Like many other films of the period that were set in the Korean War, film historian Michael Paris considered it another of the "... features that had little to say that was new; most simply reprised situations common from earlier films and were a blatant attempt to profit from public interest in the war."

== See also ==
- List of American films of 1958
