= Man of Conflict =

1953 film

- Directed by: Hal R. Makelim
- Written by: Hal Richards
- Starring: Edward Arnold; John Agar
- Cinematography: Harold E. Stine
- Edited by: Hal R. Makelim Productions
- Distributed by: Atlas Pictures; Monarch Film Corporation (UK)
- Release date: November 4, 1953
- Running time: 72 minutes
- Country: United States
- Language: English

Man of Conflict is a 1953 American crime drama film directed by Hal R. Makelim and starring John Agar and Edward Arnold.

== Plot ==
Industrial giant J. R. Compton and his partner son Ray clash over J. R.'s treatment of employees in the company's plants. J. R.'s rise to success has taken his sense of fairness, and Ray must show his father how to conduct his affairs with respect for the men who work for them.

== Cast ==
- Edward Arnold as J. R. Compton
- John Agar as Ray Compton
- Susan Morrow as Jane Jenks
- Fay Roope as Ed Jenks
- Herbert Heyes as Evans
- Dorothy Patrick as Betty
- Bob Carson as Official
- Russell Hicks as Murdock
- John Hamilton as Cornwall
- Lovyss Bradley as Miss Garner
