= John Agar =

American actor (1921–2002)

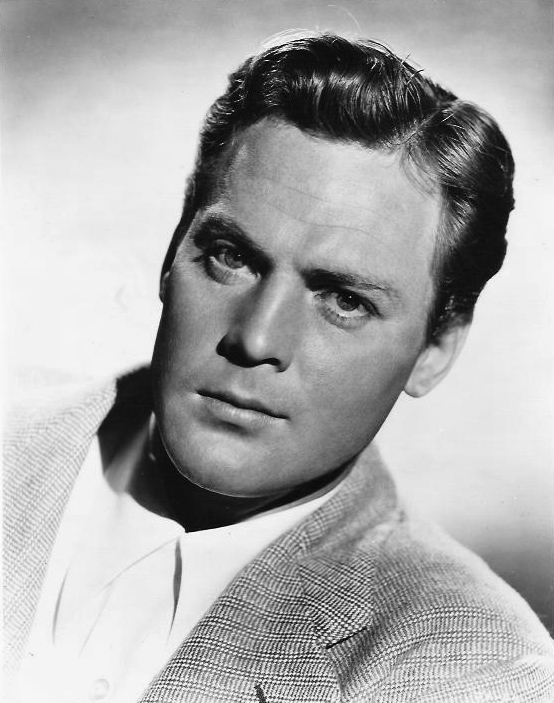
- Agar, c. 1960
- Born: John George Agar Jr. January 31, 1921; Chicago, Illinois, U.S.
- Died: April 7, 2002 (aged 81); Burbank, California, U.S.
- Resting place: Riverside National Cemetery
- Occupation: Actor
- Years active: 1948–2001
- Spouses: Shirley Temple (m. 1945; div. 1950) Loretta Combs (m. 1951; died 2000)
- Children: 3

John George Agar Jr. (January 31, 1921 – April 7, 2002) was an American film and television actor. He is best known for starring alongside John Wayne in the films Sands of Iwo Jima, Fort Apache, and She Wore a Yellow Ribbon. In his later career he was the star of B movies, such as Tarantula!, The Mole People, The Brain from Planet Arous, Revenge of the Creature, Flesh and the Spur and Hand of Death. He was the first husband of Shirley Temple.

Agar's career suffered in the wake of his divorce with Temple, but he developed a niche playing leading men in low-budget science fiction, Western, and horror movies in the 1950s and 1960s. John Wayne gave him several supporting roles in the late 1960s and early 1970s. In later years he worked extensively in television.

== Early life ==
Agar was born in Chicago, Illinois, the son of Lillian (née Rogers) and John George Agar, a meat packer. His great aunt was Edna Gladney. He was educated at the Harvard School for Boys in Chicago and Lake Forest Academy in Lake Forest, Illinois. He graduated from Trinity-Pawling Preparatory School in Pawling, New York, but did not attend college. He and his family moved from Chicago to Los Angeles in 1942, after his father's death.

In 1941, Agar joined the U.S. Navy Air Corps, had basic training in Texas, and instructed in physical training at March Field in Riverside, California. He was medically discharged from the Navy in 1943 due to an ear infection that affected his balance. He then enlisted in the U.S. Army Air Corps. He was a sergeant and a physical training instructor when he left the USAAF in 1946.

== Career ==
Agar met Shirley Temple in 1943 when he was asked to escort her to a Hollywood party.

After his marriage with Temple in 1945, her boss at the time, David O. Selznick, signed Agar to a five-year acting contract starting at $150 a week, including acting lessons. Agar made his film debut as Temple's love interest in Fort Apache (1948), a John Ford western for RKO starring John Wayne and Henry Fonda. It was a financial and critical success.

Agar was reunited with Temple for his second film, a suffragette drama Adventure in Baltimore (1949), also for RKO, which was a huge flop.

RKO used him in The Woman on Pier 13 (1950), an anti-communist drama that was a pet project of Howard Hughes. It was Agar's first movie without Temple, and he was billed after Robert Ryan and Laraine Day. It was another flop.

More successful was a reunion with Wayne and Ford, She Wore a Yellow Ribbon (1949), in which Agar played the romantic lead. It was a sizeable hit and has come to be regarded as a classic. Even more popular was the World War II film Sands of Iwo Jima (1949) where Agar supported John Wayne. Made by Republic Pictures, it was a sizeable hit, earning Wayne an Oscar nomination and getting Agar some good reviews. Toward the end of his life, Agar blamed John Wayne for getting him hooked on cigarettes and alcohol, two addictive habits that would later ruin his life.

Warner Bros put Agar in a war film, Breakthrough (1950) which relied extensively on pre-existing war footage. It was a reasonable success at the box office.

Warner Bros used him in Along the Great Divide (1951), supporting Kirk Douglas. He made a low budget Arabian Knights film for Sam Katzman with Lucille Ball, The Magic Carpet (1951).

In 1952 Agar was fired by Selznick for driving under the influence of alcohol, which affected his career with the large studios in Hollywood.

Agar was third billed in Woman of the North Country (1952), a Western for Republic, and also starred in Man of Conflict (1953), an independent drama with Edward Arnold.

Agar had support roles in Bait (1954), a Hugo Haas drama with Cleo Moore; The Rocket Man (1954), a Charles Coburn comedy co-written by Lenny Bruce; and Shield for Murder (1954), a film noir starring and co-directed by Edmond O'Brien.

Agar returned to leading roles in The Golden Mistress (1954), an adventure film directed by Abner Biberman.

In 1954 Agar signed a seven-year contract with Universal. He began the association with Revenge of the Creature (1955), the popular first sequel to Creature from the Black Lagoon (1954); it was produced by William Alland and directed by Jack Arnold. He was borrowed by Lippert Pictures for The Lonesome Trail (1955), then, at Universal, made a second film for Haas with Cleo Moore, Hold Back Tomorrow (1955).

Agar made another science fiction film, Tarantula! (1955), made by Alland and Arnold, which was popular and became a cult favorite.

Universal starred him in a Western, Star in the Dust (1956) with Mamie Van Doren and Richard Boone and produced by Albert Zugsmith. A new company, American International Pictures, borrowed Agar for a Western, Flesh and the Spur (1956) with Marla English and Mike Connors (billed as "Touch Connors"). Then he went back to Universal for The Mole People (1956), produced by Alland.

His contract with Universal ended when he complained that he was tired of only doing science fiction roles. His final film with the studio was supporting Universal's Western star Audie Murphy in a comedy Joe Butterfly (1957).

He remained in demand for low budget science fiction, horror and Western films. He starred in The Daughter of Dr. Jekyll (1957) for Edgar G. Ulmer at Allied Artists, then made The Brain from Planet Arous (1957) for Howco International.

Agar starred in some low budget Westerns for Lippert's low budget Regal Films at Fox, Ride a Violent Mile (1958) and Frontier Gun (1958). He went to the Philippines to make Cavalry Command costarring Myron Healey (1958) and did two for AIP, Jet Attack (1958) and Attack of the Puppet People (1958). He shot a television pilot in 1958 that was released as a feature film Destination Space (1959).

He did Invisible Invaders (1958) for director Edward L. Cahn who had made Jet Attack.

Agar could be seen in Journey to the Seventh Planet (1962) and Of Love and Desire (1963). He joined he ensemble casts in several low budget films for producer A.C. Lyles that were released by Paramount Pictures; The Young and The Brave (1963) with Rory Calhoun, Law of the Lawless (1963) starring Dale Robertson and William Bendix, Stage to Thunder Rock (1965) with Barry Sullivan and Marilyn Maxwell, Young Fury (1965) with Rory Calhoun and Lon Chaney Jr., Johnny Reno (1966) with Dana Andrews and Jane Russell, and Waco (1966) with Howard Keel, Jane Russell and Brian Donlevy.

He made some films for Larry Buchanan at AIP that were originally meant as made-for-television-movies, Curse of the Swamp Creature (1966), Zontar, the Thing from Venus (1966) and Hell Raiders (1968). He had the lead in Women of the Prehistoric Planet (1966) and Night Fright (1967).

He had small parts in some studio films like The St. Valentine's Day Massacre (1967) with Jason Robards Jr. and Ralph Meeker, and three more pictures in a row with John Wayne: The Undefeated (1969), Chisum (1970), and Big Jake (1971).

His last prominent roles were small parts in King Kong (1976), Miracle Mile (1988) and Nightbreed (1990).

== Personal life ==
=== Marriages ===
Agar's sister was a schoolmate of Shirley Temple. In 1944 Agar escorted Temple to a party held by David O. Selznick. The two were married in 1945. Agar and Temple had a daughter together, Linda Susan Agar, born 1948 (who was later known as Susan Black, taking the surname of her stepfather, Charles Alden Black). However, the marriage foundered, in part because of Agar's drinking (he had been arrested for drunk driving) and in part because of pressures of their high public profile. Temple sued for divorce on the grounds of mental cruelty in 1949. The two were divorced on December 7, 1950. After the divorce, Agar had little contact with his daughter or with Temple.

Agar married model Loretta Barnett Combs (1922–2000) in 1951. They tried to elope but officials refused to marry them for an hour because Agar had been drinking. They remained married for 49 years until her death in 2000. They had two sons, Martin Agar and John G. Agar III.

=== Legal issues ===
In 1950 Agar was fined for reckless driving. In 1951 he was sentenced to five months in jail for drunk driving, and released on probation after 60 days. In 1953 Agar was again arrested for drunk driving, and sentenced to 120 days in prison. In 1960 he was again arrested for drunk driving.

=== Political views ===
Agar supported Barry Goldwater in the 1964 United States presidential election, and Ronald Reagan in 1980.

=== Premature obituary ===
Agar was drinking at his friend and filmmaker Ed Wood's apartment one day in the late 1960s when the afternoon news program erroneously announced Agar's obituary. Wood called the studio and told them: "He's alive... he's sitting right here with me now!" The story was corrected shortly thereafter.

== Death ==
Agar died on April 7, 2002, in Burbank, California from severe complications from emphysema, after being confined for months to an iron lung. He was 81.

== Legacy ==
As for being associated with science fiction B movies, Agar said, "I don't resent being identified with B science fiction movies at all." Agar later said, "Why should I? Even though they were not considered top-of-the-line, for those people that like sci-fi, I guess they were fun. My whole feeling about working as an actor is, if I give anybody any enjoyment, I'm doing my job, and that's what counts."

John Agar has been referenced in multiple songs by various rock bands. Frank Zappa mentions Mr. Agar in the song "The Radio is Broken" from the 1983 album The Man From Utopia. The Seattle band The Young Fresh Fellows recorded the songs "The New John Agar" and "Agar's Revenge" on the Topsy Turvy album in 1985.

John Agar is also mentioned by lesser-known bands such as The Underpeople (Zontar, The Thing from Venus) and The Dead Elvi (John Agar Rules).

The television series Mystery Science Theater 3000 has featured several of Agar's films, including The Mole People, Women of the Prehistoric Planet and Revenge of the Creature.

== Filmography ==
=== Film ===
Year	Title	Role	Notes
1948	Fort Apache	2nd Lt. Michael Shannon O'Rourke	
1949	Adventure in Baltimore	Tom Wade	
1949	She Wore a Yellow Ribbon	Lt. Flint Cohill	
1949	The Woman on Pier 13	Don Lowry	
1949	Sands of Iwo Jima	Professor Peter Conway	
1950	Breakthrough	Lt. Joe Mallory	
1951	Along the Great Divide	Billy Shear	
1951	The Magic Carpet	Abdullah al Husan / Dr. Ramoth / The Scarlet Falcon	
1952	Woman of the North Country	David Powell	
1953	Man of Conflict	Ray Compton	
1954	Bait	Ray Brighton	
1954	The Rocket Man	Tom Baxter	
1954	Shield for Murder	Mark Brewster	
1954	The Golden Mistress	Bill Buchanan	
1955	Revenge of the Creature	Professor Clete Ferguson	
1955	The Lonesome Trail	Johnny Rush	
1955	Tarantula!	Dr. Matt Hastings	
1955	Hold Back Tomorrow	Joe Cardos	
1956	Star in the Dust	Sheriff Bill Jorden	
1956	Flesh and the Spur	Luke Random / Matt Random	
1956	The Mole People	Dr. Roger Bentley	
1957	Joe Butterfly	Sergeant Dick Mason	
1957	The Daughter of Dr. Jekyll	George Hastings	
1957	The Brain from Planet Arous	Steve March	
1957	Ride a Violent Mile	Jeff Donner	
1958	The Day of the Trumpet	Sgt. Judd Norcutt	
1958	Jet Attack	Capt. Tom Arnett	
1958	Attack of the Puppet People	Bob Westley	
1958	Frontier Gun	Sheriff Jim Crayle	
1959	Invisible Invaders	Maj. Bruce Jay	
1960	Raymie	Ike	
1961	Fall Girl	Joe McElroy	
1962	Journey to the Seventh Planet	Capt. Don Graham	
1962	Hand of Death	Alex Marsh	
1963	The Young and the Brave	Intelligence Captain	
1963	Of Love and Desire	Gus Cole	
1964	Law of the Lawless	Pete Stone	
1964	Stage to Thunder Rock	Dan Carrouthers	
1964	Young Fury	Dawson	
1966	Johnny Reno	Ed Tomkins	
1966	Women of the Prehistoric Planet	Dr. Farrell	
1966	Waco	George Gates	
1967	The St. Valentine's Day Massacre	Dion O'Bannion	
1967	Night Fright	Sheriff Clint Crawford	
1969	The Undefeated	Christian	
1970	Chisum	Amos Patton	
1971	Big Jake	Bert Ryan	
1971	How's Your Love Life?	Police Lt. Rafferty	
1976	King Kong	City Official	
1978	Mr. No Legs	Police Capt. Hathaway	
1982	Divided We Fall	Yankee Officer	Short film
1988	Perfect Victims	Neighbor Walking His Dog	
1988	Miracle Mile	Ivan Peters	
1990	Nightbreed	Decker's Victim	
1990	Fear	Leonard Scott Levy	
1992	Invasion of Privacy	Old Convict	direct-to-video
2001	The Vampire Hunters Club	Reggie	direct-to-video short film
2005	The Naked Monster	Dr. Clete Ferguson	

=== Television ===
Year	Title	Role	Notes
1952	Hollywood Opening Night		Episode: "Delaying Action"
1952	The Unexpected	Alan Liveright	Episode: "Desert Honeymoon"
1952–1954	Fireside Theatre	John Cushing	2 episodes
1953	The Ford Television Theatre		Episode: "The Old Man's Bride"
1953	The Loretta Young Show	Lloyd	Episode: "Earthquake"
1954	Schlitz Playhouse of Stars	Otis Tack	Episode: "Little War at San Dede"
1954–1957	General Electric Theater	Marvin Potter	2 episodes
1955	Climax!	Larry Dorrant	Episode: "The First and the Last"
1958	The Gale Storm Show: Oh! Susanna	Lt. Arnold Van Dyke	Episode: "Diamonds Are a Girl's Best Friend"
1958	Flight		Episode: "Vertijet"
1959	Perry Mason	Kenneth Baxter	Episode: "The Case of the Caretaker's Cat"; credited as John G. Agar
1959	Destination Space	Col. Matthews	TV movie
1959	Rawhide	Lon Grant	S2:E7, "Incident at the Buffalo Smokehouse"
1960	Rawhide	Mike Anderson	S3:E5, "Incident of the Slavemaster"
1960	Whirlybirds	Danny Flynn	Episode: "Four Little Indians"
1961	The Best of the Post	Lt. Larry Bronsford	Episode: "Band of Brothers"
1961	Bat Masterson	Sam Phelps	Episode: "Farmer with a Badge"
1961	Ripcord	Warrant Officer Frank Pierson	Episode: "Chuting Stars"
1962	Lawman	Jim Martin	Episode: "The Witness"
1963	Death Valley Days	Dr. Charles Edwards	Episode: "Pioneer Doctor"
1964–1968	The Virginian	Joe Williams / Tom Anders	2 episodes
1965	Branded	The Sheriff	Episode: "$10,000 for Durango"
1966	Combat!	Capt. Thorpe	Episode: "The Mockingbird"
1967	Family Affair	Gabe	Episode: "What Did You Do in the West, Uncle?"
1967	Hondo	Frank James	Episode: "Hondo and the Judas"
1967	Zontar: The Thing from Venus	Dr. Curt Taylor	TV movie
1968	Curse of the Swamp Creature	Barry Rogers	TV movie
1968	The Name of the Game	Bert Walker	Episode: "Nightmare"
1969	Hell Raiders	Maj. Ronald Paxton	TV movie
1971	The Smith Family	Jim Thorne	Episode: "Taste of Fear"
1972	The Delphi Bureau		Episode: "The Man Upstairs-The Man Downstairs Project"
1974	Chase		Episode: "Remote Control"
1976	Police Story	Hammack	Episode: "The Long Ball"
1976	Charlie's Angels	Col. Blaylock	Episode: "Target: Angels"
1984	Highway to Heaven	Morton Clay	Episode: "The Return of the Masked Rider"
1986	The Twilight Zone	Pop	Episode: "A Day in Beaumont"
1991	The Perfect Bride	Gramps	TV movie
1993	Body Bags	Dr. Lang	TV movie; in the section "Eye"

=== Video games ===
Year	Title	Role	Notes
1996	The Pandora Directive	Thomas Malloy	
