= Adventure in Baltimore =

1949 film by Richard Wallace

- Theatrical release poster
- Directed by: Richard Wallace; James Anderson (assistant)
- Written by: Lionel Houser (writer); Christopher Isherwood (story)
- Produced by: Richard H. Berger; Dore Schary
- Starring: Robert Young; Shirley Temple; John Agar
- Cinematography: Robert De Grasse
- Edited by: Robert Swink
- Music by: Friedrich Hollaender
- Production company: RKO Radio Pictures
- Distributed by: RKO Radio Pictures
- Release date: April 19, 1949
- Running time: 89 minutes
- Country: United States
- Language: English

Adventure in Baltimore is a 1949 American drama film directed by Richard Wallace and starring Robert Young and Shirley Temple. Dinah Sheldon (Shirley Temple) is a student at an exclusive girls' school who starts campaigning for women's rights. Her minister father (Robert Young) and her boyfriend Tom Wade (John Agar) do not approve.

== Plot ==
In 1905, Dinah Sheldon, an enthusiastic art student, is expelled from Miss Ingram's Seminary for wearing two petticoats instead of five, attending political rallies and insisting that she be allowed to study nudes. When she is sent home to Baltimore, Dinah's understanding father, Dr. Andrew Sheldon, an Episcopalian pastor, easily forgives his headstrong daughter this latest calamity, but her mother Lily encourages her to be more conventionally feminine. Dinah's childhood sweetheart, Tom Wade, also believes that she should settle down and confesses that, since her absence, he has begun dating the more "continental" Bernice Eckert.

Dinah feigns indifference to Bernice, telling Tom that her only ambition is to study art in Paris, and he agrees to help her fulfill her dream. When Dinah is arrested during a brawl in a public park, which starts after four loafers begin arguing over one of her paintings, the overworked Tom is asked to provide bail for all five. Out of gratitude, Dinah offers to write a speech for Tom on equality, which he is scheduled to deliver the next night at the Forum Society's Spring Dance. While preparing the speech, which is a modified version of one of her own debates, Dinah learns that her exit from jail was witnessed by two women, who then relayed the information to Dan Fletcher, Andrew's Scottish vestryman. Dan is upset by the scandal because Andrew has just become a candidate for the new bishop's post, and suggests that he punish Dinah.

Instead, the less ambitious Andrew encourages Dinah's dreams by confessing that, as a youth, he had a short career as a ballroom dancer but gave it up to protect his father's reputation. That night, Dinah shows up late at the Forum Society, and Tom is forced to read her speech cold. He is shocked to discover that her "equality" topic is female emancipation and is laughed at by the large crowd.

The humiliated Tom dotes on Bernice and informs Dinah that he no longer wants to be seen with her. Aware of Tom's rejection, Andrew offers to be Dinah's partner in a waltz contest, and father and daughter easily defeat Tom and Bernice. Later, Dinah visits Tom at the automobile garage where he works as a mechanic and begs him to pose for a portrait she intends to enter in a competition called "Spirit of Labor." Although Tom at first refuses to help, Dinah soon talks him into posing by promising to disguise his face in the finished painting. She then dresses him in a bathing suit and hammer and paints his likeness in the seclusion of the family greenhouse. Dinah enters the painting in the contest anonymously, but because Tom's face is clearly identifiable, her identity is soon surmised. In addition, because she painted Tom as half undressed, her reputation is called into question, and Andrew, who has been nominated to the bishop's job, is suddenly embroiled in yet another scandal.

Tom is then fired from his job and dumped by a jealous Bernice. Pressured by Lily and Dan, Andrew reluctantly agrees to send Dinah to her aunt in Pittsburgh until his promotion is assured. Tom, meanwhile, finds himself hotly defending Dinah's honor to Bernice, and as the contrite Dinah is about to leave for the train station, he insists on riding with her in the family carriage. On the way there, a suffrage parade is harassed by a group of jeering men, and Dinah and Lily come to the women's rescue, causing a small riot. Just as a regretful Andrew is about to rush to the station to bring Dinah home, he learns of the incident and bails his family and Tom out of jail. The next day in church, Andrew tells Dan he has been "ruminating" about his future and delivers a critical, impromptu sermon on tolerance to his congregation. Andrew's stand moves his family to tears, and just as Tom finally confesses his love to Dinah, Andrew learns that he has been made bishop.

== Cast ==
- Robert Young as Pastor Andrew Sheldon
- Shirley Temple as Dinah Sheldon
- John Agar as Tom Wade
- Albert Sharpe as Dan Fletcher
- Josephine Hutchinson as Mrs. Lilly Sheldon
- Charles Kemper as Mr. Steuben
- Johnny Sands as Gene Sheldon
- John Miljan as Mr. Eckert
- Norma Varden as Helen Hadley Hamilton
- Carol Brannon as Bernice Eckert (as Carol Brannan)
- Charles Smith as Fred Beehouse
- Josephine Whittell as Mrs. Eckert
- Patti Brady as Sis Sheldon
- Gregory Marshall as Mark Sheldon
- Patsy Creighton as Sally Wilson

== Reception ==
The film recorded a loss of $875,000.
