= Along the Great Divide =

1951 film directed by Raoul Walsh

- Theatrical release poster
- Directed by: Raoul Walsh
- Written by: Walter Doniger; Lewis Meltzer
- Produced by: Anthony Veiller
- Starring: Kirk Douglas; Virginia Mayo; John Agar; Walter Brennan
- Cinematography: Sidney Hickox
- Edited by: Thomas Reilly
- Music by: David Buttolph
- Distributed by: Warner Bros.
- Release date: June 16, 1951 (New York)
- Running time: 88 minutes
- Country: United States
- Language: English
- Box office: $1.4 million (US rentals)

Along the Great Divide is a 1951 American Western thriller film directed by Raoul Walsh and starring Kirk Douglas, Virginia Mayo, John Agar and Walter Brennan. It was Douglas's first of many Western films.

== Plot ==
Federal marshal Len Merrick and two deputies rescue cattle rustler Tim "Pop" Keith from a lynch mob headed by rancher Ned Roden, whose eldest son has been fatally shot in the back. Roden believes that the perpetrator was Pop, but Merrick insists on taking him to Santa Loma to stand trial. Others in the mob accede to Merrick's decision, but Roden vows to administer his own kind of justice. He sends his other son Dan to gather his ranch hands while he attends to the burial. Merrick offers help but is met with hostility. After Roden leaves, Merrick discovers a pocket watch near the dead body.

Pop suggests that the group spend the night at his nearby cabin. Merrick accepts but regrets his decision when Pop's daughter Ann ambushes them. Merrick disarms her from behind. Ann later accompanies them to Santa Loma. To evade Roden and his ranch hands, Merrick follows an unexpected desert route to determine whether he is being trailed. The tactic fails and the party is overtaken by Roden's gang. In the ensuing gunfight, Merrick's deputy and close friend Billy Shear is wounded. Merrick forces Roden into a stalemate by capturing his son Dan. As they travel forward, Billy dies.

Merrick and Ann find a mutual attraction, and Merrick reveals to her that his strict sense of duty stems from a time when he had ignored it. That lapse, his failure to take his job seriously, cost his father's life. Ann sympathizes but warns him of her strong loyalty to Pop.

Dan bribes Merrick's other deputy Lou Gray to help him escape. When they reach a poisoned waterhole, a disagreement ensues. All but Merrick want to head to a river half a day to the south, but Merrick insists on Santa Loma. Gray draws his gun, but Merrick shoots it from his hand, and he now has three prisoners to manage. After two days without sleep, Merrick drops from his horse. Pop grabs his gun but is unwilling to shoot. When Gray tries to reach his rifle, Pop kills him and hands the gun to Merrick.

Back in Santa Loma, Pop is tried for murder. Merrick tries to convince the jury of Pop's innocence, but all of the evidence and witnesses are against him, and the result is a guilty verdict. Just before Pop is to be hanged, Merrick notices the watch that he had found near the body of Roden's dead son and sees that it bears an inscription to Dan. Confronted with proof that it was he who had killed his brother, Dan draws his revolver and grabs Ann as a shield. When Roden approaches him, Dan shoots and kills him. He then races into a barn, where a gunfight with Merrick ensues. From the barn's loft, Dan jumps onto the back of a horse to attempt escape, but he is shot in the back.

== Cast ==
- Kirk Douglas as Marshal Len Merrick
- Virginia Mayo as Ann Keith
- John Agar as Deputy Billy Shear
- Walter Brennan as Tim "Pop" Keith
- Ray Teal as Deputy Lou Gray
- Hugh Sanders as Sam Weaver
- Morris Ankrum as Ned Roden
- James Anderson as Dan Roden
- Charles Meredith as Judge Marlowe

== Reception ==
In a contemporary review for The New York Times, critic Bosley Crowther called the film a "solemn sagebrush saga" and wrote: "In the end the prisoner is delivered and all comes out right as rain. Not so for Mr. Douglas, however. His appearance in a western role, riding horses and twirling six-shooters, is just a little shy of absurd. And Virginia Mayo's clawin' and jawin' as the spitfire is in that region, too. ... [T]he best they've accomplished is a routine western, second grade."
