= Big Trouble (1986 film) =

Comedy by John Cassavetes

- Theatrical release poster
- Directed by: John Cassavetes
- Written by: Warren Bogle
- Produced by: Mike Lobell
- Starring: Peter Falk; Alan Arkin; Beverly D'Angelo; Charles Durning
- Cinematography: Bill Butler
- Edited by: Donn Cambern; Ralph E. Winters
- Music by: Bill Conti
- Production company: Delphi III Productions
- Distributed by: Columbia Pictures
- Release date: May 30, 1986
- Running time: 93 minutes
- Country: United States
- Language: English

Big Trouble is a 1986 American comedy film and the last film directed by John Cassavetes. The cast reunites Peter Falk and Alan Arkin, co-stars of The In-Laws, and also features Beverly D'Angelo, Charles Durning and Valerie Curtin.

The film's plot was so similar to that of Double Indemnity that, prior to production, Columbia Pictures requested Universal Pictures (rightsholder for the Paramount film Double Indemnity) to grant permission to reuse the plot of the earlier film. Universal executive Frank Price, who had previously worked at Columbia, was aware that Columbia was holding on to a script called Back to the Future and made a deal which enabled Universal to take over the ownership of that script.

== Plot ==
Leonard Hoffman is a Los Angeles insurance agent with a problem on his hands. He has teenage triplets who are all gifted musicians but wife Arlene insists that the kids attend college at Yale, requiring more than $40,000 in tuition, which would be a good deal more than the nearby UCLA.

This situation is on Leonard's mind when he pays a business call to the Beverly Hills mansion of Steve and Blanche Rickey. He is met by a flirtatious and scantily clad Blanche, who explains a problem of her own: Steve is dying, with less than a week to live, but has inadvertently allowed his life insurance policy to lapse.

A scheme is hatched involving a policy with a double-indemnity clause, but for this to work, Steve will need to die in an unexpected fashion; will he or won't he co-operate?

== Cast ==
- Peter Falk as Steve Rickey
- Alan Arkin as Leonard Hoffman
- Beverly D'Angelo as Blanche Rickey
- Charles Durning as O'Mara
- Robert Stack as Winslow
- Paul Dooley as Noozel
- Valerie Curtin as Arlene Hoffman
- Richard Libertini as Dr. Lopez
- Steve Alterman as Peter Hoffman
- Jerry Pavlon as Michael Hoffman
- Paul La Greca as Joshua Hoffman
- John Finnegan as Det. Murphy
- Karl Lukas as Police Captain
- Maryedith Burrell as Gail
- Edith Fields as Doris
- Rosemarie Stack as Mrs. Winslow
- Barbara Tarbuck as Helen
- Warren Munson as Jack
- Al White as Mr. Williams
- Teddy Wilson as Porter
- Gloria Gifford as Wanda
- Herb Armstrong as Night Security Guard
- Jaime Sánchez as Chief Terrorist

== Production ==
Andrew Bergman wrote the original screenplay and was slated to direct before Cassavetes was hired. Cassavetes disliked the film and called it "the aptly titled Big Trouble,'" as the studio vetoed many of his decisions and he disagreed with the manner in which the studio edited the film. Bergman said: "That was a mess. I never fixed the ending, and that was the problem. You’ve got to have it when you get it on the floor. You can’t say, 'Later, we’ll get it straight.' It’s true in every medium. You’ve got to hit the ground running, and we didn’t. I never had the ending straight.". As a result, Bergman requested to be billed as Warren Bogle on the finished film.

== Reception ==
The film had a polarizing response; on Rotten Tomatoes, the film has a "Rotten" rating of 14% based on 7 reviews. On the other hand, on Metacritic, the film has a rating of 70 out of 100 based on 8 reviews, indicating "generally favorable" reviews. Vincent Canby of The New York Times gave the film a positive review, praising the actors and their chemistry, describing it as "a most cheering, sweetly demented salute to Billy Wilder's ''Double Indemnity,'' the 1944 film-noir classic with Fred MacMurray and Barbara Stanwyck in the Arkin and D'Angelo roles...", and writing that the film "even when the gags don't work, displays a level of comic intelligence that's very rare in any movies these days." Kevin Thomas of The Los Angeles Times was also positive, praising Cassavetes's direction, writing: "[Cassavetes] played by the rules here, yet as straightforward a comedy as “Big Trouble” is, his extraordinary rapport with actors and his spontaneity, especially with a quick, casual close-up, comes through."
