= Anthony Call =

American television actor

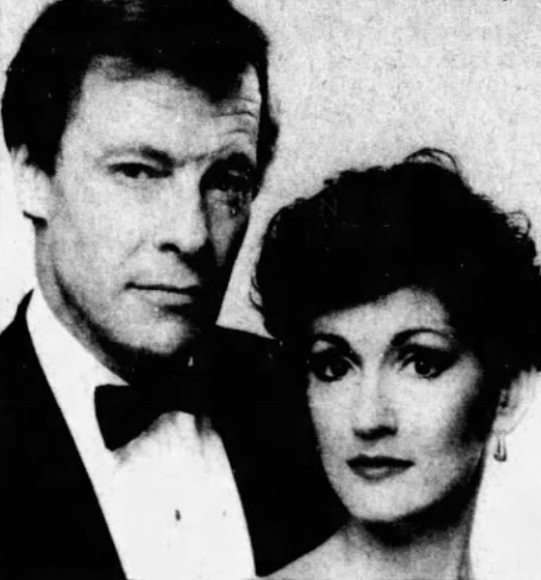
- Call (left) with Robin Strasser, 1981
- Born: August 31, 1940 (age 86); Los Angeles, California, U.S.
- Education: University of Pennsylvania
- Occupations: Film and television actor
- Years active: 1961–present
- Parent: Abner Biberman (father)

Anthony Call (born August 31, 1940) is an American television actor. He is best known for playing Herb Callison in the American soap opera television series One Life to Live from 1979 to 1991.

== Life and career ==
Call was born in Los Angeles, California, the son of Abner Biberman, an actor. He attended the University of Pennsylvania, where he studied to be a classical pianist.

Call began his career in 1960, appearing in the crime drama television series Route 66. The next year, he made an appearance in the television programs Outlaws and The Dick Powell Theatre.

Call guest-starred in numerous television programs including Gunsmoke, Bonanza, The Dakotas, The Twilight Zone, The Alfred Hitchcock Hour, 77 Sunset Strip, The Fugitive, The Virginian, Star Trek and Combat!. In addition to his guest-starring appearances, he portrayed senator Colin Whitney in The Edge of Night from 1970 to 1971, Dr. Joe Werner on Guiding Light from 1972 to 1976, and Herb Callison on One Life to Live from 1979 to 1991.

== TV and film roles ==
Year	Title	Role	Notes / Ref.
1960	Route 66	Frank Palmer	Episode: "Three Sides"
1961	Outlaw	Willie	Episode: "The Daltons Must Die: Part 1"
1961	The Dick Powell Theatre	Eddie	Episode: "John J. Diggs"
1963	The Twilight Zone	Lee Helmsman	Episode: "The Thirty-Fathom Grave"
1963	Sam Benedict	Intern	Episode: "Green Room, Grey Morning"
1963	The Dakotas	Lou Warren	Episode: "Trial at Grand Forks"
1963	77 Sunset Strip	Toby McGill	Episode: "Reunion at Balboa"
1963	Temple Houston	Conch Chevenix	Episode: "The Twisted Rope"
1963	The Alfred Hitchcox Hour	Earl	"Blood Bargain"
1965	The Fugitive	Phil Andrews	Episode: "Fun and Games and Party Favors"
1965	Profiles in Courage	Charles Burleigh	Episode: "Prudence Crandall"
1965	Bonanza	Billy Davis	Episode: "The Dilemma"
1966	Star Trek: The Original Series	Navigator Dave Bailey	Episode: "The Corbomite Maneuver"
1967	Gunsmoke	Pell	Episode: "Muley"
1968	The Virginian	Val Tussey	Episode: "The Gentle Tamers"
1969	The Virginian	Jase Dubbins	Episode: "Home to Methuselah"
1970	The People Next Door	Dr. Lauren	Film
1970-1971	The Edge of Night	Senator Colin Whitney	24 episodes
1972-1976	Guiding Light	Dr. Joseph "Joe" Werner	1,271 episodes
1977-1978	Lovers and Friends	Dr. Fred Ballard	
1978	Going in Style	FBI Agent in Charge	Film
1979-1991	One Life to Live	Herb Callison	98 episodes
2001	The System: Escape from Death Row	Narrator	TV film
1998-2002	The FBI Files	Narrator	122 episodes
2003	Code of Silence	Narrator	TV Film
2003	Dangerous Company	Narrator	TV Film
2004	The Boys of H Company	Narrator	TV Film
2013-2022	A Haunting	Narrator, voice	59 episodes
2015	Secrets of the Dead	George Percy	Episode: "Jamestown's Dark Winter"
2015	Secrets of the Dead	Homer	Episode: "The Real Trojan Horse"
2017-2018	Murder Comes to Town	Narrator	13 episodes
2020-2023	Shock Docs	Narrator	8 episodes
