= Destination Space =

- DVD cover
- Written by: Rip Van Ronkel
- Directed by: Joseph Pevney
- Starring: Harry Townes; John Agar; Charles Aidman; Edward C. Platt
- Music by: Van Cleave
- Country of origin: United States
- Original language: English

Production
- Producer: Rip Van Ronkel
- Cinematography: Loyal Griggs
- Editor: Jerry Webb
- Running time: 51 minutes
- Production companies: Paramount Pictures, CBS

Original release
- Network: CBS
- Release: 1959

Destination Space is a 1959 American science fiction television film. It was produced and written by Rip Van Ronkel and directed by Joseph Pevney.

== Summary ==
James Benedict, the director of the United States space program, is in charge of operations aboard an American rotating wheel space station, the first of its kind. The imminent launch from the station of the first crewed lunar orbital spacecraft is aborted due to a meteor impact. Benedict testifies before a United States Senate committee, some of whose members believe that the construction of the station was an unnecessary expense which is delaying achievement of the Moon mission. An impartial observer, Dr. Kurt Easton, travels to the space station to observe operations as the crew prepares for the second attempt to launch the Moon mission. This launch is also aborted, however, when the lunar spacecraft's nuclear engine malfunctions due to ice buildup, necessitating rapid action by Dave Reynolds, the spacecraft's commander, to prevent an explosion. Meanwhile, Benedict, whose long-term romantic relationship has not yet led to marriage, finds himself to be one corner of a love quadrangle when Reynolds' wife reveals that she is in love with him.

== Cast ==
- Harry Townes: James Benedict
- John Agar: Matthews
- Charles Aidman: Dave Reynolds
- Whitney Blake: Jane Kramer
- Gail Kobe: Kim Reynolds
- Edward C. Platt: Kurt Easton

== Production history ==
According to science fiction scholar Gary Westfahl, "virtually no information [is] available about this film." Westfahl speculated that Destination Space, a joint production of Paramount Pictures and CBS, was actually a pilot for a prospective TV series about space travel, produced in competition with the pilot for Men into Space. According to Westfahl's theory, CBS chose the latter series, which debuted in 1959.

Rip Van Ronkel, the producer and writer of Destination Space, was the co-screenwriter of the 1950 science fiction film Destination Moon. Destination Space makes extensive use of stock footage from the 1955 Paramount science fiction film Conquest of Space.

== Reception ==
The Encyclopedia of Science Fiction found the movie to be weighed down by a forced romantic triangle and more talking than action; however, the movie had some positive points. The movie points out the extreme cost of space travel and strives for realism. The movie also notes the dangers of space travel as many missions have failed. In all, the Encyclopedia found the movie of interest.

== Home media ==
The movie was released in Region 1 in 2000.
