= Destry (TV series) =

Western television series

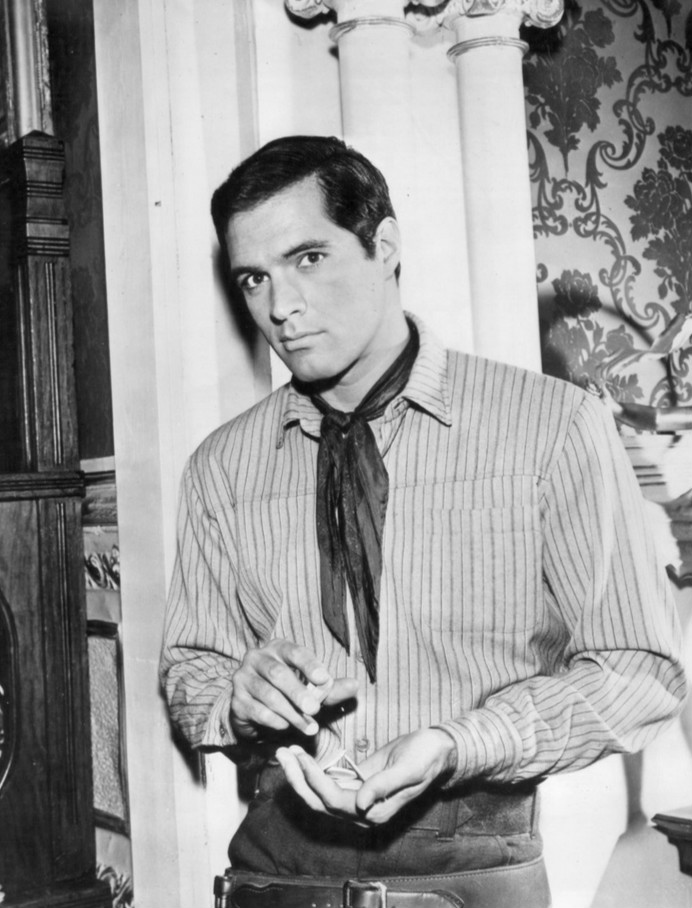
- Gavin as Harrison Destry.
- Based on: the character created by Max Brand
- Starring: John Gavin
- Theme music composer: Randy Sparks
- Opening theme: "Destry"; performed by The Ledbetters
- Composers: Jerry Goldsmith (three episodes); Cyril J. Mockridge (one episode); Morton Stevens (one episode)
- Country of origin: United States
- Original language: English
- No. of seasons: 1
- No. of episodes: 13

Production
- Producer: Frank Telford
- Running time: 60 minutes
- Production company: Revue Studios

Original release
- Network: ABC
- Release: February 14 – May 8, 1964

Destry is a Western television series starring John Gavin that originally aired on ABC from February 14 until May 8, 1964. Destry was based on the classic James Stewart Western, Destry Rides Again, and a subsequent remake, Destry, starring Audie Murphy. This series was a midseason replacement for 77 Sunset Strip.

== Premise ==
In the original films the main character is Tom Destry, a Western lawman who is expert with a gun but still prefers to use non-violent means to settle problems with outlaws. In the television series John Gavin portrays Harrison Destry, son of Tom, who had been a lawman until he was framed for a crime and jailed. Destry therefore follows Harrison after his release from prison as he wanders the West in search of the people who framed him.

As in the earlier feature films, many comedic situations arise as Destry goes to great lengths to avoid violence whenever troubles confront him. Gavin, in describing his character, stated, "To Destry, a hero is a man who thinks slower than a coward. While his father died with his boots on, Destry believes it is better to live with his boots on."

== Guest stars ==
- Chris Alcaide
- Robert Anderson
- John Astin
- Conlan Carter
- Bill Coontz
- Richard Devon
- Lawrence Dobkin
- Ken Drake
- Kelton Garwood
- Herman Hack
- Ron Hayes
- Myron Healey
- Warren J. Kemmerling
- George Keymas
- Norman Leavitt
- Ken Lynch
- Ken Mayer
- Roger Mobley
- Paul Newlan
- Richard Reeves
- Charles Seel
- Jack Tornek
- Lee Van Cleef
- Max Wagner
- Jesse Wayne

== Episodes ==
No. in season	Title	Directed by	Written by	Original release date
1	"The Solid Gold Girl"	Don Siegel	Robert Guy Barrows	February 14, 1964
2	"Destry Had a Little Lamb"	Gene Nelson	Gene L. Coon	February 21, 1964
3	"Law and Order Day"	John Florea	Marion Hargrove	February 28, 1964
4	"Stormy is a Lady"	Gene Nelson	Story by : Leo Townsend; Teleplay by : Gene L. Coon & Leo Townsend	March 6, 1964
5	"The Nicest Girl in Gomorrah"	Bernard Girard	Dave & Andy Lewis	March 13, 1964
6	"Big Deal at Little River"	Earl Bellamy	Clair Huffaker	March 20, 1964
7	"Go Away, Little Sheba"	Gene Nelson	Story by : Tom Seller; Teleplay by : Gene L. Coon	March 27, 1964
8	"Deputy for a Day"	William Witney	Clair Huffaker	April 3, 1964
9	"Ride to Rio Verde"	Frank Baur	Teleplay by : Roland Kibbee & Thomas Thompson; Based on a screenplay by : Ben Hecht & Charles Lederer; From the Novel Ride the Pink Horse by : Dorothy B. Hughes	April 10, 1964
10	"Blood Brother-in-Law"	Gene Nelson	Ken Kolb	April 17, 1964
11	"Red Brady's Kid"	Frank Baur	A. I. Bezzerides	April 24, 1964
12	"The Infernal Triangle"	Lamont Johnson	Clair Huffaker	May 1, 1964
13	"One Hundred Bibles"	Jesse Hibbs	Preston Wood	May 8, 1964

== Production ==
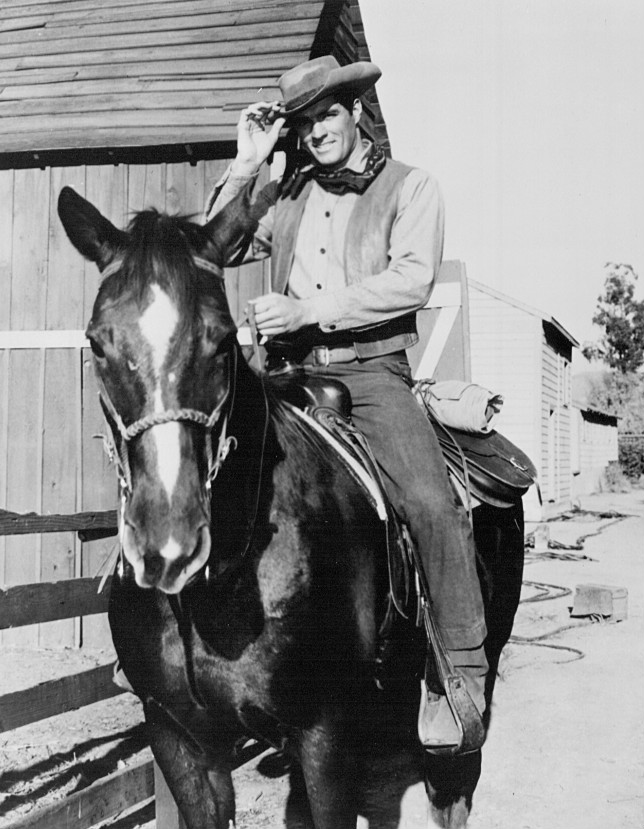

In October 1963, the Los Angeles Times reported that Destry would be rushed into production to use John Gavin. The new series was assigned the broadcast timeslot of the recently cancelled 77 Sunset Strip.

Some of the guest stars cast for Destry included Chris Alcaide, Med Flory, Ron Hayes, Roger Mobley, Susan Oliver, Stuart Randall, Barbara Stuart, and Olive Sturgess. Gavin in his role as the son of Tom Destry, was the fifth actor to play the character "Destry", following the film stars Tom Mix, James Stewart, Audie Murphy, and Joel McCrea. In a 1963 interview, Gavin described the character's personality and reflected on the role's importance within the context of his acting career:

When I came to Universal, they were making 40 pictures a year. I walked through the gate, was given a contract, and immediately the number of pictures dropped to eight or nine a year. I'm not complaining because I was given good roles... roles with scope and breadth. But I wish I could have been put in 40 or 50 roles before making my 'first' picture, do you know what I mean? Doing a series now is like putting the cart before the horse. I'm glad to be doing 'Destry' now though because of the experience. My gosh, I've shot more film in the last five weeks than I have in my entire life... It's a role I can play with a great deal of naivete. Destry is the sort of man who if he sees trouble will ride around it. He says the difference between a hero and a coward is that a coward can think faster.... Hopefully Destry is not always a fool or a clown. He's wandering the west for a few years and he's pretty wise, not brilliant or intelligent but he's been kicked in the head a few times and he knows what's going on.

== Reception ==
During the original broadcast of the series, the Los Angeles Times described Destry as "lacklustre...a routine, second-grade hoss opry", while The New York Times judged it to be the "pedestrian telling of an awkward adventure". Television audiences apparently agreed with those assessments, for Destry never attracted a sizable audience and was cancelled after just 13 episodes. Gavin blamed that lack of success, at least in part, to the departure of the network executive who had commissioned the show.

== Home media ==
On September 6, 2011, Timeless Media Group released Destry- The Complete Series on DVD in Region 1.
