= The Golden Mistress =

- Directed by: Abner Biberman
- Written by: Abner Biberman; Lee Hewitt
- Produced by: Sam X. Abarbanel; Edward B. Barison; Richard Kay; Harry Rybnick
- Starring: John Agar; Rosemarie Stack
- Cinematography: William C. Thompson
- Edited by: Howard A. Smith
- Music by: Raoul Kraushaar
- Production company: R.K. Films
- Distributed by: United Artists
- Release date: October 29, 1954
- Running time: 83 minutes
- Country: United States
- Language: English

The Golden Mistress is a 1954 American adventure horror film directed by Abner Biberman and starring John Agar and Rosemarie Stack. It is set in Haiti, and deals with the search for a voodoo treasure.

== Cast ==
- John Agar as Bill Buchanan
- Rosemarie Stack as Ann Dexter
- Jacques Molant as Ti Flute
- André Narcisse as Iznard, Dombala Houngan
- Abner Biberman as Carl Dexter
- André Contant as Dombala Soloist
- Pierre Blain as 'Untamed' Houngan
