= Arthur Hanson =

American film, stage and television actor

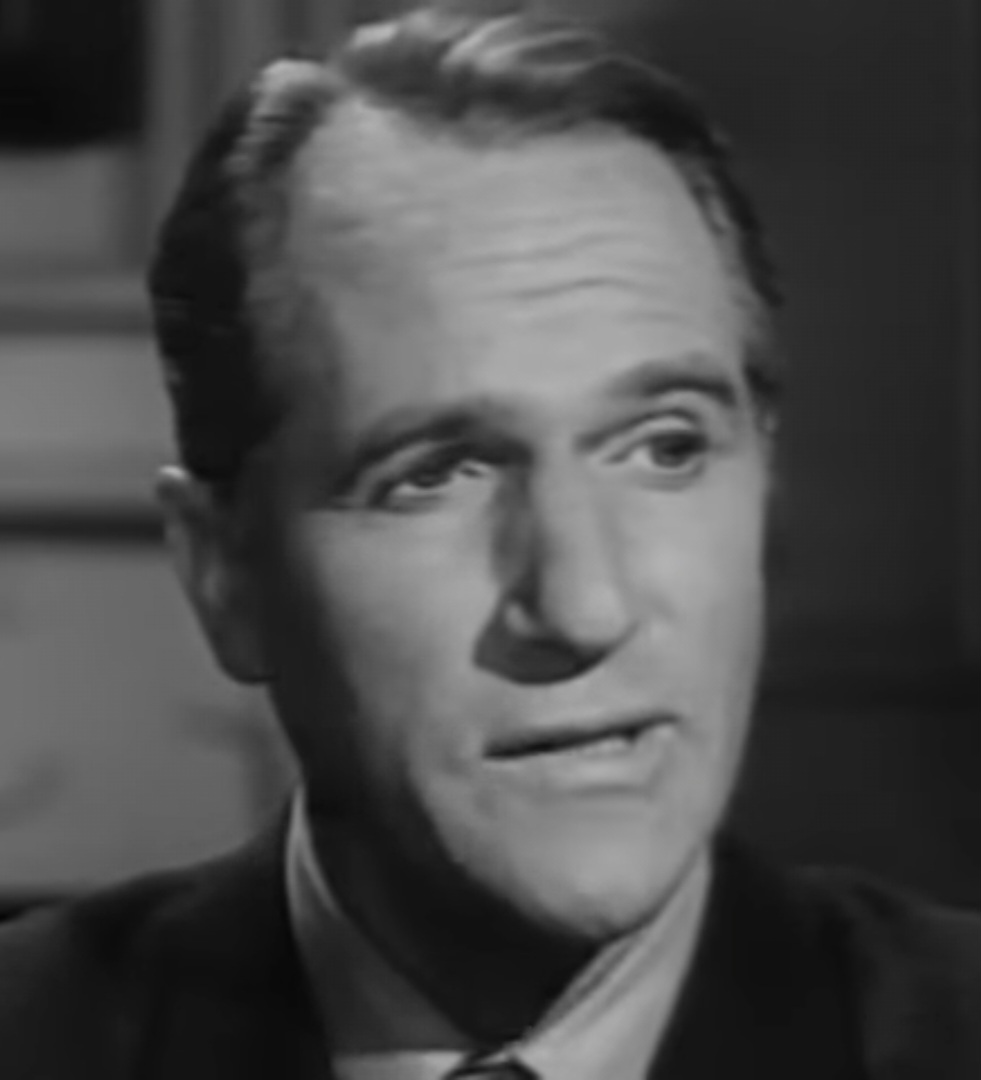
- Hanson in One Step Beyond, 1960
- Born: Arthur Miller Hanson; October 15, 1915; Beverly, Massachusetts, U.S.
- Died: February 21, 1991 (aged 75); Los Angeles County, California, U.S.
- Occupations: Film, stage and television actor

Arthur Miller Hanson (October 15, 1915 – February 21, 1991) was an American film, stage and television actor.

== Life and career ==
Hanson was born in Beverly, Massachusetts. He began his screen career in 1950, appearing in the NBC anthology television series The Clock. In the same year, he appeared in the television programs Kraft Mystery Theatre and Lights Out. During his screen career, in 1959, he played Michael Haney in the stage play Who Was That Lady I Saw You With at Pasadena Playhouse.

Later in his career, Hanson guest-starred in numerous television programs including Perry Mason, Wanted Dead or Alive, Ironside, Days of Our Lives, The Andy Griffith Show, 77 Sunset Strip, The Man from U.N.C.L.E. (and its spin-off The Girl from U.N.C.L.E.), One Step Beyond, M Squad, Hogan's Heroes and Dr. Kildare. He also appeared in films such as The Boston Strangler, The Hindenburg, Zero Hour!, They Came to Cordura and Outside the Law.

Hanson retired from acting in 1985, last appearing in the CBS detective television series Crazy Like a Fox.

== Death ==
Hanson died on February 21, 1991, in Los Angeles County, California, at the age of 75.
