= Eddie Hice =

American actor

- Born: March 1, 1930; Los Angeles, California
- Died: March 12, 2015 (aged 85); Sylmar, California
- Occupations: Stuntman, Stunt coordinator, Second unit director

Edward Louis Joseph Hice (March 1, 1930 – March 12, 2015) was an American stuntman and actor best known for his contributions to the Star Trek franchise.

Born in Los Angeles, California, Hice enlisted in the Marines and served from 1946 to 1949.

After beginning acting in the 1950s with appearances in The Texan and Bonanza, Hice's stunt career began in 1967, with uncredited work on films such as Bonnie and Clyde, Planet of the Apes and M*A*S*H.

With a career spanning well over 50 years, with credits in films such as Glory, Repo Man, Big Momma's House, RoboCop 2, A View to a Kill, and Escape from New York, Hice's final job was on the 2007 film Georgia Rule. Throughout his career, Hice earned over 80 stunt credits and 30 actor credits. He died in Sylmar, California, on March 12, 2015, at the age of 85.

== Filmography & Television ==
- Gunsmoke (1964-1965) - Dexter / Carl
- Young Fury (1964) - Member of The Hellion Gang
- Batman (1966) - Guinea Pig #1 (uncredited)
- Hell's Belles (1969) - Red Beard
- Little House on the Prairie (1976) - Roy Collins
- The Lord of the Rings (1978) - Character Actor
