= Abner Biberman =

American actor, director, and screenwriter (1909–1977)

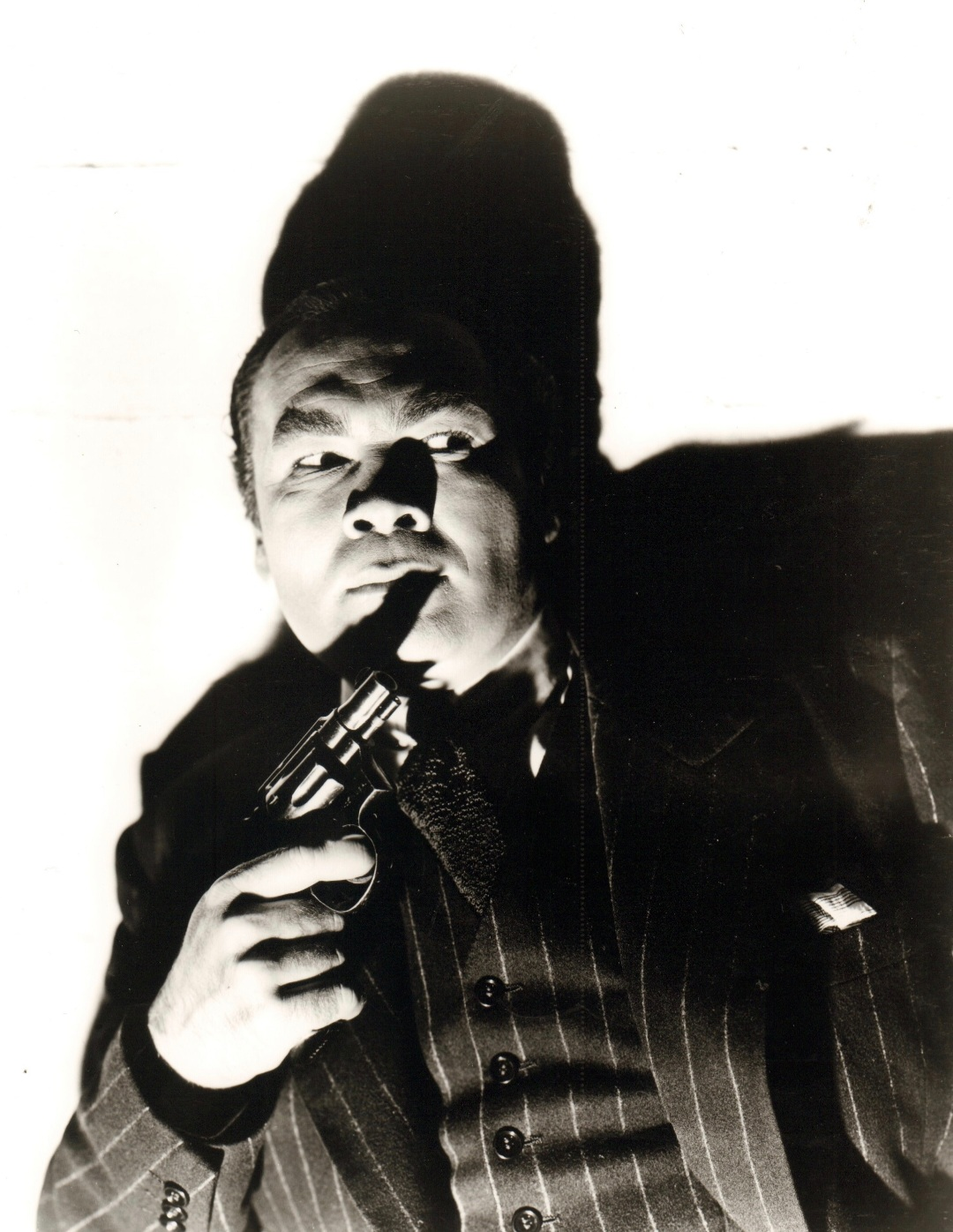
- Biberman in Submarine Alert (1943)
- Born: Abner Warren Biberman; April 1, 1909; Milwaukee, Wisconsin, U.S.
- Died: June 20, 1977 (aged 68); San Diego, California, U.S.
- Other name: Joel Judge
- Education: University of Pennsylvania
- Occupations: Actor; director; screenwriter; drama coach
- Years active: 1933–1977
- Spouses: Tholbie Sacher (m. 1928; div. 19??); Helen Call (m. 1938; div. 19??) Sibil Kamban (m. 1954)
- Children: 3; including Anthony Call

Abner Warren Biberman (April 1, 1909 – June 20, 1977) was an American actor, director, and screenwriter.

Ruthless-looking, he was in demand to portray a wide variety of heavies and foreign nationalities during the Golden Years of Hollywood. He later developed a successful career as a prolific director of episodic TV, spanning genres from Gilligan’s Island to Hawaii Five-O (1968 TV series).

== Early years ==
Biberman was born in Milwaukee, Wisconsin, the son of Jacob M. Biberman (1884–1964) and Fannie Biberman (née Nahin, 1885–1922). The family later moved to Philadelphia, Pennsylvania. He gained early acting experience as a student at the Tome School for Boys prep school. He also attended the University of Pennsylvania.

== Career ==
He was sometimes credited under the pseudonym Joel Judge.

== Death ==
Biberman died at his home in San Diego, California. His obituary in The New York Times gave his age as 69. He was survived by his wife and three sons.

== Filmography ==
=== As actor ===
- 1936: Soak the Rich
- 1939: Gunga Din as Chota
- 1939: Panama Patrol as Arlie Johnson
- 1939: Panama Lady as Elisha
- 1939: The Magnificent Fraud as Ruiz
- 1939: Each Dawn I Die as Shake Edwards (uncredited)
- 1939: Lady of the Tropics as Wardrobe buyer (uncredited)
- 1939: The Rains Came as John, the Baptist
- 1939: The Roaring Twenties as Lefty, Hally's Henchman
- 1939: Another Thin Man as Dum-Dum, Church's Henchman
- 1939: Joe and Ethel Turp Call on the President as Extra at Dance (uncredited)
- 1939: Balalaika as Leo Proplinski
- 1940: His Girl Friday as Louis "Diamond Louie" Palutso
- 1940: The Marines Fly High as Gomez (uncredited)
- 1940: Zanzibar as Aba
- 1940: Enemy Agent as Baronoff
- 1940: Ski Patrol as Russian Field Commander
- 1940: South of Pago Pago as Manuel Ferro
- 1940: South to Karanga as Manek Sen
- 1940: Golden Gloves as Torsovitch (uncredited)
- 1940: Girl from Havana as Captain Lazear
- 1941: The Monster and the Girl as George, Perry's Aide (uncredited)
- 1941: Singapore Woman as Singa
- 1941: The Gay Vagabond as Ratmar
- 1941: This Woman Is Mine as Lamazie
- 1941: South of Tahiti as Tahawa
- 1941: The Devil Pays Off as Carlos Castillo-Martinez
- 1942: Broadway as Trado
- 1942: Whispering Ghosts as Mack Wolf
- 1942: Beyond the Blue Horizon as La'oa
- 1942: Little Tokyo, U.S.A. as Satsuma
- 1942: King of the Mounties as Adm. Yamata
- 1942: Road to Morocco as Man
- 1943: Submarine Alert as Commander Toyo
- 1943: Bombardier as Japanese Sergeant (uncredited)
- 1943: The Leopard Man as Charlie How-Come
- 1943: Behind the Rising Sun as Inspector (uncredited)
- 1944: The Bridge of San Luis Rey as Maita
- 1944: Two-Man Submarine as Gabe Fabian
- 1944: Dragon Seed as Captain Yasuda (uncredited)
- 1944: The Keys of the Kingdom as Wai's captain (uncredited)
- 1945: Betrayal from the East as Yamato
- 1945: Salome Where She Danced as Dr. Ling
- 1945: Back to Bataan as Japanese captain at schoolhouse
- 1945: Captain Kidd as Theodore Blades (uncredited)
- 1946: Strange Conquest as Molugi
- 1950: Winchester '73 as Latigo Means
- 1951: Roaring City as Eddie Page
- 1952: Viva Zapata! as Captain (uncredited)
- 1954: Knock on Wood as Maurice Papinek
- 1954: Elephant Walk as Dr. Pereira
- 1954: The Golden Mistress as Carl Dexter
- 1956: The Price of Fear as Mort Kleinman, Pathologist (uncredited)
- 1974: Kodiak (TV Series) as Abraham Lincoln Imhook

=== As director ===
- 1954: The Golden Mistress (Also screenwriter)
- 1955: The Looters
- 1955: Running Wild
- 1956: The Price of Fear
- 1956: Behind the High Wall
- 1957: Gun for a Coward
- 1957: The Night Runner
- 1957: Maverick (TV series)
- 1957: Colt .45 (TV series)
- 1958: Flood Tide
- 1958: 77 Sunset Strip (TV series)
- 1960: National Velvet (TV series)
- 1961: Ben Casey (TV series)
- 1962: The Dummy (The Twilight Zone) (TV series)
- 1962: The Virginian (TV series)
- 1963: The Outer Limits
- 1963: "The Incredible World of Horace Ford" (The Twilight Zone) (TV series)
- 1964: Voyage to the Bottom of the Sea (TV series)
- 1964: Number 12 Looks Just Like You (The Twilight Zone) (TV series)
- 1964: I Am the Night—Color Me Black (The Twilight Zone) (TV series)
- 1965: Seaway (TV series)
- 1965: The Trials of O'Brien (TV series)
- 1965: Gunsmoke (TV series)
- 1966: Too Many Thieves
- 1969: The Bold Ones: The New Doctors (TV series)
- 1969-1970: Hawaii Five-O (TV series)
