= Marla English =

American actress (1935–2012)

- Born: Marleine Gaile English; January 4, 1935; San Diego, California, U.S.
- Died: December 10, 2012 (aged 77); Tucson, Arizona, U.S.
- Occupation: Actress
- Years active: 1953–1957
- Spouse: Allen Paul Sutherland (m. 1956)
- Children: 5

Marla English (January 4, 1935 – December 10, 2012) was an American film actress during the 1950s.

== Career ==
Born Marleine Gaile English in San Diego, California, as a teenager she worked as a model. She was originally signed to a contract by Paramount Pictures in 1952 after winning a San Diego beauty pageant to be "Fairest of the Fair". She was paid $150 per week to appear in such films as Red Garters (1954) and Rear Window (1954). Even though her scenes were often cut during the final editing of those and other films, English's contract rose to $200 a week. Her breakthrough role came when producer Aubrey Schenck borrowed her from Paramount to appear in his film noir production Shield for Murder (1954) starring Edmond O'Brien.

=== The Mountain and later films ===
English received a major break in 1955, when she was cast opposite Spencer Tracy in The Mountain, a mountain-climbing drama that was to be filmed on location in the French Alps. Unfortunately, English was given a smallpox vaccine before departing the United States for France. She soon developed a very high fever and decided to leave the production, a move that prompted Paramount to suspend her and replace her with Barbara Darrow. In a later interview with the actress, Parade questioned English about that decision. She said it was a very dumb move, and she was unsure why she did it. One of the actress's close relatives, however, told the publication that the true story was that English had fallen in love with Paramount actor Larry Pennell, and she became enraged when the studio would not cast Pennell in the film, hoping they could work together in France. According to English's own son the vaccine reaction was not the reason, but rather the true reason was the story given here about English's love for Larry Pennell. In fact she even asked if Pennell could just join her on the trip to France so they could be together, but this request was also denied by the studio.

English made mostly B films throughout her career in Hollywood. In 1955, she performed with John Ireland and Pennell in Hell's Horizon. Some other films in which she was cast in this period include Three Bad Sisters (1956), Runaway Daughters (1956), The She Creature (1956), and Flesh and the Spur (1956). She and Suzanne Alexander were the finalists for the role of Princess Aouda in Around the World in 80 Days (1956) after Shirley MacLaine rejected it twice. But MacLaine later got the role after she reconsidered it.

== Personal life and death ==
After co-starring with Tom Conway and Mike Connors in the horror film Voodoo Woman (1957), English married San Diego businessman Allen Paul Sutherland. She then retired from acting at just 21 years old. They had a daughter and four sons.

English died of cancer at age 77 in Tucson, Arizona in December 2012. Her husband Paul Sutherland died five years later. Their graves are in Marana Cemetery in Marana, Arizona, 24 miles northwest of Tucson.

== Filmography ==
- Casanova's Big Night (1954) – Girl on Bridge (uncredited)
- Yankee Pasha (1954) – Harem Girl (uncredited)
- About Mrs. Leslie (1954) – Minor Role (uncredited)
- Living It Up (1954) – Manicurist (uncredited)
- Rear Window (1954) – Girl at Songwriter's Party (uncredited)
- Shield for Murder (1954) – Patty Winters
- Desert Sands (1955) – Princess Zara
- Hell's Horizon (1955) – Sammi
- Three Bad Sisters (1956) – Vicki Craig
- The George Burns and Gracie Allen Show (1956, TV Series) – Myia
- The Bob Cummings Show (1956, TV Series) – Marie / Marie de Carlo
- Crossroads (1956, TV Series) – Barbara Sherman
- The She-Creature (1956, for AIP) – Andrea Talbott / Elizabeth Wetherby
- A Strange Adventure (1956) – Lynn Novak
- Flesh and the Spur (1956, for AIP) – Wild Willow
- Runaway Daughters (1956, for AIP) – Audrey Barton a.k.a. Lola Marshall
- Voodoo Woman (1957, for AIP) – Marilyn Blanchard (final film role)

== See also ==
- "Louella Parsons Reports From Hollywood", North Carolina Daily Independent (Kannapolis, North Carolina), March 4, 1956, p. 22.
- "People In The News", Nebraska Sunday Journal and Star (Lincoln, Nebraska), July 22, 1956, p. 6.
