= Superbeast (film) =

- Theatrical release poster
- Directed by: George Schenck
- Written by: George Schenck
- Produced by: George Schenck; Aubrey Schenck (uncredited)
- Starring: Antoinette Bower; Craig Littler; Harry Lauter; Vic Díaz; Jose Romulo
- Cinematography: Nonong Rasca
- Edited by: Anthony DiMarco
- Music by: Richard LaSalle
- Production companies: A & S Productions
- Distributed by: United Artists
- Release date: November 1, 1972
- Running time: 90 minutes
- Countries: United States; Philippines
- Language: English

Superbeast is a 1972 American-Philippine horror film written and directed by George Schenck and starring Antoinette Bower, Craig Littler, Harry Lauter, Vic Díaz and Jose Romulo. It was released on November 1, 1972, by United Artists. It was released as a double feature with Daughters of Satan. It was the last film to feature Harry Lauter, who retired in 1979 before his death in 1990.

== Plot ==
A doctor finds a jungle laboratory, complete with mad scientist and genetic engineering experiments. Dr. Bill Fleming (Craig Littler) is experimenting on convicts and once they are driven mad with the experiments, they are sent into the jungle where they are hunted down by the project's financier, Stuart Victor (Harry Lauter). Pathologist Dr. Alix Pardee (Antoinette Bower) finds out about the project, is captured and held captive. But she manages to turn the tables on Dr. Fleming and Victor.

In the Philippines, a desperate man takes an identity of a passenger and flies to the US. During the flight, the man becomes violent and it forces the plane to land in Guam. Once there, the man, who has now become deformed, is killed by security guards. After Dr. Alix Pardee examines the body, she becomes interested in his condition and decides to go to the Philippines to investigate.

During the flight, she sits next to a man named Victor, where they exchange pleasantries. Later, she meets Victor again on a boat that's taking her to Pangan where another man with the same deformities was found. When Alix mentions Victor to the Captain, he claims there's no other American on board, and when she goes to his room, someone else is residing there.

In Pangan, Alix is greeted by Dr. Raul Rojas, who's been studying that man and wants to investigate as well. They make their way to a remote village where the man was found. After interviewing a man who was shot, they take a dug out canoe downstream to where he said he saw the man. During the trip, they go over a high waterfall and Rojas is assumed killed.

Alix wakes up in a bed in a plantation in the jungle. She is greeted by Dr. Bill Fleming. While looking outside, she recognizes Officer Diaz from Pangan as well as Victor, who is not happy that she's here. Fleming then shows her around. He explains that he's working on a serum that turns violent people normal, and that Diaz would supply him with the convicts he needed to do his genetic engineering experiments. He then admits that some of his test subjects relapse and become more violent.

Because of her Pathology background, Fleming becomes friendlier with her since she could help find the solution to his serum. Alix is allowed to go around the plantation as she pleases. One night, she sneaks into the lab and takes a sample of the serum, and then recognizes one of the convicts locked up, though he never showed any signs of aggression.

The next morning, she is awakened by gun shots. Fleming then explains that when his test subjects relapse and become violent, they go into a metamorphosis that turns them into a primitive beast, yet with the same intelligence, hence the name “Superbeast”. He also explains that Victor is an oil tycoon and big game hunter. When he needed money to continue his research, Victor would provide him the money, provided that when his test subjects become superbeasts, he would be allowed to hunt them down, which is what he did with the previous test subject.

Diaz would announce that he filed a police report stating Alix and Rojas was killed, which meant that Alix would have to be killed. During lunch, Alix gives Fleming a drink laced with the serum. After drinking, Fleming's looks and mannerisms begin to change. As he looks in his lab for a possible cure, he becomes violent and pushes Alix unconscious. As he walks out, Victor is there with his gun, forcing him into the jungle so he can hunt him down. After Victor kills Diaz and a helper, he goes after Fleming. By nightfall, Victor tracks Fleming back to the plantation. Victor shoots a servant girl before Fleming sneaks behind him and bludgeons him to death. After tearing up his lab, he notices the convict that hasn't deformed or become violent. Alix reveals that he's your success and that the serum worked.

The next morning, Alix, the convict, and a couple more patients are allowed to leave. Once they crossed the bridge, Fleming destroys the bridge, allowing him to live the rest of his life in solitude.

== Cast ==
- Antoinette Bower as Dr. Alix Pardee
- Craig Littler as Dr. Bill Fleming
- Harry Lauter as Stewart Victor
- Vic Díaz as Mondo Diaz
- Jose Romulo as Vigo
- John Garwood as Ray Cleaver
- Manny Ojeda as Dr. Raul Rojas
- Bruno Punzalan as Datu
- Alex Flores as Sloco
- Roderick Paulate as Pepe
- Ricardo Santos as Benny
- Nanita as Lupe

== Critical response ==
A. H. Weiler of The New York Times wrote: "Three hours of mutants and witches should be just what the horror crowd would order. But Superbeast and Daughters of Satan, the double order of ersatz chillers served up at local theaters yesterday, generate more yawns than goose bumps. The Philippines, where both were filmed in vivid colors, is scenic and arresting, and provide a good deal more interest than the films' jerry-built plots."

== See also ==
- List of American films of 1972
