= Desert Sands =

1955 film by Lesley Selander

- Theatrical release poster
- Directed by: Lesley Selander
- Screenplay by: Danny Arnold; George W. George; George F. Slavin
- Based on: Punitive Action by John Robb
- Produced by: Howard W. Koch executive Aubrey Schenck
- Starring: Ralph Meeker; Marla English; J. Carrol Naish; John Carradine; Ron Randell; John Smith; Keith Larsen
- Cinematography: Gordon Avil
- Edited by: John F. Schreyer
- Music by: Paul Dunlap
- Production company: Bel-Air Productions
- Distributed by: United Artists
- Release date: November 18, 1955
- Running time: 87 minutes
- Country: United States
- Language: English

Desert Sands is a 1955 American adventure film directed by Lesley Selander and written by Danny Arnold, George W. George and George F. Slavin. The film stars Ralph Meeker, Marla English, J. Carrol Naish, John Carradine, Ron Randell, John Smith and Keith Larsen.

The film was released on November 18, 1955, by United Artists. The film was based on the 1954 novel Punitive Action, one of a series of French Foreign Legion novels written by John Robb. Unlike many Foreign Legion films the film was set in the 1950s.

== Plot ==
A strong force of mounted tribal Arabs launches a surprise attack on a French Foreign Legion fort in the North African desert, having previously intercepted and brutally massacred a relief column en route to the fort. After an Alamo-like battle, the more numerous Arabs capture the fort. Addressing the surviving Legionnaires as captives, the Arab leader makes passing reference to Pan-Islam as a motivation for the attacks.

Various sub-plots ensue, until eventually another Legion relief column approaches the fort, unaware that it has been captured. The Arabs create the appearance that all is well and ambush the relief column as it enters the fort. Meanwhile, the captive Legionnaire survivors from the original garrison escape and join the fighting. Another all-out, Alamo-style shootout follows, but this time the reinforced Legionnaires are victorious. The French flag is raised over the fort once again as the captured Arab survivors are led away.

== Cast ==
- Ralph Meeker as Captain David Malcolm
- Marla English as Princess Zara
- J. Carrol Naish as Sergeant Diepel
- John Carradine as Jala, The Wine Merchant
- Ron Randell as Private Peter Ambrose Havers
- John Smith as Private Rex Tyle
- Keith Larsen as El Zanal
  - Marc Cavell as Young Boy El Zanal
- Lita Milan as Alita
- Philip Tonge as Corporal Sandy McTosh
- Peter Mamakos as Private Lucia "Lucky" Capella
- Otto Waldis as Gabin
- Jarl Victor as Lieutenant Gina Mackie
- Mort Mills as Woloack
- Aaron Saxon as Tama
- Nico Minardos as Gerard
- Albert Carrier as Ducco
- Terence De Marney as Kramer
- Peter Bourne as Weems
- Peter Norman as Dr. Kleiner
- Joseph Waring as Dylak Spokesman
- Bela Kovacs as Major Henri Panton

== Production ==
The film was based on a 1954 novel by John Robb, Punitive Action. Robb wrote a sequel to this, Storm Evil. In September 1954 it was announced Schenck-Kock productions had brought the film rights.

The film was shot at the Imperial Dunes in California. The first choice for the lead was Paul Newman who was offered $20,000 however his agent wanted $35,000 that the producers would not pay.

== Reception ==
Variety said the writers "used every cliche in the book, not even bothering to cast around for a novel twist" where Randell "believe it or not" plays an "English- man addicted to the bottle, who when the fighting starts, exonerates himself.. His performance has a certain merit." The critic did add the film "isn’t going to win any Academy Awards, but it’s an actioner that doesn’t pretend to be anything else. For that reason alone, it should hold its own."
