= Kill a Dragon =

1967 film by Michael D. Moore

- Original film poster
- Directed by: Michael D. Moore
- Written by: William Marks; George Schenck
- Produced by: Hal Klein
- Starring: Jack Palance; Fernando Lamas; Aldo Ray
- Cinematography: Emmanuel I. Rojas
- Music by: Philip Springer; Buddy Kaye (lyrics); Pat Briley (title song)
- Distributed by: United Artists
- Release date: December 6, 1967
- Running time: 91 minutes
- Country: United States
- Language: English

Kill a Dragon is a 1967 American adventure film directed by Michael D. Moore and starring Jack Palance and Fernando Lamas. It was written by William Marks and George Schenck.

An adventurer battles a ruthless dictator/warlord.

== Plot ==
On an island of Hong Kong’s New Territories, a ship's cargo of nitroglycerin washes ashore due to a typhoon. The islanders claim the cargo under the law of salvage, but the powerful Nico Patrai threatens to destroy the island and its inhabitants if the nitroglycerine is not given to him in three days.

The village head Win Lim and two other islanders escape Patrai's men to go to Macau where they seek the help of soldier of fortune Rick Masters who lives on a junk. Masters defeats some of Patrai's henchmen who have pursued the villagers. Win Lim offers him one third of the profits of the cargo if he can transport it to Hong Kong.

Masters recruits some of his friends to take on Patrai.

== Cast ==
- Jack Palance as Rick Masters
- Fernando Lamas as Nico Patrai
- Aldo Ray as Vigo
- Aliza Gur as Tisa
- Kam Tong as Win Lim
- Don Knight as Ian
- Hans William Lee as Jimmie
- Judy Dan as Chunhyang
- Young Yip Wang as Chang

== Production ==
It was filmed under the working title of To Kill a Dragon on location in Hong Kong and Macau, produced by Aubrey Schenck and released through United Artists.

== Release ==
In the United States the film was double billed with Navajo Joe (1966).

== Reception ==
Boxoffice wrote: "The film is based on the conflict between two ruthless men, played by Jack Palance and Fernando Lamas, who will do almost anything for money. Aldo Ray stars with them and they are about as reckless a trio as youll want to see while hanging on to your seat during some of the tense scenes. ... The best scenes are of the islanders and the herculean efforts of all to save the salvage for themselves. In De Luxe Color, the locales where the film was shot add charm."

Variety wrote: "Put the theme of The Magnificent Seven in and around Hong Kong, surround it with a cliché script, routine performances and direction and a small budget, and it adds up to a low-quality pic that may have a short run in the nabes as lower half of a double bill before being sold to TV."

The Monthly Film Bulletin wrote: "Despite a shaky and melodramatic script, this adventure yarn moves at a pace fast enough to gloss over the loopholes in the narrative, and always manages to sidestep the obvious – particularly in its good-natured, tongue-in-cheek finale. It's a pity, though, that the battle of wits between the two principals could not have been more imaginatively contrived."

== See also ==
- List of American films of 1967
