= Daughters of Satan =

1972 film by Hollingsworth Morse

- U.S. film poster
- Directed by: Hollingsworth Morse
- Screenplay by: John C. Higgins
- Story by: John A. Bushelman
- Produced by: Aubrey Schenck
- Starring: Tom Selleck; Barra Grant; Tani Guthrie; Paraluman; Vic Silayan; Vic Díaz
- Cinematography: Nonong Rasca
- Edited by: Anthony DiMarco
- Music by: Richard LaSalle
- Production companies: A & S Productions
- Distributed by: United Artists
- Release date: September 27, 1972 (Salt Lake City)
- Running time: 90 minutes
- Countries: United States; Philippines
- Language: English

Daughters of Satan is a 1972 horror film directed by Hollingsworth Morse. It stars Tom Selleck in his first leading film role, along with Barra Grant, Tani Guthrie, Paraluman, Vic Silayan and Vic Díaz. It was an international co-production of American and Philippine companies, and was filmed entirely in Manila. It was released in the United States by United Artists in the fall of 1972, screening as a double feature with Superbeast.

== Plot ==
In Manila, the dominatrix leader of a coven of Satanic witches tortures a member who has strayed from them. Meanwhile, American museum curator James Robertson visits Carlos Ching's antiques store under the pretext of purchasing a painting for a museum. While in the shop, James encounters a painting from 1592 depicting conquistadors burning three women and a dog at the stake—he is taken aback when he notices that one of the women bears a striking resemblance to his wife, Chris. James purchases the painting, and finds Chris highly disturbed by it. She remarks the name of the coven depicted in it—the Duarte coven—and also knows the year the executions took place, but cannot recall where she learned of it.

The following day, Chris is approached by a dog that resembles that in the painting, and which bears a collar with the name Nicodemus. James later notices the dog has mysteriously faded from the painting. Shortly after, a woman named Juana Rios stops by the home, claiming to be responding to a housekeeper advertisement, though Chris informs her they did not place one. Juana glimpses the painting in the living room, and she and Chris both notice that Juana also resembles one of the women depicted in it. A frightened Chris asks Juana to leave, but Juana insists on staying to help Chris fulfill her "destiny" before presenting her with an antique dagger. After Juana takes on housekeeping duties for the Robertsons, James notices that a second figure—this time one of the three witches-has disappeared from the painting.

James visits the address on Nicodemus's collar, which he finds to be a mortuary. The man working there directs James to the address of Carlos's antique store; as Jim exits the mortuary, he fails to notice a coffin being prepared with his name, as well as the corpse of the woman tortured by the coven. Upon entering Carlos's store, James finds Carlos dead, a dagger in his heart, and is attacked by an unknown man, but manages to elude him. The incident prompts James to visit Dr. Dangal, a psychiatrist. During their visit, one of Dangal's other patients, Kitty—the dominatrix coven leader—rambling about being forced to do evil things. After she leaves, James remarks that she resembles the third woman in the painting.

Chris begins to make subtle attempts at murdering James, but none are successful. James discusses the changes in his wife's personality with Dangal, who begins to suspect she may be possessed. James and Dangal notice that the images in the painting seem to reappear at night, when neither Juana, Chris, or Nicodemus are active. Later, Dangal has a vision of the three witches dancing as he drives home. Kitty manifests an explosion that kills him on a bridge. After Dangal's funeral, Kitty attempts to seduce James, and then shows him another painting depicted a different scene of the witch burning, which shows the magistrate Roberson who ordered the execution; James observes that it bears a striking resemblance to himself. Kitty believes Jim is a descendant of Roberson, and that the women he executed have sought vengeance against every subsequent generation in his family.

Later, the coven convenes in a dilapidated villa. Chris is strung up half-naked and beaten by Kitty, who accuses of her failing to fulfill her task. After she returns home, Chris drugs James, and she, Juana, and Kitty place him in his car atop a precipice with ice blocks beneath the tires. Just before midnight—when the car should plunge over the cliff—James awakens. Meanwhile, Chris, Kitty, and Juana, all gathered at a restaurant, come out of a deep trance. Juana introduces herself to the others as Almina Remundo, a nurse; Chris expresses fear about Jim's whereabouts, after which Kitty urges her to visit Dr. Dangal. Chris returns home by herself, and finds Jim there, alive. Though groggy, he recalls escaping the car before it plunged over the cliff. Nicodemus, who was previously antagonistic to James, is now friendly. Chris continues to feel something is awry. As she and James lie down on his office couch, the painted images of the witches begin to fade. A tearful Chris reaches for the dagger, and stabs James to death.

== Cast ==
- Tom Selleck as James Robertson
- Barra Grant as Chris Robertson
- Tani Guthrie as Kitty Duarte
- Paraluman as Juana Rios
- Vic Silayan as Dr. Dangal
- Vic Díaz as Carlos Ching
- Gina Laforteza as Andrea
- Ben Rubio as Tommy Tantuico
- Paquito Salcedo as Mortician
- Chito Reyes as Guerilla
- Bobby Greenwood as Mrs. Postlewaite

== Production ==
The film was shot entirely on-location in and around Manila between April and May 1972. Producer Aubrey Schenck remarked of the shoot: "We didn't hoke it up, which you could have done with witchcraft; I thought John Higgins wrote a good story."

Schenck shot Daughters of Satan back-to-back with the film Superbeast, using much of the same crew. Actor Vic Diaz starred in both films.

== Release ==
The film was released in Salt Lake City on September 27, 1972 before opening in other cities throughout October 1972.

== See also ==
- List of American films of 1972

== Sources ==
- Senn, Bryan (2019). "Twice the Thrills! Twice the Chills!": Horror and Science Fiction Double Features, 1955-1974. Jefferson, North Carolina: McFarland. ISBN 978-1-476-63571-2.
