= Gerald Drayson Adams =

Canadian screenwriter

Gerald Drayson Adams (June 25, 1900 – August 23, 1988) was a Canadian-born American business executive and literary agent when he began writing for films in the 1940s. The Oxford University-educated Adams specialized in action/adventure and western films. His films include Dead Reckoning (1947) starring Humphrey Bogart, The Big Steal (1949), Armored Car Robbery (1950), His Kind of Woman (1951, uncredited), The Black Sleep (1956), and Kissin' Cousins (1964), starring Elvis Presley, for which he received a WGA award nomination. Adams also wrote for television series, including the pivotal episodes "Hostage" with James Garner and Jack Kelly and "Stampede" with Efrem Zimbalist Jr. for Maverick (1957) as well as "The Savage Hills" with Diane Brewster for the same series.

== Filmography ==
=== Films ===
Year	Film	Credit	Notes
1941	A Girl, a Guy and a Gob	Story By	Uncredited
1941	The Miracle Kid	Written By	
1942	Duke of the Navy	Story By, Screenplay By	Co-Wrote Screenplay with "William Beaudine" & "John T. Coyle"
1945	A Guy, a Gal and a Pal	Screenplay By	
1945	Tell It to a Star	Story By	Co-Wrote Story with "John W. Krafft"
1946	The Invisible Informer	Story By	
1946	The Magnificent Rogue	Story By	
1947	Dead Reckoning	Story By	
1948	Old Los Angeles	Written By	Co-Wrote Screenplay with "Clements Ripley"
1948	The Gallant Legion	Screenplay By	
1948	The Plunderers	Screenplay By	Co-Wrote Screenplay with "Gerald Geraghty"
1949	The Big Steal	Screenplay By	
1950	Armored Car Robbery	Screenplay By	Co-Wrote Screenplay with "Earl Felton"
1950	The Desert Hawk	Screenplay By	
1950	Between Midnight and Dawn	Story By	Co-Wrote Story with "Leo Katcher"
1951	His Kind of Woman	Story By	Uncredited
1951	The Prince Who Was a Thief	Written By	Co-Wrote Screenplay with "Aeneas MacKenzie"
1951	The Lady from Texas	Screenplay By	Co-Wrote Screenplay with "Connie Lee Bennett"
1951	Flame of Araby	Written By	
1951	The Sea Hornet	Written By	
1951	The Golden Horde	Screenplay By	
1952	Son of Ali Baba	Written By	
1952	The Duel at Silver Creek	Story By, Screenwriter By	Co-Wrote Screenplay with "Joseph Hoffman"
1952	Untamed Frontier	Screenplay By	Co-Wrote Screenplay with "John Bagni" & "Gwen Bagni"
1952	The Battle at Apache Pass	Written By	
1952	Steel Town	Written By	Co-Written Screenplay with "Lou Breslow"
1952	Flaming Feather	Written By	
1953	Wings of the Hawk	Story By	
1954	Three Young Texans	Screenplay By	
1954	The Gambler from Natchez	Story By, Screenplay By	Co-Wrote Screenplay with "Irving Wallace"
1954	Princess of the Nile	Written By	
1954	Taza, Son of Cochise	Story By	
1955	Chief Crazy Horse	Story By, Screenplay By	Co-Wrote Screenplay with "Franklin Coen"
1955	Duel on the Mississippi	Written By	
1956	The Black Sleep	Story By	
1956	Gun Brothers	Written By	Co-Wrote Screenplay with "Richard Schayer"
1956	Three Bad Sisters	Screenplay By	
1957	Affair in Reno	Story By	
1957	Tomahawk Trail	Screenplay By	
1957	War Drums	Screenplay By	
1959	Frontier Rangers	Screenplay By	
1960	Mission of Danger	Screenplay By	
1961	Fury River	Screenplay By	
1961	Gun Fight	Written By	
1962	The Wild Westerners	Written By	
1964	Gold, Glory and Custer	Screenplay By	
1964	Kissin' Cousins	Story By, Screenplay By	
1965	Harum Scarum	Screenplay By	

=== Television ===
Year	TV Series	Credit	Notes
1955	General Electric Theater	Writer	1 Episode
1957	Broken Arrow	Writer	2 Episodes
1957-60	Maverick	Writer	5 Episodes
1958	77 Sunset Strip	Writer	1 Episode
1958-59	Northwest Passage	Writer	9 Episodes
1959	The Texan	Writer	1 Episode
1959-62	Bronco	Writer	9 Episodes
1960	Bourbon Street Beat	Writer	1 Episode
1960-62	Cheyenne	Writer	5 Episodes
1961	Miami Undercover	Writer	3 Episodes
1961	Surfside 6	Writer	1 Episode
