= Robinson Crusoe on Mars =

1964 American science fiction film by Byron Haskin

- Theatrical release poster
- Directed by: Byron Haskin
- Screenplay by: Ib Melchior; John C. Higgins
- Based on: Robinson Crusoe by Daniel Defoe
- Produced by: Aubrey Schenck
- Starring: Paul Mantee; Victor Lundin; Adam West
- Cinematography: Winton C. Hoch
- Edited by: Terry O. Morse
- Music by: Nathan Van Cleave
- Production company: Schenck-Zabel
- Distributed by: Paramount Pictures
- Release date: June 17, 1964 (Providence, Rhode Island)
- Running time: 110 minutes
- Language: English

Robinson Crusoe on Mars is a 1964 American science fiction film directed by Byron Haskin and produced by Aubrey Schenck that stars Paul Mantee, Victor Lundin, and Adam West. It is a science fiction retelling of the classic 1719 novel Robinson Crusoe by Daniel Defoe. The film was distributed by Paramount Pictures and filmed in Technicolor and Techniscope.

== Plot ==
Commander Christopher "Kit" Draper, USN, and Colonel Dan McReady, USAF, reach the red planet in their spaceship, Mars Gravity Probe 1. They are forced to use up their remaining fuel in order to avoid an imminent collision with a large orbiting meteoroid; they descend in one-man lifeboat pods, becoming the first humans on Mars, but are separated.

Draper eventually finds a cave for shelter and discovers what he needs to survive: burning coal-like rocks provides heat and also releases oxygen. This allows him to refill his air tanks with a hand pump to explore in the thin Martian atmosphere. On one excursion, he locates McReady's crashed pod and corpse. He finds their monkey Mona, who survived the crash.

Later, Draper notices that Mona keeps disappearing and is uninterested in their dwindling food and water supply. He gives her a salty cracker, but no water. When Mona gets thirsty, he follows her to a cave with a large pool of water that has edible sausage-like plants growing in it.

As the days grow into months, Draper slowly begins to crack from the prolonged isolation. He hallucinates an alive, but mute, McReady. He also watches helplessly as his spaceship, an inaccessible "supermarket", periodically orbiting overhead; without fuel, it cannot follow his radioed order to land.

While exploring, Draper encounters a dark, nearly upright rock slab. Curious, he digs around it, exposing a skeletal hand and arm wearing a black bracelet. He uncovers the rest of the humanoid skeleton and determines the alien was murdered; the front of the skull shows a hole, and the back shows heavy charring. To hide his presence, Draper signals his ship to self-destruct.

Soon after, Draper sees a spaceship descend and land just over the horizon. Believing it is a rescue ship, he heads towards the landing site the following morning, only to see alien spacecraft darting about in the sky. He approaches cautiously and sees human-like slaves being used for mining by human-shaped captors wearing spacesuits and bearing weapons. One slave escapes and runs into Draper; an alien spaceship blasts the area as the two escape. Draper notices the stranger is wearing black bracelets like the one he found in the grave. Draper rescues the stranger and takes him to the cave. The aliens bombard the mine area that night and depart. Later, when he and the stranger investigate, they find the other slaves are dead.

Draper names his new acquaintance "Friday", after the character in Robinson Crusoe. At first, Draper is wary of his new companion, but they gradually grow to trust and like each other. Soon, Draper begins teaching him English. A passing meteoroid explodes, showering their area with a thick black ash. Draper is buried under the heavy material, but Friday saves Draper and shares his "air pills", which provide oxygen.

The alien spacecraft returns later, apparently tracking Friday by his bracelets. Draper tries to remove the bracelets with a wire saw. When the aliens blast their hiding place, Draper, Friday, and Mona flee north through underground Martian canals. They eventually surface near the polar icecap. Exhausted, freezing, and nearly out of air pills, they build a snow shelter. Draper is finally able to cut off Friday's bracelets shortly before a meteoroid crashes into the ice cap; the resulting explosion and firestorm melts the ice and snow, saving them from freezing to death.

Shortly thereafter, Draper detects an approaching spaceship. He fears it is the returning aliens, but the portable radio picks up an English-speaking voice. A capsule descends, and the film ends with Mars receding in the distance.

== Cast ==
The film feature only four characters as in the opening credits:

- Paul Mantee as Commander Christopher "Kit" Draper, USN
- Victor Lundin as Friday
- Adam West as Colonel Dan McReady, USAF
- Barney the Woolly Monkey as Mona

== Production ==
Exterior locations were shot mostly at Zabriskie Point in Death Valley National Park, California.

Special effects by Lawrence Butler and Academy Award-winning matte artist Albert Whitlock gave the film the benefit of "big-studio resources usually lacking in movies about outer space". Whitlock provided the matte paintings used in Robinson Crusoe on Mars, as he commented that "some scenes of spacecraft in motion were created with the kind of flat animation seen in official NASA promotional films". For the alien spacecraft, designer Albert Nozaki constructed three miniatures closely resembling the "Martian war machines" he had made previously for Haskin for The War of the Worlds (1953).

Byron Haskin told interviewer Joe Adamson:

Robinson Crusoe on Mars was so obviously a director's tour de force, that there was nobody to interfere and tell me how to shoot ... I can't think of any other film I've made, unless it was The War of the Worlds, where I had such complete autonomy ... that I had as much genuine pleasure and fulfillment from as Robinson Crusoe on Mars. It was as fulfilling as cinematography had ever been. Everything I set out to do, I accomplished as well as one possibly could ... We made exploratory trips into Death Valley, and I conceived a key to credible verisimilitude ... I would abandon shots from the valleys, make them from up on the ridges. Death Valley had been seen in hundreds of westerns, but they were all shot from the bottoms of the canyons, because that's where horses could gallop through. On the top of these weird looking ridges of marshmallow sands, the vista was something else. It looked like another planet—certainly not Death Valley. Additionally, I conceived making the blue skies red ... It was wintertime, and the skies were deep blue. They formed a perfect traveling matte

With past experience producing special effects, Haskin even hand animated photos of the slave ships that terrorize the protagonist which were patterned after Japanese visual effects designer Albert Nozaki's Martian ships' design in Haskin's earlier film, War of the Worlds.

Ib Melchior was the original screenwriter, but had to drop out to work on other projects. He later complained about the changes made to his screenplay. According to producer Aubrey Schenck, the original script featured a variety of monsters and alien beings, which were jettisoned in the name of plausibility, the medium-sized budget, and because those ideas detracted from the premise of an astronaut being stranded and alone on Mars; Melchior, however, denied this. Instead of Mona the Monkey, the original screenplay featured a Martian creature that would have been a costumed armadillo, but a monkey was deemed more believable and easier to train.

Paul Mantee was chosen out of approximately 70 actors (including Vic Lundin) based on his being an experienced unknown, and by Haskin, because he resembled Alan Shepard, the first American in space. The film was originally to be titled Gravity Probe One: Mars, but Paramount's sales manager Charles Boasberg thought that title sounded too much like a documentary.

According to Mantee, because Barney the monkey was a male playing Mona, a female, he had to wear a fur-covered diaper.

At the time of production, it was still plausible to depict Mars as having an atmosphere and water. Scientific discoveries shortly thereafter confirmed neither was the case.

== Songs ==
Two songs were inspired by and named after the film. One was sung by Johnny Cymbal, the other by Victor Lundin. Lundin wrote the song "Robinson Crusoe on Mars" to perform during his science fiction convention appearances. He recorded it for his 2000 album Little Owl.

== Reception ==
Despite positive critic reaction at the time, Robinson Crusoe on Mars did not do well at the box office. Film reviewer Glenn Erickson opined: "Despite laudable efforts from all concerned, the film didn't click with audiences. Indifferent distribution was blamed, but it's also likely that the public preferred to see its astronauts on the 6 O'Clock News".

On the review aggregator website Rotten Tomatoes, 94% of 17 critics' reviews are positive, with an average rating of 6.5/10.

Film historian Leonard Maltin considered Robinson Crusoe on Mars "a surprisingly agreeable reworking of the classic Defoe story ... beautifully shot in Death Valley by Winston C. Hoch; the film's intimate nature help it play better on TV than most widescreen space films".

In the Time Out review editor John Pym saw Robinson Crusoe on Mars as "... intelligently imaginative sci-fi ... most remarkably (director) Haskin avoids sentimentality when dealing with the monkey, such is the assured sensitivity of the film".

Kevin Thomas in the Los Angeles Times said: "Robinson Crusoe on Mars ... has superb special-effects and strong performances by its space age hero, his man Friday and an irresistible monkey name Mona. ... The film's overall design and the careful composition of each scene make it a work of art".

== Home media ==
Robinson Crusoe on Mars received its first home media release in the United States in December 1993 on LaserDisc by The Criterion Collection, a video company known for its painstaking restorations of films. The Criterion Collection subsequently released it on DVD on September 18, 2007 as a special edition, and later on Blu-ray on January 11, 2011. A high-definition video image transfer was performed and color corrected using the film's original 35 mm film negative, while the original monaural soundtrack was digitally remastered in stereo at 24 bit.

Criterion added a number of bonus features on the releases of the film: a "stills" gallery from both the film itself, as well as behind-the-scenes shots. There is also the original theatrical trailer and an audio interview with director Byron Haskin recorded in 1979. A music video for Victor Lundin's song "Robinson Crusoe on Mars" was created in 2007 specifically for the film's DVD release. A full color booklet is also included with various facts about the film.

== See also ==
- "The Invisible Enemy" (The Outer Limits), a 1964 television episode released a few months later, in which Adam West and his crew arrive on Mars, and must struggle to survive against an unknown enemy.
- List of American films of 1964
- List of films featuring extraterrestrials
- List of films set on Mars
- Mars in fiction
- The Martian (film)
- Survival film, about the film genre, with a list of related films
