= Bronco (TV series) =

American Western television series (1958–1962)

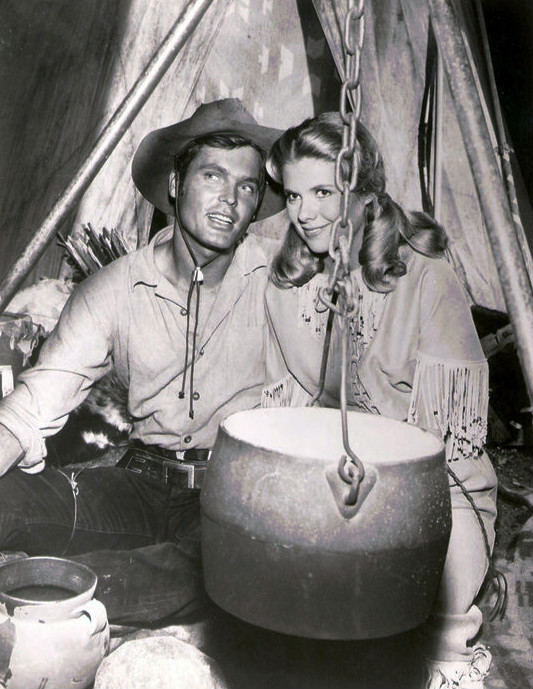
- Ty Hardin and Nina Shipman in Bronco (1962)
- Also known as: Cheyenne: Bronco; The Cheyenne Show: Bronco
- Genre: Western
- Starring: Ty Hardin†
- Theme music composer: Mack David and; Jay Livingston
- Country of origin: United States
- Original language: English
- No. of seasons: 4
- No. of episodes: 68

Production
- Executive producer: William T. Orr
- Producers: Arthur W. Silver; Sidney Biddel; Charles Hoffman; Oren W. Haglund (production manager); Gordon Bau (make-up)
- Production location: California
- Running time: 60 mins.
- Production company: Warner Bros. Television

Original release
- Network: ABC
- Release: September 23, 1958 – April 30, 1962

Related
- Cheyenne

Bronco is an American Western television series on ABC from 1958 through 1962. It was shown by the BBC in the United Kingdom. The program starred Ty Hardin as Bronco Layne, a former Confederate officer who wandered the Old West, meeting such well-known individuals as Wild Bill Hickok, Billy the Kid, Jesse James, Theodore Roosevelt, Belle Starr, Cole Younger, and John Wesley Hardin.

== Overview ==
Bronco premiered in the fall of 1958 when Warner Bros. executives and actor Clint Walker clashed over Walker's contract on the series Cheyenne. Walker had walked out on his show over such stringent clauses as a requirement that he return half of all personal appearance fees to Warner Bros., and that he only record for Warner music labels. When the two sides came to an impasse, the network hired newcomer Ty Hardin to play the new character of Bronco Layne, but kept the title of Cheyenne.

When Walker came back to his series, Bronco became a spin-off of Cheyenne. Bronco at first alternated with another Western series, Sugarfoot, featuring Will Hutchins. In 1960, the two began alternating with Cheyenne under the Cheyenne title. Sugarfoot was dropped in 1961, leaving only Bronco and Cheyenne to alternate. Other Warner Bros. Westerns in production around this time included Maverick with James Garner, Jack Kelly, and Roger Moore, Colt .45 with Wayde Preston, and Lawman with John Russell; series characters occasionally crossed over into each other's series.

According to the theme song, Bronco came from the Texas Panhandle, but episodes of the series are set throughout the West.

In the eighth episode, "Freeze-Out" (December 30, 1958), a writer calling herself Mary Brown, played by Grace Raynor, hires Bronco to escort her to a ghost town in the high country, where they encounter three men amid the isolation. As it develops, Mary is not interested so much in story ideas, but in the body of a man buried in a nearby glacier and missing gold. Some four years before the debut of his The Virginian, James Drury plays the part of John Smith, who develops a romantic interest in Mary. Edgar Stehli (1884–1973) plays the part of "Pancake" Riddle.

== Guest stars ==
- Peter Breck was Theodore Roosevelt in "Yankee Tornado" (1961).
- Ahna Capri appeared as the child Emily in "A Town That Lived and Died" (1962).
- Russ Conway appeared as Willis Turner, with Chris Alcaide as Brutus Traxel, in "The Silent Witness" (1959).
- Walter Coy was Sheriff Walters in "The Turning Point" (1958), Victor Leggett in "Backfire" (1959), and Sheriff Springer in "Beginner's Luck" (1962).
- Francis De Sales was Lawrence Larson in "Hero of the Town" (1959).
- Med Flory appeared as Vance Pelham in "Then the Mountains" (1962).
- Dean Fredericks was Great Wolf in "Seminole War Pipe" (1960).
- Tod Griffin was Sheriff Garth Nelson in "The Silent Witness" (1959) and Chip Garnes in "Volunteers from Aberdeen" (1960).
- Rodolfo Hoyos, Jr. portrayed Manuel Figueres in "Flight from an Empire" (1959).
- I. Stanford Jolley was Stover in "Brand of Courage" (1958) and Old Man Shirley in "Shadow of Jesse James" (1960).
- Douglas Kennedy as Paul Duquesne in "Four Guns and a Prayer" (1958)
- Scott Marlowe appeared as John Wesley Hardin in "The Turning Point" (1958).
- Gregg Palmer was Colton in "Destinies West" (1962).
- Judson Pratt was Marlow in "Manitoba Manhunt" (1961).
- Pernell Roberts appeared as Reverend Dave Clayton in "The Belles of Silver Flats" (1959).
- Randy Stuart was Claire Russo in "Tangled Trail" (1960).
- Olive Sturgess was Virginia Munger in "Guns of the Lawless" (1961).
- Gary Vinson appeared four times in different roles between 1958 and 1961: "Four Guns and a Prayer", "The Devil's Spawn" (as Bud Donner), "The Invaders", and "Cousin from Atlanta".
- Tony Young appeared twice, as Cpl. Red Bird in "The Burning Springs" (1959) and as Tod Chapman in "One Evening in Abilene" (1962).
- Jack Nicholson appeared as the young lover Bob in the episode "The Equalizer" in season four, episode four (1961). Jack Elam played Mr. Thompson in the same episode.

== Episodes ==
=== Series overview ===
Overview of Bronco seasons
Season	Episodes	Originally released	
Season	Episodes	First released	Last released
1	20	September 23, 1958	September 19, 1959
2	20	September 22, 1959	June 14, 1960
3	10	October 17, 1960	May 8, 1961
4	18	October 16, 1961	April 30, 1962

=== Season 1 (1958–59) ===
No. overall	No. in season	Title	Directed by	Written by	Original release date
1	1	"The Besieged"	Alan Crosland Jr.	Story by : Teleplay by : Robert Fisher & Alan Lipscott	September 23, 1958
2	2	"Quest of the Thirty Dead"	Lee Sholem	Story by : Teleplay by : Thomas W. Blackburn	October 7, 1958
3	3	"The Turning Point"	Alan Crosland Jr.	Story by : George W. George; Teleplay by : George F. Slavin	October 21, 1958
4	4	"Four Guns and a Prayer"	Alan Crosland Jr.	Story by : Teleplay by : Dean Riesner	November 4, 1958
5	5	"Long Ride Back"	Leslie H. Martinson	Story by : Teleplay by : James O'Hanlon	November 18, 1958
6	6	"Trail to Taos"	Alan Crosland Jr.	Story by : Teleplay by : Richard H. Landau	December 2, 1958
7	7	"Brand of Courage"	Lee Sholem	Story by : Teleplay by : Berne Giler	December 16, 1958
8	8	"Freeze-Out"	Lee Sholem	Story by : Steve Frazee; Teleplay by : Thomas W. Blackburn	December 30, 1958
9	9	"Baron of Broken Lance"	Lee Sholem	Story by : Gerald Drayson Adams; Teleplay by : Gerald Drayson Adams & Dean Riesner	January 13, 1959
10	10	"Payroll of the Dead"	Lee Sholem	Story by : Steve Frazee; Teleplay by : George F. Slavin	January 27, 1959
11	11	"Riding Solo"	Alan Crosland Jr.	Story by : Kenneth Perkins; Teleplay by : Thomas W. Blackburn	February 10, 1959
12	12	"Borrowed Glory"	Harmon Jones	Story by : Vick Knight; Teleplay by : Berne Giler	February 24, 1959
13	13	"Silent Witness"	Harmon Jones	Story by : Teleplay by : Arnold Belgard & Tom Gries	March 10, 1959
14	14	"The Belles of Silver Flat"	Lee Sholem	Story by : Teleplay by : Robert Fisher & Alan Lipscott	March 24, 1959
15	15	"Backfire"	Lee Sholem	Story by : Will Cook; Teleplay by : Albert Aley	April 7, 1959
16	16	"School for Cowards"	Lee Sholem	Story by : Teleplay by : George F. Slavin	April 21, 1959
17	17	"Prairie Skipper"	Alan Crosland Jr.	Story by : Teleplay by : Arnold Belgard	May 5, 1959
18	18	"Shadow of a Man"	Alan Crosland Jr.	Story by : Walker A. Tomkins; Teleplay by : Albert Aley	May 19, 1959
19	19	"Hero of the Town"	Lee Sholem	Story by : Teleplay by : Arnold Belgard	June 2, 1959
20	20	"Red Water North"	Lee Sholem	Story by : Alan Le May; Teleplay by : Fenton Earnshaw & Dean Reisner	September 19, 1959

=== Season 2 (1959–60) ===
No. overall	No. in season	Title	Directed by	Written by	Original release date
21	1	"Game at the Beacon Club"	Arthur Lubin	Story by : Arthur W. Silver; Teleplay by : Jackson Gillis	September 22, 1959
22	2	"The Burning Springs"	Edward Dein	Story by : Teleplay by : Gerald Drayson Adams	October 6, 1959
23	3	"Bodyguard"	Lee Sholem	Story by : Teleplay by : James O'Hanlon	October 20, 1959
24	4	"The Soft Answer"	Leslie Goodwins	Story by : Teleplay by : Arnold Belgard	November 3, 1959
25	5	"The Last Resort"	Lee Sholem	Story by : Teleplay by : Jack Laird	November 17, 1959
26	6	"The Devil's Spawn"	Lee Sholem	Story by : Wayne D. Overholser & George F. Slavin; Teleplay by : George F. Slavin	December 1, 1959
27	7	"Flight from an Empire"	Edward Dein	Story by : James Gunn; Teleplay by : Albert Aley	December 15, 1959
28	8	"Night Train to Denver"	Leslie Goodwins	Story by : Teleplay by : George F. Slavin	December 29, 1959
29	9	"Shadow of Jesse James"	Leslie Goodwins	Story by : Teleplay by : Gerald Drayson Adams	January 12, 1960
30	10	"Masquerade"	Herbert L. Strock	Story by : Teleplay by : Arnold Belgard	January 26, 1960
31	11	"Volunteers from Aberdeen"	Herbert L. Strock	Story by : Louis S. Kaye; Teleplay by : Ron Bishop & Wells Root	February 9, 1960
32	12	"Every Man a Hero"	Herbert L. Strock	Story by : Teleplay by : George F. Slavin	February 23, 1960
33	13	"Death of an Outlaw"	Herbert L. Strock	Story by : Teleplay by : Gerald Drayson Adams	March 8, 1960
34	14	"The Human Equation"	Lee Sholem	Story by : Teleplay by : Arnold Belgard	March 22, 1960
35	15	"Montana Passage"	Reginald LeBorg	Story by : Jack DeWitt; Teleplay by : Gerald Drayson Adams & Howard Browne	April 5, 1960
36	16	"Legacy of Twisted Creek"	Andre De Toth	Story by : Teleplay by : Jack Laird	April 19, 1960
37	17	"Tangled Trail"	Herbert L. Strock	Story by : Teleplay by : R. Wright Campbell & Dean Riesner	May 3, 1960
38	18	"La Rubia"	Reginald LeBorg	Story by : Gerald Drayson Adams; Teleplay by : Arthur W. Silver	May 17, 1960
39	19	"Winter Kill"	Jesse Hibbs	Story by : Walter Doniger; Teleplay by : Kenneth Higgins	May 31, 1960
40	20	"End of a Rope"	Lew Landers	Story by : Orville H. Hampton; Teleplay by : Orville H. Hampton & W. Hermanos	June 14, 1960

=== Season 3 (1960–61) ===
No. overall	No. in season	Title	Directed by	Written by	Original release date
41	1	"The Mustangers"	Robert Altman	Story by : Frank Bonham; Teleplay by : William Bruckner	October 17, 1960
42	2	"Apache Treasure"	Robert B. Sinclair	Story by : Teleplay by : Charles Smith	November 7, 1960
43	3	"Seminole War Pipe"	Robert Sparr	Story by : Teleplay by : Gerald Drayson Adams	December 12, 1960
44	4	"Ordeal at Dead Tree"	Robert Sparr	Story by : Teleplay by : Frank Castle	January 2, 1961
45	5	"The Invaders"	William J. Hole Jr.	Story by : Teleplay by : Sylvan Churnas & Don Tait	January 23, 1961
46	6	"The Buckbrier Trail"	Robert Sparr	Story by : Teleplay by : William Bruckner	February 20, 1961
47	7	"Yankee Tornado"	Lee Sholem	Story by : Teleplay by : Warren Douglas	March 13, 1961
48	8	"Manitoba Manhunt"	Herbert L. Strock	Story by : Teleplay by : Gerald Drayson Adams	April 3, 1961
49	9	"Stage to the Sky"	Robert Sparr	Story by : Teleplay by : Warren Douglas	April 24, 1961
50	10	"Guns of the Lawless"	Richard C. Sarafian	Story by : Todhunter Ballard; Teleplay by : William L. Stuart	May 8, 1961

=== Season 4 (1961–62) ===
No. overall	No. in season	Title	Directed by	Written by	Original release date
51	1	"The Cousin from Atlanta"	Michael O'Herlihy	Story by : Teleplay by : Peter Germano	October 16, 1961
52	2	"Prince of Darkness"	Marc Lawrence	Story by : Teleplay by : Warren Douglas	November 6, 1961
53	3	"One Came Back"	Robert Sparr	Story by : Teleplay by : Lee Loeb	November 27, 1961
54	4	"The Equalizer"	Marc Lawrence	Story by : Teleplay by : Warren Douglas	December 18, 1961
55	5	"The Harrigan"	Robert Sparr	Story by : William L. Stuart; Teleplay by : Fred Eggers	December 25, 1961
56	6	"Beginner's Luck"	Leslie H. Martinson	Story by : Steve Frazee; Teleplay by : George F. Slavin	January 1, 1962
57	7	"Ride the Whirlwind"	Gunther von Fritsch	Story by : Teleplay by : Warren Douglas	January 15, 1962
58	8	"A Sure Thing"	Paul Landres	Story by : Don Martin; Teleplay by : Fred Eggers & Don Martin	January 22, 1962
59	9	"Trail of Hatred"	Paul Landres	Story by : Gerald Drayson Adams; Teleplay by : Cy Chermak	February 5, 1962
60	10	"Rendezvous with a Miracle"	Gunther von Fritsch	Story by : Kay Linaker & Howard Phillips; Teleplay by : Kay Linaker, Howard Phillips & Bob Wehling	February 12, 1962
61	11	"Destinies West"	George Waggner	Story by : Teleplay by : Barry Shipman	February 26, 1962
62	12	"The Last Letter"	Robert Sparr	Story by : Teleplay by : David Lang	March 5, 1962
63	13	"One Evening in Abilene"	Richard Benedict	Story by : Teleplay by : Berne Giler	March 19, 1962
64	14	"Until Kingdom Come"	Paul Landres	Story by : Teleplay by : Lee Loeb	March 26, 1962
65	15	"Moment of Doubt"	Paul Landres	Story by : Teleplay by : Lester Fuller	April 2, 1962
66	16	"A Town That Lived and Died"	Paul Landres	Story by : Teleplay by : Richard H. Landau	April 9, 1962
67	17	"The Immovable Object"	Sidney Salkow	Story by : Teleplay by : Arnold Belgard	April 16, 1962
68	18	"Then the Mountains"	George Waggner	Story by : Teleplay by : George Waggner	April 30, 1962

== Release ==
=== Home media ===
Warner Bros. has released the first three seasons on DVD in Region 1 via their Warner Archive Collection. These are manufacture-on-demand (MOD) releases, available through Warner's online store and Amazon.com. The fourth and final season was released on May 19, 2015.

DVD name	Ep #	Release date
The Complete First Season	20	July 29, 2014
The Complete Second Season	20	October 14, 2014
The Complete Third Season	10	February 3, 2015
The Complete Fourth Season	18	May 19, 2015
