= The Gallant Legion =

1948 film by Joseph Kane

- Theatrical release poster
- Directed by: Joseph Kane
- Screenplay by: Gerald Drayson Adams
- Story by: John K. Butler; Gerald Geraghty
- Produced by: Joseph Kane
- Starring: Wild Bill Elliott; Lorna Gray; Joseph Schildkraut; Bruce Cabot; Andy Devine; Jack Holt
- Cinematography: Jack A. Marta
- Edited by: Richard L. Van Enger
- Production company: Republic Pictures
- Distributed by: Republic Pictures
- Release date: May 24, 1948
- Running time: 88 minutes
- Country: United States
- Language: English

The Gallant Legion is a 1948 American Western film directed by Joseph Kane and written by Gerald Drayson Adams. The film stars Wild Bill Elliott, Lorna Gray, Joseph Schildkraut, Bruce Cabot, Andy Devine and Jack Holt. The film was released on May 24, 1948, by Republic Pictures.

== Cast ==
- Wild Bill Elliott as Gary Conway
- Lorna Gray as Connie Faulkner
- Joseph Schildkraut as Senator Clarke Faulkner
- Bruce Cabot as Beau Laroux
- Andy Devine as Windy Hornblower
- Jack Holt as Captain Banner
- Grant Withers as Wesley Hardin
- Adele Mara as Catalina
- James Brown as Tom Banner
- Harold Landon as Chuck Conway
- Tex Terry as Sergeant Clint Mason
- Lester Sharpe as Matt Kirby
- Hal Taliaferro as Billy Smith
- Russell Hicks as Senator Beale
- Herbert Rawlinson as Major Grant
- Marshall Reed as Bowling
- Steve Drake as Steve
- Harry Woods as Lang
