= Three Bad Sisters =

1956 film

- Theatrical release poster
- Directed by: Gilbert Kay
- Screenplay by: Gerald Drayson Adams
- Story by: Devery Freeman
- Produced by: Howard W. Koch
- Starring: Marla English; Kathleen Hughes; Sara Shane; John Bromfield; Jess Barker
- Cinematography: Lester Shorr
- Edited by: John F. Schreyer
- Music by: Paul Dunlap
- Production company: Bel-Air Productions
- Distributed by: United Artists
- Release date: January 1956
- Running time: 76 minutes
- Country: United States
- Language: English

Three Bad Sisters is a 1956 American film noir crime film directed by Gilbert Kay, written by Gerald Drayson Adams and starring Marla English, Kathleen Hughes, Sara Shane, John Bromfield and Jess Barker. It was released in January 1956 by United Artists.

== Plot ==
Valerie, Vicki and Lorna Craig are the daughters of a man worth $40 million who is killed in a Wyoming plane crash. The pilot, Jim Norton, was unharmed.

Jim is unable to fly while the crash is investigated. Valerie offers him $200,000 to seduce and abandon her sister Lorna, executor of their father's will. Lorna is engaged to George Gurney, their father's attorney. Jim finds her contemplating a leap from a high cliff into the water, dared by Valerie to do it.

Valerie threatens to frame Jim for murdering her father if he refuses to cooperate. Then Vicki makes romantic advances, trying to lure Jim away from her sister's clutches. Valerie lashes her with a whip, scarring her face. Vicki flees in a car, crashes and is killed.

Jim proposes marriage to Lorna, who is unsure whether she can trust him. Valerie attempts to murder Lorna and stage it to appear to have been an accident. When her scheme fails, Valerie is killed in a speeding car. Jim goes to the cliff and discovers that Lorna has made the leap. He dives into the water and saves her.

== Cast ==
- Marla English as Vicki Craig
- Kathleen Hughes as Valerie Craig
- Sara Shane as Lorna Craig
- John Bromfield as Jim Norton
- Jess Barker as George Gurney
- Madge Kennedy as Martha Craig
- Anthony George as Tony Cadiz
- Marlene Felton as Nadine

== Reception ==
In a contemporary review for The New York Times, critic A. H. Weiler wrote: "John Bromfield, who is surrounded by the titular trio of decorative but decidedly disturbed dames exposed in 'Three Bad Sisters,' is heard to remark, 'I'm tired of being blamed for what happens in this nut house.' Mr. Bromfield makes quite a point there. A viewer is likely to become just as weary after observing only part of the homicides, mayhem and stock romance exhibited in this artless little melodrama ... Despite their pulchitrude [sic] and riches, 'Three Bad Sisters' make one poor picture."
