= Island of Love (1963 film) =

1963 film by Morton DaCosta

- Theatrical release poster
- Directed by: Morton DaCosta
- Screenplay by: David R. Schwartz
- Story by: Leo Katcher
- Produced by: Morton DaCosta
- Starring: Robert Preston; Tony Randall; Giorgia Moll; Walter Matthau; Betty Bruce
- Cinematography: Harry Stradling Sr.
- Edited by: William H. Ziegler
- Music by: Score: George Duning; Songs: Sammy Fain (music); Harold Adamson (lyrics)
- Production company: Warner Bros. Pictures
- Distributed by: Warner Bros. Pictures
- Release date: June 12, 1963
- Running time: 101 minutes
- Country: United States
- Language: English

Island of Love is a 1963 American comedy film directed by Morton DaCosta and written by David R. Schwartz. The film stars Robert Preston, Tony Randall, Giorgia Moll, Walter Matthau, Betty Bruce and Vassili Lambrinos. The film was released by Warner Bros. Pictures on June 12, 1963.

== Plot ==
Steve Blair, always on the lookout for a new money-making scheme, spots a stripper acquaintance, Cha Cha Miller, at a Greek restaurant in New York, and overhears her gangster boyfriend Tony Dallas opine that somebody should make a wholesome movie about Adam and Eve.

Steve quickly enlists his best friend Paul Ferris to write the script, and together, they talk Tony into putting up the $2 million needed to make the film. Tony, backed up by four identically dressed thugs, insists on one condition: Cha Cha has to be cast as Eve.

The film is a disaster. Cha Cha cannot act, and no one goes to see it. Tony feels hoodwinked and wants his money back, so Steve and Paul flee to Greece aboard a ship. When they arrive, another crackpot scam occurs to Steve: to turn a small island village known for nothing in particular into an "island of love". He goes to elaborate lengths to fool tourists and natives into believing that the island has a rich, romantic history.

Steve falls for a young woman, Elena, whom he had not seen since she was a girl. It turns out that she is Tony Dallas's niece, so Steve is in even more hot water when Tony arrives on the island. However, as soon as Steve agrees to marry Elena, he is safe from harm from Tony, now about to be a relative.

== Cast ==
- Robert Preston as Steve Blair
- Tony Randall as Paul Ferris
- Giorgia Moll as Elena Harakas
- Walter Matthau as Tony Dallas
- Betty Bruce as Cha Cha Miller
- Vassili Lambrinos as Professor Georg Pappas
- Michael Constantine as Andy
- Oliver Johnson as Professor Krumwitz
- Titos Vandis as Father Anaxagoras
- Miranta Myrat as Mama Harakas
- Lewis Charles as Louie
- Peter Mamakos as Nick
- Nick Dimitri as Hood
- Tony Rollins as Hood
- Victor Lundin as Hood
- Greg Benedict as Hood
- Lilian Miniati as Eunice Miranda
- Norma Varden as Wife in Nightclub
- Sam Harris as Husband in Nightclub

== Reception ==
The film was not well received by critics. As A.H. Weiler wrote in his review for The New York Times, "Most of this business is semi-revived Runyon. These guys and dolls appear to have been around too long." Although director-producer DaCosta and star Preston were coming off the huge success of their previous film The Music Man, the chilly reception for Island of Love put an abrupt halt to DaCosta's film career, and he returned to the stage.

== See also ==
- List of American films of 1963
