= His Kind of Woman =

1951 crime thriller movie produced by Howard Hughes

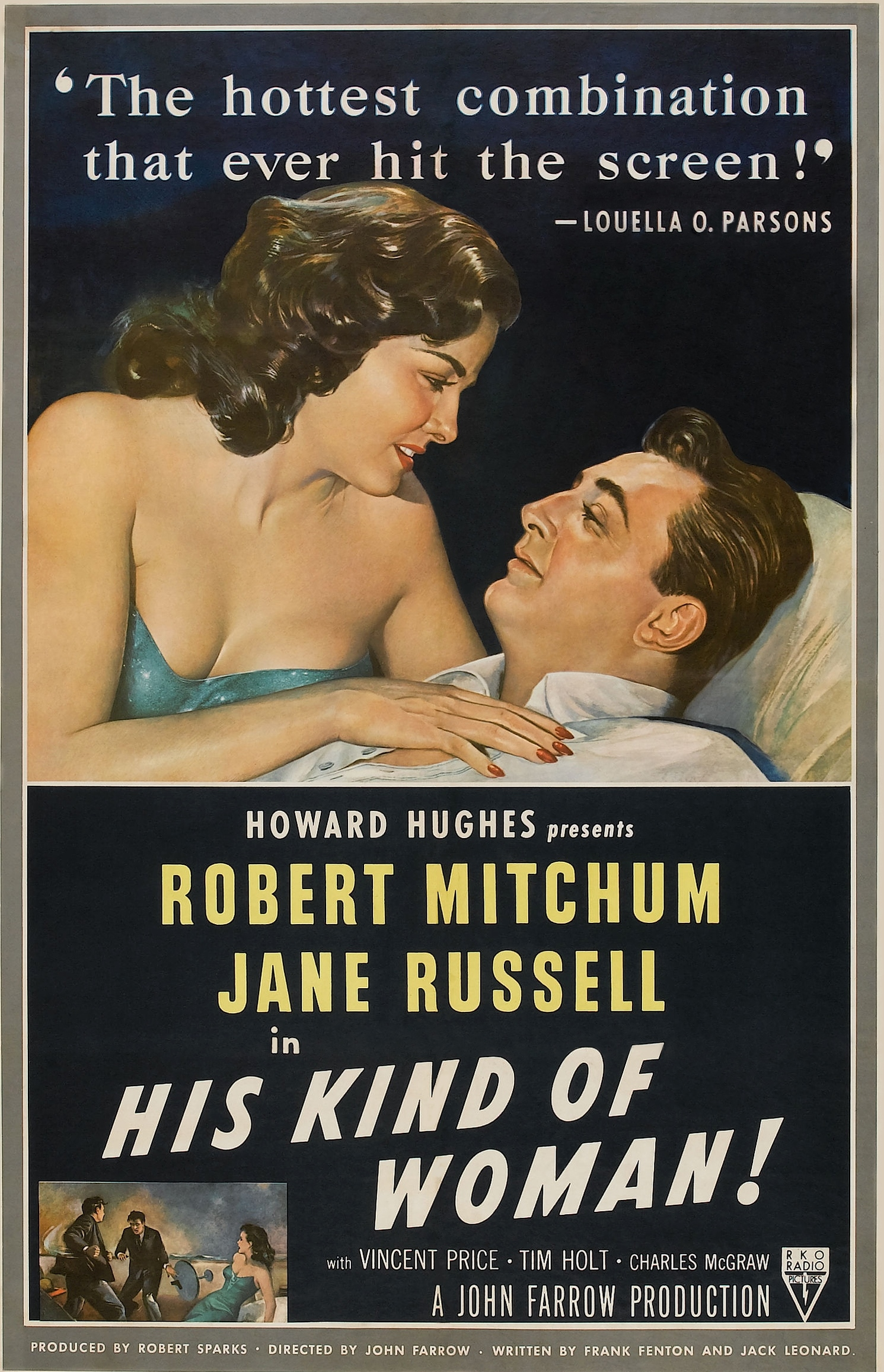
- theatrical release poster
- Directed by: John Farrow; Richard Fleischer (uncredited)
- Screenplay by: Frank Fenton; Jack Leonard
- Story by: Gerald Drayson Adams
- Produced by: Robert Sparks
- Starring: Robert Mitchum; Jane Russell; Vincent Price; Tim Holt; Charles McGraw
- Cinematography: Harry J. Wild
- Edited by: Frederic Knudtson; Eda Warren
- Music by: Leigh Harline
- Production company: RKO Pictures
- Distributed by: RKO Pictures
- Release dates: August 21, 1951 (Chicago); August 29, 1951 (New York); August 31, 1951 (Los Angeles)
- Running time: 120 minutes
- Country: United States
- Language: English
- Box office: US$2,000,000 (US rentals)

His Kind of Woman is a 1951 film noir directed by John Farrow and starring Robert Mitchum, Jane Russell, Vincent Price, Raymond Burr and Charles McGraw. The plot is based on the unpublished story "Star Sapphire" by Gerald Drayson Adams.

After Farrow submitted the film, RKO Pictures studio head Howard Hughes demanded extensive script revisions, recasting and reshooting of scenes directed by Richard Fleischer. This postproduction process took a great deal of time and money, costing about as much as the film lost at the box office in its initial release.

== Plot ==
Down on his luck professional gambler Dan Milner accepts a mysterious job that will take him out of the U.S. for a year but pays $50,000. He accepts a $5,000 advance and tickets to an isolated luxury resort on Mexico's Baja California coast, where he will receive further instructions. Milner is attracted to the only other passenger on his chartered flight south, attractive young millionaire Lenore Brent. When he arrives, Milner finds that several guests at the lodge have ulterior motives. He is disappointed to find that Lenore is the girlfriend of famous movie actor Mark Cardigan.

Milner overhears two guests, self-proclaimed author Martin Krafft and a man named Thompson, planning something that he suspects involves him. When Milner confronts them, he is given the $10,000 installment due him and told that someone is on his way to Baja to see him. An inebriated man flies in, despite warnings of very dangerous storm conditions. Milner thinks that he must be the contact, but when the two are alone, the pilot identifies himself as Bill Lusk, an undercover agent for the United States Immigration and Naturalization Service. He tells Milner that the government suspects that underworld boss Nick Ferraro, deported to Italy four years earlier, is scheming to return to the country posing as Milner. Milner is a loner whom no one is likely to miss, and Krafft is a plastic surgeon.

Cardigan's wife Helen and his manager Gerald Hobson appear. She has pulled the plug on a halfhearted Reno divorce after discovering she is still fond of her husband. Hobson also thinks that a split is a poor idea because Cardigan's film contract is expiring, and the bad publicity would make it hard for him to get a new one. With her plans ruined,

Lenore confesses to Milner that she is really just a singer looking to hook a wealthy spouse.

Milner helps a newlywed's husband recoup gambling losses to a card cheat. Lusk reveals Ferraro's plan to Milner, but is caught by Thompson. Finding Lusk's body on the beach convinces Milner that he had been telling the truth.

A yacht arrives in the bay. Milner is captured by Thompson, but passes a veiled plea for help to Lenore before he can be taken aboard. She persuades Cardigan, who is now bored at pretending to be a hero, to rescue him. While Cardigan keeps the mobsters at bay with rifle fire, Milner sneaks onto the yacht to capture Ferraro. He is caught and set to be drugged for surgery.

After killing two of Ferraro's thugs and capturing a wounded Thompson, Cardigan mounts an assault with the reluctant assistance of the Mexican police and a couple of adventure-seeking guests. A gunfight ensues aboard the yacht, followed by a melee. Milner breaks free and shoots Ferraro dead. Cardigan and Helen are reconciled. Milner and Lenore cozy up in his bungalow.

== Cast ==
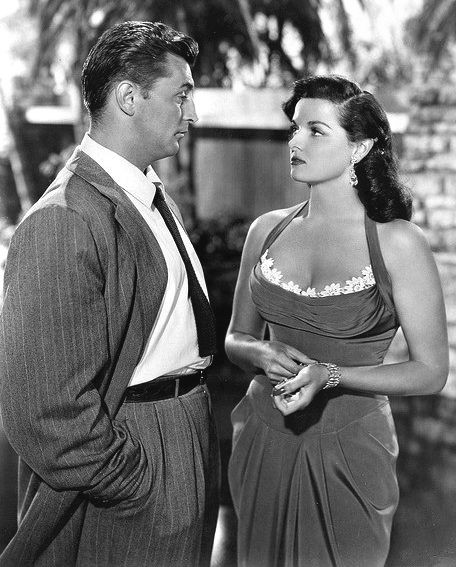
Robert Mitchum with Jane Russell in a scene from the film

- Robert Mitchum as Dan Milner
- Jane Russell as Lenore Brent
- Vincent Price as Mark Cardigan
- Tim Holt as Bill Lusk
- Charles McGraw as Thompson
- Marjorie Reynolds as Helen Cardigan
- Raymond Burr as Nick Ferraro
- Leslie Banning as Jennie Stone
- Jim Backus as Myron Winton
- Philip Van Zandt as Jose Morro
- John Mylong as Martin Krafft
- Carleton G. Young as Gerald Hobson
- Paul Frees as Corley
- Anthony Caruso as Tony

== Production ==
The film is based on the unpublished story "Star Sapphire" written by Gerald Drayson Adams. The film project was announced in July 1949 with Jane Russell and Robert Mitchum already attached. For Howard Hughes, who owned RKO Pictures and acted as its executive producer, Mitchum and Russell were the epitome of sexual chemistry.

Robert Sparks was slated to produce and John Farrow to direct. Farrow had directed Mitchum in Where Danger Lives the previous year, and they enjoyed a positive working experience. They expected His Kind of Woman to be a similar type of straightforward adventure thriller. However, Frank Fenton and Jack Leonard, who cowrote the screenplay, intended the film as a parody of the dark film noir crime films that were popular at the time, with comedy provided by the Mark Cardigan character.

Filming took place in November 1950, with retakes in December. Mitchum, who referred to himself as "The Tall Dog", called Jane Russell "Hard John" because of her strict, straitlaced religious beliefs. When a male reporter questioned these in light of her image, she told the reporter, "Christians can have big breasts too." Whatever sexual chemistry Mitchum and Russell had onscreen, the two performers were never more than friends.

Hughes, who had bought RKO Pictures in 1948, loved Vincent Price's character, and demanded that Farrow expand his role. However, Farrow had delivered what he believed to be a completed film and refused to execute Hughes' changes, leaving the production. Hughes asked director Richard Fleischer to change and reshoot the ending, estimating that the reshoot would take ten days to two weeks. When Fleischer declined Hughes' request, Hughes offered him the chance to remake his B picture The Narrow Margin with a million-dollar budget and RKO's top stars. Fleischer again refused, as he was satisfied with his work for The Narrow Margin. Hughes reacted by threatening to cancel that film's release, and Fleischer relented, reshooting most of the film.

Story conferences between Hughes, Fleischer and writer Earl Felton began on December 3, 1950, and took several months to complete. Hughes' obsession with the film caused the meetings to last as long as eight hours each. He demanded the addition of more slapstick comedy and brutality. He also added the character of Martin Krafft, the sadistic plastic surgeon. Hughes wrote all of Krafft's lines, recorded himself reciting them, and sent the recordings to the production to ensure that the part was played exactly as he had envisaged it.

To accommodate the new action sequences, the studio set was greatly expanded. The yacht set was in a very large water tank on Stage 22 of the RKO Culver City lot, the largest sound stage in Hollywood. A new scene involved the sinking of a rowboat, which required the emptying and subsequent refilling of the tank so that a portion of the tank could be rebuilt in order to deepen it.

After two months of shooting and a month of editing, one hour and 20 minutes of new material had been added. When Hughes viewed the new material, he demanded the reshooting of scenes involving Lee Van Cleef as Nick Ferraro. Robert J. Wilke was chosen to replace Van Cleef, forcing the reshooting of nearly every scene of the new material as well as some earlier scenes. Three-quarters of the way through this second reshoot, Hughes saw Raymond Burr in a film and ordered Ferraro's scenes shot a third time, with Burr replacing Wilke.

On the penultimate day of shooting during a fight scene, Mitchum started a real fight with some stunt men. He destroyed the set and much of the lighting and sound equipment on the stage.

In total, the reshooting of the film cost about $850,000, which was approximately equal to the amount of money that the film lost in its initial 1951 release.

== Release ==
Hughes promoted the film with a giant fireworks-shooting billboard featuring Mitchum and Russell that spanned Wilshire Boulevard, proclaiming them as "the hottest combination to ever hit the screen". The same image later caused problems in London over the amount of Russell's cleavage.

== Reception ==
Contemporary reviews were mixed.

The New York Times, critic Howard Thompson wrote: "In addition to being one of the worst Hollywood pictures in years, it is probably the only one since the advent of Vitaphone that needs sub-titles. One reasonably game spectator is still wondering what it was all about. ... The only innocent participant was behind the camera. Harry J. Wild's photography is nice indeed. But shame on the scenarists, Frank Fenton and Jack Leonard, and a ripe raspberry for John Farrow's pretentious direction. The stars are more to be pitied than censured—or, for that matter censored."

In the Chicago Tribune, reviewer Mae Tinée wrote: "Here is one of the weirdest hodge-podges I've ever encountered. It opens with a great air of mystery, which lasts so long that my reaction was that they could keep their old secrets ... With the entrance of Vincent Price, playing a mincing ham from Hollywood, the film takes on the aspects of a heavy handed comedy. In the final scenes, Mitchum is in the clutches of a sadistic maniac who puts him thru almost every conceivable form of torture ... While all this is going on, Price is also in the midst of a battle, but it's a wildly farcical melee. ... Aside from the fact that the plot seems to have been written by an idiot, and the film runs almost two solid hours, there are so many scenes of violence and brutality that I hereby warn parents against letting sensitive youngsters see it."

Critic Philip K. Scheuer of the Los Angeles Times described the film as "compounded of sex, sadism and smart cracks in about equal proportions" and wrote: "There's something happening every minute, and it scarcely matters that it is always more of the same. Squares like me do not tire of this sort of thing because Mitchum and Miss Russell are never at a loss when it comes to making with the words we wish WE could have thought up. In addition the women can look at him and the men can look at her."

The film recorded a loss of $825,000.

== Legacy ==
Filmmaker Brian De Palma sought to direct a remake in the 2000s and 2010s, although it was ultimately not produced because RKO refused to relinquish the rights to the property.

== Sources ==
- Farber, Manny. 2009. Farber on Film: The Complete Film Writings of Manny Farber. Edited by Robert Polito. Library of America. ISBN 978-1-59853-050-6

Further reading

- Fleischer, Richard (1993). Just Tell Me when to Cry: A Memoir. Carroll & Graf Publishers. ISBN 978-0-88184-944-8.
