= Paul Mantee =

American actor (1931–2013)

- Born: Paul Marianetti; January 9, 1931; San Francisco, California, U.S.
- Died: November 7, 2013 (aged 82); Malibu, California, U.S.
- Occupation: Actor
- Years active: 1958–1998
- Spouse(s): Elizabeth Mott (m. 1952; div. 19??); Diane E. Worth (m. 1961; div. 19??); Ann Newman (m. 1970; div. ??); Suzy Davis (??)

Paul Mantee (born Paul Marianetti; January 9, 1931 – November 7, 2013) was an American film and television actor.

== Biography ==
Mantee was born Paul Marianetti in San Francisco, California. A journalism major at San Mateo Junior College, Mantee enlisted in the U.S. Navy for four years during the Korean War that made him decide on acting as a career. He graduated from the University of California, Berkeley.

His stage name was changed from an Italian-sounding name to the name of Humphrey Bogart's character in The Petrified Forest. He made a great number of guest appearances in well-known television shows and starred in a handful of films, including a cult classic, Robinson Crusoe on Mars. Mantee authored two novels, In Search of the Perfect Ravioli (Ballantine Books, 1991) and a semi-autobiographical Bruno of Hollywood (Ballantine Books, 1994).

Mantee, a longtime Malibu resident, died November 7, 2013, at a rehabilitation center in Canoga Park, California. He was survived by his wife, Suzy Davis Mantee whom he met while standing in line at the Malibu post office.

== Complete filmography ==
- 1958 Onionhead as Sailor (uncredited)
- 1959 Battle of the Coral Sea as Bomber Co-Pilot (uncredited)
- 1964 Robinson Crusoe on Mars as Commander Christopher "Kit" Draper
- 1964 Blood on the Arrow as Segura
- 1966 An American Dream as Shago Martin
- 1968 A Man Called Dagger as Dick Dagger (filmed in 1966)
- 1969 They Shoot Horses, Don't They? as "Jiggs"
- 1973 That Man Bolt as Mickey
- 1975 Breakout as Cable
- 1975 Framed as Frank
- 1976 W.C. Fields and Me as Edward (uncredited)
- 1977 Day of the Animals as Roy Moore
- 1977 The Greatest as Carrara
- 1978 The Manitou as Dr. McEvoy
- 1979 The Great Santini as Colonel Virgil Hedgepath
- 1980 Wolf Lake as Sweeney
- 1985 First Strike
- 1993 Dragon: The Bruce Lee Story as Doctor
- 1994 The Lurking Fear as Father Poole
- 1995 Apollo 13 as Reporter #4
- 1998 Memorial Day as General Willard (final film role)

== Partial TV credits ==
- The Rifleman (1961-1963) - John Wing / Cade Conway
- Cheyenne (1961-1962) - Johnny Crow / Jimmy
- Twelve O'Clock High (1965-1966) - Captain Rice / Lt. Nick Constantinius
- The Invaders (1967) - Deputy Vern Hammond
- Voyage to the Bottom of the Sea (1968) - Jim Bentley
- Days of Our Lives (1965) - Lieutenant Spalding (1975)
- The Fugitive (1966-1967) - Deputy Bob Howe / Jack Burmas
- Rango (1967) - Carter (Episode "The Spy Who Was Out Cold")
- Batman (1967) - Cornell (Episode "Catwoman Goes to College")
- Mission: Impossible (1967-1971) - Bill Fisher / Byron Miller
- Ironside (1968-1975) - Prof. Bradford Link / Asst. D.A. Paul Corey
- Mannix (1968–1975) - Wayborn / Paul / Dave Winters / Frank Viola / Blake / Tommy Gantt / Marcos
- Daniel Boone (1970) - Atawa
- 1972 Adventures of Nick Carter (TV Movie) as O'Hara
- 1973 Call to Danger (TV Movie) as Adams
- 1973 Cry Rape (TV Movie) as Jim Hadley
- The Streets of San Francisco (1973-1975) - Renfro / Baxter
- 1974 Big Rose: Double Trouble (TV Movie) as Troy
- 1974 The Healers (TV Movie)
- 1976 Helter Skelter (TV Movie) as Sergeant O'Neal
- Barnaby Jones (1977-1979) - Jay Tucker / Wallace Brooks
- CHiPs (1977) - Eddie
- Logan's Run (1978) - Barton
- Vega$ (1979, 1981) - Capt. Jim Schmidt / Roy / Sergeant Ross
- Quincy, M.E. (1977-1982) - Nick Ganziano / Perkins / Auto Inspector / Fake Carl Hopwood
- Buck Rogers in the 25th Century (1979)
- 1979 When Hell Was in Session (TV Movie) as Captain Brown
- 1980 Alcatraz: The Whole Shocking Story (TV Movie) as Ordway
- Simon & Simon (1981) - Range Officer
- 1981 Death Ray 2000 (TV Movie) as James Di Giorgio
- Dallas (1983) - General Cochran
- The A-Team (1984) - Chris Thomas
- The Fall Guy (1983-1986) - Quinn / Sergeant Rogers
- Cagney & Lacey (1983-1988) - Al Corassa / Lt. Sandusky
- Scarecrow and Mrs. King (1984) - Perry Lunsford
- Hunter (1989-1991) - Commander Tom Clayton
- L.A. Law (1989) - Judge Mitchell Katlin
- 1992 Illusions (TV Movie) as Professor McRoe
- 1994 Cagney & Lacey: The Return (TV Movie) as Corassa
- Seinfeld (1994) - Health Inspector
