= Victor Lundin =

American singer-songwriter

- Born: December 8, 1929; Chicago, Illinois, U.S.
- Died: July 2, 2013 (aged 83); Los Angeles, California, U.S.
- Other names: Vic Lundin, Raymond Moses
- Years active: 1958–2013

Victor Lundin (December 8, 1929 – July 2, 2013) was an American character actor who is best remembered as appearing in the 1964 science fiction film Robinson Crusoe on Mars as the character Friday and for having later portrayed the first Klingon seen on screen in the Star Trek television franchise. He also appeared in films directed by Robert Wise and George Stevens, as well as in other television series such as Batman and The Time Tunnel.

== Early life ==
Lundin was born in Chicago, Illinois, on Dec 8, 1929. His father was from a German American background, and his mother was English. He wanted to work in films from a young age, after enjoying watching them at the cinema where his father worked. While attending Lane Technical College Prep High School, Lundin trained as an opera singer and was on the baseball team. During this time, he would take on small roles in broadcast radio productions being produced in Chicago, such as Mystery Theater and Captain Midnight. He began to play semi-pro baseball as a pitcher for the Skokie Indians, but an injury to his throwing arm in his second game ended his career.

Lundin began to study music at Roosevelt University, but after a year won a part in the Lyric Opera of Chicago's performance of Don Giovanni, which created an opportunity for him to study abroad in Italy. But he turned this down, instead opting to move to California to pursue his acting dream. He went on to attend Loyola Marymount University in Los Angeles, where he graduated with a B.A. in Communications Arts and Literature. He began to find work in Hollywood, not as an actor but as a singer. He appeared on the variety show Hootenanny as a folk musician and made 24 appearances on The Red Rowe Show in this same capacity. He recorded a handful of songs, later explaining, "We had a couple turntable hits, but the distribution was poor. They didn't get enough going in sales to do an album".

== Acting career ==
While pursuing his acting career, Lundin also worked as a salesman and a food distributor. He became known for his portrayal of tough men on screen, as well as Native Americans. By Lundin's own estimation, he made more than a 100 different film and television appearances from the late 1950s to the late 1960s. These included such roles as Machine Gun Kelly in the 1960s film Ma Barker's Killer Brood. During the early 1960s, he worked with two Academy Award winning directors, Robert Wise and George Stevens. With Wise, he appeared in the director's 1962 film Two for the Seesaw, and in Stevens' The Greatest Story Ever Told in 1965. Lundin also appeared in a number of other films around this same period, including Promises! Promises! (1963) and Beau Geste (1966). In 1964, he also starred in one of the lead roles in Robinson Crusoe on Mars as Friday. During this period, he also worked as a singing coach, working with Lucille Ball for a period, but he said "I couldn't teach her anything. She was such a heavy smoker; she was like a basso profundo".

Lundin appeared in several 1960's science fiction and superhero television series, such as Batman as one of the Penguin's henchmen, and as Chief Standing Pat in separate episodes. In 1967, he appeared in the Star Trek: The Original Series episode "Errand of Mercy", the first time that the Klingons made an appearance in the Star Trek franchise. Lundin portrayed the Klingon Lieutenant, and became the first Klingon to be seen on screen by virtue of walking into frame moments before John Colicos' Kor. Lundin had previously auditioned for the role of Spock, which wound up going to Leonard Nimoy instead. He also appeared in other series such as The Time Tunnel and later in his career in Babylon 5. He was a regular at science fiction conventions, and continued to sing professionally, including making an appearance on a cruise in the early 2000s.

== Personal life and death ==
Lundin married Christa Friedlander in 1961 and had three children; two sons and a daughter. The marriage ended in 1972 and he retained custody of their children. He raised his three children alone and later met Amelia Pryharski with whom he spent the last 20 years of his life. He was involved with charities, including the Child Welfare League of America. Following a lengthy illness, Lundin died on July 2, 2013 in Thousand Oaks, California.

== Filmography ==
=== Feature films ===
Year	Title	Role	Other notes	Ref
1959	The Miracle	Sergeant	Uncredited	
1960	Ma Barker's Killer Brood	Machine Gun Kelly	as Vic Lundin	
1962	Two for the Seesaw	Beat Singer	Uncredited	
1963	Island of Love	Henchman		
1963	Promises! Promises!	Tuglio		
1964	Robinson Crusoe on Mars	Friday		
1965	The Greatest Story Ever Told	Centurion Guard	Uncredited	
1966	Beau Geste	Vachiaro	as Vic Lundin	
1967	Hondo And The Apaches	Silva, an Apache villain	Two episodes from the TV series Hondo, edited together and released as a single feature.	
1976	Super Seal	Man on pier	also credited as writer and producer, Uncredited	
2006	The Theory of Everything	Gene		
2007	Revamped	Professor Van Dyke		

=== Television ===
Year	Title	Role	Other notes	Ref
1959	Gunsmoke	Hank	"The Constable" season 4, episode 37	
1961	Cheyenne	Rustler	"Uncredited"	
1966	Time Tunnel	Kanuso (native on Kratora)	"Crack of Doom"	
1966	Get Smart	Raymond	"The Greatest Spy on Earth"	
1966	Batman	Octopus	"Fine Finny Fiends", "Batman Makes the Scenes"	
1966	Voyage to the Bottom of the Sea	Hansjurg	"The Menfish"	
1967	Star Trek	Lieutenant	"Errand of Mercy"	
1967	The Man From U.N.C.L.E.	Vinay	"The Fiery Angel Affair"	
1968	Mannix	Al	"You Can Get Killed Out There"	
1968	Batman	Chief Standing Pat	"The Great Escape", "The Great Train Robbery"	
1968	Voyage to the Bottom of the Sea	Alien	"The Lobster Man"	
1997	Babylon 5	Psi Corps Official	"Epiphanies"	
2002	Fatal Kiss	Abraham Van Helsing		
