= John C. Higgins =

Canadian-American screenwriter (1908–1995)

- Born: April 28, 1908; Winnipeg, Manitoba, Canada
- Died: July 2, 1995 (aged 87)
- Occupation: Screenwriter

John Clarence Higgins (April 28, 1908 – July 2, 1995) was a Canadian-American screenwriter.

== History ==
During the 1930s and early 1940s, Higgins worked on mostly complex murder mystery films, including the Spencer Tracy film Murder Man (1935). During the late 1940s, Higgins continued to pen thrillers, including semidocumentary-style films such as director Anthony Mann's He Walked By Night, Raw Deal, T-Men and Border Incident.

Higgins also wrote horror films like the Basil Rathbone starrer The Black Sleep (1956) and an early Tom Selleck film, Daughters of Satan (1972). Higgins also wrote the science fiction film Robinson Crusoe on Mars (1964) and the adventure film Impasse (1969).
