= The Black Sleep =

1956 film by Reginald LeBorg

- Theatrical release poster
- Directed by: Reginald LeBorg
- Written by: John C. Higgins
- Based on: story by Gerald Drayson Adams
- Produced by: Howard W. Koch executive Aubrey Schenck
- Starring: Basil Rathbone; Akim Tamiroff; Lon Chaney Jr. John Carradine; Bela Lugosi; Herbert Rudley; Tor Johnson
- Narrated by: Basil Rathbone
- Cinematography: Gordon Avil
- Edited by: John Schreyer
- Music by: Les Baxter
- Production company: Bel-Air Productions (Prospect Productions)
- Distributed by: United Artists
- Release date: June 1956
- Running time: 82 minutes
- Country: United States
- Language: English
- Budget: $225,000

The Black Sleep (American reissue title Dr. Cadman's Secret) is a 1956 American independent horror film produced by Bel Air Productions, directed by Reginald LeBorg, and written by John C. Higgins from a story by Gerald Drayson Adams. It stars Basil Rathbone, Lon Chaney Jr., John Carradine, Bela Lugosi, and Akim Tamiroff. Tor Johnson appears in a supporting role. The film was produced by Aubrey Schenck and Howard W. Koch, as part of a four-picture finance-for-distribution arrangement with United Artists.

The film was released in the US in June 1956 as a double feature with the 1955 British film The Quatermass Xperiment (which was retitled The Creeping Unknown in the US). The Black Sleep was re-released in 1962 under the title Dr. Cadman's Secret on a double feature with Voodoo Island (which at that point was retitled Silent Death).

== Plot ==
In a London prison in 1872, Dr. Gordon Ramsay is awaiting execution for the murder of a man named Curry, despite his claims of innocence. He is visited by renowned surgeon Sir Joel Cadman, who offers him a chance to save his life in exchange for assisting Cadman with experiments at his estate. Cadman gives Ramsay a potion that he calls "The Black Sleep," which induces a deathlike state that can lead to actual death if an antidote is not administered in time. The next morning, Ramsay is discovered in his cell, apparently dead, and Cadman takes the body, supposedly for burial, with his assistant Odo.

When Ramsay is revived at Cadman's estate, he is startled by screams from a young woman named Laurie, who is being attacked by a large man named Mungo. The only person who can control Mungo is Cadman's nurse, Daphne, who quiets the attacker and leads him away. Later, Cadman and Daphne visit the bedroom of Cadman's wife Angelina, who is comatose from an inoperable brain tumor. Cadman vows that he will find a way to operate on Angelina and save her life. However, when he next meets with Ramsay, Cadman tells him that he is conducting experiments on human brains to help restore creatures like Mungo and his mute servant Casimir to normal condition. Mungo, it turns out, was actually a Doctor Monroe, one of Ramsay's former teachers, whom Cadman claims he is trying to help through his research.

In a hidden laboratory/operating room in the manor, Ramsay observes Cadman's experiment on a man's brain, with Lucy and Daphne assisting. He is taken aback, though, when he sees cerebral fluid leaking from the subject's exposed brain, indicating that he is still alive. Cadman regards potential brain injury as a necessary risk for the greater good that his experiments will produce, testing different regions of the brain to map their functions. That night, though, Laurie tells Ramsay that she thinks she can trust him and that she is actually Dr. Monroe's daughter. Her father's current state as "Mungo" was caused by an operation by Cadman. When confronted by Ramsay, Cadman admits that he was responsible and says that he is working to reverse and atone for his mistakes, but he does not mention his wife and her condition.

Back in London, Odo has slipped the Black Sleep potion to a woman who knows the truth about the man Curry whom Ramsay was alleged to have killed. When the police arrive looking for her, Odo claims not to know where she is and disposes of the antidote that could revive her. At Cadman's manor, Ramsay and Laurie have concluded that Cadman's last subject was the still-living Curry and seek further evidence. In a hidden dungeon, they find locked cells with other living subjects of Cadman's experiments, all now mad and disfigured. Cadman, Daphne, Mungo, and Casimir capture Ramsay and Laurie but drop the cell keys as they leave.

Cadman reveals Angelina's condition to Ramsay. He had expected to conduct an operation that required a second woman subject, but when he learns that Odo had let the intended victim die, decides to use Laurie instead at Odo's suggestion. Cadman is interrupted, though, by the arrival of police detectives looking for Odo. Meanwhile, Ramsay tries to revive the anesthetized Laurie and manages to drug Mungo while Daphne is out of the room. The nurse herself is confronted by Cadman's victims, who have escaped from the dungeon with the dropped keys. Led by a subject who believes he is Bohemund the Crusader, they cast Daphne into the fireplace, from which she rises, aflame and screaming.

Ramsay revives Laurie but Mungo awakens at the same time and attacks her. He is stopped, though, by the surging group of victims who then turn on Cadman as he enters the room with his comatose wife. Backing away, Cadman falls over stair rail and plunges to his death with Angelina. The police finally arrive with Odo and Casimir in custody, and Ramsay and Laurie depart as a new day breaks.

== Cast ==
- Basil Rathbone as Sir Joel Cadman
- Akim Tamiroff as Odo the Gypsy
- Herbert Rudley as Dr. Gordon Ramsay
- Patricia Blake as Laurie Munroe
- Phyllis Stanley as Daphnae
- Lon Chaney Jr. as Dr. Munroe aka Mungo
- John Carradine as Bohemund
- Bela Lugosi as Casimir
- Tor Johnson as Mr. Curry
- George Sawaya as Sailor Subject
- Sally Yarnell as Female Subject
- Peter Gordon as Det. Sgt. Steele
- Claire Carleton as Carmoda Daily
- John Sheffield as Det. Redford
- Clive Morgan as Roundsman Blevins
- Louanna Gardner as Angelina Cadman
- Aubrey Schenck as Prison Coroner's Aide (uncredited)

== Production ==
Producer Howard W. Koch described the film's genesis as typical of his arrangement with United Artists, with script, cast, and other elements being driven by the budget given by the company. Initial director Allen H. Miner was replaced by Reginald LeBorg because of LeBorg's previous experience with horror films. LeBorg also added dialogue to a scene with Dr. Cadman discussing his wife in order to increase an element of sympathy with the character and consulted with a neurosurgeon to create realistic details of Cadman's operation on a living brain.

The film marked Bela Lugosi's last complete role before his death in August 1956, although some scenes featuring Lugosi shot later than the filming of The Black Sleep were included in Ed Wood's Plan 9 from Outer Space (in which Tor Johnson also appears), completed in 1957 but not released for distribution until 1959.

Bela Lugosi, among the pantheon of horror film actors, was ill during shooting and recovering from a drug addiction. Due to his condition, director LeBorg consigned him to the role of the deaf-mute manservant "Casimir." According to film historian Wheeler W. Dixon:

Lugosi insisted on having some lines of dialogue, and LeBorg complied by shooting a few close-ups of him, albeit without sound, simply to pacify the actor; these takes ended up on the cutting room floor.

== Release ==
Produced during 1955, the film was released to theaters in June 1956. This was just ahead of the TV syndication, through Screen Gems, of two decades of Universal monster movies, under the package title Shock Theater. Writer Higgins, director LeBorg, and stars Rathbone, Chaney, Carradine, and Lugosi had all been significantly associated with Universal horror films or related B movies. In its casting, The Black Sleep is similar to Universal's two "houseful" of monster films released in the mid-40s, House of Frankenstein and House of Dracula, only relying on a completely new cadre of human monsters.

On its double bill with The Creeping Unknown in 1956, The Black Sleep was financially successful, with the two films earning $1,200,000 more than their total cost.

== Reception ==
Among contemporary reviews, Variety wrote that the film "plays the horror tale fairly straight so what's happening is not too illogical until the finale wrapup, when all restraint comes off and the melodramatics run amok. ...Basil Rathbone is quite credible as the surgeon, enough so that the brain operations he performs will horrify many viewers"; and The Motion Picture Exhibitor noted that "Rathbone has a grand time as the mad scientist, assisted nobly by some of the best names in the horror field. Audiences should be frightened plenty, and past experience proves that this can mean good grosses... Sure, a lot of it is corny, but it is all good fun in a grisly, frightening manner."

John Stanley calls the film "Barely watchable, despite a zoo-like cast.". According to Michael Weldon, "Never before (or since) have so many horror actors been brought together and told to act like mongoloids. Never have so many actors been wasted. Only Basil Rathbone and Akim Tamiroff get to play semirational characters."

== Home media ==
The Black Sleep was released by Kino Lorber on Blu-ray in 2016 and contains audio commentary by Tom Weaver and David Schecter.

== See also ==
- List of American films of 1956
