= Ripcord (TV series) =

1961–1963 American television series

- Genre: Adventure
- Created by: Harry Redmond Jr.; James Carl (Jim) Hall
- Directed by: Leon Benson; Jack Herzberg
- Presented by: Larry Pennell
- Starring: Larry Pennell; Ken Curtis; Paul Comi; Shug Fisher
- Narrated by: Larry Pennell
- Theme music composer: Judith Pines
- Country of origin: United States
- Original language: English
- No. of seasons: 2
- No. of episodes: 76 (38 in black-and-white, season 1; 38 in color, season 2)

Production
- Executive producers: Ivan Tors; Babe Unger
- Producers: Leon Benson; Stanley Colbert; Maurice Unger
- Camera setup: Single-camera
- Running time: 30 minutes
- Production companies: Ziv Television Programs (first 38 episodes); Rapier Productions Incorporated and United Artists Television (last 38 episodes)

Original release
- Network: Syndication
- Release: June 3, 1961 – September 1, 1963

Ripcord is an American syndicated television series starring Larry Pennell, with Ken Curtis, which ran for a total of 76 episodes from 1961 to 1963 about the exploits of a skydiving operation of its namesake.

== Premise ==
The premise is a variety of adventures surrounding the then-new, thrilling sport of skydiving. The two men and their private Cessna airplane are placed in unusual situations where their special skills and abilities were needed. This leads them on exciting weekly adventures from chasing dangerous criminals to performing difficult and daring, if occasionally absurd, rescues.

== Cast ==
- Larry Pennell as Theodore "Ted" McKeever (skydiver) handsome, audacious, intrepid, clever, courageous, cunning, headstrong, brave.
- Ken Curtis as James "Jim" Buckley (skydiver) older, level-headed mentor and best buddy to Ted McKeever.
- Paul Comi as Chuck Lambert (airplane pilot) - this character was phased out midway through first season, replaced by...
- Shug Fisher as Charlie Kern (airplane pilot) - replaced the Chuck Lambert character played by Paul Comi midway through the first season.

Fisher and Curtis were bandmates in the musical group Sons of the Pioneers. Curtis was later Marshall Dillon's bumbling deputy Festus Hagin in Gunsmoke. Pennell, on the other hand, guest starred as handsome movie star Dash Riprock in ten episodes of The Beverly Hillbillies between 1965 and 1969.

== Production ==
The stuntmen performing the actual skydiving were Bob Fleming, an airline pilot, and Joe Mangione, both from Brooklyn, New York. Fleming also doubled as the pilot at the controls when not involved in the scene.

Cameramen included Tom Ryan, whose previous experience included early parachute development, testing, and design. Ryan was a pioneer in capturing closeup film footage of free-falling skydivers.

In 1962, the filming of the series involved the transfer of a stuntman between two airplanes, which was being filmed from a third aircraft. Due to air turbulence, the transfer failed and both aircraft touched and subsequently crashed. The pilots of both airplanes and the stuntman involved were able to parachute to safety. Later, the dramatic footage from this near tragic event was subsequently used in a Ripcord second season two-parter episode.

== Episodes ==
=== Season 1 (1961–1962) ===
No. overall	No. in season	Title	Directed by	Written by	Original release date
1	1	"The Sky Diver" "Pilot"	Alexander Singer	Arthur Weiss	September 28, 1961
Guest star: Russell Johnson.
2	2	"Air Carnival"	James Clavell	Vance Skarstedt	1961
Guest stars: Stuart Erwin, Carol Ohmart, Willis Bouchey, and Med Flory.
3	3	"Airborne"	Eddie Davis	E.M. Parsons	1961
4	4	"Chuting Stars"	Monroe Askins	Vernon E. Clark	1961
Guest star: John Agar.
5	5	"Colorado Jump"	TBD	TBD	1961
6	6	"The Condemned"	James Clavell	Joanne Court	1961
Guest star: Michael Pataki.
7	7	"Counter-Attack"	TBD	TBD	1961
8	8	"Crime Jump"	Unknown	Unknown	October 5, 1961
Guest star: Burt Reynolds.
9	9	"Dangerous Night" "DARB (Distressed Airman Rescue Beacon)"	TBD	TBD	1961
Guest star: Harry Townes.
10	10	"Death Camp"	TBD	TBD	1961
11	11	"Derelict"	TBD	TBD	1961
12	12	"Top Secret"	TBD	TBD	1961
13	13	"Radar Rescue"	Unknown	Unknown	December 28, 1961
Guest stars: John Considine and Jack Hogan.
14	14	"Sierra Jump"	TBD	TBD	1962
15	15	"The Silver Cord"	William Conrad	Mann Rubin	1962
16	16	"Thoroughbred"	TBD	TBD	1962
17	17	"Ransom Drop"	Leon Benson	E.M. Parsons	1962
Guest star: Tracy Olsen.
18	18	"Escape"	Leon Benson	Stanley H. Silverman	1962
19	19	"Double Drop"	TBD	TBD	1962
20	20	"The Financier"	TBD	TBD	1962
21	21	"Sentence of Death"	TBD	TBD	1962
22	22	"Desperate Choice"	Eddie Davis	Teddi Sherman	1962
23	23	"Diplomatic Mission"	Eddie Davis	Don Archer	1962
Guest star: Richard Simmons.
24	24	"Hagen Charm"	Eddie Davis	Teddi Sherman	1962
Guest star: Arthur Franz.
25	25	"The Helicopter Race"	Monroe Askins	Vernon E. Clark	March 15, 1962
Guest star: Dyan Cannon
26	26	"Jungle Survivor"	James Clavell	A.M. Zweibach	1962
27	27	"High Jeopardy"	Franklin Adreon	Sam Cobb	1962
28	28	"Hi-Jack"	James Clavell	Sam Cobb	1962
29	29	"The Human Kind"	Franklin Adreon	Stephen Kandel	1962
30	30	"Hurricane Charley"	Leon Benson	Lee Erwin	1962
31	31	"Elegy for a Hero"	Leon Benson	Stuart Jerome	1962
32	32	"Cougar Mesa"	TBD	TBD	1962
33	33	"Last Chance"	Franklin Adreon	Lee Erwin	1962
34	34	"Log Jam"	Leon Benson	Story by : Denis Sanders; Teleplay by : Stanley H. Silverman	1962
35	35	"Mile High Triangle"	Eddie Davis	Story by : Arthur Blanc; Teleplay by : Robert Warnes Leach & S.H. Silverman	May 31, 1962
Guest stars: Walter Mathews, Page Slattery, Robert Sampson and Kathie Browne.
36	36	"Millionaire Doctor"	TBD	TBD	1962
37	37	"One for the Money"	Leon Benson	Story by : David P. Harmon; Teleplay by : Frank Granville & David P. Harmon	1962
38	38	"Para-Nurse"	Leon Benson	E.M. Parsons	1962
Guest stars: Harry Carey Jr. and Allison Hayes.

=== Season 2 (1962–63) ===
No. overall	No. in season	Title	Directed by	Written by	Original release date
39	1	"Aerial Backfire"	Leon Benson	Edward J. Lakso	October 18, 1962
40	2	"Among Those Missing"	Babe Unger	Story by : Teddi Sherman; Teleplay by : Teddi Sherman & Robert Barry	October 25, 1962
41	3	"Chute to Kill"	TBD	TBD	1962
42	4	"Day of the Hunter"	TBD	TBD	1962
43	5	"Devil's Canyon"	Monroe Askins	Story by : Stanley H. Silverman; Teleplay by : Steve Fisher & Stanley H. Silverman	1962
44	6	"Expose"	TBD	TBD	1962
45	7	"The Final Jump"	Unknown	Unknown	April 16, 1963
46	8	"Flight for Life"	TBD	TBD	1962
47	9	"Flight to Terror"	TBD	TBD	1962
48	10	"A Free Falling Star"	Monroe Askins	Jon Epstein & Adam Hill	1962
49	11	"Hostage Below"	Leon Benson	Ernest Spaulding	1962
50	12	"The Hunter"	TBD	TBD	1962
51	13	"Infiltration"	Leon Benson	Vernon E. Clark	1963
52	14	"The Inventor"	TBD	TBD	1963
53	15	"Jump or Die"	TBD	TBD	1963
54	16	"Jump to a Blind Alley"	Leon Benson	TBD	1963
55	17	"Jump to Freedom"	TBD	TBD	1963
56	18	"Man on a Mountain"	Leon Benson	Teddi Sherman	1963
57	19	"The Last Chapter"	Unknown	Unknown	January 15, 1963
58	20	"The Losers"	Eddie Davis	Steve Fisher	1963
59	21	"The Lost Ones"	TBD	TBD	1963
60	22	"The Lost Tribe"	TBD	TBD	1963
61	23	"Million Dollar Drop"	TBD	TBD	1963
62	24	"The Money Mine"	Unknown	Unknown	January 3, 1963
Guest star: Lee Van Cleef.
63	25	"Panic at 10,000"	TBD	TBD	1963
64	26	"Picture of Terror"	Leon Benson	Steve Fisher	1963
65	27	"A Present for Felipe"	TBD	TBD	1963
66	28	"The Proud Little Man"	TBD	TBD	1963
67	29	"Race Morgan: Bounty Hunter"	TBD	TBD	1963
68	30	"Reprisal"	Jack Herzberg	Edward J. Lakso	1963
69	31	"Run, Joby, Run"	Monroe Askins	Edward J. Lakso	1963
70	32	"Semper Paratus Any Time"	TBD	TBD	1963
71	33	"The Suicide Club"	TBD	TBD	1963
72	34	"The Trouble with Denny Collins"	Monroe Askins	Steve Fisher	1963
73	35	"The Well"	Jack Herzberg	Karl Daniels	1963
74	36	"Where Do Elephants Go to Die?"	TBD	Harlan Ellison	1963
75	37	"Willie"	Jack Herzberg	Story by : Sid Harris; Teleplay by : Steve Fisher	March 26, 1963
Guest star: Dawn Wells.
76	38	"Wrong Way Down"	Leon Benson	Don Brinkley	1963

== International broadcast ==
Ripcord aired in Brazil in the 1960s under its original title at the same time as in the United States.

Ripcord aired in the UK (under its original title) on BBC1 in 1964, with repeats airing the following year until October 1965.

== Home media ==
On July 23, 2013, TGG Direct released both seasons of Ripcord as a Region 1 DVD.

Some of the Ripcord episodes can be found on YouTube, Veoh and Uncle Earl's Classic Television Channel.

== Comic ==
Ray Bailey adapted the series into a comic strip.

== Toy ==
This show sponsored a popular Ripcord tie-in toy, consisting of a large plastic parachute with a plastic skydiver figure attached to it, which could be thrown in the air and would float down to the ground, just like a real parachute. It was a big toy seller. At the end of every episode, Larry Pennell as Theodore (Ted) McKeever, along with Ken Curtis as James (Jim) Buckley, delivered a brief comment, addressing to viewers the importance of sport parachuting safety.
