= Hell's Horizon =

1955 American war film directed by Tom Gries

- Theatrical poster
- Directed by: Tom Gries
- Written by: Tom Gries
- Produced by: Wray Davis
- Starring: John Ireland
- Cinematography: Floyd Crosby
- Edited by: Aaron Stell
- Music by: Heinz Roemheld
- Production companies: Columbia Pictures Corporation; Gravis Productions
- Distributed by: Columbia Pictures
- Release date: 1955; (Note: Hell's Horizon has been variously listed as a 1955 release with two different release dates.)
- Running time: 80 minutes
- Country: United States
- Language: English

Hell's Horizon is a 1955 American war film written and directed by Tom Gries. The film stars John Ireland and Marla English. Hell's Horizon recounts the story of a bomber crew in the Korean War.

== Plot ==
During the Korean War, United States Air Force Captain John Merrill (John Ireland) is the pilot of a Boeing B-29 Superfortress bomber. Merrill is based in Okinawa and is ordered to destroy a Yalu River bridge in Korea. The mission is continually delayed due to bad weather. His co-pilot (Bill Williams) has to step in when the bored and frustrated crew members begin to fight over Sammi (Marla English), a local woman who is employed as a laundress at their base.

When the weather finally clears over the target, Merrill is ordered to attack the strategic bridge, but with only cloud cover as his protection. The North Koreans are prepared, and anti-aircraft guns hit the bomber as it descends out of the clouds. The attack is a success, but some crew members are killed, including "Jockey" (Chet Baker), the popular trumpeter of the base. Others on board are wounded. Merrill has to contend not only with the damaged bomber, but also flying through a deadly storm.

The bomber returns to base with extensive damage and only one engine still working, so Merrill has to make a "pancake" landing. (Note: A pancake landing is an emergency landing with the landing gear retracted.) The survivors make it back in time to hear the announcement of Sammi's engagement to one of the crew, Sgt. "Buddy" Lewis (Larry Pennell).

== Cast ==
- John Ireland as Capt. John Merrill
- Marla English as Sammi
- Bill Williams as Paul Jenkins
- Hugh Beaumont as Sgt. Al Trask
- Larry Pennell as Sgt. "Buddy" Lewis
- Chet Baker as "Jockey" (Note: The opening film credits list him as "... and introducing Chet Baker and his trumpet.")

== Production ==
Hell's Horizon relied on a large amount of stock footage.

== Reception ==
Despite its release only a few years after the end of the Korean War, Hell's Horizon was no more than a typical B war film. Reviewer Alun Evans summed it up as a "standard action drama of a single bomber raid in the Korean conflict with no redeeming features." In Leonard Maltin's review, he merely noted, "Interaction among men of bombing squad in the Korean War."

== See also ==
- List of American films of 1955

== Bibliography ==
- Evans, Alun. Brassey's Guide to War Films. Dulles, Virginia: Potomac Books, 2000. ISBN 1-57488-263-5.
