= The Sea Hornet =

1951 American adventure film by Joseph Kane

- Theatrical release poster
- Directed by: Joseph Kane
- Screenplay by: Gerald Drayson Adams
- Story by: Gerald Drayson Adams
- Produced by: Joseph Kane
- Starring: Rod Cameron; Adele Mara; Lorna Gray; Chill Wills; Jim Davis; Richard Jaeckel
- Cinematography: Bert Glennon
- Edited by: Tony Martinelli
- Music by: R. Dale Butts
- Production company: Republic Pictures
- Distributed by: Republic Pictures
- Release date: November 6, 1951
- Running time: 84 minutes
- Country: United States
- Language: English

The Sea Hornet is a 1951 American adventure film directed by Joseph Kane, written by Gerald Drayson Adams and starring Rod Cameron, Adele Mara, Lorna Gray, Chill Wills, Jim Davis and Richard Jaeckel. The film was released on November 6, 1951 by Republic Pictures.

== Plot ==
A deep-sea salvage diver inspects a merchant ship that was reported sunk by a torpedo off the California coast during World War II with a million dollars in gold on board and becomes romantically involved. His buddy is killed while attempting to blow up the sunken ship.

== Cast ==
- Rod Cameron as Gunner McNeil
- Adele Mara as Suntan Radford / Goldbraid
- Lorna Gray as Ginger Sullivan
- Chill Wills as Swede
- Jim Davis as Tony Sullivan
- Richard Jaeckel as Johnny Radford
- Ellen Corby as Mrs. Drinkwater
- James Brown as Pete Hunter
- Grant Withers as Rocky Lowe
- William Ching as Sprowl
- William Haade as Condor
- Hal Taliaferro as Bone
- Emil Sitka as Waiter
- Byron Foulger as Clerk
- Monte Blue as Lt. Drake
- Jack Pennick as Salty
