= Larry Pennell =

American actor

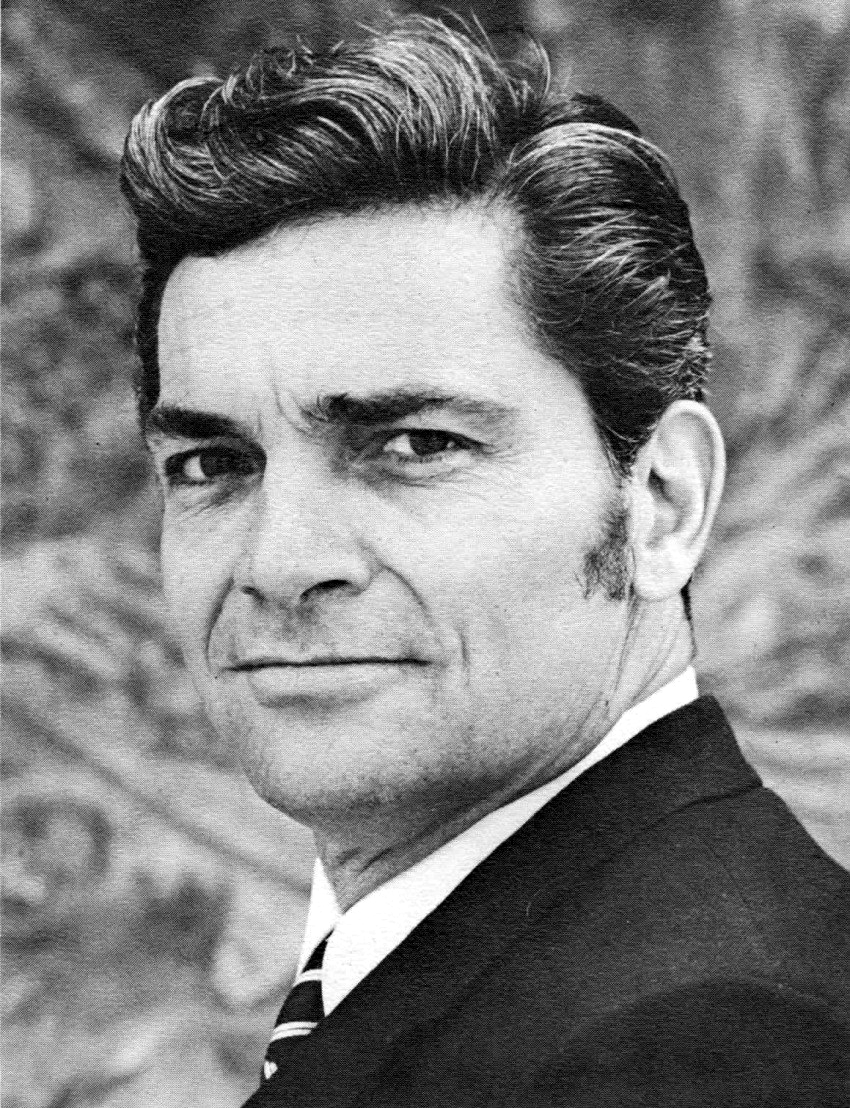
- Born: Lawrence Kenneth Pennell; February 21, 1928; Uniontown, Pennsylvania, US
- Died: August 28, 2013 (aged 85); Santa Monica, California, U.S.
- Other name: Bud Pennell
- Occupations: Film and television actor Professional baseball player
- Years active: 1955–2011
- Spouse: Patricia Throop
- Children: Melanie

Lawrence Kenneth Pennell (February 21, 1928 – August 28, 2013) was an American television and film actor, often remembered for his role as Dash Riprock in the television series The Beverly Hillbillies. His career spanned half a century, including starring in the first-run syndicated adventure series Ripcord in the leading role of skydiver Theodore "Ted" McKeever, and as Keith Holden in Lassie. He was also a baseball player, playing on scholarship for the University of Southern California (USC) and later professionally for the Boston Braves organization.

== Early life and education ==
Pennell was born in Uniontown, Pennsylvania to entrepreneur Harold Pennell and homemaker Ruth Pennell. His parents moved to Niagara Falls, New York during the Great Depression in search of better opportunities. After a short time in New York, the family moved to California. They lived in a studio apartment overlooking Angels Flight in Downtown Los Angeles. His family moved again when he was still young, purchasing a home near Paramount Studios in Hollywood. He became a newsboy on the studio lot, but athletics distracted him from any early interest in film.

Pennell played baseball throughout his youth. He attended Hollywood High School, at which he played first base and was later inducted into the school's athletic hall of fame. He was recruited by Rod Dedeaux to play baseball at USC, where he began playing in 1947. Pennell attended the university on a full baseball scholarship and became one of the school's all-time letter winners. He left school early to play professionally for the Boston Braves organization, from 1948 to 1953.

== Baseball career ==
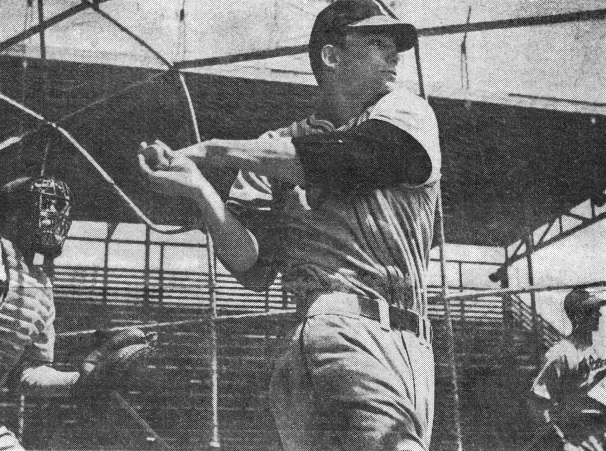
Larry Pennell playing with the Evansville Braves in 1949.

Just shy of graduating from USC, Pennell left the university to play professionally for the Boston Braves organization. During his time with the organization, his teammates often referred to him as "Bud", a nickname that stuck with him throughout his life. He was with the organization for a total of seven seasons between 1948 and 1954, playing first base and outfield for the Evansville Braves, Boston's minor league affiliate.

In his first year in professional ball, he broke the Appalachian League record for runs batted in with 147 and hit .338 for the season while hitting 18 home runs. He was portrayed in Hall of Famer, Eddie Mathews' autobiography, as a "fun-loving teammate." He did not play during the 1950–1953 seasons due to his service during the Korean War. He served in counterintelligence in the U.S. Army and received an honorable discharge upon completion of his service. Upon his return home, his baseball contract was purchased by the Brooklyn Dodgers. Pennell never reported to spring training for the Dodgers and instead decided to pursue acting, a career he had dabbled in during the offseason. Regarding his retirement from baseball, sportswriter Furman Bisher was quoted as saying "his future seemed unlimited...I shall always be frustrated by a desire to know how great a star he might have become."

== Acting career ==
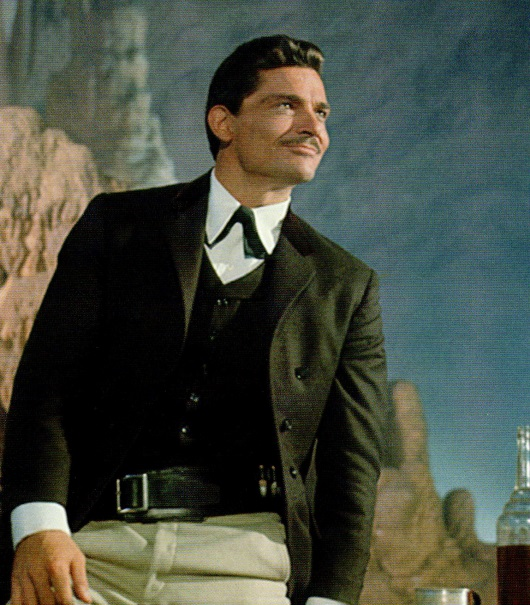
Larry Pennell as General Jack O' Neal in Old Surehand

In the baseball off-seasons, Pennell returned home to Hollywood. Shortly after his contract was purchased by the Brooklyn organization, he decided not to report to spring training and instead began his career in films. After being seen by a talent scout, Pennell got a screen test at Paramount Pictures where he went under contract. Then he traveled to New York City to learn from drama teachers such as Sanford Meisner and Stella Adler.

It was in 1955 when Pennell's acting career was launched. He appeared in his first role as Oliver Brown in the movie Seven Angry Men, a film about abolitionist John Brown, starring Raymond Massey. That role led him to a lead in Hell's Horizon, which was followed by The Far Horizons, starred Charlton Heston and Donna Reed. His next film role was as George Crandall opposite James Stewart in The FBI Story.

Other roles followed, including the leading role as Johnny Jargin in the car racing adventure movie The Devil's Hairpin. Early in his acting career, Pennell went to Europe to appear in films, including Old Surehand, a German production based upon a Karl May's novel. In European films he was occasionally credited as Alessandro Pennelli. He returned to the United States and made guest appearances in several western television series such as Dick Powell's Zane Grey Theatre, Death Valley Days, Have Gun – Will Travel, Wagon Train, Bat Masterson, The Big Valley, The Virginian, Gunsmoke, Bonanza, Rango, Custer, Branded, The Rough Riders, Cimarron City and Tombstone Territory.

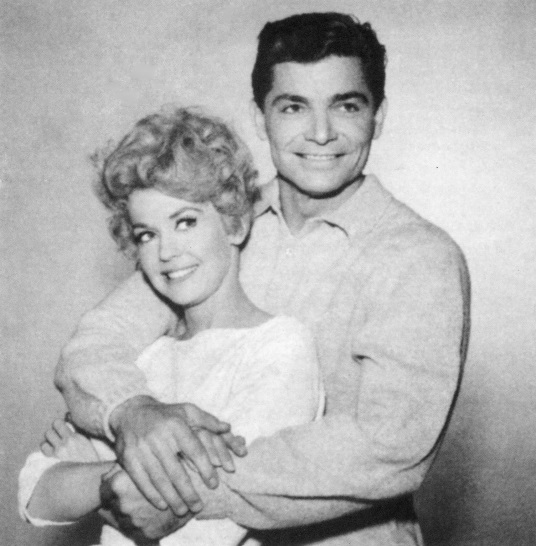
Larry Pennell as Dash Riprock with Donna Douglas as Elly May from The Beverly Hillbillies, ca. 1967

In 1961, he landed the leading role on the television series Ripcord as the handsome skydiver Theodore (Ted) McKeever. His co-star was Ken Curtis, later as Festus Hagen on Gunsmoke, as his inseparable, level-headed older mentor and best buddy James (Jim) Buckley. Ripcord ran for a total of 76 half-hour episodes from 1961 to 1963 and inspired a range of tie-in merchandise such as toy parachutes, action figures, jigsaw puzzles, board games, clean slates, reading books, comic books and coloring books, to name a few. More television guest appearances followed on The Outer Limits, Thriller, The Millionaire, The West Point Story, Wire Service, The Case of the Dangerous Robin, Steve Canyon, Sea Hunt, The Aquanauts, The Everglades, Adventures in Paradise, Dragnet, and Suspense Theater.

As Dash Riprock on The Beverly Hillbillies, he appeared in ten episodes as a film star courting Elly May Clampett (Donna Douglas). After The Beverly Hillbillies, Pennell guest-starred in other television series like Blue Light, My Friend Tony, Mayberry, R.F.D., Family Affair, Land of the Giants, Bracken's World, BJ and the Bear and Salvage 1.

Pennell travelled to Europe in 1965 where he starred Our Man in Jamaica and Old Surehand.

Throughout his career, Pennell appeared in a variety of genres in television series and movies. He was cast in a lead role as Keith Holden in 1972 in the CBS series Lassie. He made guest-starring appearances in various shows, including Mannix, Longstreet, Hunter, Banacek, Mission: Impossible, The Streets of San Francisco, McMillan and Wife, Magnum, P.I., The Rookies, Little House on the Prairie, Owen Marshall: Counselor at Law, O'Hara, U.S. Treasury, Run, Joe, Run, Apple's Way, Silk Stalkings, Diagnosis Murder, Quantum Leap and Firefly and soap operas such as General Hospital and The Young and the Restless.

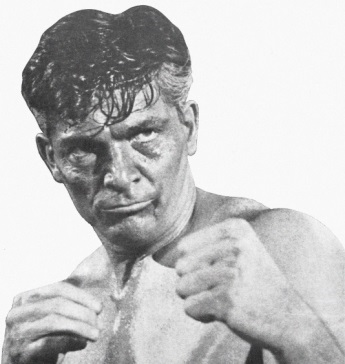
Larry Pennell as Jack Kilbaine in The Big Valley: The Price of Victory

Pennell's film credits include roles in films such as The Great White Hope (1970), starring James Earl Jones and Jane Alexander in which Pennell played former heavyweight champion Frank Brady. Pennell also appeared in the big budget World War II film Midway (1976), as Captain Cyril Simard, alongside Charlton Heston and Henry Fonda. He had roles in other major films such as The Revengers, Journey Through Rosebud and Matilda. Pennell bore a striking resemblance to Clark Gable and played the actor in three roles. One of his notable roles as Gable was in the television film Marilyn: The Untold Story (1980). It was said of his work in that role "Pennell's performance is a little gem." In 1992, Pennell and Tom Selleck rejoined for a third time to appear in Mr. Baseball. Other films include The Fear (1999), Bubba Ho-Tep (2002) starring Ossie Davis, Five Minutes (2002), Last Confession (2005), Seasons of Life (2006) and The Passing (2011).

Pennell experimented with his acting with drama teachers such as Milton Katselis and Daniel Mann. Pennell's stage work encompassed over 50 plays, including The Poker Game, Desperate Hours, Pieces of Time and Dead Autumn's Soul. He wrote and starred in The Signing and Close-Up and won best actor at The Method Fest 2002 for his work in the short film Five Minutes. Throughout his career, Pennell accumulated over 400 credits in roles across stage, film and television as well as commercials and print advertisements.

== Filmography ==
=== Selected film credits ===
Year	Title	Medium	Role	Notes
1955	Seven Angry Men	Western film	Oliver Brown	
1955	The Far Horizons	Western film	Wild Eagle	
1955	Hell's Horizon	Drama film	Buddy Lewis	
1955	The Court Jester	Comedy film	Novice Knight	uncredited
1956	The Vagabond King	Musical film	Soldier	uncredited
1957	The Devil's Hairpin	Adventure film	Johnny Jargin	
1958	The Space Children	Science fiction film	Major Thomas	
1959	The FBI Story	Drama film	George Crandall	
1965	Our Man in Jamaica	Adventure film	Ken Stewart (as Alessandro Pennelli)	
1965	Old Surehand	Western film	General Jack O'Neal	
1970	The Great White Hope	Drama film	Frank Brady	
1970	Brother, Cry for Me	Adventure film	Jim Noble	
1972	Journey Through Rosebud	Drama film	Sheriff	
1972	The Revengers	Western film	Arny	
1973	Lassie: Joyous Sound	TV movie	Keith Holden	
1976	Helter Skelter	TV movie	Sgt. White	
1976	Midway		Captain Cyril Simard	
1978	Matilda		Lee Dockerty	
1979	Elvis	TV movie	Paul Beaulieu	
1980	The Man with Bogart's Face		George	
1980	Marilyn: The Untold Story	TV movie	Clark Gable	
1982	Personal Best		Rick Cahill	
1982	Superstition		George Leahy	
1983	The Night the Bridge Fell Down		Chief Barrett	
1983	Metalstorm: The Destruction of Jared-Syn	Science fiction film	Aix	
1987	Ghost Chase	Drama film	Bum	
1989	Another Chance	Drama film	Clark Gable	
1991	The Borrower	Horror film	Captain Scarcelli	
1992	Mr. Baseball	Film	Howie Gold	
1999	The Fear: Resurrection	Horror film	Grandfather	
1999	Forgiven	Short film	Potter	
2001	The Cross	Drama film	Man with Lamb	
2001	5 Minutes	Short film	Harkness	
2001	Jackpot	Comedy drama film	Truck driver	
2002	Rogue	Drama film	The Voice	
2002	Bubba Ho-Tep	Comedy horror film	Kemosabe	
2005	Last Confession	Short film	Father Conklin	
2006	Seasons of Life	Film	Lauren's Father	
2011	The Passing	Horror film	Charles	(final film role)

=== Selected television credits ===
Year	Title	Medium	Role	Notes
1956	General Electric Theater	Television series	Ealter Kellen	
1956	Studio 57	Television series	Bruce	
1956–1957	The West Point Story	Television series	Bob Matson and Marson	1 w/ Leonard Nimoy
1956	Wire Service	Television series	Johnny	
1957	Schlitz Playhouse	Television series	Bob	
1958–1960	The Millionaire	Television series	Larry Maxwell	
1958	Tombstone Territory	Television series	Bill Doolin	
1958	Steve Canyon	Television series	Lt. Hawk Cameron	
1958	The Rough Riders	Television series	Creed Pearce	
1958	Cimarron City	Television series	Drew McGowan	
1958	Have Gun – Will Travel	Television series	Henry Carver	
1959	Adventures in Paradise	Television series	Dr. Patrick Donovan	
1960	The Alaskans	Television series	Harry Seattle	
1960	Tales of Wells Fargo	Television series	Ben Hardie	
1960	The Aquanauts	Television series	Tyler Sack	Episode: "The Paradivers"
1960	Death Valley Days	Television anthology series	Roner Maxwell	Episode: "Queen of the High-Rollers"
1960	Klondike	Television series	Rule Lukas	
1960	Zane Grey Theater	Television series	Jason Tully	Episode: "The Black Wagon" with Esther Williams
1961	Outlaws	Television series	Bob Dalton	
1961	Thriller	Television series	Larry Weeks	Episode: "Late Date"
1961	The Case of the Dangerous Robin	Television series		
1961	Bat Masterson	Television series	Cal Beamus	
1961	Sea Hunt	Television series	Steve / A counterfeiter leader	Episode: "The Meet"
1961–1963	Ripcord	Television series	Skydiver Theodore (Ted) McKeever	76 episodes
1963	General Hospital	Television series	Hank Pulaski	Unknown episodes
1964	Wagon Train	Television series	Marshal Trace McCloud	Episode: "The Trace McCloud Story"
1964	The Outer Limits	Television series	Dr. Evan Marshall	Episode: "The Mutant"
1964	Mr. Broadway	Television series	John Chambers	
1964–1967	The Virginian	Television series	Carl Rand / Wally Koerner	2 episodes
1965	Kraft Suspense Theatre	Television series	Phil Scanlon	
1965–1969	The Beverly Hillbillies	Television series	Dash Riprock	10 episodes
1965	Branded	Television series	Tuck Fraser	
1966	Blue Light	Television series	Nick Brady	
1967	The Big Valley	Television series	Jack Kilbain	
1967	Rango	Television series	Larkin	Episode: "Requiem for a Ranger"
1967	Three for Danger	TV pilot shown as a TV movie	Chris	
1967	Custer	Television series	Chief Yellow Hawk	
1967	Cimarron Strip	Television series	Rapp	
1968	Dragnet 1967	Television series	John Anzo / A Police Commissioner	
1968–1974	Gunsmoke	Television series	Ben Akins / John Woolfe	2 episodes
1969	My Friend Tony	Television series		
1969	Mayberry R.F.D.	Television series	Chuck	
1969	Land of the Giants	Television series	Guard	
1969	Bracken's World	Television series	Chuck	
1969-2+71	Mannix	Television series	Agent Barnes / Troy McBride	2 episodes
1970	Mission: Impossible	Television series	Karl Burroughs	
1970	Family Affair	Television series	Ken Granger	
1971	City Beneath the Sea	TV pilot shown as a TV movie	Bill Holmes	
1971	Longstreet	Television series	Ward Blakeman	
1971–1972	O'Hara, U.S. Treasury	Television series	Charles Donaldson / S.A. Peter Wade	2 episodes
1971–1974	McMillan & Wife	Television series	Vic Whelan / Agent Cushing	Episodes: "Death Is a Seven Point Favorite" / "Buried Alive"
1972–1973	Lassie	Television series	Keith Holden	21 episodes
1973	The Young and the Restless	Television series	Judge Chet Ashford	
1973	Banacek	Television series	Pete Biesecker	
1973–1974	The Streets of San Francisco	Television series	Becker / A High School coach	2 episodes
1974	Apple's Way	Television series	Sam Ferguson	
1974	Owen Marshall: Counselor at Law	Television series	Sargeant Bill Carrington	
1974	The Rookies	Television series	Henry Glass	
1974	Walt Disney's Wonderful World of Color	Television series	Dave Fletcher	
1974	Run, Joe, Run	Television series	Sheriff Frost	Episode: "Blind Girl"
1977	Hunter	Television series	Michael Orlin	
1977	Little House on the Prairie	Television series	Ben Griffin	
1979	Salvage 1	Television series	Street	
1979	BJ and the Bear	Television series	Mary Ellen	
1982–1986	Magnum, P.I.	Television series	Jack Martin / Norm Vogel	2 episodes
1993	Quantum Leap	Television series	Clark Gable	Episode: "Good-Bye, Norma Jean"
1997	Diagnosis: Murder	Television series	Dr. Arthur	Episode: "Looks Can Kill"
1997	Silk Stalkings	Television series	Dr. Kurland	Episode: "The Wedge"
2002	Firefly	Television series	Murphy	Episode: "Shindig"

=== Selected theater credits ===
- Dream a Little Dream – Lead – Company of Angels, Los Angeles
- Sing the Song Lady – Lead – Network Studio, North Hollywood
- Monroe – Lead – Crystal Sands, Hilton Head, South Carolina
- The Signing (written by Larry Pennell) – Lead – Stella Adler Theater, Beverly Hills Playhouse

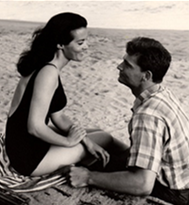
Larry Pennell and his wife Patricia.

- Close-Up (written by Larry Pennell) – Lead – Stella Adler Theater, Beverly Hills Playhouse
- Pieces of time – Lead – Pan Andreas Theater, Hollywood
- Desperate Hours – Lead – New Dramatist's, Inc., New York City
- Dead Autumn's Soul – Lead – New York City
- The Poker Game – Lead – (Pre-Broadway) New York City
- Mary, Mary – Lead – Tiffany's Attic Theater, Kansas City

== Personal life and death ==
Pennell met his wife Patricia Throop, a fashion model, actress, former Miss Oregon and finalist in the 1954 Miss America Pageant. He was shooting a film when they met. Throughout his life he enjoyed sports of all kinds such as baseball, football, tennis, boxing, running and horseback riding. Also he was an avid historian and a patriot with ancestral links in the American Revolution and the Mayflower Compact. Pennell died in Santa Monica, California on August 28, 2013, at age 85.
