= George Schenck =

American television writer and producer (1942–2024)

- Born: February 12, 1942
- Died: August 3, 2024 (aged 82); Los Angeles, California, U.S.
- Education: University of Southern California
- Occupations: Screenwriter, television producer
- Years active: 1960s–2018
- Spouse: Virginia (died 2023)
- Children: 2
- Father: Aubrey Schenck
- Relatives: Joseph M. Schenck (great-uncle); Nicholas Schenck (great-uncle)

George William Schenck (February 12, 1942 – August 3, 2024) was an American television writer and producer. His credits included Futureworld, the TV-movie The Phantom of Hollywood and numerous episodes of NCIS, where he was its showrunner from 2016 to 2018.

== Early life ==
Schenck was born in 1942, the son of film producer Aubrey Schenck. His great-uncles Joseph M. Schenck and Nicholas Schenck were studio executives. They headed 20th-Century Fox and MGM, respectively. Schenck served in the United States Navy and attended the University of Southern California.

== Career ==
Schenck began working as a television writer in the 1960s, amassing credits on several shows, including Bonanza. He worked on the comedy film Don't Worry, We'll Think of a Title (1966) and the Western film More Dead Than Alive (1969), produced by his father. A longtime collaborator with Frank Cardea, he also had a production company Schenck/Cardea Productions, which at one time, in the 1980s, was affiliated with Columbia Pictures Television.

Schenck joined the writing staff of NCIS at the show's debut in 2003, and went on to write dozens of episodes. He was an executive producer, and in 2016, Schenck and Cardea became the program's showrunners after the death of Gary Glasberg. Schenck retired in 2018.

== Personal life ==
Schenck and his wife, Virginia, were married for over a half-century until her death in 2023. They had two children, Jeffery and Kirk Schenck. Jeffery is an independent film producer having produced over 200 films.

Schenck died at his home in Brentwood, Los Angeles, on August 3, 2024, at the age of 82.
