= Aubrey Schenck =

American film producer (1908–1999)

Schenck in 1970

Aubrey Schenck (August 26, 1908, New York City – April 14, 1999, Murrieta, California) was an American film producer from the 1940s through the 1970s.

== Biography ==
The son of George Schenck, a Russian immigrant theatrical manager, and Mary Schenck, Schenck was a nephew of Joseph and Nicholas Schenck. Father to George Schenck and grandfather to Kirk Schenck. He graduated from Boys High School and Cornell University, and was a practicing attorney in New York City.

Among Schenck's clients was 20th Century Fox that led him to be a personal assistant to Spyros Skouras. When Schenck submitted a script for a film, Schenck told Skouras he would prefer to produce the film himself rather than be paid a fee. The film, Shock! (1946) starring Vincent Price, was a moderate success and launched Schenck's career as a movie producer.

Later he worked with Eagle-Lion Films and independent productions. When Eagle-Lion was merged into United Artists, Schenck started his own production company Bel-Air Productions producing a variety of action films as second features for UA. Other films made by Schenck include Robinson Crusoe on Mars (1964), Ambush Bay (1966) and Kill a Dragon (1967).

Schenck was the father of screenwriter and television producer George Schenck.

== Partial filmography ==
- Shock (1946)
- Repeat Performance (1947)
- It's a Joke, Son! (1947)
- T-Men (1947)
- Mickey (1948)
- Red Stallion in the Rockies (1949)
- Port of New York (1949)
- Undercover Girl (1950)
- The Fat Man (1951)
- Shield for Murder (1954)
- Rebel in Town (1956) (executive producer)
- The Black Sleep (1956) (executive producer)
- The Girl in Black Stockings (1957)
- Untamed Youth (1957)
- Born Reckless (1958)
- Up Periscope (1959)
- Robinson Crusoe on Mars (1964)
- Ambush Bay (1966) (executive producer)
- Kill a Dragon (1967)
- More Dead Than Alive (1968)
- Impasse (1969)
- Daughters of Satan (1972)
- Superbeast (1972)
- The Alpha Caper (1973)
