= Linda Bent =

American actress and model

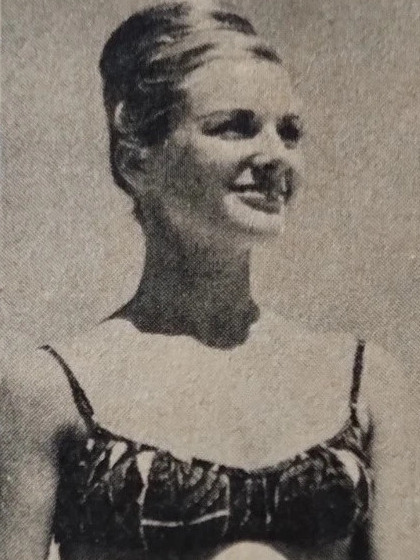
- Bent in the 1960s
- Born: Linda Jean Opie; March 30, 1939 (Note: Some sources give 1944 as her year of birth and her being 80 years old at the time of her death, yet still give March 30, 1939 as a date of birth.)
- Died: July 26, 2024 (aged 85)
- Occupations: Actress; model
- Years active: 1964–1966 (film)
- Spouse: Phillip Gordon Bent (m. 1964; died 1966)

Linda Jean Bent (née Opie; March 30, 1939 – July 24, 2024) was an American actress and model, best known for her appearances in beach party films in the mid-1960s.

== Early life ==
Born Linda Jean Opie, she was crowned Miss La Jolla only one year apart from her future beach party film co-star Salli Sachse.

== Career ==
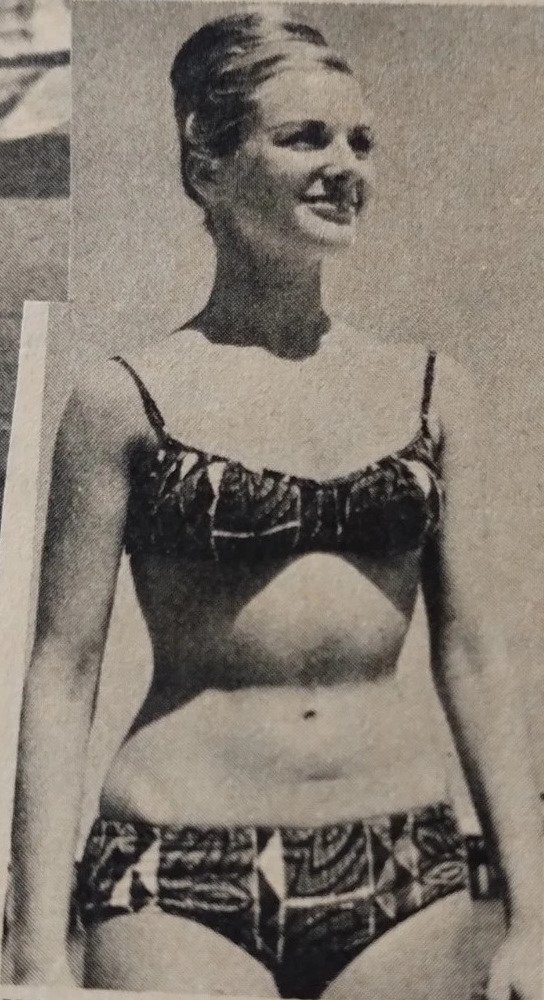
Bent in a promotional picture in the 1960s

Her first appearance was as a surfer girl in the film Muscle Beach Party (1964). She also appeared in Bikini Beach and Pajama Party, both also from 1964.

She made appearances in various beach party films, including Beach Blanket Bingo (1965) and How to Stuff a Wild Bikini (1965). She often appeared in the beach party films as part of a group of beach girls that usually surrounded the films' recurring leading couple of Frankie Avalon and Annette Funicello. Bent in particular was often paired with Salli Sachse, with both wearing similar topknot hairdos, and they were known as "Bookend Girls", as they were often positioned on the opposite ends of a crowd of surfers in the films. She also appeared in the non-beach party film Fireball 500 (1966), which nonetheless featured many beach party film regulars, including Sachse.

== Later life ==
Bent retired from acting following the death of her husband, but in August 2006 she was reunited with beach party film regulars like Sachse, Mary Hughes, and Patti Chandler for an interview for an article celebrating surf culture in the 1950s and 1960s for Vanity Fair.

== Personal life ==
In 1964, she married Phillip Gordon Bent, taking up his last name as her professional name. On July 12, 1966, Phillip died alongside Peter Sachse, the husband of Linda's beach party film co-star Salli Sachse, when the civilian-converted AT-6 owned and piloted by Phillip crashed near the Windansea Beach area of La Jolla when it pulled too low. The accident took place in front of Linda Bent and other beachgoers. Some sources referred to Phillip as Linda's "estranged husband" at the hime of his death.

Bent later remarried to a man described on her 2006 Vanity Fair interview as turning out to be "violently abusive", a marriage which produced a son. The marriage was described as having ended as of 2006.

== Filmography ==
- Muscle Beach Party (1964) as Surfer Girl (credited as Linda Opie)
- Bikini Beach (1964) as Beach Girl
- Pajama Party (1964) as Pajama Girl (credited as Linda Opie)
- Beach Blanket Bingo (1965) as Beach Girl
- How to Stuff a Wild Bikini (1965) as Bookend #1
- Fireball 500 (1966) as Leander Fan

== Bibliography ==
- Lisanti, Tom (2015a) [2003]. Drive-in Dream Girls: A Galaxy of B-Movie Starlets of the Sixties. McFarland. ISBN 978-0-7864-9342-5.
- Lisanti, Tom (2015b) [2001]. Fantasy Femmes of Sixties Cinema: Interviews with 20 Actresses from Biker, Beach, and Elvis Movies. McFarland. ISBN 978-1-4766-0116-8.
