= The Ghost in the Invisible Bikini =

1966 film by Don Weis

Ghost in the Invisible Bikini
- Theatrical release poster by Reynold Brown
- Directed by: Don Weis
- Written by: Louis M. Heyward; Elwood Ullman
- Produced by: Samuel Z. Arkoff; James H. Nicholson
- Starring: Tommy Kirk; Deborah Walley; Aron Kincaid; Harvey Lembeck; Jesse White; Claudia Martin; Nancy Sinatra; Basil Rathbone; Patsy Kelly; Boris Karloff; Susan Hart; Piccola Pupa
- Cinematography: Stanley Cortez
- Edited by: Eve Newman
- Music by: Les Baxter
- Production company: American International Pictures
- Distributed by: AIP
- Release date: April 6, 1966 (Boston)
- Running time: 82 minutes
- Country: United States
- Language: English
- Budget: $600,000
- Box office: $1.5 million (est. US/ Canada rentals)

Ghost in the Invisible Bikini is a 1966 American fantasy comedy film directed by Don Weis. It is the seventh and last of American International Pictures' beach party films. The film features the cast in and around a haunted house and the adjacent swimming pool.

The continuity linking this to the other beach films is the Rat Pack motorcycle gang led by Eric Von Zipper (Harvey Lembeck), as well as the appearance of previous beach party alumni Tommy Kirk, Deborah Walley, Bobbi Shaw, Jesse White, Aron Kincaid, Quinn O'Hara and Boris Karloff.

Pop singer Nancy Sinatra, who was on the rise at the time just before the film was released, has a supporting role and performs one song written for the film; and The Bobby Fuller Four appear as themselves and sing two songs. Claudia Martin, daughter of Dean Martin, co-stars in the film as Lulu. The Italian starlet Piccola Pupa appears as herself and sings a song.

== Plot ==
The ghost of recently dead Mr. Hiram Stokeley finds that he has 24 hours to perform one good deed to get into Heaven. He enlists the help of his long-dead girlfriend, Cecily, to stop his lawyer, Reginald Ripper, and a henchman from claiming the estate for themselves. The real heirs, Chuck, Lili, Hiram's cousin Myrtle, and her son bring their beach party friends to the mansion for a pool party while Reginald Ripper also employs his daughter Sinistra, and J. Sinister Hulk's slow-witted associates Chicken Feather and Yolanda to help them terrorize the teens, while dopey biker Eric Von Zipper and his Malibu Rat Pack bikers also get involved in pursuing Yolanda for a share of the Stokely estate.

== Cast ==
- Tommy Kirk as Chuck Phillips
- Deborah Walley as Lili Morton
- Aron Kincaid as Bobby
- Quinn O'Hara as Sinistra Ripper
- Jesse White as J. Sinister Hulk
- Nancy Sinatra as Vicki
- Claudia Martin as Lulu
- Francis X. Bushman as Malcolm
- Benny Rubin as Chicken Feather
- Bobbi Shaw as Princess Yolanda
- George Barrows as Monstro
- Basil Rathbone as Reginald Ripper
- Patsy Kelly as Myrtle Forbush
- Boris Karloff as Hiram Stokely
- Susan Hart as Cecily the Ghost
- Piccola Pupa as Piccola
- Luree Holmes as Luree
- Ed Garner as Ed
- Frank Alesia as Frank
- Mary Hughes as Mary
- Salli Sachse as Salli
- Patti Chandler as Patti
- Sue Hamilton as Sue

=== The Rat Pack ===
- Harvey Lembeck as Eric Von Zipper
- Andy Romano as J.D.
- Alberta Nelson as Puss
- Myrna Ross as Boots
- Jerry Brutsche as Jerome
- Bob Harvey as Bobby
- Sam Page as Chauncey
- John Macchia as Joey
- Allen Fife as Beard

== Production ==
=== Development ===
The project originated as Pajama Party in a Haunted House being first announced by AIP in January 1965. It was part of a line up of Beach Party-linked projects from the studio, the others including Beach Blanket Bingo, How to Stuff a Wild Bikini, Ski Party, Sergeant Deadhead, The Chase Jet Set Party, and a Beach Party TV series. (The last two of those announced were never made.)

It was also known in development as The Girl in the Glass Bikini and was originally to star Annette Funicello and Frankie Avalon, and be directed by William Asher. The title of Girl in the Glass Bikini can be seen in the promo in the end credits for Dr. Goldfoot and the Bikini Machine, an AIP spy spoof loosely affiliated with the Beach Party series (with "beach" alumni Avalon, Walley, Dwayne Hickman, and Susan Hart).

By June 1965, Don Weis was announced as director. He had made Pajama Party for AIP, and did it under a two-picture deal with the studio. Louis M. Heyward, who had also worked on Pajama Party, wrote the script.

During filming in October, the movie was also called Bikini Party in a Haunted House, Slumber Party in a Haunted House and Slumber Party in Harror House.

In December 1965 Sam Arkoff said "the bikini beach style has had it. We've had some real bombs lately."

=== Casting ===
Although Avalon and Funicello had been announced as the stars originally, neither appeared in the final film (it remains the only movie in the series to not feature either.) Walley - who made several films for AIP - signed in June 1965, and was soon followed by Nancy Sinatra and Claudia Martin. Beach Party regulars Jody McCrea, Harvey Lembeck and John Ashley were also originally announced in the cast with Buster Keaton signing to reprise his role as a comic Indian.

Keaton bowed out, due to illness (decd. February 1966) and his role was taken by Ben Rubin. Ashley and McCrea did not appear in the final film, the male leads being played by Tommy Kirk and Aron Kincaid, both of whom had worked for AIP before.

Other veteran actors who appeared were Francis X. Bushman, Basil Rathbone and Patsy Kelly. The movie was reportedly Bushman's 435th. Elsa Lanchester was originally announced to be playing a small role but did not appear in the final film.

Actress and singer Piccola Pupa was a 13-year-old discovery of Danny Thomas. The movie marked her film debut.

=== Filming ===
The shoot began in September 1965.

Aron Kincaid, who was forced to participate in the film under his long-term contract with AIP, was supposed to perform two musical numbers, but these scenes were dropped. After filming was completed, a number of the cast went to the Golden Oak Ranch to film the opening number, Bikini Party in a Haunted House, sung by Kincaid and Piccola Pupa.

Kincaid later recalled "the first day I was there [on set], a crew member fell off a catwalk, broke his neck and died. It left a blood stain all over this Oriental carpet but (the producers) felt nobody would see it and they left it. Then, it was if a curse settled over that picture. By the time it was released, six of the cast members were dead." (This was a slight exaggeration but several cast members did die soon after filming including Bobby Fuller, Phil Bent, Francis Bushman, and Basil Rathbone.)

The stunt scene of Eric Von Zipper crashing his motorcycle into a pond was used again in the first Billy Jack film, The Born Losers (1967), also produced by AIP.

=== Addition of Karloff/Hart sequences ===
James H. Nicholson and Samuel Z. Arkoff of AIP were not happy with the original cut of the film and subsequently ordered reshoots several weeks after the completion of principal photography, including addition of a new plot involving an old man who has to perform a good deed in order to gain eternal youth, and a sexy ghost in an invisible bikini who helps him. The old man was played by Boris Karloff and the ghost by Nicholson's wife Susan Hart. The movie was retitled Ghost in the Invisible Bikini.

Hart shot her scenes wearing a blonde wig and black velvet bathing suit, shot against a black velvet backdrop. They were directed by editor Ronnie Sinclair. Hart worked for two weeks on her own, then for a week with Boris Karloff. Karloff's scenes were all filmed in a one-room mausoleum set on a separate soundstage. For his scenes, Karloff is clearly standing in a bottomless coffin, rather than sitting up in it, a necessity given his chronic back problems and leg brace. Neither Hart or Karloff worked with any members of the original cast; their scenes were edited into the existing footage.

=== Music ===
Les Baxter composed and conducted the musical score. Al Simms was the musical supervisor, and Albert Harris composed some additional music and served as the film's orchestrator.

Guy Hemric and Jerry Styner wrote five songs that appear in the film:

- "Geronimo" performed by Nancy Sinatra
- "Don't Try to Fight It Baby" performed by Quinn O'Hara
- "Stand Up and Fight" performed by Piccola Pupa
- "Swing A-Ma Thing" performed by The Bobby Fuller Four
- "Make the Music Pretty" performed by The Bobby Fuller Four

== Reception ==
The film was released in April 1966.

=== Critical ===
Margaret Harford of the Los Angeles Times said the film "has little to distinguish itself from its predecessors beyond the rumour that this beach party romp in a haunted house will be the last in AIP's long proliferating series", further noting, "Old timers give the picture some class." Variety wrote, "All in all, a good try but short on script and inspiration."

Filmink wrote "I can’t call Ghost in the Invisible Bikini a good movie by any stretch of the imagination, but it’s endearing in its goofiness – Nancy Sinatra sings “Geronimo”, it’s always fun to see Boris Karloff and Basil Rathbone (who plays the main villain), Quinn O’Hara is terrific as a short-sighted vixen constantly seducing statues thinking that they’re men."

=== Box office ===
The film's theatrical releases was a commercial disappointment. Vincent Canby in the New York Times described it as "a flop". However, it did gross $1.5 million against a budget of $600,000. AIP made no further Beach Party films, as the genre was changing and grew into drag racing and motorcycle-themed storylines.

Philip Bent, who had a small role, died in a plane crash in July 1966 shortly after the film's release. In the same month, Bobby Fuller was also found dead near his home in LA.

== DVD ==
Under its 'Midnite Movie' line, Ghost in the Invisible Bikini was released on Region 1 DVD February 15, 2005 by MGM Home Entertainment. Ghost of Dragstrip Hollow was on Side Two of the disc, emulating AIP's theatrical release double features of the 1960s.

== See also ==
- List of American films of 1966
