= Eve Newman =

American film and music editor

- Born: Evelyn Lucille Lightfoot; July 24, 1915; California, U.S.
- Died: October 10, 2003 (aged 88); Burbank, California, U.S.
- Occupation: Film editor

Evelyn Lucille Newman (née Lightfoot, July 24, 1915 – October 10, 2003) was an American film and music editor. She was twice nominated for the Academy Award for Best Film Editing in 1968 for Wild in the Streets, and in 1976 for Two-Minute Warning.

== Selected filmography ==
Eve Newman began his career as an editor.

Based on Newman's filmography at the Internet Movie Database.

Editor
| Year | Film | Director | Notes |
|---|---|---|---|
| 1964 | Muscle Beach Party | William Asher | Second collaboration with William Asher |
| 1964 | Bikini Beach | William Asher | Third collaboration with William Asher |
| 1964 | Pajama Party | Don Weis | First collaboration with Don Weis |
| 1965 | Beach Blanket Bingo | William Asher | Fourth collaboration with William Asher |
| 1965 | How to Stuff a Wild Bikini | William Asher | Fifth collaboration with William Asher |
| 1965 | Sergeant Deadhead | Norman Taurog | First collaboration with Norman Taurog |
| 1965 | Dr. Goldfoot and the Bikini Machine | Norman Taurog | Second collaboration with Norman Taurog |
| 1966 | The Ghost in the Invisible Bikini | Don Weis | Second collaboration with Don Weis |
| 1966 | Fireball 500 | William Asher | Sixth collaboration with William Asher |
| 1967 | C'mon, Let's Live a Little | David Butler | |
| 1968 | Wild in the Streets | Barry Shear | |
| 1968 | Three in the Attic | Richard Wilson | |
| 1969 | Angel, Angel, Down We Go | Robert Thom | |
| 1970 | Bloody Mama | Roger Corman | Sixth collaboration with Roger Corman |
| 1973 | Little Cigars | Chris Christenberry | |
| 1975 | The Other Side of the Mountain | Larry Peerce | First collaboration with Larry Peerce |
| 1976 | Two-Minute Warning | Larry Peerce | Second collaboration with Larry Peerce |
| 1978 | The Other Side of the Mountain Part 2 | Larry Peerce | Third collaboration with Larry Peerce |
| 1978 | Paradise Alley | Sylvester Stallone | |
| 1980 | Little Miss Marker | Walter Bernstein | |
| 1984 | No Small Affair | Jerry Schatzberg | |

Editorial department
| Year | Film | Director | Role |
|---|---|---|---|
| 1972 | Deadhead Miles | Vernon Zimmerman | Supervising editor; Supervising film editor |
| 1981 | Silence of the North | Allan King | Editorial consultant |

Music department
| Year | Film | Director | Role | Notes |
|---|---|---|---|---|
| 1952 | Wagons West | Ford Beebe | Music editor | |
| 1952 | The Rose Bowl Story | William Beaudine | Music editor | |
| 1952 | Flat Top | Lesley Selander | Music editor | First collaboration with Lesley Selander |
| 1953 | The Maze | William Cameron Menzies | Music editor | |
| 1953 | Fighter Attack | Lesley Selander | Music editor | Second collaboration with Lesley Selander |
| 1953 | Dragonfly Squadron | Lesley Selander | Music editor | Third collaboration with Lesley Selander |
| 1955 | Wichita | Jacques Tourneur | Music editor | First collaboration with Jacques Tourneur |
| 1957 | Snowfire | Dorrell McGowan; Stuart E. McGowan | Music editor | |
| 1957 | Spook Chasers | George Blair | Music editor | First collaboration with George Blair |
| 1957 | Dino | Thomas Carr | Music editor | First collaboration with Thomas Carr |
| 1957 | The Tall Stranger | Thomas Carr | Music editor | Second collaboration with Thomas Carr |
| 1958 | Hell's Five Hours | Jack L. Copeland | Music editor | |
| 1958 | Fort Massacre | Joseph M. Newman | Music editor | First collaboration with Joseph M. Newman |
| 1958 | I Bury the Living | Albert Band | Music editor | |
| 1958 | Man of the West | Anthony Mann | Music editor | |
| 1959 | Some Like It Hot | Billy Wilder | Music editor | |
| 1959 | The Gunfight at Dodge City | Joseph M. Newman | Music editor | Second collaboration with Joseph M. Newman |
| 1960 | The Hypnotic Eye | George Blair | Music editor | Second collaboration with George Blair |
| 1960 | House of Usher | Roger Corman | Music editor | First collaboration with Roger Corman |
| 1960 | Alakazam the Great | Taiji Yabushita; Daisaku Shirakawa | Music editor | |
| 1961 | Master of the World | William Witney | Music editor | |
| 1961 | The Pit and the Pendulum | Roger Corman | Music editor | Second collaboration with Roger Corman |
| 1961 | The George Raft Story | Joseph M. Newman | Music editor | Third collaboration with Joseph M. Newman |
| 1962 | Convicts 4 | Millard Kaufman | Music editor | |
| 1962 | Panic in Year Zero! | Ray Milland | Music editor | |
| 1962 | Tales of Terror | Roger Corman | Music editor | Third collaboration with Roger Corman |
| 1963 | The Raven | Roger Corman | Music editor | Fourth collaboration with Roger Corman |
| 1963 | The Girl Who Knew Too Much | Mario Bava | Music editor: International version | First collaboration with Mario Bava |
| 1963 | Operation Bikini | Anthony Carras | Music editor | |
| 1963 | X: The Man with the X-ray Eyes | Roger Corman | Music editor | Fifth collaboration with Roger Corman |
| 1963 | Beach Party | William Asher | Music editor | First collaboration with William Asher |
| 1963 | Black Sabbath | Mario Bava | Music editor: US version | Second collaboration with Mario Bava |
| 1963 | The Comedy of Terrors | Jacques Tourneur | Music editor | Second collaboration with Jacques Tourneur |

Documentaries

Editor
| Year | Film | Director |
|---|---|---|
| 1965 | The Big T.N.T. Show | Larry Peerce |

TV movies

Editor
| Year | Film | Director |
|---|---|---|
| 1974 | The Stranger Who Looks Like Me | Larry Peerce |
| 1987 | Into the Homeland | Lesli Linka Glatter |

TV series

Composer
| Year | Title | Notes |
|---|---|---|
| 1956 | Sky King | 8 episodes |
| 1955−56 | Death Valley Days | 5 episodes |
| 1957 | The Silent Service | 1 episode |

Music department
| Year | Title | Role | Notes |
|---|---|---|---|
| 1956 | Sky King | Music editor | 8 episodes |
| 1955−57 | Death Valley Days | Music editor | 35 episodes |
| 1958 | The Millionaire | Music supervisor | 1 episode |
