= Pajama Party (film) =

1964 beach party film directed by Don Weis

- theatrical poster
- Directed by: Don Weis
- Written by: Louis M. Heyward
- Produced by: Samuel Z. Arkoff; James H. Nicholson
- Starring: Tommy Kirk; Annette Funicello; Elsa Lanchester; Harvey Lembeck; Jesse White; Jody McCrea; Ben Lessy; Donna Loren; Susan Hart; Bobbi Shaw; Candy Johnson; Buster Keaton; Dorothy Lamour
- Cinematography: Floyd Crosby
- Edited by: Eve Newman
- Music by: Score: Les Baxter; Songs: Jerry Styner; Guy Hemric
- Distributed by: American International Pictures
- Release date: November 11, 1964
- Running time: 82 minutes
- Country: United States
- Language: English
- Budget: $200,000

Pajama Party is a 1964 American beach party film directed by Don Weis and starring Tommy Kirk and Annette Funicello. It was written by Louis M. Heyward.

This is the fourth in a series of seven beach films produced by American International Pictures. The other films in this series are Beach Party (1963), Muscle Beach Party (1964), Bikini Beach (1964), Beach Blanket Bingo (1965), How to Stuff a Wild Bikini (1965), Ski Party a one-off film with a brief beach scene at the end (1965) and The Ghost in the Invisible Bikini (1966).

This fourth entry has not always been considered a follow-up to the three films that preceded it. Several sources have noted,however, that while it is not a proper sequel, it is indeed a part of what is now termed AIP's ‘Beach Party series.’ Moreover, AIP marketed it as a sequel in its trailer, stating "The Bikini Beach Party Gang is Warming Up! – For the 'Party' that Takes Off – Where others Poop Out!" and "All the 'Beach Party' Fun ... in Pajamas!"

Additional links that tie this film to the others are the return of Eric von Zipper and his Rat Pack (who previously appeared in Beach Party and Bikini Beach) and the return of Candy Johnson as Candy for the fourth time in as many films.

Regulars Frankie Avalon, Don Rickles, Annette Funicello, Jody McCrea and Donna Loren all appear (albeit with character name changes – not the first time this happens in the series, nor the last); Susan Hart makes the first of three appearances in the AIP brand of the genre; Buster Keaton makes the first of four appearances, and Bobbi Shaw makes the first appearance of five (including Ski Party). In addition, several background players in this film (Patti Chandler, Mary Hughes, Johnny Fain, Mike Nader, Salli Sachse, Luree Holmes, Ronnie Dayton, Ed Garner, Ray Atkinson, Linda Benson, and Laura Nicholson) also appear in three or more films in the AIP brand of the genre.

The film is not to be confused with the 1963 novel Pajama Party about lesbian activities among college girls, which was banned on the grounds of obscenity.

== Plot ==
A teen-aged intelligence officer from the planet Mars named Go Go is ordered to Earth to prepare the way for a Martian invasion. As he attempts to land on Earth, the power-pack he wears on his back malfunctions and he is suspended several feet above ground. However, he is saved by the first Earthling he meets, Aunt Wendy, an eccentric widow with problems of her own. Her shady neighbor, J. Sinister Hulk and his associates, Chief Rotten Eagle and a bikinied Swedish bombshell named Helga, are scheming to separate Aunt Wendy from her million-dollar inheritance.

A subplot involves a motorcycle gang led by Eric von Zipper, a leather-jacketed, middle-aged delinquent with an irrational hatred for buxom beach-babes and their surfer-dude boyfriends. One such character, Connie, has a crush on a volleyball nut named Big Lunk. Inexplicably, he responds with no interest. So Connie transmits a few subtle signals toward Go Go, and he gets the message. But later, when she discovers that Go Go is a hostile Martian scout, she pouts and calls the whole thing off.

Helga has been assigned to seduce Big Lunk in order to get the location of his Aunt's money from him, but she genuinely falls in love with him. Helga doesn't speak English, so communicating her love is difficult.

In the meantime, Go Go is emotionally depressed by the absence of Connie. At a climactic pajama party, he thus turns informer and prevents Earth from being overrun. He is reunited with Connie, and the world is made safe. Go Go has teleported Sinister Hulk, Fleegle, and Chief Rotten Eagle to Mars; to the consternation of Big Bang. New policy is quickly adopted – Earth leaves Mars alone, and Mars leaves Earth alone.

== Cast ==
- Tommy Kirk as Go Go the Martian
- Annette Funicello as Connie
- Elsa Lanchester as Aunt Wendy
- Harvey Lembeck as Eric Von Zipper
- Jesse White as J. Sinister Hulk
- Jody McCrea as Big Lunk
- Ben Lessy as Fleegle
- Donna Loren as Vikki
- Susan Hart as Jilda
- Bobbi Shaw as Helga
- Cheryl Sweeten as Francine
- Luree Holmes as perfume girl
- Dorothy Kilgallen as herself
- Candy Johnson as Candy
- Buster Keaton as Chief Rotten Eagle
- Dorothy Lamour as head saleslady
- Don Rickles as "Big Bang" The Martian
- Frankie Avalon as Socum The Martian
- Mary Hughes as Pajama Girl
- Patti Chandler as Pajama Girl
- Teri Garr (credited as Teri Hope) as Pajama Girl
- Toni Basil as Pajama Girl
- Alberta Nelson as Alberta, rat pack girl

== Production notes ==
Animator Joseph Barbera wrote a romantic comedy play which debuted on stage in Los Angeles in 1952 called The Maid and the Martian. It was about Captain Derro, a scout from Mars, who goes to Earth to help plan an invasion, but falls in love with a girl from Earth. The Los Angeles Times said the play "has strong elements and might even go to Broadway... provided it gains more completeness in plot and situation." The production was directed by Gordon Hunt and starred Pat Priest (who would later become a regular on TV's The Munsters). It ran successfully for seven weeks. The play was revived in 1954 with James Arness in the lead.

In 1961 AIP announced they would make The Maid and the Martian from a script by Al Burton and Gordon Hunt, based on the play. Stanley Frazen was to produce. However, none of those people are credited on Pajama Party despite the fact the plot shares strong similarities with the final film. Annette Funicello even recorded an upbeat song titled "The Maid and the Martian" for her Vista album "Pajama Party", leading many to conclude the film and the play are clearly one and the same.

=== Script ===
This was the first movie Louis M. Heyward worked on for AIP. He wrote the script in two weeks, saying he tried to do it as a cartoon "and if you look at it, it's done almost in cartoon cuts, in four-strips." Heyward says the film was firmly aimed at the 15- to 25-year-old demographic. "These youngsters have the numbers, the buying power and the discrimination to make or break any film product."

Heyward went on to write several other films for the studio, and became a leading executive for them.

=== Director ===
Pajama Party is one of only two Beach Party films not directed by William Asher. Pajama Party and The Ghost in the Invisible Bikini were both directed by Don Weis.

=== Cast ===
Frankie Avalon appears in the film in all the scenes with Don Rickles, but only the back of Avalon's head is seen until the final moments. (He was making I'll Take Sweden during the shoot. ) During the entire Beach Party series, this was the one and only time Donna Loren was seen in a speaking role.

Syndicated newspaper columnist Dorothy Kilgallen's son, Kerry Kollmar, has a recurring role throughout the film as a little boy who declares disgustedly "Mush!" whenever he spies romance in action. Kilgallen herself, whose newspaper column was not accessible in Los Angeles and who was better known there as a TV game show panelist, has a tiny cameo as a woman who falls on J.D.'s motorcycle during the car chase sequence. She introduces herself saying, "My name is Dorothy – what's yours?"

Cheryl Sweeten, who was the 1963 Miss Colorado and played Francine in this film, made only this one film, but she received prominent billing in the end credits.

This was the first movie Susan Hart made for AIP under her four-picture contract with the studio. She was one of a number of young players in the film who were under a long-term deal with AIP, the others including Donna Loren, Bobbi Shaw, Cheryl Sweeten, Mary Hughes, Michael Nader and Edward Garner.

It was also the first movie Buster Keaton made for AIP. Louis M Heyward claims casting Keaton was his idea as they had worked together previously on The Faye Emerson Show. and the first movie for Bobbi Shaw, playing her "ya, ya" Swedish bombshell and Keaton's partner.

It was the first film Tommy Kirk made for AIP.

Dorothy Lamour makes her last musical appearance in a film, singing "Where Did I Go Wrong?"

Don Weis, Heyward and Kirk collaborated on another AIP beach party film which was actually a pajama party movie, The Ghost in the Invisible Bikini.

=== Choreography ===
The dances for this film were choreographed by David Winters of Shindig! and Hullabaloo fame. Both Teri Garr and Toni Basil were Winters' students at the time.

=== Production ===
Filming started on 10 August 1964.

The studio backlot used for the car chase sequence is the Warner Bros. Ranch Facility in Burbank, which was also used for the car chase sequence in Bikini Beach. The beach used for the volleyball scenes and Donna Loren's "Among the Young" song is Paradise Cove in Malibu.

Susan Hart claimed second unit footage was later shot where her legs were substituted by another person's.

=== Product placement ===
The film features extensive product placement of Dr Pepper soft drink (Donna Loren was known at the time as the "Dr Pepper Girl"). The then new Ford Mustang is also featured in several scenes.

== Music ==
Guy Hemric and Jerry Styner wrote all the songs heard in the film, and several melodies were picked up and used for the film's score by composer Les Baxter. The music supervisor was Al Simms.

Annette Funicello performs:

- "Pajama Party" – title track
- "It's That Kind of Day", with the cast
- "Stuffed Animal"

Funicello and Tommy Kirk sing:

- "There Has to Be a Reason"

Dorothy Lamour sings:

- "Where Did I Go Wrong"

Donna Loren sings:

- "Among the Young"

The Los Angeles–based band The Nooney Rickett 4 (which appeared in Columbia's beach party film, Winter A-Go-Go the following year) play backup for "Among the Young", and are shown playing backup for "Pajama Party." The band also performs an instrumental version of "Among the Young" in the film – entitled "Beach Ball" – and are shown performing an instrumental of "It's That Kind of Day."

== Reception ==
John L. Scott of the Los Angeles Times said, "AIP's stock company puts on a frantic, funny show. Individual performances are standard for this type of picture, which means 'solid, man.'" Variety wrote, "As before there's strong accent on pulchritude and near-nudity via brief attire", adding that the script "makes no effort to keep the narrative either taut or logical." The Monthly Film Bulletin stated, "The pop songs are feeble, the black-leather-gang parody is too completely divorced from reality, the Sci-fi element doesn't get off the ground, and the numerous near-nude teenage parties are utterly synthetic in their exuberance. Don Weis has a smooth way with action, but can make nothing of the chaotic narrative, the lethally unfunny running gags, and the insipid love scenes." Filmink wrote "The most charming thing about Pajama Party is the fact that it’s a valentine to old Hollywood. "

The popularity of the film led to Buster Keaton appearing in a number of AIP movies before his death.

== See also ==
- List of American films of 1964

== Bibliography ==
- Weaver, Tom, Michael Brunas, John Brunas, and "Louis M. Heyward" (1991), Science Fiction Stars and Horror Heroes: Interviews with Actors, Directors, Producers and Writers of the 1940s Through 1960s. McFarland.
