= Thunder Alley (1967 film) =

1967 film by Richard Rush

- Theatrical poster
- Directed by: Richard Rush
- Written by: Sy Salkowitz
- Produced by: Samuel Z. Arkoff; James H. Nicholson; Burt Topper
- Starring: Annette Funicello; Fabian; Diane McBain; Warren Berlinger; Jan Murray
- Cinematography: Monroe P. Askins
- Edited by: Kenneth G. Crane; Ronald Sinclair
- Music by: Mike Curb; Davie Allan
- Distributed by: American International Pictures
- Release date: March 22, 1967
- Running time: 89 minutes
- Country: United States
- Budget: $1.4 million
- Box office: $1,250,000 (US/ Canada)

Thunder Alley is a 1967 film about auto racing directed by Richard Rush and starring Annette Funicello and Fabian Forte. It was released by American International Pictures.

== Plot ==
A race car driver, Tommy Callahan, retires after a blackout causes the death of another driver on the motorway. After the accident, he begins working at a Pete Madsen's "Thrill Circus" as a stunt driver. There he meets the proprietor's daughter, Francie, who also drives there, and her boyfriend Eddie Sands.

Bored by his new job, Tommy begins training Eddie to be a professional. Eddie picks it up quickly, winning his first race. This leads to Tommy's gold-digging ex-girlfriend Annie Blaine scheming to steal the hot young driver away from Francie.

Despite their quarreling, plus Francie's concern over his previous blackouts, she and Tommy are paired up during a 500-mile race. On the track, Tommy feels another blackout coming on, but manages to hang on. He comes to realize that the fainting spells are a psychological reaction to a childhood trauma.

Francie goads ex-fiance Eddie into reckless maneuvers on the track, causing him to crash. Tommy wins the race, and her as well.

== Cast ==
- Annette Funicello as Francie Madsen
- Fabian as Tommy Callahan
- Diane McBain as Annie Blaine
- Warren Berlinger as Eddie Sands
- Jan Murray as Pete Madsen
- Stanley Adams as Mac Lunsford
- Michael T. Mikler as Harry Wise
- Maureen Arthur as "Babe"
- Kip King as Dominic "Dom"
- Michael Bell as Leroy Johnson
- Sandy Reed as Racing Announcer Sandy
- Sammy Shore as "Turk"
- Baynes Barron as Reece
- Salli Sachse as Barmaid
- Luree Holmes as Barmaid
- Mary Hughes as Barmaid

== Production ==
The film was originally known as Malibu 500 and Rebel 500. It was the third of a seven-picture deal between AIP and Fabian.

The director was Richard Rush who had made a number of lower budgeted films. He got the job through his agent, who was married to Annette Funicello at the time. Rush said AIP "were fond of my work.... They were the teenage exploitation studio... Since I was very rebellious, my characters were always very rebellious, which seemed to be the keynote of American youth at that time. My pictures worked in the marketplace."

AIP was then run by the team of Sam Arkoff and James H. Nicholson. Rush said before filming, "Sam Arkoff took me aside and said, 'Look, [Jim] Nicholson has got this girlfriend, and I don't want her on the picture.' I said that was okay. A while later, Nicholson pulled me aside and said, 'Richard, there's this girl I'd like you to use on the picture...'." (It is likely this was Susan Hart.)

Filming began on 1 November 1966 and took place at the Producers Studio in Hollywood.

Rush later said "Fabian turned out to be much better than my expectations. I had that jaundiced view of, "Oh, it's Fabian — a manufactured talent." But he wasn't like that; he was a smart kid, worked hard, and was willing to do whatever you asked him to. Annette had poise and great ability, and was a mini-movie star."

Rush later said it was one of his few films "that I didn't have any freedom on." He said the main problem was when he was hired the producer Burt Topper had already spent three racing seasons shooting car racing footage.

"They came to me with that part already done. Since it's a racing film, it didn't have what I was hoping would be my trademark, even at that early stage. So I never felt it was completely my film. It was like writing the story around the footage."

Rush said, "The part of the film that deals with the actors is mine, and the rest is Burt's. It sort of divorced me from that sense of proprietorship that I have over all of my other films.

Diane McBain wrote in her memoir that "I didn't know at the time, but this film would mark the beginning of the end of my career in motion pictures." She said Rush "tried to make something of the cliche-ridden script" and "Walt Disney must have been shocked to see Annette, his former television Mouseketeer, play the part of a young woman who threw orgies and became a drunk driver. Disney died weeks later [after filming]. I wonder if he got wind of what Annette was doing!" She added, "Thankfully, I don't remember very much about filming this drive-in dud."

== Reception ==
Contemporary reviews were mediocre. However AIP liked Rush's work and he made two other films for that company, Psych-Out and The Savage Seven.

Quentin Tarantino is an admirer of the film. "Richard Rush is a terrific director and stunt man and I actually used part of the score from this film in the big car chase scene in my movie Death Proof. It's a real Sixties hard-driving piece of music with bongos and a syntar. That's really cool."

According to Diabolique magazine:

Thunder Alley is a far more cohesive and successful film than Fireball 500 – a solid drama with a thumping soundtrack... and Annette Funicello is really good – but then it's a strong role, perhaps her best ever for AIP. Fabian is also strong – cocky, arrogant, but haunted and basically decent; it's one of his best parts.

== Soundtrack ==
The film features the song "When You Get What You Want" by Guy Hemric and Jerry Styner, performed by Annette Funicello. The duo also wrote the title song "Thunder Alley", performed by The Band Without a Name. The song "Riot in Thunder Alley", by Eddie Beram, from the film also appears in the film and soundtrack album for Death Proof.

== See also ==
- List of American films of 1967
