= Wild in the Streets =

1968 film by Barry Shear

- Theatrical release poster by Reynold Brown
- Directed by: Barry Shear
- Written by: Robert Thom
- Based on: short story "The Day It All Happened, Baby!" by Robert Thom
- Produced by: Samuel Z. Arkoff; James H. Nicholson
- Starring: Shelley Winters; Christopher Jones; Diane Varsi; Hal Holbrook; Millie Perkins; Richard Pryor; Bert Freed; Kevin Coughlin; Larry Bishop; Ed Begley
- Narrated by: Paul Frees (uncredited)
- Cinematography: Richard Moore
- Edited by: Fred R. Feitshans Jr.; Eve Newman
- Music by: Les Baxter
- Distributed by: American International Pictures
- Release date: May 29, 1968
- Running time: 97 minutes
- Country: United States
- Language: English
- Budget: $700,000
- Box office: $4,000,000 (rentals)

Wild in the Streets is a 1968 American dystopian comedy-drama film directed by Barry Shear and starring Christopher Jones, Hal Holbrook and Shelley Winters. Based on the short story "The Day It All Happened, Baby!" by Robert Thom, it was distributed by American International Pictures. The film, described as both "ludicrous" and "cautionary", was nominated for an Academy Award for Best Film Editing and became a cult classic of the 1960s counterculture.

== Plot ==
Popular rock singer and aspiring revolutionary Max Frost was born Max Jacob Flatow Jr. His first public act of violence was blowing up his family's new car. Frost's musical band, the Troopers, live with him, their women and others in a sprawling Beverly Hills mansion. The band includes his 15-year-old genius attorney Billy Cage on lead guitar, ex-child actor and girlfriend Sally LeRoy on keyboards, hook-handed Abraham Salteen on bass guitar, and trumpeter and anthropologist Stanley X on drums. Max's band performs a song that notes that 52% of the population is 25 or younger, making young people the majority in the country.

When Max is asked to sing at a televised political rally by Senate candidate Johnny Fergus, who is running on a platform to lower the voting age from 21 to 18, he and the Troopers appear, but Max stuns everyone by instead calling for the voting age to become 14, and he finishes the show with an improvised song called "Fourteen or Fight!" and a call for a demonstration. Max's fans—and thousands of other young people—stir to action, and within 24 hours, protests have begun in cities around the United States. Fergus's advisors want him to denounce Max, but he instead agrees to support the demonstrations and change his campaign, but only if Max and his group compromise, accept a voting age of 15, abide by the law, and appeal to the demonstrators to go home peaceably. Max agrees, and the two appear together on television the following day, using the less offensive mantra "Fifteen and Ready".

Most states agree to lower the voting age within days, in the wake of the demonstrations, and Max Frost and the Troopers campaign for Johnny Fergus until the election, which he wins by a landslide. Taking his place in the Senate, Fergus wishes Frost and his people would now go away, but instead they get involved with Washington politics. When a Congressman from Sally LeRoy's home district suddenly dies, the band enters her in the special election that follows, and Sally—the eldest of the group, and the only one of majority age to run for office—is voted into Congress by the new teen bloc.

The first bill that Sally introduces is a constitutional amendment to lower the age requirements for national political office to 14, and "Fourteen or Fight!" enters a new phase. A joint session of Congress is called, and the Troopers—now joined by Fergus's son, Jimmy—swing the vote their way by spiking the Washington, D.C., water supply with LSD, and providing all the Senators and Representatives with teenage escorts.

As teens either take over or threaten the reins of government, the "Old Guard" (those over 40) turn to Max to run for president, and assert his (their) control of the changing tide. Max again agrees, begrudgingly running as a Republican, but once in office, he turns the tide on his older supporters. Thirty becomes a mandatory retirement age, while those over 35 are rounded up, sent to "re-education camps" and permanently dosed on LSD. Fergus unsuccessfully attempts to dissuade Max by contacting his estranged parents, and tries to assassinate him. Failing at this, he flees Washington, D.C., with his remaining family, but they are soon rounded up.

With youth now in control of the United States, politically as well as economically, similar revolutions break out in all the world's major countries. Max withdraws the military from around the world (turning them instead into de facto "age police"), puts computers and prodigies in charge of the gross national product, ships surplus grain for free to Third World nations, disbands the FBI and Secret Service, and becomes the leader of "the most truly hedonistic society the world has ever known".

Ultimately however, Max and his cohorts may face future intergenerational warfare from an unexpected source: pre-teen children. When a young girl learns of Max's age (which is now 24), she sneers, "That's old!" After Max kills a crawdad that was a pet to several young kids, after he mocks their youth and powerlessness, one of the kids resolves, "We're gonna put everybody over 10 out of business".

== Cast ==
- Shelley Winters as Mrs. Max Flatow / Frost
- Christopher Jones as Max Jacob Flatow Jr. / Max Frost
- Diane Varsi as Sally LeRoy
- Hal Holbrook as Senator Fergus
- Millie Perkins as Mrs. Fergus
- Richard Pryor as Stanley "Stanley X"
- Bert Freed as Max Jacob Flatow Sr.
- Kevin Coughlin as Billy Cage
- Larry Bishop as Abraham "The Hook" Salteen
- Michael Margotta as Jimmy Fergus
- Ed Begley as Senator Allbright
- May Ishihara as Elly "Fuji Elly"
- Salli Sachse as Hippie Mother
- Kellie Flanagan as Young Mary Fergus
- Don Wyndham as Joseph Fergus
- Gary Busey as Concert Attendee (uncredited)

== Production notes ==
The film was completed in 20 days.

Lowering the voting age was an issue in 1968 and was passed in 1970, with Oregon v. Mitchell lowering the presidential minimum voting age to 18 and 1971 with the 26th Amendment lowering local and state election minimum voting ages to 18.

The movie features cameos from several media personalities, including Melvin Belli, Dick Clark, Pamela Mason, Army Archerd, and Walter Winchell. Millie Perkins and Ed Begley have supporting roles, and Bobby Sherman interviews Max as president. In a pre-Brady Bunch role, Barry Williams plays the teenage Max Frost at the beginning of the movie. Child actress Kellie Flanagan, who plays Johnny Fergus's daughter Mary, appeared in director Barry Shear's television special All Things Bright and Beautiful in the same year. She discussed filming Wild in the Streets in a 2014 interview with Adam Gerace, telling him "I get a huge kick out of Wild in the Streets and always have."

According to filmmaker Kenneth Bowser, the part eventually played by Christopher Jones was offered to folk singer Phil Ochs. After reading the screenplay, Ochs rejected the offer, claiming the story distorted the actual nature of the youth counterculture of the period.

== Music ==
A soundtrack album was released on Tower Records and became successful, peaking at No. 12 on the Billboard charts. Taken from the soundtrack and film, "Shape of Things to Come" (written by songwriters Barry Mann and Cynthia Weil) and performed by the fictional band Max Frost and the Troopers, was released as a single (backed with "Free Lovin' ") and became a hit, reaching No. 22 on Billboard in 1968.

== Reception ==
Film critic of the time, Pauline Kael, calls it a movie that was created out of a slammed together mixture of opportunism, spit and hysteria. The review wasn't purely negative. She goes on to say that the movie is "blatantly crummy-looking" but that the aesthetic somehow works for it.

On the review aggregator website Rotten Tomatoes, Wild in the Streets holds an approval rating of 67%, based on 21 critic reviews with an average rating of 5.8 out of 10.

Roger Ebert of the Chicago Sun-Times unfavorably compared Wild in the Streets to Privilege (1967), another film that dealt with politics driving the worship of pop idols. Despite the two-star rating, he admitted that the former was the more effective of the two because it has a greater understanding of its teenage audience. He added, "It's a silly film, but it does communicate in the simplest, most direct terms."

Renata Adler of The New York Times raved about the movie, declaring it "by far the best American film of the year so far" and compared it to The Battle of Algiers (1967).

== Release ==
Wild in the Streets was released in theaters in 1968. Its plot was a reductio ad absurdum projection of contemporary issues of the time, taken to extremes, and played poignantly during 1968 – an election year with many controversies (the Vietnam War, the draft, civil rights, the population explosion, rioting and assassinations, and the baby boomer generation coming of age). The original magazine short story, titled "The Day It All Happened, Baby!" was expanded by its author to book length, and was published as a paperback novel by Pyramid Books.

In 1969, Fred R. Feitshans Jr. and Eve Newman were both nominated for the Oscar for Best Film Editing for their work on this film.

Wild in the Streets was released on VHS in the late 1980s, and in 2005 appeared on DVD, on a Midnite Movies disc with 1971's Gas-s-s-s.

== See also ==
- Prez (1973), a DC Comics series about the first teenage president of the United States
- Generation gap
- Hippie exploitation films
- Youth empowerment
- Youth voice
- List of American films of 1968
