= Andy Romano =

American actor (1936–2022)

- Born: Andrew Romasanta; April 16, 1936; New York City, U.S.
- Died: September 14, 2022 (aged 86); Sequim, Washington, U.S.
- Occupation: Actor
- Years active: 1962–2003
- Spouse: Katherin Huppert (m. 2006; div. 2008)

Andrew Romasanta, known professionally as Andy Romano (April 16, 1936 – September 14, 2022), was an American actor, known for playing "J.D.", an outlaw motorcyclist and right-hand henchman of the character Eric von Zipper (played by Harvey Lembeck) in the 1960s Beach party films (which starred Annette Funicello and Frankie Avalon).

After Beach Party movies lost money and stopped filming, Romano appeared in minor roles on television episodes and some TV movies through much of the 1970s and 1980. In the late 1980s, he returned to movies in supporting roles, though he continued to guest-star on TV series, including NYPD Blue. Romano retired from acting in the late 1990s and settled in Washington state.

Romano died on September 14, 2022, aged 86.

== Selected filmography ==
Year	Title	Role	Comments
1961	Alfred Hitchcock Presents	Gas Station Attendant	Season 6 Episode 30: "You Can't Trust a Man"
1961	Alfred Hitchcock Presents	Young Workman	Season 7 Episode 10: "Services Rendered"
1962	Alfred Hitchcock Presents	Barry the Patrolman	Season 7 Episode 15: "The Door Without a Key"
1962	Alfred Hitchcock Presents	Cop	Season 7 Episode 26: "Ten O'Clock Tiger"
1962	Alfred Hitchcock Presents	2nd Officer	Season 7 Episode 34: "The Twelve Hour Caper"
1962	The Alfred Hitchcock Hour	P.A.L. Officer	Season 1 Episode 9: "The Black Curtain"
1963	The Alfred Hitchcock Hour	2nd Fireman	Season 1 Episode 19: "To Catch a Butterfly"
1963	The Alfred Hitchcock Hour	Assistant	Season 1 Episode 27: "Death and the Joyful Woman"
1963	Beach Party	"J.D."	First film appearance
1964	Bikini Beach	"J.D."	Supporting role
1964	Pajama Party	"J.D."	Supporting role
1965	Beach Blanket Bingo	"J.D."	Supporting role
1965	How to Stuff a Wild Bikini	"J.D."	Supporting role
1966	The Ghost in the Invisible Bikini	"J.D."	Supporting role
1967	Batman (TV series)	Workman	Season 2 Episode 44: "Penguin's Disastrous End"
1968	Bewitched (TV series)	Helper	Season 4 Episode 24: "How Green Was My Grass"
1968	Here Come the Brides (TV series)	Jason's Man	Season 1 Episode 1: "Here Come the Brides"
1968	Here Come the Brides (TV series)	Pebbles	Season 1 Episode 7: "Lovers and Wanderers"
1968	The F.B.I. (TV series)	Chico Jordan	Season 3 Episode 22: "The Messenger"
1968	The F.B.I. (TV series)	Dr. Malotte	Season 4 Episode 3: "The Quarry"
1969	Hook, Line and Sinker	Portuguese Gas Station Attendant	Jerry Lewis comedy; uncredited role
1969	Mod Squad	Wilson	Season 1 Episode 15: "Flight Five Doesn't Answer"
1970	The Bold Ones: The Lawyers (TV series)	Sergeant Vriggs	Season 1 Episode 7: "Point of Honor"
1974-1975	Get Christie Love! (TV series)	Joe Caruso / Russo	10 episodes
1976	Quincy, M.E. (TV series)	Patrick Kendal	Season 1 Episode 2: "Who's Who in Neverland"
1977	M*A*S*H (TV series)	Sergeant Justiss	Season 5 Episode 23: "Post-Op"
1979	The One Man Jury	Chickie	Feature film role
1979	Over the Edge	Fred Willat	Feature film role
1979	Love and Bullets	Marty	Feature film role
1981	Magnum P.I. (TV series)	Clarence Burnside	Season 1 Episode 13: "All Roads Lead to Floyd"
1982-1987	Hill Street Blues (TV series)	Deputy Chief Warren Briscoe (one episode as Captain Macpherson)	12 episodes (recurring role)
1984	The A-Team (TV series)	Mr. Dubio	Season 3 Episode 12: "Hot Styles"
1984	T.J. Hooker (TV series)	Lieutenant Stafford	Season 4 Episode 4: "Hardcore Connection"
1985	T.J. Hooker (TV series)	CIA Agent Tom Merrick	Season 5 Episode 5: "The Assassin"
1987	Return to Horror High	Mr. Kastleman	Horror film
1987	Rampage	Spencer Whalen	Feature film role
1987	P.I. Private Investigations	Mr. Watson	
1987	Highway to Heaven (TV series)	Caz	Season 4 Episode 8: "All the Colors of the Night"
1988	Highway to Heaven (TV series)	Caz	Season 4 Episode 17: "We Have Forever, Part 1"
1988	Highway to Heaven (TV series)	Caz	Season 4 Episode 18: "We Have Forever, Part 2"
1988	Kansas	Fleener	Feature film role
1988	Remo Williams: The Prophecy	Derek Boland, The Assassin	
1989	Major League	Pepper Leach	Supporting role
1989	Columbo	Sergeant Major Lester Keegan	Season 8 Episode 4: "Grand Deceptions"
1989	Paint It Black	Mark Cuniff	Feature film role
1990	Pump Up the Volume	Murdock	
1991	Pizza Man	The Hood	
1991	Mobsters	Antonio Luciano	Supporting role
1991	Bugsy	Del Webb	Supporting role
1992	Unlawful Entry	Captain Russell Hayes	
1992	The Gun in Betty Lou's Handbag	Herrick	
1992	Under Siege	Admiral Bates	Supporting role
1993	The Fugitive	Judge Bennett	Supporting role
1994	Drop Zone	U.S. Marshals Deputy Director Tom McCracken	
1995	Chameleon	Giovanni Pazatto	
1995	Rough Magic	Clayton	
1995	Under Siege 2: Dark Territory	Admiral Bates	Supporting role
1995	Two Bits	Dr. Bruna	
1995	Steal Big Steal Little	Clifford Downey	
1996	Eraser	Daniel Harper	Supporting role
1996	Ghosts of Mississippi	Hardy Lott	Supporting role
1996	Getting Away with Murder	The Psychiatrist	Small role
1999	Heaven or Vegas	Mr. Hodges	
