= Bikini Beach =

1964 film by William Asher

- theatrical release poster
- Directed by: William Asher
- Written by: William Asher; Robert Dillon; Leo Townsend
- Produced by: Samuel Z. Arkoff; James H. Nicholson
- Starring: Frankie Avalon; Annette Funicello; Martha Hyer; Harvey Lembeck; Don Rickles; John Ashley; Joel McCrea; Candy Johnson; Stevie Wonder; The Pyramids; Keenan Wynn
- Cinematography: Floyd Crosby
- Edited by: Fred R. Feitshans, Jr.
- Music by: Les Baxter; Alice Simms
- Production company: American International Pictures
- Distributed by: American International Pictures
- Release date: July 22, 1964 (U.S.)
- Running time: 100 minutes
- Country: United States
- Language: English
- Budget: $500,000 or $175,000
- Box office: $4.5 million (US rentals)

Bikini Beach is a 1964 American teen film directed by William Asher and starring Frankie Avalon and Annette Funicello. The film belongs to the beach party genre of movies, popular in the 1960s. This is the third in the series of seven films produced by American International Pictures (AIP).

== Plot ==
School is out and the teenagers head for the beach. All is well until millionaire Harvey Huntington Honeywagon III comes around, convinced that the beachgoers are so senselessly obsessed with sex that their mentality is below that of a primate – especially Honeywagon's wunderkind pet chimp Clyde, who can surf, drive, and watusi better than anyone on the beach. With the teenagers demoralized and discredited, Honeywagon plans to turn Bikini Beach into a senior citizens retirement home.

Meanwhile, foppish British rocker and drag racer Peter Royce Bentley, better known as "The Potato Bug", has taken up residence on Bikini Beach. Annoyed by Frankie's reluctance to start their relationship towards marriage, Dee Dee becomes receptive to Potato Bug's advances. In a jealous rage, Frankie challenges The Potato Bug to a drag race, in hopes of winning Dee Dee back.

== Cast ==
- Annette Funicello as Dee Dee
- Frankie Avalon as Frankie / Potato Bug (Peter Royce Bentley)
- Keenan Wynn as Harvey Huntington Honeywagon III
- Martha Hyer as Vivian Clements
- Harvey Lembeck as Eric Von Zipper
- Don Rickles as Big Drag
- John Ashley as Johnny
- Jody McCrea as Deadhead
- Candy Johnson as Candy, the 'Watusi' girl
- Danielle Aubry as Yvonne, the Lady Bug
- Elizabeth Montgomery as the voice of Yvonne, the Lady Bug
- Meredith MacRae as Animal
- Delores Wells as Sniffles
- Donna Loren as Donna
- Janos Prohaska as Clyde
- Timothy Carey as South Dakota Slim
- Little Stevie Wonder as himself
- The Pyramids as Themselves
- Alberta Nelson as Puss/Alberta
- Mary Hughes as Beach Girl
- Salli Sachse as Beach Girl
- Linda Bent as Beach Girl
- Patti Chandler as Beach Girl
- Boris Karloff as Art Dealer

== Production notes ==
=== Script ===
The film was announced in June 1963 even before Beach Party was released.

In a FILMFAXplus (April/June 2004) interview, director William Asher revealed that the script was originally written for The Beatles. According to Asher's claim, the group had agreed to act in the film but later dropped out as their rapidly growing fame (especially after their 1964 appearance on The Ed Sullivan Show) caused their fee to exceed the film's budget. Asher was forced to rework the script. Frankie Avalon's dual role as an English singer named "The Potato Bug" was created to replace the four Beatles in the story.

United Artists had signed a three-movie deal with the Beatles in late 1963. This casts doubt on the veracity of Asher's claim.

According to Avalon, AIP "did a survey because they wanted to know how much surfing they should put in these pictures after the first and second one. It really wasn't the surfing that was the attraction in those films. It was the fun and the puppy love between Frankie and Annette."

The film was the first made by AIP following a decision from the studio in April 1964 to ban smoking in its films. Production started 20 April. "Our films can set an example by showing the smoking need not be part of every day life," said a studio spokesman.

=== Cast ===
Don Rickles plays Big Drag, proprietor of The Pit Stop, a teen hangout where several musical numbers are performed. He also manages a garage for dragsters and is the announcer at the Bikini Beach Drag Strip. When Deadhead says he looks familiar, Big Drag admits he was once Jack Fanny, his character from the earlier film, Muscle Beach Party.

Pop singer Donna Loren appears for the second time. She was previously in Muscle Beach Party, and also appeared in Pajama Party and Beach Blanket Bingo. She sang at least one solo in each movie. Little Stevie Wonder, also from Muscle Beach Party returned for a bit part as well.

Unusual character actor Timothy Carey appears briefly in this film as "South Dakota Slim", and has a larger part as the same character in Beach Blanket Bingo. His character is replaced by "North Dakota Pete" (played by Len Lesser) in How to Stuff a Wild Bikini.

Nineteen-year-old Val Warren, who is billed as Teenage Werewolf in the film's closing credits, was the first prize winner in Forrest J Ackerman's Famous Monsters of Filmland magazine's National Horror Makeup Contest (beating out Rick Baker, who would later go on to win three Oscars for makeup artistry). Included in first prize was a trip to Hollywood and an appearance in Bikini Beach. Warren stated in a reply to the Los Angeles Times report of Ackerman's death, "When director William Asher requested that I growl during my brief sequence, my ever-protective agent, 'Uncle' Forry quickly reminded him that said role had now become a 'speaking part' and, as such, I was entitled to a cast credit as well as the Screen Actors Guild pay standard of an additional 250 bucks. When Asher consented, Forry, like the big kid he was, expressed his delight by turning to face me with a beaming smile and an exaggerated wink."

During filming Hedda Hopper reported that Jody McCrea had been annoying girls on set. "He acts as though they're just there for his pleasure", said one person connected to the film.

At the end of the previous film Muscle Beach Party, end titles revealed that Peter Lorre would reprise his character in Bikini Beach. Lorre died of a stroke on 23 March 1964, just a few weeks before he was to film Bikini Beach. Lorre's death led to Boris Karloff replacing him. Filming started 20 April.

=== Props ===
The dragsters used in the drag racing scenes (shot at Pomona Raceway) were very popular – and successful – at the time. They include: Dean Jeffries' "Manta Ray", Larry Stellings' "Britannica", the Greer, Black and Prudhomme fuel dragster "Freida" – driven by Don Prudhomme and "Swinger II"- driven by Harry Payne. 'TV' Tommy Ivo's fuel dragster and four-Buick-engined "Showboat" dragster – the one Clyde drives to a new speed record. Ivo was also a technical advisor for the film, as well as go-kart champ Von Deming – billed in the credits with the title, "West Coast Go-Kart Champion".

The surfboards used in this film (as well as the earlier Muscle Beach Party) were by Phil of Downey, California – aka Phil Sauer, the maker of "Surfboards of the Stars". Sauer was also the stunt coordinator for another beach party film that used his surfboards, Columbia Pictures' Ride the Wild Surf, which was released the following month. Sauer was even portrayed in that film as a character by Mark LaBuse.

== Music ==
The original score for this film, like Muscle Beach Party before it, was composed by Les Baxter.

Guy Hemric and Jerry Styner wrote several songs for the film:

- "Bikini Beach" – performed by the cast;
- "Love's a Secret Weapon" – sung by Donna Loren;
- "Gimmie Your Love" – sung by Avalon;
- "This Time It's Love" – sung by Funicello;
- Because You're You" – sung by Avalon and Funicello.

Hemric and Styner also wrote two songs that featured The Pyramids doing back up:

- "How About That?", – sung as a duet by Avalon
- "Happy Feelin’ (Dance and Shout)" – sung by Little Stevie Wonder.

The Pyramids performed two additional songs – both which were written by Gary Usher and Roger Christian for the film:

- "Record Run"
- "Bikini Drag" – Instrumental

Candy Johnson's band, The Exciters, perform:

- "Gotcha Where I Wantcha" – written by Jack Merrill and Red Gilson.

== Cultural references ==
- The Potato Bug name is a not-so-subtle reference to The Beatles. The character is a permutation of John Lennon, albeit with a persona based on British stereotypes as perceived by Americans, and made popular by English comics like Terry-Thomas. Filmink argued "Avalon had a real gift for broad character acting that was accessed far too rarely."
- Keenan Wynn's character's surname, "Honeywagon" is a reference to the so-named portable toilets used in the film and television industry and at campgrounds and marinas – thus Frankie's reply upon hearing Honeywagon's name: "I'd keep that quiet if I were you."
- Timothy Carey's pool-playing character's name "South Dakota Slim" is a play on the pool shark character "Minnesota Fats" that Jackie Gleason played three years previous in the film, The Hustler.
- Boris Karloff's cameo (seen only from behind until the end) is a riff on Vincent Price's commercials for "the Vincent Price Collection of Fine Art" being offered at Sears at the time. Price wore a similar costume (red cape, black hat) in his commercials, and after appearing in Beach Party doing a similar gag (and a few other AIP films over the last year), the audience would assume they would be seeing Price again, thus creating a punchline when fellow spookster Karloff is revealed.

== Reception ==
Eugene Archer of The New York Times panned the film as "a horrible juvenile comedy." Kevin Thomas of the Los Angeles Times wrote, "A couple of truckloads of good-looking healthy kids, plenty of singing and dancing, and solid comedy from some old pros add up to two hours of mindless relaxation at theaters and drive-ins everywhere." Variety stated, "Introduction of some first-rate satire is so overloaded with coatings of slapstick that the satire will be lost on the great mass of youngsters who will provide the film's major support but it does make 'Bikini Beach' more palatable for parents or pseudo-sophisticates among the teenagers who find themselves viewing it." The Monthly Film Bulletin noted that "this new film, which merely repeats some of the features of Beach Party, with some uninventive new material, is a good deal less attractive."

Filmink argued the movie "returned to the Beach Party formula of including everything but the kitchen sink" and "has maybe the best music in the series."

== See also ==
- List of American films of 1964
