= Leo Townsend (writer) =

American screenwriter of films and television

- Born: 1908
- Died: 1987 (aged 78–79)
- Occupation: Screenwriter
- Known for: Film and television screenwriting; testimony as a friendly witness before HUAC

Leo Townsend (1908–1987) was an American screenwriter of films and television.

He was a friendly witness to the House Un-American Activities Committee.

== Select credits ==
- It Started with Eve (1941)
- I'd Rather Be Rich (1964)
- Bikini Beach (1964)
- Beach Blanket Bingo (1965)
- How to Stuff a Wild Bikini (1965)
- Fireball 500 (1966)
