= Beach Blanket Bingo =

1965 film by William Asher

- theatrical poster
- Directed by: William Asher
- Written by: Leo Townsend; William Asher
- Produced by: Samuel Z. Arkoff; James H. Nicholson
- Starring: Frankie Avalon; Annette Funicello; Deborah Walley; Harvey Lembeck; John Ashley; Jody McCrea; Donna Loren; Marta Kristen; Linda Evans; Bobbi Shaw; Don Rickles; Paul Lynde; Buster Keaton; Earl Wilson
- Cinematography: Floyd Crosby
- Edited by: Eve Newman; Fred R. Feitshans Jr.
- Music by: Les Baxter
- Production company: American International
- Distributed by: American International
- Release date: April 7, 1965
- Running time: 98 minutes
- Country: United States
- Language: English
- Budget: $175,000

Beach Blanket Bingo is a 1965 American beach party film directed by William Asher. It is the fifth film in the Beach Party film series. The film stars Frankie Avalon, Annette Funicello, Linda Evans, Deborah Walley, Paul Lynde, and Don Rickles. Earl Wilson and Buster Keaton appear. Evans's singing voice was dubbed by Jackie Ward. It was the last time Avalon had the lead in a beach party film.

== Plot ==
A singer, Sugar Kane, is unwittingly being used for publicity stunts for her latest album by her agent, for example, faking a skydiving stunt, actually performed by Bonnie (Deborah Wally).

Meanwhile, Frankie, duped into thinking he rescued Sugar Kane, takes up skydiving at Bonnie's prompting; she secretly wants to make her boyfriend Steve jealous. This prompts Dee Dee to also try free-falling. Eric Von Zipper and his Rat Pack bikers also show up, with Von Zipper falling madly in love with Sugar Kane. Meanwhile, Bonehead falls in love with a mermaid named Lorelei.

Eventually, Von Zipper "puts the snatch" on Sugar Kane, and in a Perils of Pauline-like twist, the evil South Dakota Slim kidnaps Sugar and ties her to a buzz-saw.

== Cast ==
- Frankie Avalon as Frankie
- Annette Funicello as Dee Dee
- Harvey Lembeck as Eric Von Zipper
- John Ashley as Steve
- Deborah Walley as Bonnie
- Jody McCrea as Bonehead
- Marta Kristen as Lorelei
- Linda Evans as Sugar Kane
- Don Rickles as Big Drop
- Paul Lynde as Bullets
- Donna Loren as Donna
- Timothy Carey as South Dakota Slim
- Buster Keaton as Buster
- Bobbi Shaw as Bobbi
- Earl Wilson as himself
- Michael Nader as Butch
- Donna Michelle as Animal
- Patti Chandler as Patti
- Andy Romano as J.D.
- Alberta Nelson as Puss
- Myrna Ross as Boots
- Chris Cranston as Beach Girl
- Mary Hughes as Beach Girl
- Salli Sachse as Beach Girl
- Linda Bent as Beach Girl

Cast notes:

- Beach Blanket Bingo was Frankie Avalon's last starring role in the beach party films. He appears for only a few minutes in How to Stuff a Wild Bikini and not at all in The Ghost in the Invisible Bikini.
- Donna Michelle, who portrays Animal, was Playboy magazine's Playmate of the Year for 1964.
- Bobbi Shaw once again plays her "ya, ya" Swedish bombshell role.
- Though this was Rickles' fourth film in the series, it's the only one in which he stepped out of his character in one scene and does a little of his night-club act, tossing some barbs at the characters, notably asking why Avalon and Funicello were in the picture, teasing "You're 40 years old!"

== Production ==
Cast and character changes

The part of Sugar Kane, played by Linda Evans, was intended for Nancy Sinatra. This change was due in part to the fact that the plot involved a kidnapping, somewhat reminiscent of her brother Frank Sinatra Jr.'s kidnapping a few months before shooting began. That made her uncomfortable, causing her to drop out.

Elsa Lanchester was announced for a small role off the back of her performance in Pajama Party but does not appear in the final film.

The character of Deadhead in Beach Party, Muscle Beach Party and Bikini Beach is called Bonehead in this film because AIP had decided the term Deadhead was a so-called "bankable noun" and had decided to cast Avalon as the title character of its upcoming Sergeant Deadhead. The Rat Pack leader character Eric Von Zipper is given more screen time in this third film. He gets to sing his own song titled "Follow Your Leader" (which he reprises as "I Am My Ideal" for the follow-up How to Stuff a Wild Bikini).

John Ashley, who played Ken in Beach Party, and Johnny in both Muscle Beach Party and Bikini Beach, returns in this movie as Steve, playing opposite his real-life wife Deborah Walley. According to Diabolique magazine, the Beach Party movies "weren't all about songs, sex, and surfing; they were also about friendship, and you really notice the entries where the lead male isn't good friends with Ashley – in Beach Blanket Bingo it's downright stressful to see him and Avalon as strangers." Walley signed a multi picture contract with AIP which "used her as a sort of back up Annettee Funicello".

Deleted sequences and songs

- After the sequence wherein Frankie sings "These Are the Good Times":

Dee Dee leaves the beach club and sings "I'll Never Change Him" by herself at the beach house.(This sequence can still be seen in 16mm prints and television broadcasts of Beach Blanket Bingo, but the Region 1 MGM DVD omits it. See Music section below)

- After Frankie completes his skydiving jump:

Bonehead asks Frankie if Lorelei and himself can double-date with Frankie and Dee Dee;

Bonehead then goes to a dress shop to get Lorelei's clothes – where an older saleslady flirts with him as he tries to illustrate Lorelei's dress size;

A strolling Frankie and Dee Dee see Bonehead with his arms around the older saleslady and figure she must be his date;

- After Bonehead brings Lorelei her clothes and shoes:

Frankie and Dee Dee arrive to pick them up, and the four of them sing "A Surfer's Life For Me" as they drive to the beach club in Frankie's hot rod coupe. Then, as seen in the release print, the two couples arrive together at the beach club as the Hondells are performing "The Cycle Set".

== Music ==
The score for this movie, like the four preceding it, was composed by Les Baxter.

Guy Hemric and Jerry Styner wrote seven songs for the movie:

- "Beach Blanket Bingo" – sung by Frankie Avalon and Annette Funicello with the cast
- "I Think You Think" – performed by Avalon and Funicello
- "These Are the Good Times" – sung by Avalon
- "It Only Hurts When I Cry" – sung by Donna Loren; the version sung in the movie differs from the commercially-released version recorded by Loren later in 1965
- "Follow Your Leader" – sung by Harvey Lembeck with the "Rat Pack"
- "New Love" and "Fly Boy" – both sung by studio call vocalist Jackie Ward off-screen – and lip-synched by Linda Evans onscreen

Gary Usher and Roger Christian wrote three songs:

- "Cycle Set" – performed by the Hondells
- "Freeway" (instrumental) – performed by the Hondells
- "I'll Never Change Him" – performed by Annette Funicello, and although this song was included in initial prints, it was excised for wide release when the decision was made to feature the song as "We'll Never Change Them" in Ski Party

== Comic book adaption ==
Dell Comics published a 12 cent comic book version of Beach Blanket Bingo, with 36 colour pages, in conjunction with the movie's release.

== Reception ==
Howard Thompson of The New York Times wrote "We simply can't believe, no matter what the reports say, that the teen-agers buy such junk. It's for morons."

Variety wrote, "No one can blame Nicholson and Arkoff for continuing a pattern that has made them money, but this is ridiculous. Are teenagers responding to such drivel as good natured satire of themselves rather than identifying with it? Let's hope so."

Margaret Harford of the Los Angeles Times wrote that "Some of it is pretty silly," but the movie "is best when it is giving the kids a sly drubbing. Its teen-age inanities are not nearly so dull as its adult presumptuousness. For example: Columnist Earl Wilson hovering awkwardly around as a talent spotter. Earl looks as though he'd give a pearl or two just to be back in his less strenuous New York haunts."

Filmink wrote it "is a grab bag as a movie. It has an odd feel: things like John Ashley playing a rival to Avalon rather than his friend; Walley's fake rape allegation against Avalon after he spurns her (this story lasts two scenes, as if the filmmakers knew it was a bad idea the minute they introduced it); Frankie sings this weird ballad and his character seems particularly obnoxious; Don Rickles does some unfunny nightclub act schtick; columnist Earl Wilson plays himself, as if anyone cares."

== Legacy ==
Frankie Avalon later recalled "'That's the picture of mine that I think people remember best, and it was just a lot of kids having a lot of fun — a picture about young romance and about the opposition of adults and old people. There's nothing that young people respond to more than when adults say `These kids are nuts,` and that's what this movie was about. It was also fun because we got to learn how to fake skydive out of an airplane."

- The title of this movie inspired the title for Steve Silver's 1974 play Beach Blanket Babylon, which has become America's longest-running musical revue.
- The March 5, 1978 episode of The Carol Burnett Show featured "Beach Blanket Boo-Boo", a parody of the film with Burnett as "Nanette Vermacelli" and Steve Martin as "Frankie Travelon".
- The November 18, 1978 episode of Saturday Night Live featured "Beach Blanket Bimbo from Outer Space," a parody of the film with Gilda Radner as Annette Funicello, Bill Murray as Frankie Avalon, Carrie Fisher as Princess Leia, Dan Aykroyd as Vincent Price, and Garrett Morris as Chubby Checker.
- In the 1983 film The Outsiders, set in the mid-1960s, Beach Blanket Bingo is shown playing at a drive-in.
- An excerpt from the title song and a partial scene from Beach Blanket Bingo, dubbed into Vietnamese, is included in the 1987 film Good Morning, Vietnam.
- In the May 21, 1989 Season 3, Episode 21 ("Life's a Beach") of the American sitcom Married... with Children, Marcy sees a bodybuilder walk by on the beach and remarks "Ooh. Ooh. Ooh. Beach blanket bingo over here, babycakes."

== See also ==
- List of American films of 1965

== Bibliography ==
- McParland, Stephen J. (1994). It's Party Time - A Musical Appreciation of the Beach Party Film Genre. Riverside, California, USA: PTB Productions. ISBN 0-9601880-2-9.
- "Beach Blanket Bingo". Dell Movie Classic. Dell Publishing Inc. July–September 1965.
