= Fireball 500 =

1966 film by William Asher

- Directed by: William Asher
- Written by: William Asher; Leo Townsend
- Produced by: James H. Nicholson; Samuel Z. Arkoff; Burt Topper
- Starring: Frankie Avalon; Annette Funicello; Fabian; Chill Wills; Harvey Lembeck; Julie Parrish
- Cinematography: Floyd Crosby
- Edited by: Fred R. Feitshans, Jr. Eve Newman
- Music by: Les Baxter
- Production company: American International Pictures
- Distributed by: American International Pictures
- Release date: June 7, 1966
- Running time: 92 minutes
- Country: United States
- Language: English
- Box office: $2 million (est. US/ Canada rentals)

Fireball 500 is a 1966 stock car racing film, blended with the beach party film genre. A vehicle for stars Frankie Avalon, Annette Funicello, and Fabian, it was one of a string of similar racing films from the 1960s. Written by William Asher and Leo Townsend, and directed by William Asher, it tells the story of Dave Owens (Avalon), a stock car racer forced to run moonshine.

== Plot ==
Stock car racer "Fireball" Dave Owens from California goes to race in Spartanburg, South Carolina, where he intends on competing against local champ Sonny Leander Fox. Dave beats Leander in a race, impressing the latter's girlfriend, Jane, and the wealthy Martha Brian.

Martha persuades Dave to drive in a cross country night race, not telling him he is actually smuggling moonshine. She and her partner, Charlie Bigg, are pleased with Dave's results. Leander, who runs his own still and smuggling operation, is impressed with Dave's success, but this does not change the fact that he wants to beat Dave on the track, even challenging him to a dangerous figure-8 race which ends in a draw.

Agents from the IRS threaten to send Dave to six months in jail unless he helps them bust the local moonshine ring.

After a driver, Joey, is killed during a run, Dave and Leander agree to team up to investigate the accident. They discover that it was caused by someone placing a huge mirror across the road. It turns out that Martha's moonshining partner, Charlie Bigg, was solely responsible for the murder of Joey and also tried to kill Dave because he was jealous that the young California driver is sleeping with her.

Dave wins the big race but Leander is badly burned. Jane helps him recover and Dave drives off into the sunset with Martha.

== Cast ==
- Frankie Avalon as Dave "Fireball" Owens
- Annette Funicello as Jane Harris
- Fabian as Sonny Leander Fox
- Harvey Lembeck as Charlie Bigg
- Chill Wills as "Big Jaw" Harris
- Julie Parrish as Martha Brian
- Sandy Reed as Race Announcer
- Douglas Henderson as Hastings
- Baynes Barron as Bronson
- Ed Garner as Herman
- Mary Hughes as Leander Fan
- Salli Sachse as Leander Fan
- Patti Chandler as Leander Fan
- Linda Bent as Leander Fan
- Sue Hamilton as Farmer's Daughter
- Mike Nader as Joey
- Vin Scully as The Narrator (prologue)

== Production notes ==
=== Development ===
The movie was part of a conscious attempt on AIP to move away from beach party movies, which were losing popularity, and go towards youth rebellion films such as Fireball 500 and The Wild Angels. AIP executive Deke Heyward said that:

The next big thing for teenage films is protest. Teenagers empathize with protest because they are in revolt against their parents... These films represent a protest against society. These will be moral tales, there will be good guys and bad guys. But we will show the reasons for young people going against the dictates of the establishment.

Stock car racing had already been the subject of Red Line 7000 but this movie would be specifically told from the teenagers point of view.

Director William Asher had made five beach party films for AIP with Avalon and Funicello. He co wrote the film with Leo Townsend, who had helped Asher write three of the beach party movies. Asher said "for the first time in these pictures we have a love affair consummated. And before marriage." Frankie Avalon's character got to have sex.

Fabian signed a multi picture deal with AIP in late 1965 and this was the first movie he made for them. He was meant to follow it with Robinhood Jones for AIP but that was never made. Frankie Avalon made it under his contract with AIP to be in two films a year for three years.

=== Shooting ===
The film was shot starting 9 March 1966. (The same month AIP began filming Hells Angels on Wheels.)

The "Fireball 500" is a 1966 Plymouth Barracuda, heavily customized by George Barris, with a standard 273 cubic inch V-8 engine that develops 275 h.p. At one point in the film, the car is referred to as the Batmobile, prompting Frankie Avalon's character to quip, "I had mine first.” Barris also built the Batmobile for the Batman television show which premiered in January 1966.

Footage from Fireball 500, specifically shots of the 4B car (Jim Douglas' car) toppling over on its roof, show up later in the demolition derby scenes at the beginning of The Love Bug. When making the film AIP would hire a race car driver and install cameras in the front and rear of his car to obtain shots. The film is notable for its depiction of the inherently dangerous Figure 8 racing.

It was the first movie Funicello made after the birth of her daughter.

Funicello and Fabian starred together again (without Avalon) the following year in AIP's follow-up feature, Thunder Alley.

Future director Randal Kleiser appeared in the film as an extra. Kleiser would later direct Avalon in Grease.

=== Music ===
The film's soundtrack is by Les Baxter, and features six songs written by Guy Hemric and Jerry Styner:

- "Fireball 500" - sung by Frankie Avalon over the opening credits;
- "My Way" (not to be confused with the song made popular by Frank Sinatra) - sung by Frankie Avalon and The Don Randi Trio Plus One;
- "Step Right Up" - sung by Annette Funicello, The Don Randi Trio Plus One and The Carol Lombard Singers;
- "A Chance Like That" - sung by Frankie Avalon;
- "Country Carnival" - sung by Frankie Avalon and The Don Randi Trio Plus One at the carnival;
- "Turn Around" - sung by Frankie Avalon and Julie Parrish over the final credits.

== Reception ==
=== Box office ===
The film was a minor box office success earning rentals in North America between $1.5 million and $2 million.

=== Critical ===
Kevin Thomas of the Los Angeles Times said the film "leaves American International's beach formula pretty much intact despite William Asher's attempt to inject some sophistication into his story" but thought it was "always easy to watch" with "a brisk tempo, a stylish verve that leaps over large holes in the story." Bosley Crowther of The New York Times called it "a real turkey... one old bird that should have been cremated, not cooked." Variety called it "an admirable attempt, realized to a significant degree, to add drama to what had become standard teen pic fluff... A snappy pace that flags only in final minutes."

Sight and Sound wrote, "Marginally better than the comedies in the series, and the stock cars look good."

Filmink called it "one of the most transitional films you’ll see... a conscious attempt to evolve the beach party style into a new genre... the film isn’t bad, it’s just that the mixture of cars, serious drama and musical numbers does not entirely work."

=== Sequel ===
In July 1966 it was announced Burt Topper would produce a follow-up, Malibu 500 with a budget of $1.4 million. This became Thunder Alley starring Fabian and Funicello. A number of other stock car/racing films followed on from Fireball 500, including Track of Thunder (1967), Hell on Wheels (1967) and The Wild Racers (1968) (with Fabian).

== Bibliography ==
- Leonard Maltin's Movie Guide 2006, p. 428. New York: Penguin/New American Library, 2006.
