= Devil's Angels =

1967 film by Daniel Haller

- Theatrical release poster
- Directed by: Daniel Haller
- Written by: Charles B. Griffith
- Produced by: Roger Corman; Burt Topper
- Starring: John Cassavetes; Beverly Adams; Mimsy Farmer
- Cinematography: Richard Moore
- Edited by: Kenneth G. Crane; Ronald Steiner
- Music by: Mike Curb
- Production company: American International Pictures
- Distributed by: American International Pictures
- Release date: 1967
- Running time: 84 minutes
- Country: United States
- Language: English
- Box office: $4 million (rentals)

Devil's Angels (also known as The Checkered Flag) is a 1967 American outlaw biker film written by Charles B. Griffith and directed by Daniel Haller. It stars John Cassavetes.

== Plot ==
Cody (John Cassavetes) and his motorcycle gang, the Skulls, hear the story of how Butch Cassidy and his outlaw band lived in a secret area called Hole-in-the-Wall, where there are no police. Inspired, Cody tells the gang they're all going to Hole-in-the-Wall to live forever. Thus, they break their pal Funky out of jail and head out. On the road, the bikers terrorize a store owner at a gas stop and help themselves to his beer. They also destroy the RV of a couple who accidentally knock over one of their motorcycles. Returning to the highway, they later arrive in the small town of Brookville, where the citizens are holding their annual picnic. Shocked by the sudden appearance of the bikers, the mayor and others demand the sheriff kick them out. However, this sheriff is more conciliatory than most. He comes to an agreement with Cody that the Skulls camp on the beach and move on the next morning.

A local girl, fascinated by the gang, joins them for the ride to the beach. Meanwhile, the mayor and others agree the sheriff is mollycoddling the bikers. They feel he should force them out. At the beach, gang members drug and manhandle the local girl. Frightened, she runs away. The mayor seizes on this to falsely claim she was raped. The sheriff then reverses course and arrests Cody, forcing the rest of the bikers to leave the beach. But trouble is by no means over. To exact revenge, the Skulls arrange for the assistance of another motorcycle gang in getting some payback from the townspeople of Brookville. Meanwhile, the sheriff realizes the mayor lied about the supposed rape. He thus releases Cody. Reunited with his troop, Cody argues they should continue on to Hole-in-the-Wall. But the others, intent on retribution, outvote him.

The gang thus returns to Brookville. They capture the girl, her family, the mayor, and the sheriff for a mock trial. The mayor is found guilty and sentenced to a beating, which they proceed to administer. As for the girl, she is sentenced to be gang raped. As the sentence is carried out, Cody tries to stop them but to no avail. Meanwhile, riders from the other gang arrive. They initiate their own special brand of terror. Anarchy and mayhem rule Brookville. But Cody wants out. He asks one of his gang members where Hole-in-the-Wall is. He is told there is no such place. It was all a lie. He then turns to his girlfriend and asks her to leave with him, but she refuses. While fires and destruction consume the town, Cody tears off his Skulls jacket, throwing it to the ground. He then rides away, leaving the Skulls behind. As he departs, police cars are seen converging on Brookville to restore order.

== Cast ==
- John Cassavetes as Cody
- Beverly Adams as Lynn
- Mimsy Farmer as Marianne
- Maurice McEndree as Joel the Mole
- Leo Gordon as Sheriff Henderson
- Russ Bender as Royce
- Marc Cavell as Billy the Kid
- Buck Taylor as Gage
- Marianne Kanter as Rena
- Kipp Whitman as Roy
- Mitzi Hoag as Karen
- Nai Bonet as Tanya
- Buck Kartalian as Funky
- George Sims as Leroy
- Salli Sachse as Louise
- Wally Campo as Grog
- Lee Wainer as Cane

== Production ==
The filming begins in the vicinity of Point Fermin in San Pedro, CA. Scenes include a pan shot of Cabrillo Beach and motorcycle runs north and southbound on Gaffey Street, just below the upper reservation of Fort MacArthur as the Skulls start off to find to Hole-in-the-Wall. Filming took place in and around Patagonia, Arizona.

== Tagline ==
Violence is their god... and they hunt in a pack like rabid dogs!

== See also ==
- List of American films of 1967
