= The Wild Weird World of Dr. Goldfoot =

1965 American TV special

- Written by: Stanley Ross; Louis M. Heyward
- Directed by: Mel Ferber
- Starring: Vincent Price; Tommy Kirk; Aron Kincaid
- Music by: Les Baxter
- Country of origin: United States
- Original language: English

Production
- Producer: Louis M. Heyward
- Running time: 30 minutes
- Production company: AIP-TV

Original release
- Network: ABC
- Release: November 18, 1965

The Wild Weird World of Dr. Goldfoot was a 30-minute TV special which was a sequel to Dr. Goldfoot and the Bikini Machine (1965).

It aired on ABC as an episode of Shindig! in November 1965.

== Plot ==
Dr. Goldfoot and his assistant Hugo send their robot woman Diane to entrap Malcolm Andrews, who contains all the knowledge of the world in his head. Diane sets out to seduce Andrews but is stopped by government agent 00 1/2 of Security Intelligence Command (SIC). Diane and the agent begin a romance, and Goldfoot and Hugo capture Andrews.

Diane brings the agent to Goldfoot's lair where Goldfoot intends to kill him. However Diane turns against Goldfoot and overpowers him. There is a floorshow.

== Cast ==
- Vincent Price as Dr. Goldfoot
- Tommy Kirk as Malcolm Andrews
- Susan Hart as Diane
- Aron Kincaid as Agent 00½
- Harvey Lembeck as Hugo
- Patti Chandler
- Mary Hughes
- Salli Sachse
- Luree Holmes
- Sue Hamilton
- Ed Garner

== Production ==
According to Susan Hart, the film was the idea of Ruth Pologe, head of AIP publicity in the New York office, who arranged with ABC to do a special relating to the picture. Jack Baker did the choreography.

== Songs ==
Guy Hemric and Jerry Styner wrote the music and lyrics for the songs with Les Baxter as musical director. There are three main songs:

- "Dr Goldfoot and the Bikini Machine" – sung over the opening credits.
- "It Works" – a number sung by Hugo (Harvey Lembeck), explaining the machine.
- "What's a Boy Supposed to Do?" – a love duet between Susan Hart and Aron Kincaid.
- "Among the Young" – an instrumental number performed while Goldfoot's robots do a dance.

== Reception ==
The Boston Globe wrote "I am sure it drove away more customers than it attracted."
