= Mary Hughes (actress) =

American actress, model and groupie (1944–2007)

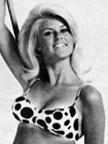
- Hughes in 1964
- Born: Mary Cecilia Hughes; February 25, 1944; Hollywood, California, U.S.
- Died: December 13, 2007 (aged 63); Malibu, California, U.S.
- Occupations: Actress, model
- Years active: 1964–1967 (film)

Mary Cecilia Hughes (February 25, 1944 – December 13, 2007) was an American actress and model, known for her small roles in several beach party films between 1964 and 1967. Hughes was also known for being a groupie, having relationships with musicians Eric Clapton, Roger Daltrey, and Jeff Beck, who mentions her by name in the Yardbirds' song "Psycho Daisies".

== Career ==
Hughes was discovered by director William Asher and played small roles as a "sexy blonde" beach bunny in several beach party films targeted to teenage audiences: Muscle Beach Party, Bikini Beach and Pajama Party, all three alongside Frankie Avalon and Annette Funicello (1964), plus Beach Blanket Bingo, Ski Party, How to Stuff a Wild Bikini and Dr. Goldfoot and the Bikini Machine in 1965, The Ghost in the Invisible Bikini, Murderer's Row and Fireball 500 in 1966, and Thunder Alley in 1967. Her looks (platinum blonde hair, tanned skin, 5-foot-9 height, and 36-22-36 measurements) earned her fame, while her roles rarely required her to utter a single sentence on screen.

After traveling to London to shoot what would be her last film, the musical comedy Double Trouble in 1967, where she appeared alongside Elvis Presley, Hughes became acquainted with the Swinging London scene, and had relationships with musicians Jeff Beck, Eric Clapton and Roger Daltrey. Jeff Beck composed the Yardbirds' song "Psycho Daisies" for her, where she is mentioned at the end of both verses:

New Orleans is the home of the blues,
But California's my home with Mary Hughes.
(...)
But back in California there's nothing to lose,
'Cause everything's swinging there with Mary Hughes.

She returned to the United States after marrying singer Lee Michaels in December 1968. The couple settled in Northern California where he raised wild animals, then divorced eighteen years later after they had two children. She remarried to Paul Zimmerman and moved to Malibu, California, where she taught yoga and fitness. She died of cancer on December 13, 2007.

== Filmography ==
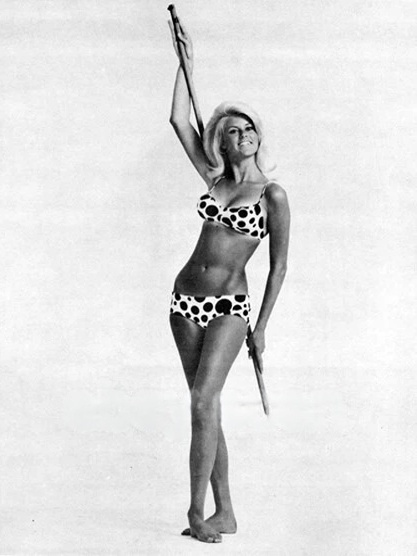
Hughes in a promotional picture for Bikini Beach (1964)

- Muscle Beach Party (1964) as Surfer Girl
- Bikini Beach (1964) as Beach Girl
- Pajama Party (1964) as Pajama Girl
- Beach Blanket Bingo (1965) as Beach Girl
- Ski Party (1965) as Mary
- How to Stuff a Wild Bikini (1965) as Beach Girl
- Sergeant Deadhead (1965) as W.A.F.
- Dr. Goldfoot and the Bikini Machine (1965) as Robot
- The Wild Weird World of Dr. Goldfoot (1965) (TV special)
- The Ghost in the Invisible Bikini (1966) as Mary
- Fireball 500 (1966) as Leander Fan
- Murderer's Row (1966) as Miss September
- Thunder Alley (1967) as Barmaid
- Double Trouble (1967) as Watusi Dancer (uncredited)
