= Salli Sachse =

American actress and model (1943–2025)

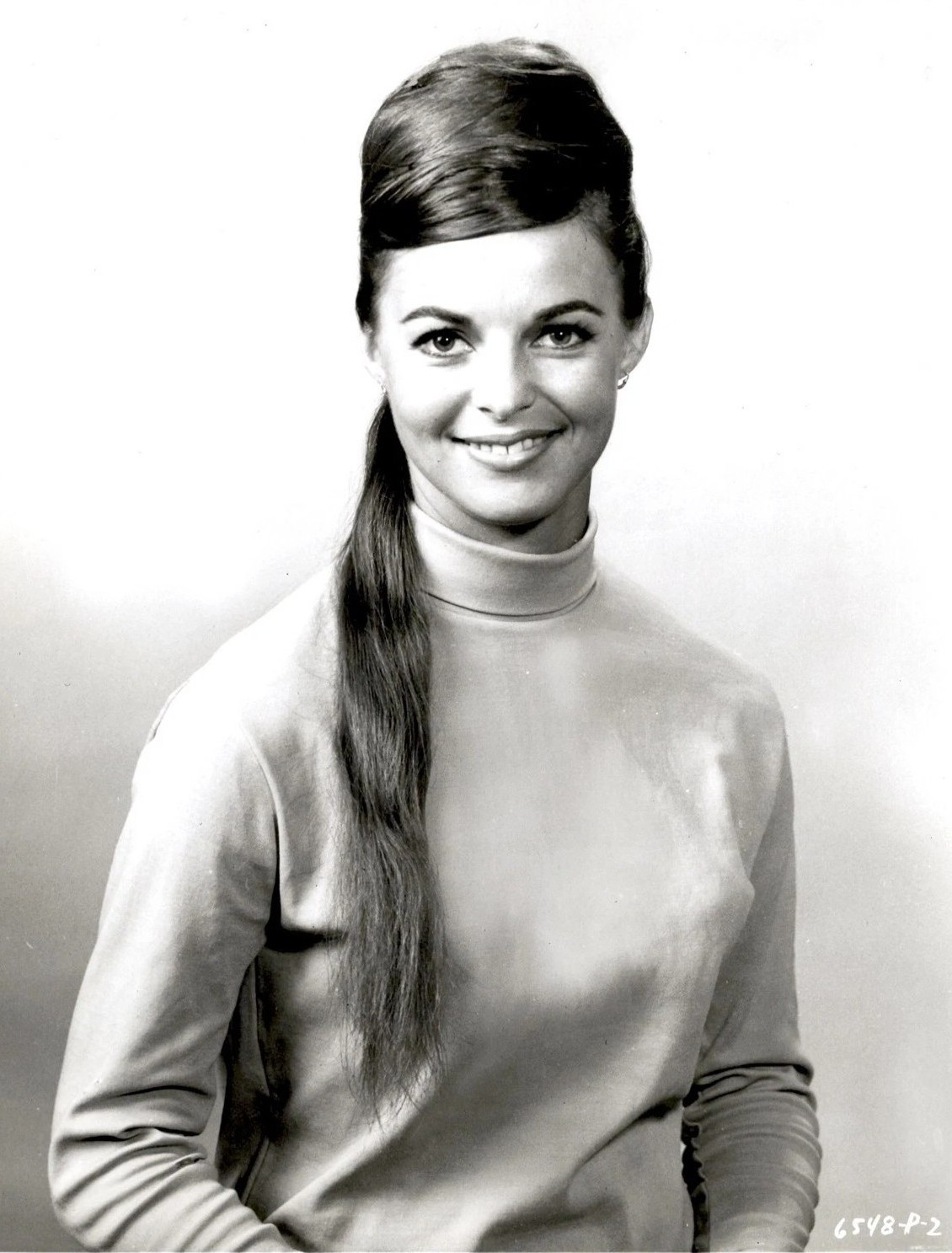
- Sachse in 1965
- Born: Sally Irene Rogers; June 25, 1943; San Diego, California, U.S.
- Died: September 8, 2025 (aged 82); California City, California, U.S.
- Occupations: Actress; model; photographer
- Years active: 1964–1969 (film and television)
- Spouse: Peter Sachse (m. 1963; died 1966)

Sally Irene Sachse (née Rogers; June 25, 1943 – September 8, 2025) was an American actress, model, and photographer who made about 20 film appearances between 1964 and 1969.

== Early life ==
Born Sally Irene Rogers in San Diego on June 25, 1943, she began her career as a model, becoming a Miss La Jolla beauty pageant winner and a Miss America runner-up.

== Career ==
According to her, she was discovered in early 1964 by a director near her home in La Jolla, California, who asked her if she would like to star in a beach party film. She soon landed a seven-year contract with American International Pictures.

Her first appearance was as a surfer girl in the film Muscle Beach Party (1964). She also appeared in Bikini Beach and Pajama Party, both also from 1964.

Sachse made appearances in various beach party films, including Beach Blanket Bingo (1965), How to Stuff a Wild Bikini (1965), and Dr. Goldfoot and the Bikini Machine (1965). She often appeared in the beach party films being paired with Linda Bent, with both having similar facial features and topknot hairdos, and they were known as "Bookend Girls", as they were often positioned on the opposite ends of a crowd of surfers in the films.

When the beach party craze ran its course, Sachse played drag strip groupies, biker chicks and the like in Fireball 500 (1966), Thunder Alley (1967), and Devil's Angels (1967). "Doing a biker film was very different than doing a beach movie," she told Tom Lisanti in an interview for his 2001 book Fantasy Femmes of Sixties Cinema. "All that familiarity and innocence of the beach movies was gone."

Sachse also appeared alongside another beach party film regular, Frankie Avalon, in The Million Eyes of Sumuru (1967). Afterwards, she was only seen in the films The Trip (1967), described by The Hollywood Reporter as "probably her best-known role", and Wild in the Streets (1968), and in an episode of the television series Mannix (1969), before she ended her acting career.

Sachse then became part of the entourage of Crosby, Stills, Nash & Young for two years as their personal photographer. In that capacity, she attended the Altamont Free Concert, remembered for the killing of Meredith Hunter, although she and the band had already left the concert by the time of the killing, becoming aware of the significant violence at the event. She would spend the 1970s living as an artist in Europe, and upon returning to the U.S., she earned a Bachelor of Fine Arts and a Master's degree in psychology.

== Personal life and death ==
In 1963, she married pre-medical student and folk singer Peter Sachse; he was 23 and she was 19. On July 12, 1966, Peter was killed in a plane crash alongside friend of the couple and husband of Salli's fellow beach party film colleague Linda Bent, Philip G. Bent, when the civilian-converted AT-6 owned and piloted by Philip G. Bent crashed near the WindanSea beach area of La Jolla when it pulled too low. The accident took place in front of Linda Bent and other beachgoers. At the time of the accident, Salli was in Hong Kong filming The Million Eyes of Sumuru; upon being notified of her husband's death, she abandoned the shooting and returned to the United States. (Note: Tom Lisanti in his book Fantasy Femmes of Sixties Cinema claims that she left after four days of shooting, while Glamour Girls of the Silver Screen claims it was after five days.) "This was a real marker in my life," she later explained. "I was struggling emotionally because I felt that my heart had been ripped out." She added that "[a]fter Pete's funeral, I moved back to Los Angeles and tried to keep busy," and, while the studio "was really great" and kept her under contract and still doing films like The Trip and Wild in the Streets after she was widowed, "[t]his was the beginning of a big change in my life—the fairytale sort of ruptured and blew up. I felt very sad for a long, long time. I had to do a lot to keep my head above water and to make myself feel good."

Sachse never remarried. In the early 1970s, she had a relationship with singer Jackson Browne, with Sachse claiming he wrote "Something Fine" for her.

Sachse died of unknown causes at her home in California City, California, on September 8, 2025, at the age of 82, according to her niece Catherine Schreiber.

== Filmography ==
- Muscle Beach Party (1964) as Surfer Girl
- Bikini Beach (1964) as Beach Girl
- Pajama Party (1964) as Pajama Girl (uncredited)
- Beach Blanket Bingo (1965) as Beach Girl
- Ski Party (1965) as Indian
- How to Stuff a Wild Bikini (1965) as Bookend #2
- Sergeant Deadhead (1965) as Sue Ellen
- Dr. Goldfoot and the Bikini Machine (1965) as Robot
- The Wild Weird World of Dr. Goldfoot (1965) as Robot
- The Ghost in the Invisible Bikini (1966) as Salli
- Fireball 500 (1966) as Leander Fan
- Thunder Alley (1967) as Barmaid
- Devil's Angels (1967) as Louise
- The Million Eyes of Sumuru (1967) as Mikki
- The Trip (1967) as Glenn
- Wild in the Streets (1968) as Hippie Mother
- Mannix (1969) (TV series, episode "The Girl Who Came in with the Tide") as Mona
- Full Tilt Boogie, Daddy-O (2025) as herself, posthumous release

== Bibliography ==
- Lisanti, Tom (2015). Fantasy Femmes of Sixties Cinema: Interviews with 20 Actresses from Biker, Beach, and Elvis Movies. McFarland. ISBN 978-1-4766-0116-8.
