= Patti Chandler =

American actress

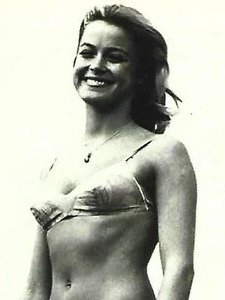
- Chandler in 1964
- Occupation: Actress
- Years active: 1964–1977 (film & TV)

Patti Chandler is an American actress.

== Career ==
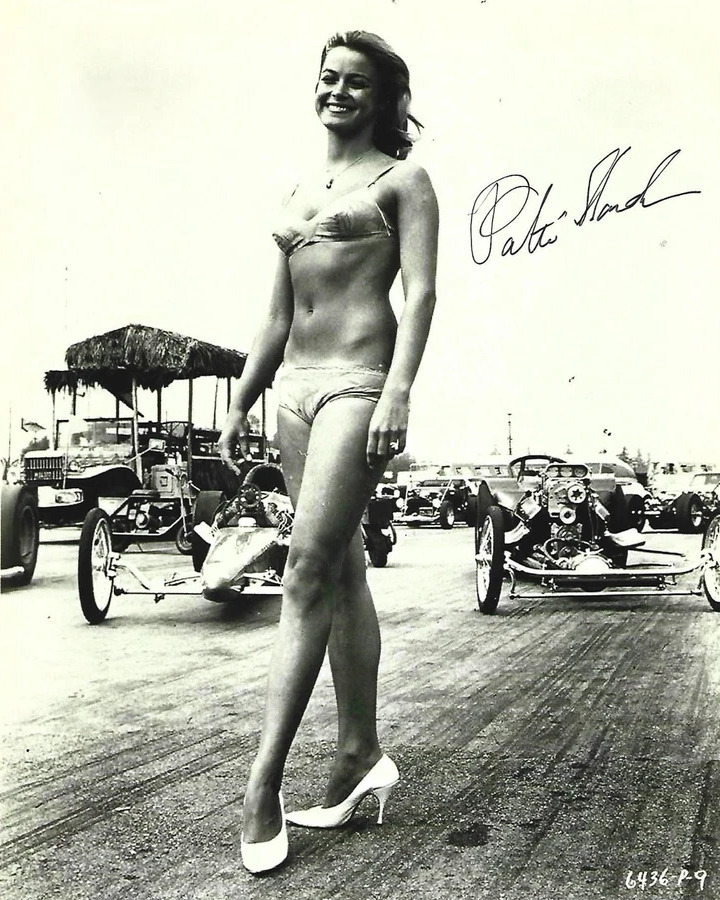
Chandler in a promotional picture for Bikini Beach (1964)

Patti Chandler first appeared as an actress in 1964 in the film Bikini Beach in a supporting role. This was followed by appearances in other beach party films, usually being paired with Salli Sachse, such as Pajama Party (1964), How to Stuff a Wild Bikini (1965) and The Ghost in the Invisible Bikini (1966). A Vanity Fair article about 1960s surf culture published on the August 2006 issue described Chandler as "Pert and adorable, Patti was more Sandra Dee than Dee herself." In addition, she also appeared in several television series. She retired from acting in 1977, after which she became a flight attendant.

== Selected filmography ==
- Bikini Beach (1964) as Beach Girl
- The Virginian (1964) (TV series, episode "A Father for Toby") as Margaret
- Pajama Party (1964) as Pajama Girl
- Beach Blanket Bingo (1965) as Patti
- Ski Party (1965) as Janet
- How to Stuff a Wild Bikini (1965) as Patti
- Sergeant Deadhead (1965) as Patti
- Dr. Goldfoot and the Bikini Machine (1965) as Robot
- The Ghost in the Invisible Bikini (1966) as Patti
- Fireball 500 (1966) as Leander Fan
- The Big Valley (1967) (TV series, episode "Plunder!") as Indian Girl
- The Million Eyes of Sumuru (1967) as Louise, slave of Sumuru
- Alias Smith and Jones (1971) (TV series, episode "Night of the Red Dog") as Secretary (credited as Patricia Chandler)
- Quincy, M.E. (1977) (TV series, episode "Hot Ice, Cold Hearts) as Ann (credited as Patricia Chandler)
- McCloud (1977) (TV series, episode "The Great Taxicab Stampede") as Police Woman (credited as Patricia Chandler)

== Bibliography ==
- Lisanti, Tom (2015). Fantasy Femmes of Sixties Cinema: Interviews with 20 Actresses from Biker, Beach, and Elvis Movies. McFarland. ISBN 978-1-4766-0116-8.
