= Bobbie Shaw Chance =

American actress

- Bobbi Shaw Chance in 1965
- Born: Barbara Shaw
- Occupation: Actress

Bobbie Shaw Chance (born Barbara Shaw) is an American actress most notable for her appearances in American International Pictures' beach party movies of the 1960s.

== Biography ==
Shaw was a singer and dancer in Las Vegas. She was spotted by a talent scout for American International Pictures and cast in Pajama Party (1964). Filmink called her a "breakout" actor from the movie.

Response was strong so she was cast in several more movies for the studio. After several films for AIP she worked with Rob Reiner, Larry Bishop, Richard Dreyfuss and others in the Los Angeles improvisational comedy troupe, The Sessions, for a number of years.

Bobbie Shaw married her husband Lawrence Chance and together they opened the Hollywood Actor's Showcase. She runs this with her son Richie Chance.

== Filmography ==
Year	Title	Role	Notes
1963	Passion Holiday	Miss Miami Rendezvous	
1964	Pajama Party	Helga	
1965	Beach Blanket Bingo	Bobbi	
1965	Ski Party	Nita Elksberg	
1965	How to Stuff a Wild Bikini	Khola Koku	
1965	Sergeant Deadhead	Gilda	
1966	The Ghost in the Invisible Bikini	Princess Yolanda	
1968	I Love You, Alice B. Toklas	Maid of Honor	Uncredited
1973	The Devil and LeRoy Bassett	Twila Zornes	
1974	You and Me	Wynona	
1976	Pipe Dreams	Slimey Sue	
1989	Big Man on Campus	Chicken Server	(final film role)
