= Sandy Reed =

American sports announcer (died 2004)

Sandy Reed (c. 1921 – February 7, 2004) was a track announcer with Ascot Park in Gardena, California, and the Riverside International Raceway in Riverside, California. He was in several movies, including Richard Rush's 1967 film Thunder Alley, the 1968 Elvis Presley film Speedway, and Fireball 500. He narrated an LP record that used audio clips, as well as interviews, to highlight the then-ascendant career of Riverside's home-track favorite, Dan Gurney.
