= The Nooney Rickett 4 =

American musical group

- Origin: United States
- Genres: Rock, pop
- Label: Tener Custom
- Past members: Nooney Rickett

The Nooney Ricket 4 (also known as The Nooney Rickett IV) was an American rock and roll group.

They appeared on television programs including Shindig! and in the films Winter A-Go-Go and Pajama Party.
