= Dr. Goldfoot and the Bikini Machine =

1965 film by Norman Taurog

- Theatrical release poster
- Directed by: Norman Taurog
- Screenplay by: Elwood Ullman; Robert Kaufman
- Story by: James Hartford
- Produced by: James H. Nicholson; Samuel Z. Arkoff
- Starring: Vincent Price; Frankie Avalon; Dwayne Hickman; Susan Hart; Jack Mullaney; Fred Clark
- Cinematography: Sam Leavitt
- Edited by: Ronald Sinclair; Fred R. Feitshans Jr.; Eve Newman
- Music by: Les Baxter
- Production company: American International Pictures
- Distributed by: American International Pictures
- Release date: November 6, 1965 (United States)
- Running time: 88 minutes
- Country: United States
- Language: English
- Budget: $1.5 million
- Box office: $1.9 million (est. US/Canada rentals)

Dr. Goldfoot and the Bikini Machine is a 1965 American comedy film directed by Norman Taurog and distributed by American International Pictures. Starring Vincent Price, Frankie Avalon, Dwayne Hickman, Susan Hart and Jack Mullaney, and featuring Fred Clark, the film is a parody of the then-popular spy trend (the title is a spoof of two James Bond films: the 1962 film Dr. No and the 1964 hit Goldfinger), made using actors from AIP's beach party and Edgar Allan Poe films. The film was retitled Dr G. and the Bikini Machine in England due to a threatened lawsuit from Eon, holder of the rights to the James Bond series.

Hickman called it "AIP's attempt to combine horror, bikini babe and secret agents and take advantage of the popularity of the James Bond pictures".

The film has achieved a certain cult status for the appearance of horror legend Price and AIP's beach party film alumni, its in-jokes and over-the-top sexuality, the claymation title sequence designed by Art Clokey, and a title song performed by the Supremes. Its success led to a sequel, produced in 1966, entitled Dr. Goldfoot and the Girl Bombs.

== Plot ==
Mad scientist Dr. Goldfoot has created an army of beautiful gynoids using his "bikini machine." These androids, dressed in gold bikinis, are programmed to seduce wealthy men and trick them into signing over their fortunes. Assisting him is his inept assistant Igor, who frequently bungles assignments but remains loyal.

One of the robots, Diane, mistakenly targets Secret Intelligence Command (SIC) agent Craig Gamble instead of millionaire Todd Armstrong. Gamble quickly becomes suspicious when Diane behaves strangely, eventually discovering she is a robot. This misstep leads to Gamble and Armstrong teaming up to uncover and stop Dr. Goldfoot's plan.

The heroes are captured and taken to Dr. Goldfoot’s underground lair, where they face various death traps, including a parody of the pendulum torture device. However, they manage to escape due to Igor’s incompetence. The film then moves into an extended chase sequence through the streets and iconic locations of San Francisco, involving cars, motorcycles, cable cars, and boats on trailers, all in slapstick fashion.

The pursuit ends near a U.S. Navy base, where Dr. Goldfoot’s vehicle plunges off a cliff into the ocean. Just as things appear resolved, the film concludes with a twist: Dr. Goldfoot, Igor, and Diane appear aboard the plane carrying Gamble and Armstrong, suggesting that Goldfoot’s schemes are far from over.

== Cast ==
- Vincent Price as Dr. Goldfoot
- Frankie Avalon as Craig Gamble
- Dwayne Hickman as Todd Armstrong
- Susan Hart as Diane
- Jack Mullaney as Igor
- Fred Clark as D. J. Pevney
- Alberta Nelson as reject No. 12
- Milton Frome as motorcycle cop
- Hal Riddle as newsvendor
- Joe Ploski as cook

Robots

- Patti Chandler
- Mary Hughes
- Salli Sachse
- Luree Holmes
- Sue Hamilton
- Laura Nicholson
- Marianne Gaba
- China Lee
- Issa Arnal
- Deanna Lund
- Pamela Rodgers
- Leslie Summers
- Sally Frei
- Kay Michaels
- Jan Watson
- Arlene Charles

Cameos

- Harvey Lembeck
- Deborah Walley
- Aron Kincaid
- Annette Funicello

Cast notes

- Frankie Avalon and Dwayne Hickman play the same characters they did in the previous year's Ski Party, except that the characters' names were swapped.
- Deborah Walley, who appeared with Avalon and Hickman in Ski Party and with Avalon in Beach Blanket Bingo, plays Avalon's date at the beginning.
- Annette Funicello makes a brief cameo appearance as a girl locked in medieval stocks in Dr. Goldfoot's lair. Frankie Avalon lifts her head, then looks at the camera and says, "It can't be!" Pregnant with her first child at the time, Funicello was placed in the stocks in order to hide her stomach.
- Harvey Lembeck also makes a cameo appearance as his Eric Von Zipper character, enchained along with his motorcycle in Goldfoot's lair. Lembeck also appeared as Goldfoot's assistant, Hugo, in the TV special The Wild Weird World of Dr. Goldfoot.
- Among the girls who play Goldfoot's robots are Deanna Lund, three years before joining the cast of Irwin Allen's science fiction series Land of the Giants; China Lee, a former Playboy Playmate married to Mort Sahl; Luree Holmes and Laura Nicholson, the daughters of James H. Nicholson; and Alberta Nelson, who was also in all seven of AIP's Beach Party films as a member of Eric Von Zipper's motorcycle gang, The Rat Pack.

== Production ==
The original idea for this motion picture came from James H. Nicholson, the President of American International Pictures, who wanted to showcase the versatile talents of AIP contract player Susan Hart. Nicholson provided the story, and is credited as "James Hartford". He hired Robert Kaufman, author of Ski Party, to write the first draft.

In March 1965 it was announced Dr Goldfoot and the Sex Machine would star Vincent Price and Frankie Avalon, and would be directed by William Asher, who had made several Beach Party movies for AIP (he was about to start How to Stuff a Wild Bikini in April and then make Jet Set Party (the latter would never be made). However, in June, Norman Taurog - who had just made Sergeant Deadhead for AIP - was announced as director.

Director Taurog hired Elwood Ullman to do a rewrite, and Taurog remained intimately involved with the content. Deke Heyward later claimed, without substantiation, that he completely rewrote Robert Kaufman's script.

It was the last of three films Hickman made in succession for AIP, the others being Ski Party and How to Stuff a Wild Bikini.

Patti Chandler, Mary Hughes and Salli Sachse were graduates of AIP's "Turn to Youth" program which had begun two years previously.

=== Shooting ===
Filming started 4 August 1965, with one of AIP's largest-ever budgets. It was the first AIP movie to cost over a million dollars.

Vincent Price stated in a 1987 interview with David Del Valle that the original script was a camp musical, but AIP "cut out all of the music! They got scared of it. It could have been terribly funny. I think it would have been almost like Little Shop of Horrors. It was a wonderful, witty script, with wonderful witty music and they cut it all out."

According to Susan Hart:

One of the best scenes I've seen on film was Vincent Price singing about the bikini machine – it was excellent. And I was told it was taken out because Sam Arkoff thought that Vincent Price looked too fey. But his character was fey! By taking that particular scene out, I believe they took the explanation and the meat out of that picture... It was a really unique explanatory scene and Vincent Price was beautiful in it, right on the money.

According to Norman Taurog's biographer:

The original plan had been to follow the AIP formula and have songs integrated throughout the film, but Norman brought in Elwood Ullman to do a rewrite ... and the final script read like a good-natured spoof on the James Bond films with no songs. This apparently disappointed Vincent Price, who had been looking forward to singing.

The film is notable for its scenic photography of San Francisco. The streetcar scene was filmed at the West Portal tunnel. Filming went for over 30 days, taking place on location in San Francisco and on the backlots at the Producers Studio and Metro-Goldwyn-Mayer Studios. The day after the company returned from San Francisco, rioting broke out in Watts in South Los Angeles. On August 30, the unit moved to MGM Studios Lot 2 to shoot on their "New York Street" set for a couple of days before returning to the Producers Studio.

The climactic chase sequence was filmed in the Bay Area. The stuntmen included Carey Loftin, Paul Stader, Troy Melton, Jerry Summers, Ronnie Ron-dell, Bob Harris, Louis Elias, David Sharpe, Harvey Parry, and Bill Hickman.

When designing Goldfoot's lair, Daniel Haller re-used some of his designs from 1961's The Pit and the Pendulum. Stock footage of battleships from another AIP release, Godzilla vs. The Thing appears during the climax.

Susan Hart's hair was done by Jon Peters. She recalled filming "was great fun and I felt really good about what I did in that picture" calling Taurog "probably the sweetest man I've ever met in my entire life".

=== Accident ===
During filming in Los Angeles, the city was gripped by a heatwave. Sometimes temperatures on one of the sound stages reached over 100 °F (38 °C) by mid-afternoon. On the afternoon of August 15, 1965, the company was returning from lunch when one of the electricians, Roy Hicks, passed out from the heat and fell to his death from a catwalk.

=== Theme song ===
The theme song was recorded by the Supremes as a single-sided unreleased promotional single.

== Reception ==
The film had its premiere at the Golden Gate Theatre in San Francisco, where Nicholson had been a manager. The key cast members embarked on a 30-day tour of 18 cities in 13 countries to promote the film.

=== Box office ===
In December 1965 Sam Arkoff said "the bikini beach style has had it. We've had some real bombs lately." Nicholson felt Goldfoot "could be a winner. We could use one."

According to Norman Taurog's biographer, the film "was a moderate success in the United States, but did quite well in Europe, particularly in Italy". Samuel Z. Arkoff called it "a medium success", sufficient to make a sequel. Hart says the film "made quite a bit of money".

Dwayne Hickman claimed "hardly anyone saw this awful movie."

=== Critical response ===
The Los Angeles Times said the film "has enough fresh, amusing gags to make it entertaining... Price is splendid". Variety praised the "good script and performances and excellent direction".

Filmink wrote "I know it’s dumb, and silly, and I’m loathe [sic] to recommend the movie to anyone, but for me, it works... It’s bright and colourful... the casting is perfect."

Hickman complained the movie featured "the worst, overdone drunk scene I've ever played. Even now I shudder when I think how bad I was." He called Goldfoot "a truly terrible picture but Frankie, Vincent and I had such a great time that it somehow made it all worthwhile".

== Sequel ==
AIP Television produced a musical TV special episode promoting Doctor Goldfoot and the Bikini Machine that appeared for one night in temporary place of the ABC scheduled show Shindig! This show, called The Wild Weird World of Dr. Goldfoot, starred Vincent Price, Tommy Kirk and Susan Hart, and featured many songs that may have been cut from the cinema release. Louis M. Heyward and Stanley Ross wrote the 30-minute short comedy musical TV special which aired November 18, 1965 on the ABC network.

In July 1965, a sequel was announced to be made the following year called Dr. Goldfoot for President, to begin filming on May 14, 1966, for a September 14 release.

Eventually, Vincent Price returned for the 1966 sequel, Dr. Goldfoot and the Girl Bombs, directed by Mario Bava, with Frankie Avalon replaced by Fabian.

== See also ==
- List of American films of 1965
