= Ski Party =

1965 film by Alan Rafkin

- Theatrical release poster
- Directed by: Alan Rafkin
- Screenplay by: Robert Kaufman
- Produced by: Gene Corman
- Starring: Frankie Avalon; Dwayne Hickman; Deborah Walley; Yvonne Craig; Robert Q. Lewis; James Brown; The Famous Flames; Lesley Gore; Aron Kincaid; Bobbi Shaw; Patti Chandler; Mary Hughes
- Cinematography: Arthur E. Arling
- Edited by: Morton Tubor
- Music by: Guy Hemric; Jerry Styner; Gary Usher; Ted Wright
- Production company: American International Pictures
- Distributed by: American International Pictures
- Release date: June 30, 1965 (U.S.)
- Running time: 90 minutes
- Country: United States
- Language: English

Ski Party is a 1965 American teen musical comedy film directed by Alan Rafkin and starring Frankie Avalon, Dwayne Hickman, Deborah Walley and Yvonne Craig. It was released by American International Pictures (AIP). Ski Party is considered as a beach party film spin-off, with a change of setting from the beach to the ski slopes – although the final scene places everyone back at the beach.

== Plot ==
Todd Armstrong (Avalon) and Craig Gamble (Hickman) are college undergraduates from California, whose romantic relationships with students Linda Hughes (Walley) and Barbara Norris (Craig) are rocky. Arrogant, handsome, athletic classmate Freddie (Aron Kincaid) has no such problems and chooses not to resist all the women chasing after him. As president of the Ski Club, Freddie organizes a midterm vacation trip to ski country (in Sawtooth National Forest) in Idaho. Although they know nothing about skiing, Todd and Craig follow Linda and Barbara on this bus trip to try to learn "the secret of Freddie's technique".

Once at the rustic ski resort, Todd and Craig pose as frumpy, non-threatening, young English women, Jane and Nora. When not interrupted by a mysterious ice-skating, yodeling polar bear or toying with psychologically imbalanced and lederhosen-clad lodge manager Mr. Pevney (Robert Q. Lewis), they observe the women in their group to learn how they have gone wrong.

To make Linda jealous, Todd attracts the attention of gorgeous, curvy Swedish ski instructor Nita (Bobbi Shaw) when he's dressed as himself. However, Freddie becomes obsessed with Craig when Craig is dressed as a woman, not accustomed to women who play "hard to get". Nita persuades Todd, over Freddie's goading, to compete in a ski jump against Freddie. Todd's jump forces Craig to shoot him down, resulting in a broken leg.

Todd crawls through miles of deep snow late at night with his broken leg covered in a plaster cast, to Nita's house. Toting a bottle, he learns that Nita is not the exotic minx she pretends to be, but aspires to be treated like an "American girl", that is, with much "talk" and little "action".

Back at the lodge, Freddie, still obsessed with Craig's "female" Nora, tries to break down Nora's room door. Stuck inside, Todd and Craig contemplate their next move as they escape through a window. Somehow, they hail a taxi and rack up an enormous fare to Santa Monica, California. Freddie follows on a moped that is piloted by fur-coated lodge manager Pevney. The rest of the group abruptly ends its spring break and follows behind on the bus.

Todd, Linda, Craig, and Barbara arrive, with the rest of the group and Pevney, at Todd's parents' beachfront house. There, the two couples share their true feelings, and the boys surprise the women with their ruse.

Delusional Freddie runs into the Pacific Ocean, calling to his beloved Nora, after Craig tells him that when she heard Freddie was coming, she started swimming: By now, she is "somewhere between here and Japan." Craig encourages Freddie to hurry; maybe he can catch her "somewhere near Guam".

"Pretty mean thing to do," Craig says to the audience, reassuring us that they will tell Freddie everything tomorrow. "If he comes back..."

== Cast ==
- Frankie Avalon as Todd Armstrong
- Dwayne Hickman as Craig Gamble
- Deborah Walley as Linda Hughes
- Yvonne Craig as Barbara Norris
- Robert Q. Lewis as Mr. Pevney
- Bobbi Shaw as Nita Elksberg
- Aron Kincaid as Freddie Carter
- The Hondells as themselves
- Steven Rogers as Gene
- Patti Chandler as Janet
- Michael Nader as Bobby
- Salli Sachse as Indian
- John Boyer as John
- Mikki Jamison as Mikki
- Mickey Dora as Mickey
- Mary Hughes as Mary
- Bill Sampson as Arthur
- Luree Holmes as Luree
- Lesley Gore as herself
- James Brown & The Famous Flames (Bobby Byrd, Bobby Bennett, and Lloyd Stallworth) as themselves

Cast notes

- Annette Funicello contributes an opening cameo as the boys' desirable but modestly dressed Professor Sonya Roberts.
- Avalon and Hickman appeared together again – after trading their character names with each other – in AIP's Dr. Goldfoot and the Bikini Machine.
- Meredith MacRae appeared (uncredited) as the girl on the bus behind Lesley Gore.

== Production ==
In December 1964, AIP announced the film would follow Beach Blanket Bingo, then be followed by How to Stuff a Wild Bikini. James H. Nicholson and Sam Arkoff hired Gene Corman to produce after watching The Girls on the Beach. Corman hired the director, Alan Rafkin, and writer, Robert Kaufman, from television. Publicity called it the sixth in the series.

Dwayne Hickman made the film immediately after Cat Ballou and for the same salary. He later wrote "it may have seemed like a strange career decision to go from a classic comedy Western like Cat Ballou to an AIP date movie like Ski Party but at the time Cat was really just a B movie for Columbia." It was one of several films Deborah Walley made for AIP.

Hickman says he "hit it off immediately" with co star Avalon "and decided that we should play the characters like Hope and Crosby. Frankie would be the Crosby-like character, smart, in-charge and slick, while I would play the Hope role and be the bumbler. We added a lot of physical business which helped a not very imaginative script."

AIP wanted John Ashley to play Freddy, but Corman felt he looked too much like Avalon. The producer instead cast Aron Kincaid, who had been in Corman's previous two beach films.

Los Angeles City College (a two-year institution in East Hollywood) was the location used for the unnamed university in the film. The outdoor snow scenes were filmed in and around Sun Valley, Idaho over three weeks, and the film gives screen credit to Idaho's Sawtooth National Forest. Ski instructor Siegfried Engl has a cameo. There were also some scenes shot at the beach.

In March 1965, one week into filming, AIP were so happy with the rushes that they announced Kaufman, Corman and Rafkin would make Cruise Party immediately. Cruise Party was announced at the end of the credits for Ski Party but it was never was produced.

James Brown said he "felt like [he] was in a straitjacket" during his appearance.

Hickman said making the film "was a totally enjoyable experience", and AIP offered him a lead role in How to Stuff a Wild Bikini. The studio reunited him and Avalon in Dr Goldfoot and the Bikini Machine with Hickman's playing Armstrong and Avalon's playing Gamble.

== Music ==
Ski Party is punctuated with musical numbers by Lesley Gore, who sings Marvin Hamlisch's "Sunshine, Lollipops, and Rainbows" on the bus, and James Brown & The Famous Flames (Bobby Byrd, Lloyd Stallworth, and Bobby Bennett) who sing and shimmy through "I Got You (I Feel Good)" in the lodge, having been humorously cast as the "white bread" resort's all-black ski patrol. (In the bio-pic Get On Up, the scene from Ski Party is re-created, with Brown's bemoaning that he is splitting his pants "in front of all these white folks".)

The Hondells sing two songs written by Gary Usher and Roger Christian – the title track, off-camera, then appearing in beach attire for the closing track, "The Gasser", on Sorrento Beach in Santa Monica].

Avalon sings the surf-rock "Lots, Lots More" (by Richie Adams and Larry Kusik), and is joined by Hickman, Walley and Craig for the Holiday-styled "Paintin' the Town" (written by Bob Gaudio of The Four Seasons).

Walley and Craig sing "We'll Never Change Them", a song by Guy Hemric and Jerry Styner, originally written as "I'll Never Change Him" and sung by Annette Funicello in a scene cut from Beach Blanket Bingo.

This is the only AIP beach party film not scored by Les Baxter. Edwin Norton is credited as the film's music editor and Al Simms as music supervisor.

== Reception ==
=== Critical ===
The Los Angeles Times wrote the dialogue "seems awfully childish even for teenagers", but liked the musical acts.

Variety called it "an entertaining teenage comedy romance in snowcountry settings, with excellent direction of good satirical script ad fine performances by young thesps. Gene Corman production values are standout and seven tunes enliven pace."

Filmink wrote "There's lots of fun in Ski Party, as well as the inevitable dodginess from a 1965 Hollywood movie about the differences between men and women."

=== Box office ===
Samuel Arkoff of AIP stated the film was a commercial disappointment. A follow-up film announced in the credits, Cruise Party, never was made. In December 1965 Sam Arkoff said "the bikini beach style has had it. We've had some real bombs lately."

Both Columbia Pictures and Universal Studios produced their versions of snowbound beach party films: Columbia's Winter a Go-Go was released four months later in October 1965, and Universal's Wild Wild Winter was released in January 1966.

== Merchandising ==
Dell Comics published a 12-cent comic book version of Ski Party in conjunction with the movie's release.

== Home media ==
Ski Party was released to DVD by MGM Home Video on April 15, 2003 as part of a double-sided disc, with Ski Party on side two of the disc and on July 10, 2007 as part of the box set The Frankie and Annette Collection, with Ski Party on the fourth disc.

== See also ==
- List of American films of 1965

== Bibliography ==
- Hickman, Dwayne; Roberts, Joan (1994). Forever Dobie: The Many Lives of Dwayne Hickman. Carol Pub. Group. ISBN 9781559722520.
- Lisanti, Tom (2005). Hollywood Surf and Beach Movies: The First Wave, 1959-1969. McFarland & Co. ISBN 9780786421046.
