= Fred R. Feitshans Jr. =

American film editor (1909–1987)

- Born: Frederic Feitshans Jr. September 10, 1909; Los Angeles, California, U.S.
- Died: December 21, 1987 (aged 78); Studio City, California, U.S.
- Occupation: Film editor
- Children: Buzz Feitshans

Frederic Feitshans Jr. (September 10, 1909 – December 21, 1987) was an American film editor. He was nominated for an Academy Award in the category Best Film Editing for the film Wild in the Streets.

Feitshans died on December 21, 1987 in Studio City, California, at the age of 78. He was buried at Forest Lawn Memorial Park.

== Selected filmography ==
- Wild in the Streets (1968; co-nominated with Eve Newman)
