= Sergeant Deadhead =

1965 film by Norman Taurog

- Directed by: Norman Taurog
- Written by: Louis M. Heyward
- Produced by: James H. Nicholson; Samuel Z. Arkoff
- Starring: Frankie Avalon; Deborah Walley; Cesar Romero; Fred Clark; Gale Gordon; Reginald Gardiner; Harvey Lembeck; Donna Loren; John Ashley; Pat Buttram; Buster Keaton; Eve Arden
- Cinematography: Floyd Crosby
- Edited by: Ronald Sinclair; Fred R. Feitshans Jr. Eve Newman
- Music by: Les Baxter
- Production company: Alta Vista Productions
- Distributed by: American International Pictures
- Release date: August 18, 1965
- Running time: 90 mins
- Country: United States
- Language: English
- Budget: $150,000

Sergeant Deadhead is a 1965 American musical comedy film directed by Norman Taurog and starring Frankie Avalon. It features many cast members who appeared in the Beach Party movies.

== Plot ==
Sergeant Deadhead is a bumbling soldier who is sent to the guardhouse for blowing up a model rocket on the parade ground of the air base where he is stationed. His fiancée, Airman Lucy Turner despairs of ever marrying him because of him being constantly disciplined for his antics. She is worried that she will have to marry him while he is in the guardhouse.

Together with Private McEvoy, Sergeant Deadhead escapes from the guardhouse. Private McEvoy decides to break back in, but Sergeant Deadhead hides in a nearby space rocket, not knowing it is set to blast off with a chimpanzee aboard. He falls asleep in the rocket's control room and is accidentally blasted into space, together with the chimpanzee.

When Sergeant Deadhead is discovered to be aboard the rocket, General Fogg decides to spin the facts and say that Sergeant Deadhead volunteered for the mission. He and Navy Captain Weiskopf also decide that Sergeant Deadhead and Airman Turner will have a well publicized wedding on the air base when Sergeant Deadhead returns to earth.

When Sergeant Deadhead returns home he is a national hero but has also developed a massive ego due to space travel causing his personality to blend with that of the chimpanzee, and the realization that he has become a media sensation.

A soldier who looks exactly like him, Sergeant Donovan, is found to take his place. When the smooth talking Sergeant Donovan is set to take Sergeant Deadhead's place at the altar, Sergeant Deadhead breaks out of the guardhouse, starts to recover his personality, and switches places with Sergeant Donovan. When the leadership realizes he has escaped the guardhouse, he runs away.

Sergeant Deadhead finds out about Sergeant Donovan, and goes to the hotel where the wedding reception and honeymoon are taking place. There he switches places with Sergeant Donovan to enjoy his honeymoon. However, General Fogg and the others find Donovan and take him back to the honeymoon suite, looking for Deadhead. Thinking Donovan is Deadhead, Airman Turner chases them out.

When Airman Turner is preparing a bath for Donovan, Deadhead sneaks in the window and coldcocks Donovan with a vase, knocking him out. Fogg, Weiskopf and the others show up again at the door, claiming to have a message from the President. Thinking that Deadhead is Donovan, Fogg and Weiskopf have two MP's escort Deadhead and Turner to the airport to fly to see the President. Donovan awakes alone in the closet, then goes back to base where Fogg and Weiskopf discover that Deadhead is with Turner and going to meet the President. Deadhead and Turner enjoy the rest of their honeymoon and their meeting with the President.

Two marines appear to arrest Deadhead but mistakenly arrest the President, who is trying on Deadhead's space helmet. Deadhead and Turner escape in a White House helicopter. Fogg, Weiskopf and the others end up in the guardhouse.

== Cast ==
- Frankie Avalon as Sgt. O. K. Deadhead/Sergeant Donovan
- Deborah Walley as Airman Lucy Turner
- Cesar Romero as Admiral Stoneham
- Fred Clark as Gen. Rufus Fogg
- Gale Gordon as Captain Weiskopf
- Harvey Lembeck as Private McEvoy
- John Ashley as Private Filroy
- Buster Keaton as Private Blinken
- Reginald Gardiner as Lieutenant Commander Talbott
- Eve Arden as Lieutenant Kinsey
- Pat Buttram as The President
- Donna Loren as Susan

Numerous other Beach Party regulars also appear in small roles throughout the film; Dwayne Hickman, Alberta Nelson, Michael Nader, Luree Holmes, Patti Chandler, Andy Romano and Bobbi Shaw.

== Production ==
The film was the first in a two-picture deal AIP signed with Norman Taurog in 1964.

On 10 March 1965 it was announced that Tommy Kirk would star. However Frankie Avalon ended up taking the role instead. While making the film AIP would exercise its option on Avalon's services to make two films a year for them over four years. The movie was one of several Deborah Walley made for AIP.

Filming began in May 1965, following completion of How to Stuff a Wild Bikini. Location work took place at the San Fernando Valley.

The script by Deke Heyward would not write in gags for Buster Keaton. It would simply say "Buster does a bit here" and Keaton would come up with something on his own and show it to the director.

Before the film came out, plans for a sequel (never actually produced) were announced – Sergeant Deadhead Goes to Mars, meant to start 13 April 1966.

== Reception ==
=== Box office ===
AIP made the film hoping that military comedies would provide them with a genre as popular as the beach party movies but it proved a commercial disappointment, Samuel Z Arkoff claiming it "bombed out".

Norman Taurog's biographer claimed the film managed to recoup its costs and make a small profit for the studio.

=== Critical ===
Diabolique magazine said the movie was the only one in the AIP beach cycle where John Ashley did not play it straight; here he "put on glasses and plays a geeky soldier; it’s disconcerting – it feels as though the role was originally written for Jody McCrea – and helps sink what is already a poor movie."

Variety called it "entertaining" with "a script that touches all bases."

Filmink argued "the mix" of AIP and service comedies "didn't work."

== Songs ==
All the songs in the film were written by Guy Hemric and Jerry Styner:

- "Hurry Up and Wait" – sung by female cast over the opening credits
- "How Can You Tell" – sung by Deborah Walley, Donna Loren and Bobbi Shaw
- "You Should've Seen the One That Got Away" – sung by Eve Arden
- "Two Timin' Angel" – sung by Donna Loren
- "Let's Play Love" – sung by Deborah Walley and Frankie Avalon
- "Let's Play Love (Reprise)" – sung by Deborah Walley and Frankie Avalon
- "The Difference in Me Is You" – sung by Frankie Avalon

Score by Les Baxter.
