= How to Stuff a Wild Bikini =

1965 film by William Asher

- Directed by: William Asher
- Written by: William Asher; Leo Townsend
- Produced by: Samuel Z. Arkoff; James H. Nicholson
- Starring: Annette Funicello; Dwayne Hickman; Brian Donlevy; Buster Keaton; Beverly Adams; Harvey Lembeck; John Ashley; Jody McCrea; Mickey Rooney
- Cinematography: Floyd D. Crosby
- Edited by: Eve Newman
- Music by: Les Baxter
- Production company: American International Pictures
- Distributed by: American International Pictures
- Release date: July 14, 1965
- Running time: 90 minutes
- Country: United States
- Language: English
- Budget: $150,000

How to Stuff a Wild Bikini is a 1965 Pathécolor beach party film from American International Pictures. The sixth entry in a seven-film series, the movie was directed by William Asher and features Mickey Rooney, Annette Funicello, Dwayne Hickman, Brian Donlevy, and Beverly Adams. It was written by Asher and Leo Townsend. The film features a brief appearance by Frankie Avalon and includes Buster Keaton in one of his last roles.

== Plot ==
Frankie goes to Tahiti on naval reserve duty. While cavorting with local girls, Frankie realizes that Dee Dee might be unfaithful to him. When Frankie seeks help from a witch doctor, the witch doctor sends a sea beauty, Cassandra, to lure Ricky, an advertising executive, away from Dee Dee.

Upon Cassandra's arrival, the beach turns upside down, as all the surfers fall for her, an executive wants to make her a model, and Eric Von Zipper and his motorcycle gang add to the trouble.

== Cast ==
- Annette Funicello as Dee Dee
- Dwayne Hickman as Ricky
- Brian Donlevy as B. D. (Big Deal) McPherson
- Harvey Lembeck as Eric Von Zipper
- Beverly Adams as Cassandra
- John Ashley as Johnny
- Jody McCrea as Bonehead
- Marianne Gaba as Animal
- Len Lesser as North Dakota Pete
- Irene Tsu as Native Girl
- Arthur Julian as Dr. Melamed
- Bobbi Shaw as Khola Koku
- Buster Keaton as Bwana
- The Kingsmen as themselves
- Alberta Nelson as Puss
- Andy Romano as J. D.
- Patti Chandler as Patti
- Michael Nader as Mike (as Mike Nader)
- Sheila MacRae as Secretary (as Sheila Stephenson)
- Mickey Rooney as Peachy (J. Peachmont) Keane
- Frankie Avalon as Frankie
- Michele Carey as Michele
- Mary Hughes as Beach Girl
- Linda Bent as Bookend #1
- Salli Sachse as Bookend #2
- Elizabeth Montgomery as Bwana's daughter, the Witches' Witch (uncredited)

== Production ==
How to Stuff a Wild Bikini was the last "beach party" film to feature Frankie Avalon and Annette Funicello. Avalon appeared on-screen for about six minutes and interacted only very briefly with Funicello. His small role was attributed to the fact that he was filming another AIP production, 1965's Sergeant Deadhead.

Dwayne Hickman played the male lead, a man trying to woo Funicello's character away from her absent boyfriend. Tommy Kirk was originally announced as the male lead, but shortly before filming, he was arrested for possession of marijuana, so he was dropped and replaced by Hickman. Mickey Rooney agreed to play a supporting role at $5,000 for one week's work to pay off some tax debts.

Filming started April 12, 1965, and took 15 days. It was the only film in the series where John Ashley sang lead male vocals.

Funicello was pregnant during shooting and was shot mostly wearing blousy tunics or with a prop in front of her (e.g., a bowl of popcorn, a bucket of Kentucky Fried Chicken). She wrote in her memoirs that her pregnancy and Avalon's absence made this one of her least-favorite beach-party movies. The film featured the only big-screen appearance by The Kingsmen, who performed "Give Her Lovin'".

Len Lesser was cast as North Dakota Pete. He recalled, "I just threw caution to the wind with the role. I went crazy — kind of like I was acting in high school. It wasn’t serious stuff and Bill [Asher] insisted we have fun with it. Mickey Rooney and the great Buster Keaton were also in the movie, which was an added bonus. All of us had a blast, sitting on the beach, watching pretty girls in bikinis — singing and dancing. And we got paid very well."

Elizabeth Montgomery, who at the time was married to the film's director, William Asher, made a cameo appearance in the closing scenes as the witch doctor's daughter, a woman with her own magical powers. Montgomery was instantly recognizable during this period as the star of the hit TV sitcom Bewitched, also directed by Asher, so this small film role was a parody of her TV role.

The opening credits were done using clay animation done by Art Clokey, the creator of Gumby.

== Reception ==
Variety called it a "lightweight affair lacking the breeziness and substance of earlier entries."

The critic from the Los Angeles Times called the movie a "breezy number". The New York Times said it was "the answer to a moron's prayer." Filmink argued the movie " has become legendary in its way, mostly due to its title, some hilariously obvious KFC product placement, and the fact that Annette Funicello is so clearly pregnant."

In December 1965, Sam Arkoff said, "the bikini beach style has had it. We've had some real bombs lately."

== Soundtrack ==
How To Stuff A Wild Bikini

Soundtrack album
- Released: 14 July 1965
- Recorded: 1965
- Genre: Beach party
- Length: 23:58
- Label: Wand 671
- Producer: American International

Professional ratings
Review scores
Source	Rating
AllMusic	2.5/5 stars

How To Stuff A Wild Bikini, the soundtrack for the film, was released in 1965. Most of the songs are performed by various cast members, with two numbers by The Kingsmen. The album was released in both mono (WDM 671) and stereo (WDS 671) versions, with the latter being very scarce. The stereo release was reissued on CD by Real Gone Music in July 2014.

=== Track listing ===
All songs written by Guy Hemric and Jerry Styner except "Give Her Lovin'" by Lynn Easton. Songs are in slightly different order from the movie.

No.	Title	Performer	Length
1.	"How To Stuff A Wild Bikini"	Cast	2:04
2.	"That's What I Call A Healthy Girl"	Cast	1:56
3.	"If It's Gonna Happen"	Lou Ann Simms	2:00
4.	"How About Us"	Mickey Rooney & Girls	2:00
5.	"The Boy Next Door"	Harvey Lembeck & Cast	1:55
6.	"After The Party"	Cast	2:12
7.	"Better Be Ready"	Annette Funicello	1:55
8.	"Follow Your Leader"	Harvey Lembeck & Cast	1:34
9.	"The Perfect Boy"	Annette & Girls	2:30
10.	"Madison Avenue"	Mickey Rooney & Brian Donlevy	2:15
11.	"Give Her Lovin' "	The Kingsmen	1:44
12.	"How To Stuff A Wild Bikini"	The Kingsmen	1:53

=== Production credits ===
- Producer: American International
- Publisher: DiJon Music
- Liner notes: Joe Bogart and Frank Costa (WMCA Music Department)

== Home media ==
In 2001, How to Stuff a Wild Bikini was released by MGM on Region 1 DVD. Since its initial DVD release, the film has been included in two box sets, Frankie & Annette MGM Movie Legends Collection and Midnite Movies Double Feature, along with selected Beach Party films.

Olive Films released a Blu-Ray of How to Stuff a Wild Bikini on June 25, 2019.

== See also ==
- List of American films of 1965
