= James H. Nicholson =

American film producer

- Born: James Hartford Nicholson; September 14, 1916; Seattle, Washington, U.S.
- Died: December 10, 1972 (aged 56); Los Angeles, California, U.S.
- Resting place: Inglewood Park Cemetery
- Occupation: Film producer
- Years active: 1954–1972
- Known for: Co-founder of American International Pictures
- Spouses: Sylvia Svoboda (m. 1940; div. 1964) Susan Hart (m. 1964)
- Children: 4
- Relatives: Richard Harrison (son-in-law); Jill Messick (granddaughter)

James Hartford Nicholson (September 14, 1916 – December 10, 1972) was an American film producer. He is best known as the co-founder, with Samuel Z. Arkoff, of American International Pictures.

== Early life ==
Nicholson was born on September 14, 1916, in Seattle, Washington. As a child, he developed a love of movies, especially fantasy and science fiction films. While at San Francisco Polytechnic High School, he joined a science fiction fan club, where he met Forrest J Ackerman. The two produced a fantasy fanzine together. Years later, Ackerman's magazine Famous Monsters of Filmland would heavily promote AIP's films.

== Career ==
Nicholson's first work in the film industry was as an usher at the El Rey Theatre in San Francisco when he was 16. He became a projectionist the following year and two years later bought his first theater. He was the manager of two theaters in Omaha, Nebraska. The chain that owned the theaters soon went out business and Nicholson found himself unemployed. He drifted through a series of short-lived jobs, and ended up running four revival movie theaters in Los Angeles with Joseph Moritz in 1944. He introduced new ways of attracting customers, including showing the 1949 Rose Bowl. Nicholson was eventually hired by Jack Broder at Realart Pictures in their advertising department; his job was to devise new campaigns for the old movies that Realart re-released, which often included retitling the films. A threat of a lawsuit from Alex Gordon, regarding a title similarity between one of Realart's reissues and a screenplay Gordon had written with Ed Wood with exactly the same title, led to Nicholson meeting Samuel Z. Arkoff, who was at that time Gordon's lawyer. Nicholson and Arkoff became friends and eventually decided to form American Releasing Corporation, a film distribution company, in 1954, in association with Moritz. Two years later they founded American International Pictures to make independent films for their circuit, with Nicholson as president.

Nicholson was known as the creative member of the partnership. His movie sense, combined with Arkoff's business savvy, led to AIP's long string of successful films aimed squarely at teenaged audiences. From 1954 to 1980, AIP released over 125 films, most of them released directly to drive-ins and grindhouses. Nicholson would often think up an exploitable title, and devise an entire advertising campaign complete with poster art, even before a script had been drafted. The films were mostly completed on low budgets, with shooting done in two or three weeks (and sometimes only a few days) on rented stages at the Chaplin Studio, and nearly all of them turned profits.

Nicholson and Arkoff were named Producers of the Year in 1963 by the Allied States Association of Motion Picture Owners and in 1964 were named by the Theatre Owners of America as Master Showmen of the Decade.

== Independent producer ==
In 1972, Nicholson left AIP to make independent productions under his Academy Pictures Corp. with a distribution deal with AIP however, he later severed ties with AIP by signing a distribution deal with 20th Century Fox. According to his then-wife, Susan Hart, he was going to make five films:

- The Legend of Hell House
- Black Father
- Street People
- The B People
- Dirty Mary, Crazy Larry

Nicholson's death meant only the first and last of these were made.

== Personal life ==
Nicholson was married twice. He had three daughters (Luree Holmes, Laura Nicholson, Loretta Nicholson) with his first wife, Sylvia, and a son, Jimmy, with actress Susan Hart. His granddaughter from Laura was film producer Jill Messick.

== Death ==
Nicholson was diagnosed with a brain tumor during 1972 and received cobalt therapy but relapsed and died in the aftermath of surgery aged 56. He is buried in Inglewood Park Cemetery. AIP continued for several more years before Arkoff, having lost interest in the movie business, allowed himself to be bought out by Filmways for $4.3 million.

== Filmography ==
- Wuthering Heights (1970)
