= List of American films of 1965 =

More than 210 American films were released in 1965.

The Sound of Music won the Academy Award for Best Picture.

== A–D ==
Title	Director	Cast	Genre	Note
36 Hours	George Seaton	James Garner, Rod Taylor, Eva Marie Saint	War drama	MGM
The Agony and the Ecstasy	Carol Reed	Rex Harrison, Charlton Heston, Diane Cilento	Drama, biography	Fox
Andy	Richard C. Sarafian	Norman Alden, Ann Wedgeworth, Zvee Scooler	Drama	Universal
Apache Uprising	R. G. Springsteen	Rory Calhoun, Corinne Calvet, John Russell	Western	Paramount
Arizona Raiders	William Witney	Audie Murphy, Michael Dante, Gloria Talbott	Western	Columbia
The Art of Love	Norman Jewison	Dick Van Dyke, James Garner, Elke Sommer, Angie Dickinson	Comedy	Universal
Baby the Rain Must Fall	Robert Mulligan	Steve McQueen, Lee Remick, Don Murray	Drama	Columbia
Bad Girls Do Cry	Sid Melton	Misty Ayers, William Page, William Marks	Sexploitation	Independent. Filmed in 1954.
Bad Girls Go to Hell	Doris Wishman	Gigi Darlene, George La Rocque	Sexploitation	Independent
Battle of the Bulge	Ken Annakin	Henry Fonda, Dana Andrews, Robert Shaw, Robert Ryan, Ty Hardin, Pier Angeli, Telly Savalas, Charles Bronson	War drama	Warner Bros.
Beach Ball	Lennie Weinrib	Edd Byrnes, Chris Noel, Gail Gilmore	Comedy	Paramount
Beach Blanket Bingo	William Asher	Frankie Avalon, Annette Funicello, Paul Lynde, Don Rickles	Comedy, Musical	A.I.P.
The Bedford Incident	James B. Harris	Richard Widmark, Sidney Poitier, Martin Balsam, Wally Cox	Drama	Columbia
Billie	Don Weis	Patty Duke, Jim Backus, Jane Greer	Musical	United Artists
Black Spurs	R. G. Springsteen	Rory Calhoun, Terry Moore, Linda Darnell	Western	Paramount
Bloody Pit of Horror	Massimo Pupillo	Mickey Hargitay, Walter Bigari, Luisa Baratto	Horror	Italian-American co-production
Boeing Boeing	John Rich	Tony Curtis, Jerry Lewis, Dany Saval	Comedy	Paramount
The Bounty Killer	Spencer Gordon Bennet	Dan Duryea, Audrey Dalton, Richard Arlen	Western	Embassy Pictures
Brainstorm	William Conrad	Anne Francis, Dana Andrews, Jeffrey Hunter	Suspense	Warner Bros.
Bus Riley's Back in Town	Harvey Hart	Ann-Margret, Michael Parks, Kim Darby, Janet Margolin	Drama	Universal
Cat Ballou	Elliot Silverstein	Jane Fonda, Lee Marvin, Dwayne Hickman, Michael Callan, Nat King Cole, Stubby Kaye	Western comedy	Columbia. Academy Award for Marvin
The Cincinnati Kid	Norman Jewison	Steve McQueen, Ann-Margret, Edward G. Robinson, Karl Malden, Tuesday Weld, Rip Torn, Cab Calloway, Joan Blondell	Drama	MGM
City Under the Sea	Jacques Tourneur	Vincent Price, Tab Hunter, Susan Hart	Sci-fi	A.I.P. Tourneur's final film
Clarence, the Cross-Eyed Lion	Andrew Marton	Marshall Thompson, Betsy Drake, Richard Haydn	Family	MGM. Inspired TV's Daktari
The Collector	William Wyler	Terence Stamp, Samantha Eggar, Mona Washbourne	Thriller	Columbia
Convict Stage	Lesley Selander	Harry Lauter, Don "Red" Barry, Hanna Landy	Western	20th Century Fox
Crack in the World	Andrew Marton	Dana Andrews, Janette Scott, Kieron Moore	Drama	Paramount
Dark Intruder	Harvey Hart	Leslie Nielsen, Mark Richman, Judi Meredith	Horror	Universal
Deadwood '76	James Landis	Arch Hall Sr.	Western	Fairway International Pictures
Dear Brigitte	Henry Koster	James Stewart, Fabian, Glynis Johns, Ed Wynn, Bill Mumy, Brigitte Bardot	Comedy	Fox
Die, Monster, Die!	Daniel Haller	Boris Karloff, Nick Adams, Suzan Farmer	Science Fiction, Horror	A.I.P.
The Dirty Game	Christian-Jaque, Werner Klingler, Carlo Lizzani, Terence Young	Henry Fonda, Robert Ryan, Vittorio Gassman	Spy anthology	A.I.P
Do Not Disturb	Ralph Levy	Doris Day, Rod Taylor, Hermione Baddeley	Comedy	20th Century Fox
Doctor Zhivago	David Lean	Omar Sharif, Julie Christie, Rod Steiger, Geraldine Chaplin, Tom Courtenay, Alec Guinness	Drama, epic	MGM. Based on the novel; 5 Oscars
Dr. Goldfoot and the Bikini Machine	Norman Taurog	Vincent Price, Frankie Avalon, Dwayne Hickman, Susan Hart	Comedy	A.I.P.

== E–I ==
Title	Director	Cast	Genre	Note
The Family Jewels	Jerry Lewis	Jerry Lewis, Sebastian Cabot, Donna Butterworth	Comedy	Paramount
Faster, Pussycat! Kill! Kill!	Russ Meyer	Tura Satana, Haji, Lori Williams	Sexploitation	Independent
Finger on the Trigger	Sidney W. Pink	Rory Calhoun, Aldo Sambrell, James Philbrook	Western	Allied Artists
The Flight of the Phoenix	Robert Aldrich	James Stewart, Peter Finch, Richard Attenborough, Hardy Kruger, Dan Duryea, George Kennedy, Ernest Borgnine	Drama	20th Century Fox. From Elleston Trevor novel; 2 Oscar nominations
Fluffy	Earl Bellamy	Tony Randall, Shirley Jones, Celia Kaye	Family	Universal
The Fool Killer	Servando González	Anthony Perkins, Edward Albert, Dana Elcar	Adventure	Allied Artists
Fort Courageous	Lesley Selander	Don "Red" Barry, Hanna Landy, Harry Lauter	Western	20th Century Fox
Frankenstein Meets the Spacemonster	Robert Gaffney	James Karen, Marilyn Hanold	Science fiction	Allied Artists
Genghis Khan	Henry Levin	Omar Sharif, James Mason, Eli Wallach	Adventure	Columbia
Girl Happy	Boris Sagal	Elvis Presley, Shelley Fabares, Harold Stone, John Fiedler, Nita Talbot, Mary Ann Mobley, Gary Crosby	Musical	MGM
The Girls on the Beach	William N. Witney	Noreen Corcoran, Martin West, Linda Marshall	Comedy	Paramount
Git!	Ellis Kadison	Heather North, Leslie Bradley, Richard Webb	Drama	Embassy Pictures
The Glory Guys	Arnold Laven	Tom Tryon, Harve Presnell, Senta Berger, James Caan	Western	United Artists
Goldstein	Philip Kaufman	Lou Gilbert, Ellen Madison, Tom Erhart	Comedy	
The Great Race	Blake Edwards	Tony Curtis, Natalie Wood, Jack Lemmon, Peter Falk	Comedy	Warner Bros.; 5 Oscar nominations
The Great Sioux Massacre	Sidney Salkow	Joseph Cotten, Darren McGavin, Philip Carey	Western	Columbia
The Greatest Story Ever Told	George Stevens	Max von Sydow, Charlton Heston, José Ferrer, Claude Rains, Angela Lansbury, David McCallum, Martin Landau, Ed Wynn, Telly Savalas, Sidney Poitier, John Wayne	Biblical epic	United Artists; 5 Oscar nominations; Rains' final film
Guns of Diablo	Boris Sagal	Charles Bronson, Kurt Russell	Western	MGM
The Hallelujah Trail	John Sturges	Burt Lancaster, Lee Remick, Jim Hutton, Pamela Tiffin	Western comedy	United Artists
Harlow	Gordon Douglas	Carroll Baker, Raf Vallone, Angela Lansbury, Peter Lawford	Drama, biography	Paramount Pictures; story of Jean Harlow
Harlow	Alex Segal	Carol Lynley, Efrem Zimbalist, Jr., Ginger Rogers	Biography	Independent. Rogers' final film
Harum Scarum	Gene Nelson	Elvis Presley, Mary Ann Mobley, Fran Jeffries	Musical	MGM
Having a Wild Weekend	John Boorman	The Dave Clark Five	Musical	Boorman's first film
Harvey Middleman, Fireman	Ernest Pintoff	Patricia Harty, Arlene Golonka, Hermione Gingold	Comedy	Columbia
How to Murder Your Wife	Richard Quine	Jack Lemmon, Terry-Thomas, Virna Lisi	Comedy	United Artists
How to Stuff a Wild Bikini	William Asher	Annette Funicello, Dwayne Hickman, Beverly Adams	Comedy	A.I.P.
The Human Duplicators	Hugo Grimaldi	George Nader, Barbara Nichols, Dolores Faith	Sci-fi	Independent
I Saw What You Did	William Castle	Joan Crawford, John Ireland	Thriller	Universal
I'll Take Sweden	Frederick de Cordova	Bob Hope, Tuesday Weld, Frankie Avalon	Comedy	United Artists
In Harm's Way	Otto Preminger	John Wayne, Kirk Douglas, Patricia Neal, Henry Fonda, Brandon deWilde, Paula Prentiss, Burgess Meredith, Carroll O'Connor, Tom Tryon, Dana Andrews, George Kennedy	War drama	Paramount; from James Bassett novel; BAFTA award for Neal
Indian Paint	Norman Foster	Johnny Crawford, Jay Silverheels, Pat Hogan	Western	Crown
Inside Daisy Clover	Robert Mulligan	Natalie Wood, Robert Redford, Christopher Plummer	Drama	Warner Bros. 4 Oscar nominations

== J–R ==
Title	Director	Cast	Genre	Note
John Goldfarb, Please Come Home	J. Lee Thompson	Shirley MacLaine, Richard Crenna, Peter Ustinov	Comedy	20th Century Fox
Joy in the Morning	Alex Segal	Richard Chamberlain, Yvette Mimieux, Oskar Homolka	Drama	MGM
King Rat	Bryan Forbes	George Segal, Tom Courtenay, James Fox	War drama	Columbia. From James Clavell novel
Love and Kisses	Ozzie Nelson	Ricky Nelson, Jerry Van Dyke, Kris Harmon	Comedy	Universal
Love Has Many Faces	Alexander Singer	Lana Turner, Cliff Robertson, Hugh O'Brian, Ruth Roman, Stefanie Powers	Drama, Romance	Columbia
The Loved One	Tony Richardson	Robert Morse, Jonathan Winters, John Gielgud, Liberace, Milton Berle, Tab Hunter, Rod Steiger	Comedy	MGM; based on novel by Evelyn Waugh
Major Dundee	Sam Peckinpah	Charlton Heston, Richard Harris, James Coburn	Western	Columbia
The Man from Button Willow	David Detiege	Dale Robertson, Howard Keel, Barbara Jean Wong	Animated western	Independent
Mara of the Wilderness	Frank McDonald	Adam West, Lori Saunders	Adventure	Allied Artists
Marriage on the Rocks	Jack Donohue	Frank Sinatra, Dean Martin, Deborah Kerr	Romantic comedy	Warner Bros.
McHale's Navy Joins the Air Force	Edward Montagne	Joe Flynn, Tim Conway	Comedy	Universal Pictures
Mickey One	Arthur Penn	Warren Beatty, Franchot Tone, Alexandra Stewart	Drama	Columbia
Mirage	Edward Dmytryk	Gregory Peck, Diane Baker, Walter Matthau	Thriller	Universal Pictures
Mister Moses	Ronald Neame	Robert Mitchum, Carroll Baker, Ian Bannen	Adventure	United Artists
The Monkey's Uncle	Robert Stevenson	Annette Funicello, Tommy Kirk, Arthur O'Connell	Comedy	Disney; sequel to 1964 film
The Money Trap	Burt Kennedy	Glenn Ford, Elke Sommer, Rita Hayworth	Drama	MGM
Monster A Go-Go	Bill Rebane	June Travis, Phil Morton	Science fiction	
Morituri	Bernhard Wicki	Marlon Brando, Yul Brynner, Wally Cox, Janet Margolin	Action	20th Century Fox
Motorpsycho	Russ Meyer	Haji, Alex Rocco	Action	Independent
Mudhoney	Russ Meyer	Lorna Maitland, Hal Hopper	Drama	Independent
My Blood Runs Cold	William Conrad	Troy Donahue, Joey Heatherton, Barry Sullivan	Thriller	Warner Bros.
The Naked Brigade	Maury Dexter	Shirley Eaton, Ken Scott, Mary Chronopoulou	War	Universal
The Naked Prey	Cornel Wilde	Cornel Wilde, Ken Gampu, Gert van den Bergh	Adventure	Paramount
Never Too Late	Bud Yorkin	Paul Ford, Maureen O'Sullivan, Connie Stevens	Comedy	Warner Bros.
Nightmare in the Sun	Marc Lawrence	John Derek, Ursula Andress, Sammy Davis, Jr.	Crime drama	Independent
None But The Brave	Frank Sinatra	Frank Sinatra, Tatsuya Mihashi, Clint Walker, Tommy Sands, Brad Dexter, Tony Bill	War drama	Warner Bros.; only film Sinatra directed
Once a Thief	Ralph Nelson	Alain Delon, Ann-Margret, Van Heflin, Jack Palance	Crime	MGM
One Way Wahine	William O. Brown	Joy Harmon, Anthony Eisley, Edgar Bergen	Comedy	Independent
Operation C.I.A.	Christian Nyby	Burt Reynolds, Danielle Aubrey, John Hoyt	Thriller	Allied Artists
The Outlaws Is Coming	Norman Maurer	Moe Howard, Larry Fine, Joe DeRita	Comedy	Columbia
A Patch of Blue	Guy Green	Sidney Poitier, Elizabeth Hartman, Shelley Winters	Drama	MGM. Oscar for Winters
Promise Her Anything	Arthur Hiller	Warren Beatty, Leslie Caron	Comedy	Paramount
A Rage to Live	Walter Grauman	Suzanne Pleshette, Bradford Dillman, Ben Gazzara	Drama	United Artists. From John O'Hara novel
Rapture	John Guillermin	Melvyn Douglas, Patricia Gozzi, Dean Stockwell	Drama	20th Century Fox
The Ravagers	Eddie Romero	John Saxon, Fernando Poe Jr., Robert Arevalo	War	Independent
Red Line 7000	Howard Hawks	James Caan, Laura Devon, Charlene Holt	Sports	Paramount
Requiem for a Gunfighter	Spencer Gordon Bennet	Rod Cameron, Stephen McNally, Mike Mazurki	Western	Embassy Pictures
The Reward	Serge Bourguignon	Max von Sydow, Yvette Mimieux, Gilbert Roland	Western	20th Century Fox
Ride in the Whirlwind	Monte Hellman	Jack Nicholson, Millie Perkins, Harry Dean Stanton	Western	written by Nicholson
The Rounders	Burt Kennedy	Henry Fonda, Glenn Ford, Chill Wills, Sue Ane Langdon	Western comedy	MGM; from a novel by Max Evans
Runaway Girl	Hamil Petroff	Lili St. Cyr, Jock Mahoney, Laurie Mitchell	Crime	Independent

== S–Z ==
Title	Director	Cast	Genre	Note
The Sandpiper	Vincente Minnelli	Elizabeth Taylor, Richard Burton, Eva Marie Saint, Robert Webber, Charles Bronson	Drama	MGM; won Oscar for Best Song
The Satan Bug	John Sturges	George Maharis, Anne Francis	Science fiction	from Alistair MacLean novel
Sergeant Deadhead	Norman Taurog	Frankie Avalon, Deborah Walley, Cesar Romero	Musical	A.I.P.
Shenandoah	Andrew V. McLaglen	James Stewart, Doug McClure, Katharine Ross, Glenn Corbett, Rosemary Forsyth	War, drama	Universal
Ship of Fools	Stanley Kramer	Vivien Leigh, Simone Signoret, Lee Marvin, José Ferrer, Oskar Werner, Elizabeth Ashley, George Segal, Michael Dunn (actor)	Drama	Columbia. 8 Oscar nominations; Leigh's final film
Situation Hopeless... But Not Serious	Gottfried Reinhardt	Alec Guinness, Mike Connors, Robert Redford	POW Comedy	Paramount
Ski Party	Alan Rafkin	Frankie Avalon, Dwayne Hickman, Yvonne Craig	Musical comedy	A.I.P.
The Slender Thread	Sydney Pollack	Sidney Poitier, Anne Bancroft, Telly Savalas	Drama	Paramount
Son of a Gunfighter	Paul Landres	Russ Tamblyn, Kieron Moore, Fernando Rey	Western	MGM
The Sons of Katie Elder	Henry Hathaway	John Wayne, Dean Martin, Earl Holliman, George Kennedy, James Gregory, Martha Hyer	Western	Paramount
The Sound of Music	Robert Wise	Julie Andrews, Christopher Plummer, Peggy Wood, Eleanor Parker, Richard Haydn	Musical, family	20th Century Fox; won 5 Oscars; from Maria von Trapp book
Space Probe Taurus	Leonard Katzman	Francine York, James Brown	Science fiction	A.I.P.
Strange Bedfellows	Melvin Frank	Rock Hudson, Gina Lollobrigida, Gig Young	Comedy	Universal
A Swingin' Summer	Robert Sparr	Raquel Welch, James Stacy	Comedy	Independent. Welch's first starring role
The Sword of Ali Baba	Virgil W. Vogel	Jocelyn Lane, Frank McGrath, Gavin MacLeod	Adventure	Universal
Sylvia	Gordon Douglas	Carroll Baker, George Maharis, Peter Lawford	Drama	Paramount
Synanon	Richard Quine	Edmond O'Brien, Chuck Connors, Stella Stevens	Drama	Columbia
Taffy and the Jungle Hunter	Terry O. Morse	Jacques Bergerac, Manuel Padilla Jr.	Adventure	Allied Artists
That Darn Cat!	Robert Stevenson	Hayley Mills, Dean Jones, Dorothy Provine, Roddy McDowall, Neville Brand, Frank Gorshin, Elsa Lanchester, Ed Wynn, William Demarest	Family, comedy	Disney
That Funny Feeling	Richard Thorpe	Sandra Dee, Bobby Darin, Donald O'Connor	Comedy	Universal
The Third Day	Jack Smight	George Peppard, Elizabeth Ashley, Roddy McDowall	Drama	Warner Bros.
A Thousand Clowns	Fred Coe	Jason Robards, Martin Balsam, Barbara Harris, William Daniels, Barry Gordon, Gene Saks	Comedy, Drama	United Artists; Oscar for Balsam
Thunderball	Terence Young	Sean Connery, Claudine Auger, Adolfo Celi	Spy	United Artists
Tickle Me	Norman Taurog	Elvis Presley, Julie Adams, Jocelyn Lane	Musical	Allied Artists
Town Tamer	Lesley Selander	Dana Andrews, Terry Moore, Pat O'Brien	Western	Paramount
The Truth About Spring	Richard Thorpe	Hayley Mills, John Mills, Lionel Jeffries	Drama	Universal
Two on a Guillotine	William Conrad	Connie Stevens, Cesar Romero, Dean Jones	Horror	Warner Bros.
Up from the Beach	Robert Parrish	Cliff Robertson, Red Buttons, Irina Demick	War	20th Century Fox
A Very Special Favor	Michael Gordon	Rock Hudson, Leslie Caron, Charles Boyer	Romantic comedy	Universal
Village of the Giants	Bert I. Gordon	Tommy Kirk, Johnny Crawford, Beau Bridges, Joy Harmon	Sci-fi comedy	Embassy
Von Ryan's Express	Mark Robson	Frank Sinatra, Trevor Howard, Raffaella Carrà	War	20th Century Fox; from David Westheimer novel
The War Lord	Franklin J. Schaffner	Charlton Heston, Richard Boone, Rosemary Forsyth	Historical	Universal
War Party	Lesley Selander	Davey Davison, Don "Red" Barry	Western	20th Century Fox
What's New Pussycat?	Clive Donner	Peter Sellers, Peter O'Toole, Paula Prentiss, Romy Schneider, Woody Allen, Capucine	Comedy	United Artists; Allen's film debut
When the Boys Meet the Girls	Alvin Ganzer	Connie Francis, Harve Presnell, Peter Noone	Musical	MGM
Wild on the Beach	Maury Dexter	Frankie Randall, Sherry Jackson, Cher, Sonny Bono	Comedy	20th Century Fox
Wild Seed	Brian G. Hutton	Michael Parks, Celia Kaye	Drama	Universal
Willy McBean and his Magic Machine	Arthur Rankin, Jr.		Animation	Rankin-Bass Productions
Winter A-Go-Go	Richard Benedict	James Stacy, William Wellman Jr., Beverly Adams	Comedy	Columbia
The World of Abbott and Costello	Sidney Miller	Bud Abbott, Lou Costello	Compilation	Universal
Young Dillinger	Terry O. Morse	John Ashley, Nick Adams, Robert Conrad	Crime	Allied Artists
Young Fury	Christian Nyby	Rory Calhoun, Virginia Mayo	Western	Paramount
Zebra in the Kitchen	Ivan Tors	Jay North, Martin Milner, Andy Devine	Family	MGM

== See also ==
- List of 1965 box office number-one films in the United States
- AFI Catalog of Feature Films
- 1965 in the United States

== Notes ==
=== References ===
- Curti, Roberto (2015). Italian Gothic Horror Films, 1957–1969. Jefferson, NC: McFarland. ISBN 978-1-4766-1989-7.
