= Wild Wild Winter =

1966 film by Lennie Weinrib

- Directed by: Lennie Weinrib
- Written by: Sam Locke
- Produced by: Bart Patton
- Starring: Gary Clarke; Chris Noel; Don Edmonds; Susie Kaye; Les Brown Jr. Vicky Albright; James Wellman; Steve Franken; Steven Rogers; Loren Janes; Charla Doherty; Paul Geary; Val Avery; James Frawley; Dick Miller; Mark Sturges
- Music by: Jerry Long (Score); The Beau Brummels; Jay and the Americans; Dick and Dee Dee; The Astronauts
- Distributed by: Universal Pictures
- Release date: January 5, 1966
- Running time: 80 minutes
- Country: United States
- Language: English
- Budget: $225,000

Wild Wild Winter is a 1966 Universal Pictures beach party comedy film directed by standup comedian Lennie Weinrib and starring Gary Clarke and Chris Noel. It was produced by Bart Patton and is notable for featuring Jay and the Americans and the duo of Dick and Dee Dee in their only film appearances. The Beau Brummels, Jackie and Gayle and The Astronauts also perform onscreen.

== Plot ==
Fraternity brothers at Alpine College in the snow-covered mountains of Lake Tahoe recruit Ronnie Duke (Clarke), a surfer friend from California to seduce Susan Benchley (Noel), head of the school sorority and secretary to Dean Carlton (James Wellman), because Susan has brainwashed the other female students on campus to avoid dating the boys.

Ronnie sets out a plan to become captain of the ski team and win over Susan, who is engaged to John Harris (Steve Franken), while he also attempts to save the school from its financial troubles.

== Cast ==
- Gary Clarke as Ronnie
- Chris Noel as Susan
- Steve Franken as John
- Don Edmonds as Burt
- Suzie Kaye as Sandy
- Les Brown Jr. as Perry
- James Wellman as Dean
- Val Avery as Fox
- James Frawley as Stone
- Anna Lavelle as Bus Bit Girl
- Linda Rogers as Trisha
- Buck Holland as McGee
- The Beau Brummels
- The Astronauts
- Loren Janes as The Bear
- Jay & the Americans
- Dick Miller as Rilk
- Steven Rogers as Benton

== Production notes ==
This film was shot on location at the Alpine Meadows Ski Resort in Alpine Meadows, near Lake Tahoe, California.

Wild Wild Winter is the last of four films in the beach party genre that made use of a winter setting. The other three are MGM’s Get Yourself a College Girl (1964), AIP’s Ski Party (1965), and Columbia Pictures’ Winter A-Go-Go (1965).

A follow-up to Lennie Weinrib's previous beach party film, Beach Ball, this film was originally titled Snow Ball, then Snowbound (the only lyrics to Wild Wild Winter’s opening theme song are “Snowbound, snowbound!”) While technically not a sequel to Beach Ball, this film uses the same writer (Sam Locke), producer and director as well four actors from that film’s cast: Chris Noel (named Susan in both films), Don Edmonds, James Wellman and Dick Miller. Universal signed Weinrib and Patton to a seven year contract on the basis of Beach Ball. The film's working title was Snow Ball.

The contract with Universal was to make two films a year for seven years.

Weinrib’s directing career consisted of only three films – all in the beach party genre: the aforementioned Beach Ball from 1965, and both Wild Wild Winter and Out of Sight from 1966.

The Astronauts was a Boulder, Colorado-based surf band who had a Billboard Top 100 hit in 1963 with their song “Baja.” They appeared in three other beach party films (Surf Party, Wild on the Beach and Out of Sight) – more than any other surf band.

== Music ==
The composer for the film, Jerry Long also wrote the score for another beach party film, Catalina Caper. Both films are his only onscreen credits.

"Wild Wild Winter", the theme song to the film, was composed by Chester Pipkin.

The Beau Brummels are shown performing their own "Just Wait and See".

The Astronauts perform "A Change of Heart", written by Mark Gordon and the film's composer Chester Pipkin.

Al Capps and Mary Dean wrote two songs heard in the film, "Our Love's Gonna Snowball", sung by Jackie and Gayle; and "Heartbeats", sung by Dick and Dee Dee with the Astronauts shown as performing back-up.

The Astronauts are also shown as providing back-up for Jay and the Americans' performance of “Two of a Kind," written by Victor Millrose and Tony Bruno.

A soundtrack to the film was released on Decca Records in December 1965.

== Reception ==
The film reportedly made a profit. However, Weinrib and Patton only made one more film for Universal, Out of Sight (1966).

The New York Times called it "colorful, yes, but wearying." Filmink called it "fun and light".

== See also ==
- List of American films of 1966
- Get Yourself a College Girl
- Ski Party
- Winter A-Go-Go
