= Bart Patton =

American film director

- Born: Phillip Bardwell; 11 July 1939 (age 87); Culver City, California, U.S.
- Years active: 1955-1993
- Spouse: Mary Mitchel (1961-1980) (divorced) (2 children)

Bart Patton (born Phillip Bardwell; 11 July 1939 in Culver City, California), is an American actor, producer, and director.

== Biography ==
Bart's first acting job was as Scampy the Clown in Super Circus where he was credited as "Bardy Patton". He continued making acting appearances in such television shows as 77 Sunset Strip while in high school. He replaced Burt Reynolds on Riverboat.

Patton attended UCLA, where he met his future wife, Mary Mitchel, his best friend Pete (John) Broadrick and Francis Ford Coppola, with whom he and Pete made a student film with. He dropped out after only one semester to make Gidget Goes Hawaiian, marrying Mitchel in 1961 after completion of the film. They had two children and divorced in 1980.

Coppola cast the couple in his Dementia 13 that introduced him to producer Roger Corman and Jack Hill, who reshot some of the film. Patton moved behind the camera in Hill's Spider Baby as production manager and assistant director whilst Mary Mitchel co-starred. Corman used Patton to produce additional footage for some of his films for television release.

Corman financed Patton's first film, Beach Ball, as a producer. Universal Pictures was impressed, with Universal and MCA signing a contract in 1965 for Patton and director Lennie Weinrib to make 14 rock and roll films in a two-year period. However, the only ones produced were a ski party type film, Wild Wild Winter, and a spy spoof, Out of Sight. Patton also produced Coppola's The Rain People.

In 1975, Patton met makeup artist Judy Ponder when both were hired on the same day to work on The Farmer. This chance meeting led to a lifelong partnership. In 1980, they were married at the Pacific Palisades home of commercial director, Bob Reagan, Sr. and welcomed a baby son later that year. He made his directorial debut with Unshackled in 2000 adding director to a career that already encompassed acting, producing, and production management.

== Filmography ==
Year	Title	Role	Notes
1959	Operation Dames	Sentry	
1960	Because They're Young	Michael Kramer	
1960	Strangers When We Meet	Hank	Uncredited
1961	Gidget Goes Hawaiian	Wally Hodges	
1962	Zotz!	Mr. Crane	Uncredited
1963	Dementia 13	Billy Haloran	
1971	THX 1138	Announcer	Voice
