= Richard Chaves =

American actor

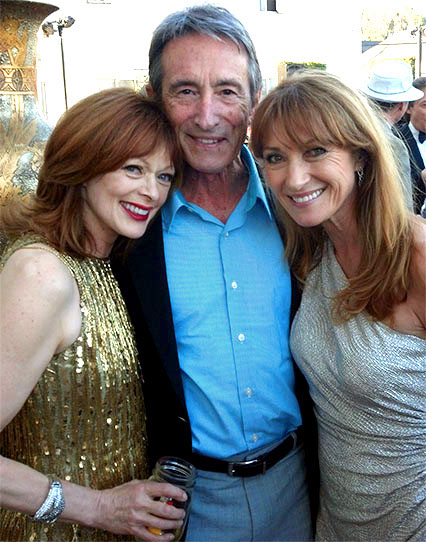
- Chaves with Frances Fisher and Jane Seymour in 2013
- Born: October 9, 1951 (age 74); Jacksonville, Florida, U.S.
- Occupation: Actor
- Years active: 1981–present

Richard Chaves (/ˈtʃɒvɛʒ/ CHAH-vez; born October 9, 1951) is an American actor. He is best known for his portrayal of Poncho in the science fiction film Predator and as Lieutenant Colonel Ironhorse in the television series War of the Worlds.

== Early life ==
Chaves was born in Jacksonville, Florida, to a career United States Marine officer father who later worked for the Drug Enforcement Administration. Chaves studied acting at Occidental College before joining the U.S. Army in May 1970, serving a tour of duty in Vietnam as an infantryman in the 196th Infantry Brigade. He was discharged from the Army in 1973 at the rank of Specialist 4.

== Career ==
Chaves helped write the critically acclaimed stage drama Tracers. In the early 1980s, he began work as an actor taking on various soap opera roles until he gained a role in 1987 as Poncho in the science fiction film Predator. Soon afterward, his career received another boost with the role of Lt. Colonel Ironhorse in the television series War of the Worlds. Chaves once calculated that the volume of fan mail he received outnumbered the rest of the cast members by a four or five to one ratio.

However, his career hit a bump when War of the Worlds was given new creative management for its second season. The new executives did not think that the Ironhorse character worked with the format they wanted for the show, so his character and that of Norton Drake were killed off.

His most recent acting appearances were in the films Lost Warrior: Left Behind, Dark House and Beyond the Game.

== Works ==
=== Stage ===
- 19?? Pendleton Blankst
- 19?? Vietnam Trilogy
- 19?? Labyrinth
- 19?? Macbeth
- 19?? Romeo & Juliet
- 1980/85 Tracers (co-author) ... Dinky Dau
- 1995 Santos & Santos ... Miguel Santos
- 1997 Police Officer's Wives (P.O.W.) ... Franko
- 2001 Pvt. Wars ... Silvio

=== Movies ===
- 1981 Fire on the Mountain ... Army Lieutenant
- 1985 Witness ... Detective
- 1985 Cease Fire ... Badman
- 1986 Penalty Phase ... Nolan Esherman
- 1987 Kenny Rogers as The Gambler, Part III: The Legend Continues ... Irondog (Sioux Indian)
- 1987 Predator ... Jorge "Poncho" Ramirez
- 1988 Onassis: The Richest Man in the World ... Turkish Officer
- 1988 To Heal a Nation ... Veteran
- 1989 L.A. Takedown (aka Crimewave) ... Lou Casals
- 1992 Night Eyes 2 ... Hector Mejenes
- 1994 Night Realm ... Ursis
- 1996 Baja Run ... Domingo
- 1997 Weapons of Mass Distraction ... Senator Ramirez
- 1998 Lone Greasers (30 min. short film) ... Las Vegas police officer
- 2007 Blizhniy Boy: The Ultimate Fighter ... Prison Guard
- 2008 Lost Warrior: Left Behind ... Captain Johansson
- 2009 Dark House ... Officer Jones
- 2016 Beyond the Game ... Captain Johansson

=== Television ===
- 1981 Eight Is Enough (Season 5 Episode: "Father Knows Best?") ... U.S. Marine Captain "Bobo"
- 1982 Dallas (Season 5 Episode 13: "The Search") ... Bernie
- 1983 St. Elsewhere (Season 1 Episode 17: "Brothers") ... Tim Potts
- 1983 Hill Street Blues (Season 4 Episode 10: "The Russians Are Coming") ... Doctor
- 1987 Miami Vice (Season 3 Episode 16: "Theresa") ... District Attorney Martinez
- 1988 Ohara (Season 2 Episode 10: "They Shoot Witnesses Don't They?") ... Earl Baker
- 1988 War of the Worlds (Season 1: all 24 episodes; Season 2 Episode 1: "The Second Wave") ... Lieutenant Colonel Paul Ironhorse
- 1990 L.A. Law (Season 4 Episode 19: "Bang... Zoom... Zap") ... Carlos Mendez
- 1990 MacGyver (Season 5 Episode 15: "The Treasure of Manco") ... Enrique Vasquez
- 1990 MacGyver (Season 6 Episode 1: "Tough Boys") ... Detective Anthony "Manny" Lopez
- 1990 Trials of Rosie O'Neill (Season 1 Episode 10: "Mr. Right") ... Detective John Santos
- 1991 Sons and Daughters (Season 1 Episode 9: "Throw Momma from the Terrain") ... Michael Valdez
- 1991 Sons and Daughters (Season 1 Episode 13: "Nose to Nose") ... Michael Valdez
- 1992 FBI: The Untold Stories (Episode: "The Blue Fiber") ... Detective Joe Swiski
- 1994 Babylon 5 (Season 1 Episode 7: "The War Prayer") ... Alvares
- 1995 Star Trek: Voyager (Season 2 Episode 9: "Tattoo") ... Tribal Chief
- 1996 Walker, Texas Ranger (Season 4 Episode 22: "Deadline") ... Special Agent Samuel Mills
- 2001 Days of Our Lives ("Episode #1.9106") ... Captain Eduardo
- 2001 Days of Our Lives ("Episode #1.9108") ... Captain Eduardo
- 2001 Days of Our Lives ("Episode #1.9110") ... Captain Eduardo
- 2001 Days of Our Lives ("Episode #1.9111") ... Captain Eduardo

=== Voice ===
- 1987 Dear America: Letters Home from Vietnam ... himself / additional dialogue
- 2010 Elf Sparkle and the Special Red Dress ... Buzzoose
- 2009 Elf Sparkle Meets Christmas the Horse ... Buzzoose
