= Chris Noel =

American actress and entertainer (born 1941)

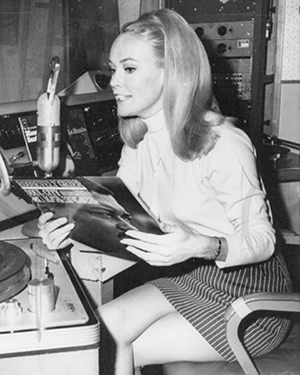
- Chris Noel on the Armed Forces Radio show, "A Date with Chris". Chris Noel had her own radio show during the Vietnam War.
- Born: July 2, 1941 (age 85); West Palm Beach, Florida, U.S.
- Other names: Sandee Noel, Sandra Louise Noel, Miss Christmas (by Troops), The Voice of Vietnam, America's answer to Hanoi Hannah, the next Marilyn Monroe
- Occupations: Actress, radio show host on American Forces Network, cover girl, cheerleader, author, singer, USO entertainer and executive director of a veteran's home.
- Years active: 1963–2010
- Known for: Girl Happy, Wild Wild Winter, USO tours and The Tormentors
- Height: 1.65 m (5 ft 5 in)
- Spouse: Ty Herrington (m. 1969, died)
- Website: vetsville.us

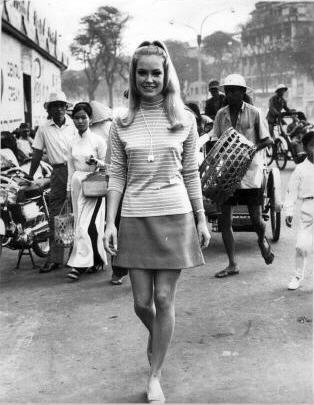
Chris Noel in Vietnam

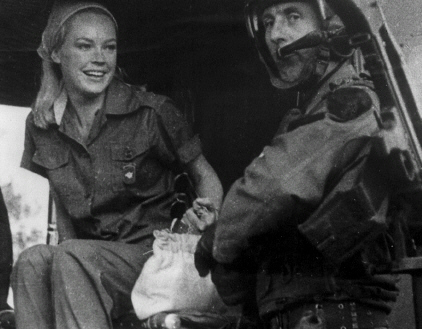
Chris Noel in Vietnam on Huey helicopter ride in 1968, two times her chopper was shot at by enemy ground fire

“I always said I was like a rock pillar. I had to be strong for these guys and never break down and show I was scared or tired.” “No matter what happened, I stayed bubbly. Miss Sunshine. Miss Christmas.” -- “I was the last female voice they (soldiers killed in Vietnam) hear or the last American woman or girl they saw." -- Chris Noel

“I'm no propagandist, I'm just a girl who's trying to make the men she loves happy. You see, I'm in love with half a million men—all our American troops in Vietnam.” Chris Noel

Chris Noel (Sandra Louise Noel, born July 2, 1941) is a retired American actress and entertainer. Noel is best known for her appearances in beach party movies in the 1960s, and for her work on the Armed Forces Radio And Television Service as the "Voice of Vietnam". A popular pin-up girl of the era, Noel made frequent visits to troops, and was at risk many times, having twice been shot at in the helicopters she was riding. She hosted the radio program A Date With Chris, one of Armed Forces Radio's most popular shows.

== Model ==
Noel's picture appeared on the cover of Good Housekeeping magazine when she was 16 years old, and she was painted as a pin-up model by Gil Elvgren. Won the Miss Palm Beach pageant. After moving to New York City, she became a cheerleader for the New York Giants football team. Posters that showed her holding a Kodak Brownie camera were displayed in camera stores. She also had her own modeling school in Lake Park, Florida. Noel was the cover girl for a number of magazines and appeared in advertising for Ford Mustang and other products.

== Vietnam ==
In addition to her work on radio during the Vietnam War, she toured the country eight times, including twice with Bob Hope's USO tours. Her interest in that war's military personnel began with her visit to a San Francisco VA hospital in 1965. At the VA hospital, she sang the song Diamonds Are a Girl's Best Friend and talk to the Vets. She said, "That was the moment. I prayed to God to help me help young men in war." She was considered so valuable to American military morale, that the enemy placed a $10,000 bounty on her. Noel opened the show with the greeting "Hi, Love". Twice her chopper was downed by enemy fire while she was visiting American military personnel in Vietnam. Her radio show A Date with Chris was recorded in California and South Vietnam between 1966 and 1971 for the Armed Forces Radio heard on 300 stations around the world. Noel was the DJ for her show and did interviews with artists including Ray Charles, Lawrence Welk, Robert Mitchum, Marvin Gaye, Nancy Sinatra and others. Noel received the Distinguished Vietnam Veteran award in 1984 from the Veterans Network for her work during the war. Her last visit to South Vietnam was in 1969. Noel first co-hosted an Armed Forces Radio show called Small World, which was a hit and led to her own show. She was dating singer Jack Jones at the time. Noel sang, danced, read poetry, signed autographs, talk to, kissed and hugged the troops in South Vietnam from 1966 to 1970. She is the only woman to travel through South Vietnam to remote bases in helicopters, riding with the door open, next to the gunner. She survived mortar and assault rifle attacks in war zones. Noel broadcast her radio show from Saigon while in South Vietnam. She also made a number of visits troops at the Korean Demilitarized Zone, some with Betty Waldron and Bill Thrasher.

== Singer ==
In the early 1970s, Noel was in New York and was working with Paul Colby, impresario and owner of the Greenwich Village club, The Bitter End. She was performing cover songs by John Prine and needed a backup band, so Colby asked Dennis Lepri, who had worked with Kenny Rogers and Gunhill Road, to form a band for her and produce her sound. After auditioning many New York area musicians, the band "Quilt" was formed. After extensive rehearsals at the Bitter End, the band showcased for selected industry executives to mixed reviews. Sometime after, the band was dissolved and Noel pursued other interests. In 1999 she released the CD Nashville Impact.

== Personal life ==
Following his proposal in a helicopter, Noel wed soldier Green Beret captain Ty Herrington, who she later found out was diagnosed as a "paranoid schizophrenic manic-depressive". He killed himself in December 1969 after they had been married for 11 months. She went on to marry three more times, once to a Texan independent oil producer, another to a guy she met in church, and last to a lawyer. Noel also has written books, her latest book is about filming Cease Fire with Don Johnson. Another book is a 1987 book called Matter of Survival: The "War" Jane Never Saw and the 2011 book, Vietnam And Me her personal memoir of the war. In the 1960s her best friend was Eileen O’Neill and she dated Chad Everett. Chris Noel was asked and attended the dedication of the Vietnam Veterans Memorial in Washington DC in 1982. Noel and Captain Ty Herrington, (Clyde Berkley) born July 2, 1941, were married on January 11, 1969 in Miami. Ty Herrington released a 45 RPM promo single, with the songs: A Gun Don't Make A Man written by Boudleaux & Felice Bryant, and When The Green Berets Come Home written by Boudleaux Bryant in 1968.

“I didn't know how many people were going to remember me,” she said. “But everywhere I went veterans came up to me and thanked me. It felt like I was right back in Vietnam again.”

Noel founded the Women's Interactive Network in 1985 to help women with Post-traumatic stress disorder. In 1993, she opened a shelter in Boynton Beach, Florida, providing space for 10–12 drug-free veterans at a time. In 2019 she received Amvets Silver Helmet Award.

In 2004 a DVD documentary of her life was released Blonde Bombshell: The Incredible True Story of Chris Noel.

In May 2022 Noel was Awarded the Heroes Honor Lifetime Award at the Heroes Honor Festival.

== Los Angeles Veterans Hospital ==
When a group of veterans went on a hunger strike in 1981 at the Los Angeles Veterans Hospital to get better treatment, the Reagan administration asked Noel to act as an intermediary with the veterans. Noel helped negotiate an end to the hunger strike.

== Presidential Medal of Freedom ==
Because of her lifelong work with troops and veterans, as well as for being shot at in an army helicopter twice over South Vietnam, which with surviving assault attacks in the war caused post-traumatic stress disorder, some groups and individuals have petitioned for Chris Noel to be awarded the Presidential Medal of Freedom.

== Film and TV ==
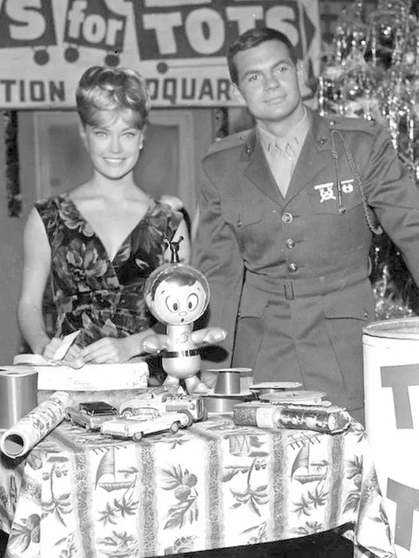
Marine Corps Toys for Tots and Chris Noel in 1966, alongside actor Gary Lockwood

Noel began acting started in 1963 on stage in the Broadway play Mister Roberts with Hugh O'Brian, her boyfriend at the time. Also in the Mister Roberts play was Will Hutchins, Vincent Gardenia, Tony Mordente, Alan Yorke, Vince O'Brien, Bill Fletcher, John J. Martin, directed by Billy Matthews. Noel acting in film started with a role in Soldier in the Rain, with Steve McQueen and included working with Elvis Presley in Girl Happy. She also was in Beach Ball with Edd Byrnes, and Cease Fire with Don Johnson.

== Filmography ==
=== Film ===
| Year | Title | Role | Notes |
|---|---|---|---|
| 1963 | Soldier in the Rain | Frances McCoy | With Steve McQueen |
| 1964 | Honeymoon Hotel | Nancy Penrose | With Robert Goulet |
| 1964 | Looking for Love | Actress | Uncredited |
| 1964 | Diary of a Bachelor | Bachelorette | With Mary Ann Mobley |
| 1964 | Get Yourself a College Girl | Sue Ann Mobley | |
| 1965 | Girl Happy | Betsy | With Elvis Presley |
| 1965 | Joy in the Morning | Mary Ellen Kincaid | With Richard Chamberlain |
| 1965 | Beach Ball | Susan | With Edd Byrnes |
| 1966 | Wild Wild Winter | Susan | With Gary Clarke |
| 1966 | Good Old Days | Pantha | Pilot about cavemen and women |
| 1967 | The Glory Stompers | Chris | With Dennis Hopper |
| 1968 | For Singles Only | Lily | With John Saxon |
| 1971 | The Tormentors | Eve | Theatrical movie |
| 1980 | Detour to Terror | Peggy Cameron | TV movie |
| 1981 | Fly Away Home | Herself | TV movie, Special Thanks (based on her radio broadcasts in Vietnam) |
| 1985 | Cease Fire | Wendy | With Don Johnson |
| 1986 | Sin of Innocence | Wedding Guest #5 | TV movie |

=== Television ===
| Year | Title | Role | Episode(s) |
|---|---|---|---|
| 1963 | The Eleventh Hour | Evelyn | "Try to Keep Alive Until Next Tuesday" |
| 1963 | Bob Hope Comedy Special | Herself | A 1963 TV Special |
| 1963 | The Steve Allen Show | Herself | With Dorothy Lamour and Woody Allen |
| 1964 | The Lieutenant | Ginny | "Between Music and Laughter" |
| 1964 | Bewitched | Susan | "Love Is Blind" |
| 1964 | Hollywood and the Stars | Herself | Teenage Idols, Part 2 |
| 1964 | 21st Golden Globe Awards | Herself | TV special |
| 1965 | Burke's Law | Miss Larchmont / Patience Stevens | 2 episodes |
| 1965 | The Smothers Brothers Show | Claudia | "I Wouldn't Miss My Own Funeral for Anything" |
| 1965 | Perry Mason | Susan Wolfe | "The Case of the Silent Six" |
| 1965 | My Three Sons | Margie | "Marriage and Stuff" |
| 1965 | American Bandstand | Herself | Interview Chris Noel |
| 1965 | My Mother the Car | Helen | "Many Happy No-Returns" |
| 1966 | Occasional Wife | Marilyn | TV show Pilot |
| 1966 | Bob Hope Comedy Special | Herself | TV special, Bob Hope's 25th Anniversary show |
| 1966 | Pistols 'n' Petticoats | Lucy Hanks | TV show Pilot, one episode |
| 1967 | Password | Herself | March 1967 with Roger Smith |
| 1967 | Bob Hope Comedy Special | Herself | A 1967 TV Special |
| 1967 | The Hollywood Palace | Herself | February 25, 1967 TV show |
| 1967 | What's My Line? | Herself | Chris Noel, Feb 5, 1967 TV Show |
| 1967 | Dream Girl of '67 | Herself | Fashion Hostess DJ Miss Chris Noel |
| 1967 | The Joey Bishop Show | Herself | Talk show |
| 1968 | The Pat Boone Show | Herself | 2 Episode |
| 1968 | The Mike Douglas Show | Herself | Episode #7 |
| 1969 | Celebrity Bowling | Herself | |
| 1980 | Wild Times | Dolly | "Episode #1.1" TV Mini Series |
| 1981 | CHiPs | Karen | "11–99: Officer Needs Help" |
| 1989 | B.L. Stryker | Mrs. Tevander | "Blues for Buder" |
| 1989 | China Beach | Herself | "Vets" |
| 2002 | The Definitive Elvis: The Hollywood Years-Part II: 1962–1969 | Herself | Documentary |
| 2012 | Memories from our Military | Herself | Documentary, episode #3, Chris Noel in Vietnam |
| 2015 | Miller Beer Far East Tour Vietnam War Uso Tour | Herself | Tour with Bhetty Waldron and Bill Thrasher, TV Documentary |

== Books ==
Books by Chris Noel:

- Matter of Survival: The "War" Jane Never Saw
- Vietnam And Me, Noel's personal memoir of the war
- Confessions Of A Pin-Up Girl: The Hollywood Sex Symbol Who Became A Vietnam Icon
- Filming Cease Fire
- Filming Happy Girls
- Filming Soldier in the Rain
- Filming The Glory Stompers
- Filming Beach Ball
- Filming College Girl
- Filming For Singles Only
- Filming Wild Times
- Filming Joy in the Morning
- Filming Bewitched Love Is Blind: Behind the Scenes with Liz Montgomery and Dick York
- DVD documentary Blonde Bombshell: The Incredible True Story of Chris Noel

== Broadway ==
- 1963, Mister Roberts, Directed by Billy Matthews, Hugh O'Brian leading role.

== Music ==
- Doll House B side: Mr. and Mrs. Smith - 1968 Single Promo
- Forgotten Man - 1982 Album - Dedicated to Vietnam Veterans
- Nashville Impact – 1999 Album
- ...Next Stop Is Vietnam, The War on Record: 1961-2008 Introduction To "A Date With Chris" - 2010 Album.

== See also ==
- List of entertainers who performed for American troops in Vietnam
- Lee Hansen
- Adrian Cronauer
- Patty Thomas
