= Girl Happy =

1965 American musical romantic comedy film

- Theatrical release poster
- Directed by: Boris Sagal
- Written by: Harvey Bullock; R.S. Allen
- Produced by: Joe Pasternak
- Starring: Elvis Presley; Shelley Fabares; Gary Crosby; Nita Talbot; Joby Baker; Mary Ann Mobley; Harold J. Stone; Chris Noel
- Cinematography: Philip H. Lathrop
- Edited by: Rita Roland
- Music by: George E. Stoll
- Production companies: Euterpe; Metro-Goldwyn-Mayer
- Distributed by: Metro-Goldwyn-Mayer
- Release dates: March 12, 1965 (Alabama); April 14, 1965 (USA)
- Running time: 96 minutes
- Country: United States
- Language: English
- Box office: $3,250,000 (US/ Canada rentals)

Girl Happy is a 1965 American musical romantic comedy and beach party film starring Elvis Presley in his eighteenth feature. The movie won a fourth-place prize Laurel Award in the category Top Musical of 1965. It featured the song "Puppet on a String", which reached #14 on the Billboard Hot 100, #3 on the Adult Contemporary chart and in Canada, and was certified Gold by the RIAA.

== Plot ==
Nightclub singer Rusty Wells (Presley) and his band have just closed their engagement at the Chicago club where they work and are about ready to leave for their annual spring break trip to Fort Lauderdale, Florida—that is, until the club's owner, Big Frank (Harold Stone), extends their stay at his club, foiling the band's plans for some sun and fun in Florida.

At the same time, Big Frank's daughter, college student Valerie (Shelley Fabares) also takes her spring break in Lauderdale with her friends, which worries her father to no end. So at the suggestion of Rusty (who sees this situation as an opportunity for him and the guys to make Lauderdale after all), Big Frank hires Rusty and his band to make the trip to Lauderdale to look after Valerie to make sure she stays out of trouble. But the task isn't easy because Rusty and the guys struggle to keep sex-crazed Italian exchange student Romano (Fabrizio Mioni) away from Valerie, while at the same time Rusty has to keep explaining the situation to his date, a good-time girl named Deena (Mary Ann Mobley), who has no patience for guys who stand her up or keep her waiting.

Rusty's watch over Valerie eventually leads to the two of them falling in love (after Rusty walks Valerie to her motel room, serenading her with "Puppet on a String"). However, after Big Frank reveals to Valerie that he is paying Rusty to be her chaperone, Valerie becomes angry and devastated to the point of going to a local nightclub, getting drunk, and starting a riot, landing everyone there in jail.

When Big Frank arrives in Lauderdale to spring Valerie from jail, he is angry with Rusty at first. But after he sees that Valerie has fallen in love with Rusty, Big Frank makes amends with Rusty, allowing Rusty and Valerie to rekindle their relationship.

== Cast ==
- Elvis Presley as Rusty Wells
- Shelley Fabares as Valerie Frank
- Harold J. Stone as Big Frank
- Gary Crosby as Andy
- Joby Baker as Wilbur
- Jimmy Hawkins as Doc
- Nita Talbot as Sunny Daze
- Mary Ann Mobley as Deena Shepherd
- Fabrizio Mioni as Romano Orlada
- Peter Brooks as Brentwood Von Durgenfeld
- Jackie Coogan as Sgt. Benson
- John Fiedler as Mr. Penchill
- Chris Noel as Betsy
- Gail Gilmore as Nancy (credited as Gale Gilmore)
- Beverly Adams as Girl #2 (uncredited)
- Dan Haggerty as Charlie (uncredited)
- Red West as Extra in the Kit Kat Club (uncredited)

== Production notes ==
Although MGM presented Girl Happy as a beach party film ("Elvis brings his beat to the beach!", "Elvis jumps with the campus crowd to make the beach 'ball' bounce!") and while Presley had appeared shirtless in prior films, he would never appear without a shirt again for the remainder of his professional career. For Girl Happy, Presley wears long sleeve shirts for most of the film, even while water-skiing.

Filming began on June 22, 1964, and finished in late July. Even though the film is set in Fort Lauderdale, Presley did not film any scenes in the city. Primary shooting was done at the MGM studios, and the beach scenes were filmed in Southern California. Only second unit filming was done in Fort Lauderdale.

Alternate titles considered were The Only Way to Love and Girl Crazy. Joe Pasternak had produced the similar spring break movie Where the Boys Are, also set in Fort Lauderdale in 1960. The movie has been called "the most Beach Party-esque" of Elvis' career.

Shelley Fabares, Mary Ann Mobley, and Chris Noel each appeared in a beach party movie before Girl Happy: Fabares in Ride the Wild Surf, and both Mobley and Noel in Get Yourself a College Girl. Shelley Fabares sings "Spring Fever" in a duet with Elvis, and Nita Talbot sings the song "Read All About It". This was the first of three movies in which Fabares co-starred with Elvis.

== Reception ==
Howard Thompson of The New York Times wrote that the film "meanders familiarly" and that "the steady stream of tunes, as rhythmical as they are unoriginal" were its "saving grace." Variety called it "another musical winner," adding "A story line unburdened by anything but lightness and a dozen song numbers belted out in singer's customary style provide the type of pleasant fare which Presley's fans have come to expect." Margaret Harford of the Los Angeles Times called the film "another 'beach musical' that looks livelier and fresher than most." The Monthly Film Bulletin called it "very much a standard Presley vehicle. In other words, Elvis is the only really interesting thing about it."

== Home media ==
The film made its home video debut in December 1988. When it was reissued on VHS in 1997, the song "Startin' Tonight" was deleted. It was eventually reinserted into the film when it made its DVD debut in 2007.

=== DVD reviews ===
- Elvis - The Hollywood Collection (Kissin' Cousins/Girl Happy/Tickle Me/Stay Away, Joe/Live a Little, Love a Little/Charro!) Review by Stuart Galbraith IV at DVD Talk, September 11, 2007.
- Review by Mike Noyes at The DVD Lounge, 08.07.2007.

== See also ==
- List of American films of 1965
