= The Astronauts (band) =

American surf music band

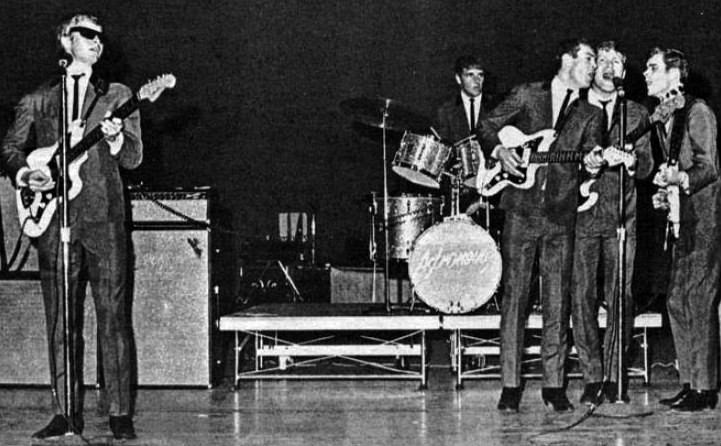
- The band in 1966

Background information
- Origin: Boulder, Colorado, U.S.
- Genres: Surf
- Years active: 1961–1968
- Labels: Palladium, RCA Victor
- Past members: Rich Fifield; Jon "Storm" Patterson; Bob Demmon; Dennis Lindsey; Jim Gallagher; Dick Sellars; Mark Bretz; Rod Jenkins; Robert Carl McLerran

The Astronauts were an American rock band, who had a minor hit in 1963 with "Baja" and remained successful for several years, especially in Japan. They have been described as being, "along with...(the) Trashmen, the premier landlocked Midwestern surf group of the '60s." For most of their career, the band members were Rich Fifield, Jon "Storm" Patterson, Bob Demmon, Dennis Lindsey, and Jim Gallagher.

== Career ==
The Astronauts developed out of a group, The Stormtroupers, which was originally formed at Boulder High School, Boulder, Colorado in 1956 by Jon "Storm" Patterson (vocals, guitar), Robert Graham "Bob" Demmon (guitar; born February 11, 1939), and Brad Leach (drums). In 1961, they became The Astronauts after adding Richard Otis "Rich" Fifield (vocals, guitar) and Dick Sellars (guitar), the change of band name recognising the fascist connotations of the previous name (despite the different spelling) and to pay tribute to local hero, astronaut Scott Carpenter. Patterson switched to bass, Leech was replaced on drums by Jim Gallagher, and soon afterwards Sellars left to join the US Navy, being replaced by Dennis Lindsey. With a line-up of Demmon, Patterson, Fifield, Lindsey and Gallagher, the band gained a strong local reputation, toured as far as Chicago and Dallas, Texas, and released their first single, "Come Along Baby", in 1962, on the small Palladium label. They were signed to RCA Records after a record company executive was impressed by their performance at a local night club, the Tulagi.

Their first single on RCA was "Baja", an instrumental written by Lee Hazlewood originally for his friend, guitarist Al Casey. Released by The Astronauts in early 1963, the track was described as "a typical surf instrumental with a reverberation-heavy twangy guitar and driving drumbeat", and reached # 94 on the Billboard Hot 100 for just one week, the pinnacle of their US chart career. However, they released a succession of further singles on RCA, in an attempt by the record company to emulate the success of the Beach Boys and other surf music-related groups in the charts at the time. According to reviewer Richie Unterberger, "the group shone brightest on their instrumentals, which used mounds of Fender reverb and two rhythm guitars; when they sang, the results were much less successful." Patterson and Fifield shared lead vocals, and the band recorded songs by Roger Christian, Gary Usher, Dick Dale and Henry Mancini, among others. Fifield, the lead guitarist, used a Fender Jazzmaster on the recordings, with an early prototype reverb unit personally loaned to the group by Leo Fender. Their 1965 song "Tomorrow's Gonna Be Another Day" was covered by The Monkees in 1966.

As well as a succession of singles and EPs, the band released four LPs over nine months, starting in May 1963: Surfin' with The Astronauts – which reached # 61 on the Billboard 200 album chart – Everything Is A-OK! (recorded live at the Club Baja in Denver, Colorado), Competition Coupe, and The Astronauts Orbit Campus (recorded live in Boulder).

They appeared several times on the Hullabaloo TV show, and have the distinction of appearing in more beach party movies than any other surf band: Surf Party, Wild on the Beach, Wild Wild Winter and Out of Sight. Regarding the band's performance in 1964's Surf Party, the book Pop Surf Culture states “The Astronauts bang out a thick, reverb-laden instrumental called ‘Firewater,’ and their theme song ‘Surf Party’ happens to be one of the best surf instrumentals ever recorded.” (See Filmography, below)

In 1964, their record company discovered that they had a growing fan base in Japan, where they outsold The Beach Boys and toured with The Ventures. Five albums and three singles made the top 10 there, with "Movin'" – retitled as "Over The Sun" – reaching number one in the country.

In all, they recorded nine albums. Gallagher and Lindsey were drafted for the Vietnam War before the last album, Travelin' Men in 1967, and were replaced by Mark Bretz and Rod Jenkins respectively. Demmon also left, being replaced by Robert Carl McLerran, before Fifield and Patterson finally decided to end the band name after a tour of Asia in 1968.

== Associated acts ==
For a while, the same band – Fifield, Patterson, McLerran, Bretz and Jenkins – performed in the US under the name SunshineWard, who released one single, "Sally Go Around The Roses", in 1967. Patterson then left the band and music business, and Fifield and McLerran formed a new band, Hardwater, with Tony Murillo and Peter M. Wyant. In 1968, the band released two singles and an album, Hardwater, on Capitol Records, produced by David Axelrod. Fifield also had a role in assisting Axelrod and record engineer David Hassinger, who owned the rights to the group name of The Electric Prunes, to find a new group of musicians to take on that group's name for their record, Mass in F Minor. Fifield contacted fellow Colorado musicians, Richard Whetstone, John Herron and Mark Kincaid, who then agreed to form one of the final line-ups of The Electric Prunes.

== Reunion ==
The Astronauts reunited temporarily to perform in Boulder, Colorado, in 1974, 1988 and 1989.

== Later years ==
A four-CD box set of the group's recordings, The Complete Astronauts Collection, was issued on the Collectables label in 1997.

Dennis Lindsey died in Boulder, Colorado, on May 4, 1992. Mark Bretz died August 15, 1999, aged 54. Robert "Bob" Demmon worked as a teacher in Coronado, California, whose students included George Sanger. He died of cardiac arrest on December 18, 2010, at the age of 71.

Rich Fifield died on November 18, 2021. Jim Gallagher died on November 20, 2021, at the age of 78. John 'Storm" Patterson died May 24, 2022 at 81.

== Members ==
Classic line-up in bold
Group name	The Stormtroupers	The Astronauts	The Astronauts	The Astronauts	The Astronauts	SunshineWard	Hardwater
Years	1956-1961	1961-?	?	?-1967 (Certainly the line-up from 1962-1967)	1967	1967	1967-1969
Jon "Storm" Patterson	vocals, guitar	vocals, guitar	vocals, bass	**vocals, bass**	vocals, bass	vocals, bass	
Richard Otis "Rich" Fifield		vocals, guitar	vocals, guitar	**vocals, lead guitar**	vocals, lead guitar	vocals, lead guitar	vocals, lead guitar
Robert Graham "Bob" Demmon	guitar	guitar	guitar	**guitar**			
Dick Sellars		guitar	guitar				
Dennis Lindsey				**guitar**			
Mark Bretz					guitar	guitar	
Robert Carl McLerran					guitar	guitar	bass
Peter M. Wyant							guitar
Brad Leach	drums	drums					
Jim Gallagher			drums	**drums**			
Rod Jenkins					drums	drums	
Tony Murillo							drums

== Discography ==
=== Singles (US releases) ===
==== The Astronauts ====
- "Come Along Baby" / "Tryin' To Get To You" (Palladium, 1962)
- "Baja" / "Kuk" (RCA Victor, 1963) #94 on the Billboard Hot 100
- "Hot-Doggin'" / "Every One But Me" (RCA Victor, 1963)
- "Competition Coupe" / "Surf Party" (RCA Victor, 1963) #124 on Billboard's Bubbling Under Chart
- "Swim, Little Mermaid" / "Go Fight For Her" (RCA Victor, 1964)
- "Main Title From 'Ride The Wild Surf'" / "Around And Around" (RCA Victor, 1964)
- "I'm A Fool" / "Can't You See I Do?" (RCA Victor, 1964)
- "Almost Grown" / "My Sin Is Pride" (RCA Victor, 1965)
- "Tomorrow's Gonna Be Another Day" / "Razzamatazz" (RCA Victor, 1965)
- "It Doesn't Matter Anymore" / "The La La Song" (RCA Victor, 1965)
- "Main Street" / "In My Car" (RCA Victor, 1966)
- "I Know You, Rider" / "Better Things" (RCA Victor, 1967)

==== SunshineWard ====
- "Sally Go Around The Roses" / "Pay The Price" (RCA Victor, 1968)

==== Hardwater ====
- "City Sidewalks" / "Not So Hard" (Capitol, 1968)
- "Plate Of My Fare" / "Good Old Friends" (Capitol, 1969)

=== EPs (US Releases) ===
- The Astronauts (Wurlitzer Disco EP Vol I WLP-9-100) 33 Stereo Jukebox EP
- The Astronauts (Wurlitzer Disco EP Vol II WLP-10-100) 33 Stereo Jukebox EP

=== Singles (Japan releases) ===
- "Che Che Che" (RCA Victor, 45 RPM)
- "Unchain My Heart"/"Twist and Shout" (Victor SS-1568
- "Movin'"/"Unchain My Heart" (Victor spv-12)
- "Koi O Surunara"/"Che Che Che" (Victor 1254)
- "James Bond Theme"/"Goldfinger" (Victor 1526)
- "Taste of Honey"/"Thunderball" (Victor 1647)
- "Pipeline"/"Movin'" (VictorSS-3310)
- "Heartbreak Hotel"/"A Big Hunk of Love" (Victor SS-1640)
- "Swim Little Mermaid"/"Go Fight Fight for Her" (Victor Ss-1547)
- "Main Title Theme 'Ride The Wild Surf'"/"Around and Around" (Victor SS-1503)
- "El Aguila (The Eagle)"/"Happy Ho-Daddy" (Victor SS-1467)
- "Surf Party"/"Kuk" (written by the Astronauts) (Victor SS-1444)
- "Let's Play House"/"Movin'" (Victor SS1428)
- "Pipeline"/"Movin'"(Gold Standard Series; Victor SS-2563)
- "What'd I Say"/"Money" (Victor SS-1483)
- "Movin'"/"Pipeline" (RCA SS-3316)
- "My Sin Is My Pride"/"Almost Grown" (Victor SS1538)
- "Pyramid Stomp"/"Little Speedy Gonzales" (Victor SS-1697)

=== EPs (Japan releases) ===
- Hit Parade Victor SCP-1209 33 Stereo EP
- Movin' (Victor SRS-13) 33 Stereo EP with gatefold cover
- The Astronauts (Victor SCP-1111) 33 Stereo EP
- Surfin' (Victor CP-1128) 33 Stereo EP
- Go Fight!! (Victor SCP 1191) Stereo EP

=== Albums (US releases) ===
==== The Astronauts ====
- Surfin' With The Astronauts (1963)
  - Mono LPM-2760/Stereo LSP-2760
  - Producer - Al Schmitt, Recording Engineer - Dave Hassinger
  - Rating: Week of August 25–31, 1963 album reached No. 61 on the Billboard Top LPs album chart
- Everything Is A-OK! (1963) (live), album reached No. 100 on the Billboard Top LPs
- Competition Coupe (1963), album reached No. 123 on the Billboard Top LPs
- Astronauts Orbit Kampus (1964) (live)
  - Recorded at The Tulagi in Boulder, CO, February 27 - March 1, 1964)
  - US and UK release.
- Go...Go...Go!! (1965)
- Rockin' With The Astronauts (1965) – limited edition promo LP available with Lipton's Iced Tea (compilation)
  - Mono PRM-183 (SNRM-3465)
- (Favorites) For You, (Our Fans), From Us (1965)
- Down The Line (1966)
- Travelin' Men (1967)

==== Hardwater ====
- Hardwater (1968)

=== CD albums ===
==== The Astronauts ====
- Rarities (1991, Germany release)
- The Complete Astronauts Collection (1997. US release)

== Filmography ==
=== Appearing as themselves and as soundtrack artists ===
==== 1964 ====
- Surf Party (performing "Fire Water," and "Surf Party")

==== 1965 ====
- Wild on the Beach (performing "Rock This World," "Little Speedy Gonzalez," "Pyramid Stomp," and "Snap It," also shown as performing back-up for Sonny & Cher on "It's Gonna Rain")

==== 1966 ====
- Wild Wild Winter (performing "A Change of Heart," also shown as performing back-up for Jay and the Americans' performance of "Two of a Kind," and Dick and Dee Dee's "Heartbeats")
- Out of Sight (performing "Baby, Please Don't Go")

== Bibliography ==
- Chidester, Brian & Priore, Domenic (2008). Pop Surf Culture: Music, Design, Film, and Fashion from the Bohemian Surf Boom US: Santa Monica Press pg 171-172. ISBN 1-59580-035-2
