= Out of Sight (1966 film) =

1966 film by Lennie Weinrib

- Film poster by Joseph Smith
- Directed by: Lennie Weinrib
- Screenplay by: Larry Hovis
- Story by: David Asher; Larry Hovis
- Produced by: Bart Patton
- Starring: Jonathan Daly; Karen Jensen; Robert Pine; Deanna Lund; Wende Wagner; Maggie Thrett; Carole Shelyne; Billy Curtis; Norman Grabowski
- Cinematography: John L. Russell
- Edited by: Jack Woods
- Music by: Fred Darian; Al De Lory; Nick Venet
- Distributed by: Universal Pictures
- Release date: April 25, 1966
- Running time: 87 minutes
- Country: United States
- Language: English

Out of Sight is a 1966 comedy film with elements of the spy spoof. It is the third and last of a series of films geared at teenagers by director Lennie Weinrib and producer Bart Patton for Universal Pictures. Patton called it "an over the top kind of thing".

Perhaps inspired by the success of the American International Pictures' teenage films, as well as Weinrib and Patton's Beach Party knockoff Beach Ball, Universal and MCA signed a contract in 1965 for the pair to make 14 rock 'n' roll films in a two-year period; however, the only ones produced were Wild Wild Winter and this film. The title of the film was originally announced as Thunder Blunder a parody of Thunderball.

== Plot ==
Homer (Jonathan Daly) is a butler to secret agent John Stamp. Overhearing a plot to disrupt a concert, Sandra Carter (Karen Jensen) contacts Stamp to seek his assistance but with his boss away, Homer steps into the role of superspy to save rock and roll from the criminal organisation known as F.L.U.S.H. Sandra and Homer must contend with three femme fatale assassins: Scuba (Wende Wagner), Tuff Bod (Deanna Lund) and Wipe Out (Maggie Thrett).

== Production notes ==
Producer Bart Patton and director Lennie Weinrib had made Beach Ball for Roger Corman. The quality of the film on a low budget impressed Lew Wasserman at Universal who signed the team to make two films, Wild Wild Winter and Out of Sight.

Out of Sight features a variety of Universal contract players, musical performances by Gary Lewis and the Playboys, Dobie Gray, Freddie and the Dreamers, The Astronauts, The Turtles and The Knickerbockers provided by music producer Nick Venet, and gadget-laden motor vehicles designed by George Barris. The film's spytime score was composed by Fred Darian (who then managed Dobie Gray) and Al DeLory.

The film was written by Larry Hovis, who was then co-starring in Hogan's Heroes.

This movie is the only onscreen appearance of The Turtles in a feature film.

John Lodge, who plays John Stamp, never reveals his face onscreen.

Although Bob Eubanks is listed in the opening credits, he does not appear onscreen at all; only his voice is heard as the announcer at the concert.

The Astronauts were a Colorado-based surf band who had a Billboard Top 100 hit in 1963 with their song "Baja", and appeared in more beach party movies than any other surf band. These films were Wild Wild Winter, Surf Party, and Wild on the Beach.

Announced in production in November 1965, Out of Sight was filmed in two weeks with exterior sequences done at Zuma Beach.

The futuristic-looking residence of John Stamp and his butler, Homer, is the Lautner-designed Garcia Residence on Mulholland Drive in the Hollywood Hills, built in 1962.

The building and plaza that Stamp and Homer trespass to plant a bomb is the 1963 Ralph Vaughn-designed MCA Tower (aka The Black Tower - now named the Lew R. Wasserman Building) on Lankershim Boulevard in Universal City.

George Barris provided the vehicles used.

The footage of the screaming crowd during the two performances by Freddie & The Dreamers is actually a crowd watching a live performance of the Beatles in 1964, from the documentary What's Happening! The Beatles in the U.S.A.

=== Movie tie-ins ===
Decca Records released the film soundtrack LP with Venet's instrumental theme released on a 45 rpm.

AMT manufactured a model kit of the ZZR dragster.

The Italian title of the film was 007 1/2 agente per forza contro gli assassini dello yé yé .

== Music ==
Fred Darian and Al DeLory composed the music score for the film, Nick Venet produced the instrumental Mariachi-trumpet-accented theme song.

Dobie Gray sings the title song, "(Out of Sight) Out on the Floor" (written by Fred Darian and Al De Lory).

Gary Lewis & the Playboys perform "Malibu Run" (written by Jimmy Karstein, Leon Russell, Gary Lewis and T. Leslie).

The Knickerbockers perform "It's Not Unusual" (written by Gordon Mills and Les Reed).

The Astronauts perform "Baby, Please Don't Go" (written by Big Joe Williams).

The Turtles perform "She'll Come Back" (written by Nita Garfield and Howard Kaylan).

Freddie & The Dreamers perform two songs: "Funny Over You" (written by Freddie Garrity) and "A Love Like You" (written by Quinn & Jones).

== Reception ==
According to Patton "Out of Sight happened and everything stopped" - as in, he and Weinrib were fired from Universal.

=== Critical ===
According to Variety "There’s plenty to see — bikiniclad cuties, a souped-up jalopy and five top rock groups — for the teenage action market, but general adult audiences will probably be pretty cool to Out of Sight. Bart Patton-Lennle Weinrib quickie production has all the ingredients (save a plausible plot) for a strictly commercial half of: a double-billing." Filmink called it "over-reliant on the charms of star Jonathan Daly, although I did like the three female assassins."

== See also ==
- List of American films of 1966

== Notes ==
- Albright, Brian (2008). Wild beyond belief! : interviews with exploitation filmmakers of the 1960s and 1970s. McFarland. ISBN 978-0-7864-3689-7.
