= List of entertainers who performed for American troops in Vietnam =

The following entertainers performed for U.S. military personnel and their allies in the combat theatre during the Vietnam War (1959–1975)

- Roy Acuff (1970)
- Anna Maria Alberghetti
- Ann-Margret
- The Beau-Marks
- Carroll Baker
- Madeleine Hartog-Bel
- Johnny Bench
- Polly Bergen
- Joey Bishop
- Vida Blue
- Jimmy Boyd
- James Brown
- Les Brown
- Anita Bryant
- John W. Bubbles
- Raymond Burr
- Sebastian Cabot
- Vikki Carr
- Jerry Colonna
- Chuck Connors
- Louis Cottrell Jr.
- Phil Crosby
- Vic Damone
- Sammy Davis Jr.
- The Delltones
- Jackie DeShannon
- Phyllis Diller
- Ron Ely
- Dale Evans
- James Drury
- Lola Falana
- Eddie Fisher
- Glenn Ford
- Redd Foxx
- Connie Francis
- James Garner
- Frank Gifford
- The Golddiggers
- Johnny Grant
- Teresa Graves
- Rosey Grier
- Joey Heatherton
- Tippi Hedren
- Charlton Heston
- Don Ho
- The Hondells
- Bob Hope
- The Ink Spots
- Fran Jeffries
- Jack Jones
- Danny Kaye
- Jayne Kennedy
- Dawn Lake
- Ann Landers
- Christy Lane
- Frances Langford
- Piper Laurie
- Vicki Lawrence
- Bobby Limb
- Little Pattie
- Gloria Loring
- Jayne Mansfield
- Mary Martin
- Diane McBain
- Barbara McNair
- Robert Mitchum
- Archie Moore
- Terry Moore
- Rita Moreno
- Jim Nabors
- Patricia Neal
- Julie Newmar
- Wayne Newton
- Nicholas Brothers (Fayard and Harold Nicholas)
- Chris Noel
- Kathleen Nolan
- Pat O'Brien
- Janis Paige
- Fess Parker
- Dian Parkinson
- Melody Patterson
- Denise Perrier
- Suzanne Pleshette
- Mala Powers
- Stefanie Powers
- Charley Pride
- Penelope Plummer
- Martha Raye
- Debbie Reynolds
- The Sapphires (Laurel Robinson and Lois Peeler)
- Roy Rogers
- Bobby Rydell
- Nancy Sinatra
- Roger Smith
- Hank Snow
- Rick Springfield
- Connie Stevens
- Kaye Stevens
- James Stewart
- Jill St. John
- Joe Torre
- Doreen Tracey
- Johnny Unitas
- Mamie Van Doren
- John Wayne
- Raquel Welch
- Lawrence Welk
- Jonathan Winters
