= Beach Ball =

1965 film by Lennie Weinrib

- Theatrical release poster
- Directed by: Lennie Weinrib
- Written by: Sam Locke (Note: Credited as David Malcolm)
- Produced by: Bart Patton; Gene Corman
- Starring: Edd Byrnes; Chris Noel
- Cinematography: Floyd Crosby
- Edited by: Karl Ward
- Production companies: La Honda Service Productions; The Patton Co.
- Distributed by: Paramount Pictures
- Release date: September 29, 1965
- Running time: 83 mins
- Country: United States
- Language: English
- Budget: $125,000 or $137,000
- Box office: $1 million

Beach Ball is a 1965 American beach party comedy film directed by Lennie Weinrib and starring Edd Byrnes and Chris Noel. It was partly financed by Roger Corman. It features appearances by the Supremes, the Walker Brothers, and the Righteous Brothers.

== Plot ==
Dick Martin manages a rock and roll group, The Wigglers (Bango, Jack and Bob). They are told by music store owner Mr Wolf that the group owes him $1,000 for their instruments and have to raise money. Martin tries to convince Susan, the credit union manager for a local college,

== Cast ==
- Edd Byrnes as Dick Martin
- Chris Noel as Susan
- Robert Logan as Bango
- Gail Gilmore as Deborah
- Aron Kincaid as Jack
- Mikki Jamison as Augusta
- Don Edmonds as Bob
- Brenda Benet as Samantha
- Anna Lavelle as Polly
- James Wellman as Mr. Wolf
- The Supremes (Florence Ballard, Diana Ross and Mary Wilson)
- The Four Seasons
- The Righteous Brothers
- The Hondells
- The Walker Brothers
- Dick Miller as a cop
- Sid Haig as drummer for Righteous Brothers (uncredited)

== Production ==
The film was produced by Bart Patton, an actor who did some production work for Roger Corman. Corman paid Patton $100,000 to make a beach party film, of which $22,000 (or $25,000, accounts differ) was already earmarked to Edd Byrnes. Patton wanted to direct but Corman did not let him having already hired comic Lennie Weinrib to make his debut as director. (Patton and Weinrib would later form a production company.)

According to FilmInk, "Roger Corman was never a great one for making musicals – he disliked the genre on the whole, and there are few on his CV. However, the profits made in the mid-‘60s by beach party movies were too alluring for him to ignore and he kicked in a few bucks for some of those."

Stephanie Rothman worked on the movie as a production assistant, shooting second unit for the car chase scene with Aaron Kincaid. Gary Kurtz was assistant director. Patton thought Corman hired Weinrib to direct "because he was a comic and it was a comedy. That was Roger's thinking."

In November 1964, Tommy Kirk was originally announced as male star along with Noel Edmonds. In December 1964, Chris Noel signed and Kirk was still attached. Kirk eventually dropped out of the film and was replaced by Edd Byrnes.

Byrnes called it "a typical mindless beach movie in the spirit of Frankie Avalon and Annette Funicello" and said he was "continually offered this type of film after I was released from my contract at Warner Brothers. However, the producers of Beach Ball were going to give me so much money, it would have been ridiculous to turn down Paramount's generous offer." Byrnes enjoyed making the film calling it a "romp" but he refused to make any more beach moves.

Noel says Byrnes was "a jerk" during the making of the film although the two of them later became friends.

The Supremes were paid $2,500 to appear in the film. The Righteous Brothers got $500 and the Hondells $400.

== Reception ==
Corman pre-sold the film to Paramount for $350,000 and it made $1 million at the box office. (Another account says the film was made for $137,000 and sold to Paramount for $225,000.) Patton claimed "Beach Ball was the last of the struggling attempts to compete with AIP. After that, nobody gave a crap about beach films or ski films or spy spoofs."

The quality of the film impressed Lew Wasserman at Universal, who signed Patton to a two-picture deal: Wild Wild Winter and Out of Sight (both 1966).

=== Critical ===
Variety wrote, "A bouillabaisse of all the tried and true surfing ingredients, this loud, lively pic should prove a winner with the adolescent set. An innocuous plot, lots of bikini scenery, and endless rock 'n' roll featuring top selling recording personalities, assure boxoffice success. "

FilmInk wrote "it's hard to tell the characters apart at times – this was a lesson the AIP knock-offs never learned from AIP beach party movies, which generally had distinctive characters. However, it's a lot of fun."

In his book Hollywood Surf and Beach Movies: The First Wave, 1959–1969, Tom Lisanti called the film "arguably the breeziest and most enjoyable Beach Party clones. It is also the most blatant rip off."

== See also ==
- List of American films of 1965
