= Cease Fire (1985 film) =

1985 film by David Nutter

- Theatrical release poster
- Directed by: David Nutter
- Written by: George Fernandez
- Based on: Vietnam Trilogy by George Fernandez
- Produced by: William Grefé
- Starring: Don Johnson; Lisa Blount; Robert F. Lyons; Richard Chaves; Chris Noel
- Cinematography: Henning Schellerup
- Edited by: Julio Chavez
- Music by: Gary Fry
- Production companies: E.L.F. Productions; Double Helix Films
- Distributed by: Cineworld Enterprises Corporation
- Release date: October 18, 1985
- Running time: 97 minutes
- Country: United States
- Language: English

Cease Fire is a 1985 American independent war drama film directed by David Nutter (in his directing debut) and written by George Fernandez, based on his stage play Vietnam Trilogy. It stars Don Johnson and Lisa Blount.

== Plot ==
Fifteen years after returning home, a Vietnam veteran named Tim finds himself reliving the horror of Vietnam. Tim is searching for a new job with another vet named Luke, separated but hoping to reunite with his wife.

Tim imagines an enemy in his house and crawls through the house searching for the intruder, nearly killing his frightened son in the dark. His wife Paula joins a women's support group, and Tim reluctantly joins a men's group, but is unable to discuss his experiences. Luke tells Tim he is getting together with his wife, but when Tim calls that night he learns Luke was served with divorce papers and is sitting with gun in hand, imagining himself in combat again. Tim hears a pistol shot over the phone and races to help but by the time he arrives at Tim's apartment his body is being removed.

Paula is increasingly unable to understand what Tim is experiencing as his flashbacks to the war become more vivid and painful. She finally convinces him to seek help at a veterans' administration office, where he recalls being on patrol with his friend Badman looking for a POW camp. They discovered a well with 26 dead and bound Americans being eaten by rats, and suffered a number of casualties in an ambush by mortars and machine guns.

== Cast ==
- Don Johnson as Tim Murphy
- Lisa Blount as Paula Murphy
- Robert F. Lyons as Luke
- Richard Chaves as Badman
- Chris Noel as Wendy
- Josh Segal as Ronnie Murphy
- Andrew Garrett as Baby
- Christina Wilfong as Ellen
- Rick Richards as Robbs
- Richard Styles as Ritchie
- Jorge Gil as Sanchez
- John Archie as Rafer
