= Gail Gilmore =

Canadian actress (1937–2014)

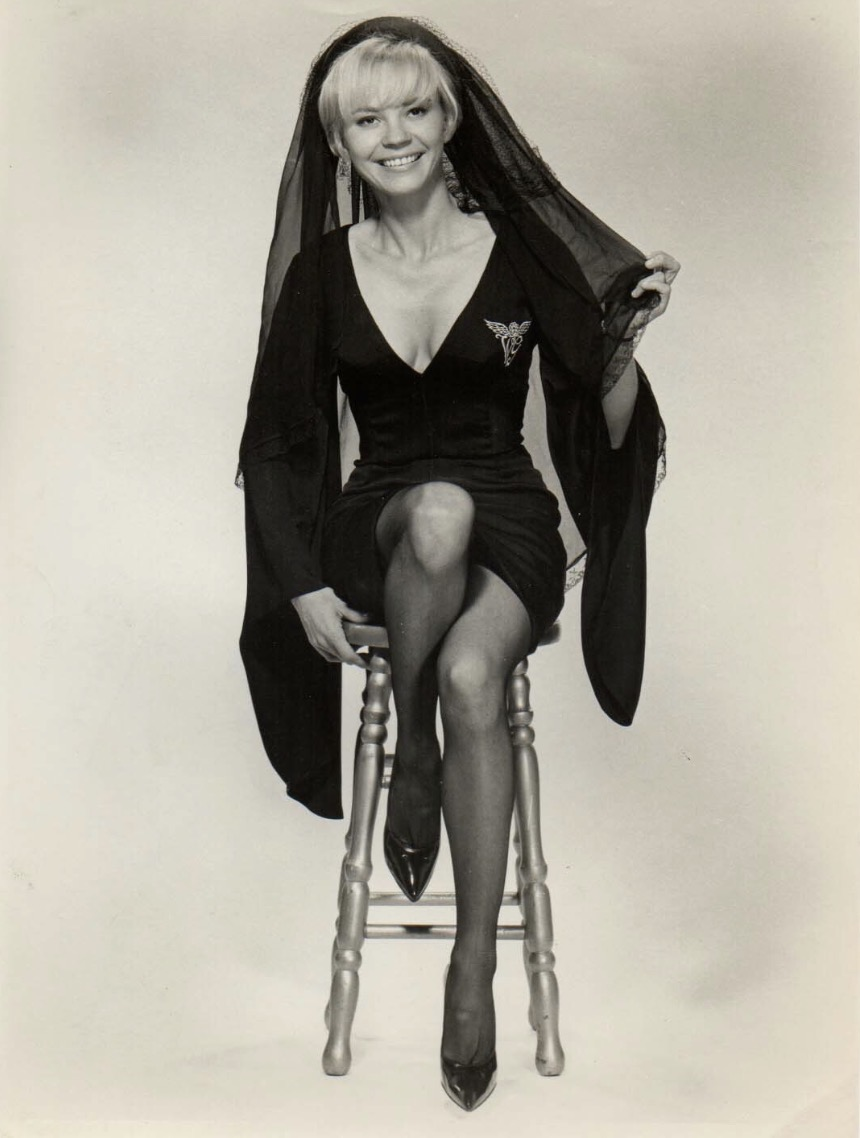
- Gilmore in 1965
- Born: Gail Gerber; October 4, 1937; Edmonton, Alberta, Canada
- Died: March 2, 2014 (aged 76); Sharon, Connecticut, U.S.
- Other names: Gail Gibson
- Occupation: Actress
- Years active: 1964–2008

Gail Gilmore (born Gail Gerber, October 4, 1937 – March 2, 2014) was a Canadian television and film actress. She was from Edmonton, Alberta. She was sometimes known as Gail Gibson.

== Dancing career ==
In 1952, at age 15, she became a member of Les Grands Ballets Canadiens. In November 1963, at the age of 26, she posed in a tight-fitting sweater for Playboy magazine as one of "The Girls from Canada". She taught ballet in the Berkshires from 1973–95. She later changed her surname to "Gilmore".

== Acting career ==
Amidst her dancing career, she began an acting career in 1964 when she played in four television series: Mr. Novak, My Three Sons, Perry Mason, and Wagon Train. On stage, she had the lead in the Ivar Theatre's production of Under the Yum Yum Tree in Hollywood.

Between 1964 and 1965, Gilmore appeared in six movies. Gilmore co-starred with Elvis Presley twice, playing a vacationing coed in Girl Happy (1965) and a dancing gypsy in Harum Scarum (1965). She then frolicked on the seashores of sunny Southern California in The Girls on the Beach (1965) and Beach Ball (1965) before growing to gigantic proportions along with five other delinquent teenagers who terrorize Hainesville, California, in Village of the Giants (1965). After finishing on the set of The Loved One (1965), Gilmore met writer Terry Southern. Subsequently the couple left Hollywood in 1966 and lived together in New York City and later Connecticut. She remained Southern's companion until his death in 1995.

== Writing and teaching ==
In 2009, she published her autobiography, "Trippin' with Terry Southern: What I Think I Remember", with co-author Tom Lisanti. Although the book is focused on the 30 years she spent with Terry Southern, details of her childhood and acting career are given. During Southern's decline and after his death, she remained on the East Coast and supported herself by teaching ballet. In 2010, the book was awarded the Independent Publisher Book Award Silver Medal. After her acting career ended, she taught ballet for 25 years.

== Death ==
On March 2, 2014, Gilmore, a smoker, died in Sharon, Connecticut of complications arising from lung cancer, aged 76.
