= Lennie Weinrib =

American actor (1935–2006)

- Weinrib in The Waltons, 1974
- Born: Leonard Weinrib; April 29, 1935; New York City, New York, U.S.
- Died: June 28, 2006 (aged 71); Santiago, Chile
- Occupations: Actor; comedian; writer
- Years active: 1958–1992
- Known for: Original voice actor for Scrappy-Doo in the Scooby-Doo Franchise
- Children: 3

Leonard Weinrib (April 29, 1935 – June 28, 2006) was an American actor, comedian and writer. He is best known for playing the title role in the children's television show H.R. Pufnstuf, Grimace in McDonaldland commercials, the title role in Inch High, Private Eye, the original voice of Scrappy-Doo on Scooby-Doo and Scrappy-Doo, Hunk and Prince Lotor on Voltron, and Bigmouth on The Smurfs. He also was the voice for Timer in the "Time for Timer" ABC public service announcements in the early 1970s.

== Life and career ==
A native of the Bronx, Weinrib got his start in show business working with Spike Jones, then later in The Billy Barnes Revue. He made guest appearances on The Dick Van Dyke Show, The Many Loves of Dobie Gillis, Burke's Law, The Munsters, Happy Days and Adam-12. He charted nationally (Music Vendor, #132) with the comedy single "Prez Conference" in 1962. He also guest starred in an Emergency! episode called "Firehouse Four" as Fred Gibson, an overweight, accident-prone man. Woody Allen's character in his 1995 film Mighty Aphrodite was named "Lenny Weinrib".

== Voice actor ==
He was most notable for his voice acting work. Starting with The Flintstones where he provided the dialogue for Jimmy Darrock, Weinrib provided numerous voices for such animated series as Inch High, Private Eye, The New Adventures of Batman, Tarzan and the Super 7, and Hong Kong Phooey. He was the voice for both Roland and Rattfink in that series of cartoon shorts. He also provided the voice of Timer in the 1970s "Time for Timer" series of educational spots shown on the ABC network. In Voltron: Defender of the Universe, he voiced both Hunk and the villain Prince Lotor in the "Lion Voltron series", as well as Captain Newley and Cliff in the "Vehicle Voltron" series. He also voiced a secretary bird and king Leonidas the lion in the animated sequence of the Disney film Bedknobs and Broomsticks. Another Disney role Weinrib voiced was an evil sorcerer named Zorlok for an episode of Disney's Adventures of the Gummi Bears. He also voices the school bully Lenny Warthog on the NBC series Kissyfur.

He also lent his voice to Superman in 1970 for a Sesame Street sketch of a lecture about words beginning with "S" which happened to be the character's favorite letter of the alphabet. Weinrib again voiced the Man of Steel, and his alter-ego Clark Kent, for a 1972 episode of The Brady Kids, "Cindy's Super Friend".

Weinrib voiced Davey Jones' Uncle Sedgwick, Hotel Desk Clerk and Shaggy's Great-Uncle Nathaniel on The New Scooby-Doo Movies. He voiced Cap'n Noah Smitty in Yogi's Ark Lark. He also was the original voice of Scrappy-Doo on the Scooby-Doo and Scrappy-Doo TV series before Don Messick took over the role.

He voiced the title role in H.R. Pufnstuf throughout the show's entire run from 1969 through 1971, and also wrote every episode of the series. He also appeared as H.R. Pufnstuf as a guest on The Dating Game in Christmas 1972 and on one episode of the TV show CHiPs in 1977. On The Krofft Supershow, he played the title character in Magic Mongo.

He did the voices for Moonrock and Sergeant Boulder on The Flintstone Comedy Show. in 1977, he voiced the title character on the CB Bears segment "Heyyy. it's the King". In 1986, he was the original voice of Freddy Flintstone on The Flintstone Kids, before Scott Menville replaced him the following season. In 1991, he voiced Max the Mole on the all-star Hanna-Barbera animated series Yo Yogi!.

== Live action ==
Weinrib appeared on The Dick Van Dyke Show three times, each time playing a similar character, a loud, over-the-top, insult-type comedian. This character was named "Jackie Brewster" ("Buddy Can You Spare a Job", 1961), "Danny Brewster" ("The Sam Pomerantz Scandals", 1963), and "Phil Franklin" ("The Impractical Joke", 1965). He also appeared in Miniature, a Twilight Zone episode in 1963.

He appeared on single episodes of The Man From U.N.C.L.E. ("Winky Blintz" in "The Off-Broadway Affair", 1966) Happy Days ("Duke" in "Ritchie's Cup Runneth Over", 1974), and on two episodes of Adam-12 in 1973 and 1974 as Tony the police garage mechanic. He also guest starred in the 1974 Emergency! episode called "Firehouse Four" as Fred Gibson.

== Directing ==
Weinrib's directing career consists of three feature films, all in the beach party genre: Beach Ball for Paramount in 1965, and Wild Wild Winter and Out of Sight, both for Universal in 1966. Weinrib also co-wrote the 1963 joke book The Elephant Book.

== Retirement and death ==
Weinrib retired from acting in the 1990s and moved to Santiago, Chile.

For the Family Guy episode "Petarded", Seth MacFarlane explained on the Season 4 DVD commentary he wanted to use Weinrib to voice Timer for a cutaway gag, but Weinrib was suffering from failing health when "Petarded" was being produced, and as MacFarlane explained, he "didn't remember doing it" after the recorded audio was played back for him later. In the end, Timer was voiced by Seth himself.

Weinrib died in a hospital near his home on June 28, 2006, after suffering a stroke.

== Filmography ==
=== Voices ===
- H.R. Pufnstuf - Voices of H.R. Pufnstuf, Orson Vulture, Stupid Bat, Hippie Tree, Bela Lugosi Tree, Dr. Blinky's Talking Book, Alarm Clock, Polka Dotted Horse, Pop Lolly, West Wind
- Lidsville - Voices of Mr. Big, Colonel Poom, Captain Hooknose, Rah Rah, Mr. Chow, Tex, Tonsilini, Pierre LeSewer
- The Krofft Superstar Hour - Voices of H.R. Pufnstuf, Orson Vulture, Stupid Bat
- The Skatebirds - Voice of Knock-Knock the Woodpecker ("Skatebirds" segment)
- Adventures of the Gummi Bears - Additional Voices
- Barnyard Commandos - Additional Voices
- Captain Caveman and the Teen Angels - Additional Voices
- CB Bears - King, Rattle, Yukayuka
- Doctor Dolittle - Sam Scurvy, various
- Dynomutt, Dog Wonder - Roto Chopper
- Foofur - Additional Voices
- Fred Flintstone and Friends - Additional Voices
- Fraidy Cat - Voices of Elephunt, Ant, Kitty Wizard, Captain Kitt, Sir Walter Cat, Billy the Kit, Jasper Catdaver, Captain Eddie Kittenbakker and Hep Cat
- Galaxy Goof-Ups - Additional Voices
- Garfield and Friends - Additional Voices
- Help!... It's the Hair Bear Bunch! - Additional Voices
- Hong Kong Phooey - Additional Voices
- Inch High, Private Eye - Inch High
- Jabberjaw - Additional Voices
- Jokebook - Additional Voices
- Kissyfur - Charles, Lennie
- Mork & Mindy/Laverne & Shirley/Fonz Hour - Additional Voices
- Pac-Man - Additional Voices
- Partridge Family 2200 A.D. - Jolly Joe
- Rambo: The Force of Freedom - Gripper
- Scooby and Scrappy-Doo - Scrappy-Doo, Bill Walker, Neon Phantom
- Space Cats - Additional Voices
- Space Stars - Dipper
- The Addams Family - Gomez Addams
- The Adventures of Don Coyote and Sancho Panda - Additional Voices
- The All-New Popeye Hour - Additional Voices
- The Amazing Chan and the Chan Clan - Stanley Chan
- The Brady Kids - Superman/Clark Kent
- The Flintstone Comedy Hour - Announcer, Moonrock
- The Flintstone Comedy Show - Moonrock, Sergeant Boulder
- The Flintstone Kids - Freddy Flintstone (1986-1987), Commissioner
- The Flintstones Meet Rockula and Frankenstone (TV special) - Mr. Silika
- The Further Adventures of SuperTed - Additional Voices
- The Great Grape Ape Show - Additional Voices
- The Jetsons - Additional Voices (1985-1987)
- The Kwicky Koala Show - Additional Voices
- The Little Rascals - Additional Voices
- The Most Important Person - Various Voices
- The Mumbly Cartoon Show - Additional Voices
- The New Adventures of Batman - Joker, Mr. Freeze, Chameleon, Moonman, Professor Bubbles, Sweet Tooth, Zarbor, Penguin, Electro, Commissioner Gordon.
- The New Scooby and Scrappy-Doo Show - Griff, Mickey Hack, Gremlin, Additional Voices
- The New Scooby-Doo Movies - Sedgwick Jones, Hotel Desk Clerk, Great-Uncle Nathaniel, Additional Voices
- The Pebbles and Bamm-Bamm Show - Bronto, Moonrock
- The Pink Panther Laugh and a Half Hour and a Half Show - Additional Voices
- The Plastic Man Comedy/Adventure Show - Additional Voices
- The Richie Rich/Scooby-Doo Show - Additional Voices
- The Scooby-Doo Show - Squire Marley, Grey Fox, Additional Voices
- The Scooby & Scrappy-Doo/Puppy Hour - Additional Voices
- The Smurfs - Bigmouth
- The Super Globetrotters - Additional Voices
- The Tom & Jerry Show - Additional Voices
- These Are the Days - Additional Voices
- Trollkins - Additional Voices
- Uncle Croc's Block - Elephunt, Ant, Kitty Wizard, Captain Kitt, Sir Walter Cat, Billy the Kit, Jasper Catdaver, Captain Eddie Kittenbakker, Hep Cat ("Fraidy Cat" segments)
- Voltron - Hunk Garrett, Prince Lotor (Lion Force series); Cliff, Captain Newley (Vehicle Force series)
- Wait Till Your Father Gets Home - Chet Boyle
- Walt Disney's Wonderful World of Color - Additional Voices
- Wheelie and the Chopper Bunch - Hi-Riser
- Yo Yogi! - Max the Mole
- Yogi's Gang - Smokestack Smog
- Yogi's Space Race - Additional Voices
- Yogi's Treasure Hunt - Additional Voices

=== Live-action television ===
- The Red Skelton Show (1959) (Season 8 Episode 20: "Humphrey School of Dramatic Arts") as Ronnie
- Alfred Hitchcock Presents (1960-1962)
  - (Season 5 Episode 31: "I Can Take Care of Myself") (1960) as Amos
  - (Season 6 Episode 12: "The Baby-Blue Expression") (1960) as Harry
  - (Season 7 Episode 25: "The Last Remains") (1962) as Stanley
- The Dick Van Dyke Show (1961-1965)
  - (Season 1 Episode 14: "Buddy, Can You Spare a Job?") (1961) as Jackie Brewster
  - (Season 2 Episode 24: "The Sam Pomerantz Scandals") (1963) as Danny Brewster
  - (Season 4 Episode 16: "The Impractical Joke") (1965) as Phil Franklin
- Don't Call Me Charlie! (1962) (Season 1 Episode 9: "Who Stole My Boots?") as a Shoemaker
- The Twilight Zone (1963) (Season 4 Episode 8: "Miniature") - Buddy Russell
- My Favorite Martian (1964) (Season 1 Episode 37: "Uncle Martin's Wisdom Tooth") as Dentist Dr. Herbie Little
- The Munsters (1964) (Season 1 Episode 11: "The Midnight Ride of Herman Munster") - Freddie
- The Man From U.N.C.L.E. (1966) (Season 3 Episode 10: "The Off-Broadway Affair") as Winky Blintz
- Laredo (1966) (Season 2 Episode 8: "The Sweet Gang") as Bud Sweet
- The Red Skelton Show (1967) (Season 16 Episode 32: "The Nag and I") as CBS Hiring Manager
- Adam-12 (1973-1974)
  - (Season 5 Episode 17: "The Beast") (1973) as Tony, a Police garage mechanic
  - (Season 6 Episode 14: "The Sweet Smell") (1974) as Tony, a Police garage mechanic
- Emergency! (1974) (Season 4 Episode 11: "Firehouse Four") as Fred Gibson
- The Waltons (1974) (Season 3 Episode 10: "The Marathon") as Spanky
- Happy Days (1974) (Season 1 Episode 3: "Richie's Cup Runneth Over") as Duke
- The Krofft Supershow (1977) (16 episodes) as Magic Mondo in the "Magic Mongo" segment

=== Films ===
- Tales of Terror (1962) - Policeman (segment "The Black Cat")
- The Thrill of It All (1963) - Truck Driver
- It's a Mad, Mad, Mad, Mad World (1963) - F-14 / Ladder Fireman (voice, uncredited)
- Not with My Wife, You Don't! (1966) - Green Eyed Monster of Jealousy (voice, uncredited)
- Out of Sight (1966, Director)
- Good Times (1967) - Leslie Garth
- Gas! -Or- It Became Necessary to Destroy the World in Order to Save It. (1970) - (voice, uncredited)
- The Point! (1971) - Count (voice)
- Bedknobs and Broomsticks (1971) - Secretary Bird / King Leonidas (voice)
- Yogi's Ark Lark (1972) - Cap'n Noah Smitty
- The Adventures of Robin Hoodnik (1972) - Robin Hoodnik / Alan Airedale / Whirlin' Merlin / Lord Scurvy / Friar Pork / Little John (voice)
- Tabitha and Adam and the Clown Family (1972) - Big Louie / Count Krumley / Mr. McGuffin (voice)
- The Magical Mystery Trip Through Little Red's Head (1974) - Timer / All Other Voices (voice)
- Rikki-Tikki-Tavi (1975, TV Short) - Darzee the Tailorbird
- The Strongest Man in the World (1975) - State Coach
- Shogun Assassin (1980) - (voice)
- Bugs Bunny's 3rd Movie: 1001 Rabbit Tales (1982) - Prince Abadaba (voice)
- The Adventures of Ronald McDonald: McTreasure Island (1990, Short) - Grimace / The Captain / Pirates (voice)

=== Commercials ===
- McDonald's McDonaldland Commercials - Grimace (1971-1986) / Uncle O'Grimacey (voice)
- Time for Timer - Timer
- Cookie Crisp - Cookie Jarvis
- Super Friends - network promo "Meet... Super-Friends!" narrator for series premiere on ABC-TV September 1973
