= Wild on the Beach =

1965 film by Maury Dexter

- Directed by: Maury Dexter
- Written by: Harry Spalding
- Based on: story by Hank Tani
- Produced by: Maury Dexter
- Starring: Frankie Randall; Sherry Jackson; Gayle Caldwell [ackie Miller
- Cinematography: Jacques R. Marquette
- Edited by: Jodie Copelan
- Music by: Jimmie Haskell
- Production company: Lippert Productions
- Distributed by: Twentieth Century Fox Film Corporation
- Release date: August 25, 1965
- Running time: 77 min
- Country: United States
- Language: English

Wild on the Beach is a 1965 American beach party film directed by Maury Dexter and starring Frankie Randall, Sherry Jackson, Gayle Caldwell, and Jackie Miller. It was written by Harry Spalding based on a story by Hank Tani. It is notable for the musical acts showcased onscreen, including the film debut of Sonny & Cher. It is one of the few films in the genre to be filmed in black and white.

Although some sources state that the film was also released under the title Beach House Party, to date no prints or posters have surfaced with such a title. The RCA single "Yellow Haired Woman," by Frankie Randall (RCA Victor – 45-8587) refers to the movie being titled "Wild Beach Weekend."

== Plot ==
Co-ed Lee Sullivan, a student at an unnamed California college, inherits a house on the beach from her late uncle. She wants to use the building as a boarding house for girls, thus both alleviating the student housing shortage and financing her education.

Meanwhile, Adam Miller plans to turn the beach house into a boys' boarding house, claiming that he received permission to do so while Lee's uncle was still alive. Adam secretly files first for an off-campus housing permit, and the boys take up residence in the house. Lee also receives a permit, and naturally, problems develop when both male and female students decide to co-habitate – this administrative mix-up also makes for much ducking and dodging of the university authorities.

In spite of being at odds with each other, a romance blossoms between Lee and Adam.

== Cast ==
- Frankie Randall as Adam Miller
- Sherry Jackson as Lee Sullivan
- Gayle Caldwell as Marsie Lowell
- Jackie Miller as Toby Carr
- Russ Bender as Shep Kirby
- Booth Colman as Dean Parker
- Cindy Malone as herself
- Justin Smith as Mort Terwilliger
- Jerry Grayson as Vern Thompkins
- Marc Seaton as Jim Bench
- Robert Golden as policeman
- Larry Gust as Josh
- Sonny & Cher as themselves
- The Astronauts as themselves

== Production notes ==
After making 1963's The Young Swingers and 1964's Surf Party, this was director/producer Maury Dexter's third teen flick – and second effort to imitate AIP's Beach Party formula. AIP would later hire Dexter to direct Maryjane and The Mini-Skirt Mob.

Dexter has said that casting Sonny and Cher was the idea of Fred Roos.

While promoted as a standard beach party film with posters showing most of the female stars in bikinis and a title song with the lyrics "...only two steps down to the nearest wave, and surf's up every night!", no one in the cast actually wears swimsuits in the film, nor do any of them do anything on the beach – except walk on it – fully clothed. In fact, Frankie Randall, the male lead, wears a windbreaker on top of his shirt for most of the film.

Although little surfing is shown in the film apart from a few random insert shots of extras on surfboards, the "surfing coordinator" for Wild on the Beach was Phil Sauer, who had also worked on AIP's Muscle Beach Party and Bikini Beach (both 1964); Beach Blanket Bingo and How to Stuff a Wild Bikini (both 1965); as well as Columbia's Ride the Wild Surf (1964).

Dexter also used the Boulder, Colorado-based surf band The Astronauts in Surf Party.

== Music ==
- Jimmie Haskell composed the score and co-wrote two songs; associate producer "By" Dunham received a writing credit for six songs in the film.
- Frankie Randall performs two songs, "The House on the Beach" and "The Gods of Love" (both written by Bobby Beverly and By Dunham).
- The Astronauts perform four songs in the film: the rockabilly "Rock This World" (written by Beverly and Dunham), and the three surf tunes "Little Speedy Gonzalez" (written by Stan Ross and Beverly), "Pyramid Stomp" (written by Haskell and Dunham), and "Snap It" (written by Haskell)
- Sonny & Cher (backed by The Astronauts) sing "It's Gonna Rain" (written by Sonny Bono), and Jackie & Gayle sing "Winter Nocturne" (written by Eddie Davis and Dunham).
- Cindy Malone sings "Run Away from Him" (written by Beverly and Dunham); Russ Bender sings the country & western song "Yellow Haired Woman" (written by Eddie Davis and Dunham); and Sandy Nelson performs "Drum Dance" (written by Joe Saraceno and Frank Warren).

== Critical reception ==
Boxoffice wrote: "A raucous, swinging teenaged musical featuring several popular recording groups, this Maury Dexter production will please the young audiences for which it is intended but appeal will be strictly limited to these groups. Frankie Randall, Jackie and Gayle, The Astronauts, Sonny and Cher, Cindy Malone, Sandy Nelson and others less well known are among the performers who sing and surf against a California background. Excepting ingenue Sherry Jackson who does well in her non-singing role, none of the leading performers has had any previous acting experience and their fledgling efforts are apparent. Fortunately, there is little in the way of plot and most of the time is consumed with the 11 featured songs."

Chidester, and Priore wrote in Pop Surf Culture: Music, Design, Film, and Fashion from the Bohemian Surf Boom: "The third (and last) of Maury Dexter's Beach Party rip-offs, Wild on the Beach is so third-rate and low-budget that an unintentional sense of 'realism' creeps into it."

== See also ==
- List of American films of 1965
