= Frankie Randall (singer) =

American singer, pianist (1938–2014)

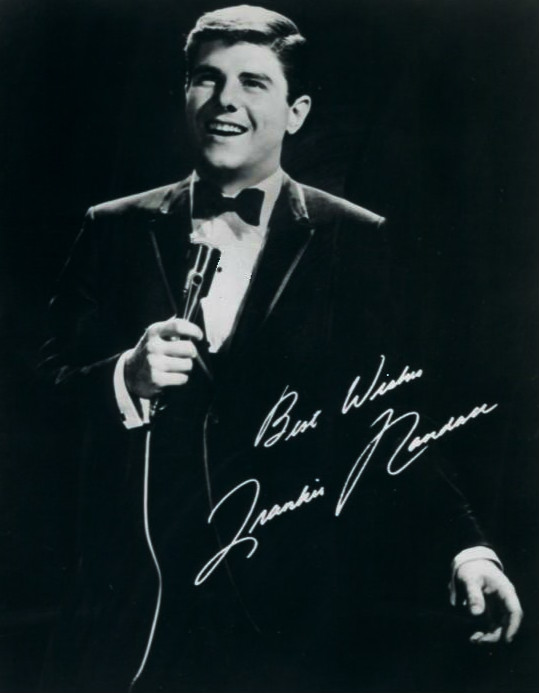
- Randall in 1966
- Born: Franklin Joseph Lisbona; January 11, 1938; Passaic, New Jersey, U.S.
- Died: December 28, 2014 (aged 76); Indio, California, U.S.
- Occupations: Singer; pianist
- Children: 5

Frankie Randall (born Franklin Joseph Lisbona; January 11, 1938 – December 28, 2014) was an American singer and pianist.

== Career ==
In 1964, Randall starred in Wild on the Beach and appeared in The Day of the Wolves (1971). He also appeared many times on the Dean Martin TV show, and hosted the summer version of the show when Martin was not available. He released dozens of RCA singles and albums from the 1960s onwards. After starting out in pop music, Randall, a piano player, began performing material from The Great American Songbook.

His version of the song "I Can See for Miles" by The Who is included in Rhino Records' album Golden Throats: The Great Celebrity Sing Off.

=== Accolades ===
In 2001, a Golden Palm Star on the Palm Springs, California, Walk of Stars was dedicated to Randall .

He got inducted into the Las Vegas Casino Legends Hall of Fame in October 2002.

He was presented the Amadeus Award by the Desert Symphony on January 11, 2013.

== Personal life ==
Randall was born Franklin Joseph Lisbona in Passaic, New Jersey on January 11, 1938.

Randall had five children.

On December 28, 2014, Randall died of lung cancer in Indio, California at the age of 76.

== Discography ==
- Relax'n With Chico Randall (Roulette, 1960)
- Frankie Randall Sings & Swings (RCA Victor, 1964)
- Frankie Randall At It Again! (RCA Victor, 1965)
- Going The Frankie Randall Way! (RCA Victor, 1966)
- I Remember You (RCA Victor, 1966)
- The Mods & The Pops (RCA Victor, 1968)
