= Winter A-Go-Go =

1965 American comedy-drama film

- Theatrical release poster
- Directed by: Richard Benedict
- Screenplay by: Bob Kanter
- Story by: Reno Carell
- Produced by: Reno Carell
- Starring: James Stacy; William Wellman Jr. Beverly Adams; John Anthony Hayes; Jill Donohue; Tom Nardini; Duke Hobbie; Julie Parrish; Buck Holland; Linda Rogers; Nancy Czar
- Cinematography: Jacques R. Marquette
- Edited by: Irving Berlin
- Music by: Harry Betts
- Production companies: Columbia Pictures; R. C. Productions
- Distributed by: Columbia Pictures
- Release date: October 28, 1965
- Running time: 88 minutes
- Country: United States
- Language: English

Winter A-Go-Go is a 1965 American comedy-drama film directed by Richard Benedict and starring James Stacy, William Wellman Jr., Beverly Adams, John Anthony Hayes, Jill Donohue, Tom Nardini, Duke Hobbie, Julie Parrish, Buck Holland, Linda Rogers, and Nancy Czar. The film was released by Columbia Pictures on October 28, 1965.

== Plot ==
A teenage ski bum and his friend tries to turn the lodge he's inherited into a music club.

== Cast ==
- James Stacy as Danny Frazer
- William Wellman Jr. as Jeff Forrester
- Beverly Adams as Jo Ann Wallace
- John Anthony Hayes as Burt
- Bob Kanter as Roger
- Jill Donohue as Janine
- Tom Nardini as Frankie
- Duke Hobbie as Bob
- Julie Parrish as Dee Dee
- Buck Holland as Will
- Linda Rogers as Penny
- Nancy Czar as Gloria 'Jonesy' Jones
- Judy Parker as Dori
- Walter Maslow as Jordan
- Peter Brinkman as himself
- H.T. Tsiang as Cholly
- Carey Foster as Winter-A-Go-Go Girl
- Arlene Charles as Winter-A-Go-Go Girl
- Cheryl Hurley as Winter-A-Go-Go Girl
- Cherie Foster as Winter-A-Go-Go Girl
- Joni Lyman as herself

== Production ==
Mike Frankovich of Columbia Pictures saw A Swingin' Summer (1965) and told producer Reno Carell he would distribute a follow-up using that film's stars, James Stacy and William Wellman Jr. The film was shot under the title A Swingin' Winter and used females under contract to Columbia. It was shot in Heavenly Valley on Lake Tahoe, and in the Eldorado National Forest.

Filming finished by early April 1965.

== Release ==
The film was profitable for Columbia but not significantly so and the beach party cycle soon came to an end.

Variety called it "a disappointing teenpic despite some occasional comic touches, good ski-country lensing, and talent glimmers among the younger players. Script doesn't take off until half-time, too late. Tunes and terp scenes flag what little pace exists. Reno Carell production is not up to standards of his earlier A Swingin’ Summer and seems destined for lowercase Columbia release in youth situations."

Filmink said "This is a bright, energetic film with an unfortunate comic Chinese cook, decent ski footage and a wedding at the end."

In August 1965 it was announced Stacy and Wellman would star in Fort Bikini for Carell but the film was not made.

== Notes ==
- Lisanti, Tom (2015). Hollywood Surf and Beach Movies: The First Wave, 1959-1969. McFarland.
