= Phyllis Diller =

American comedian and actress (1917–2012)

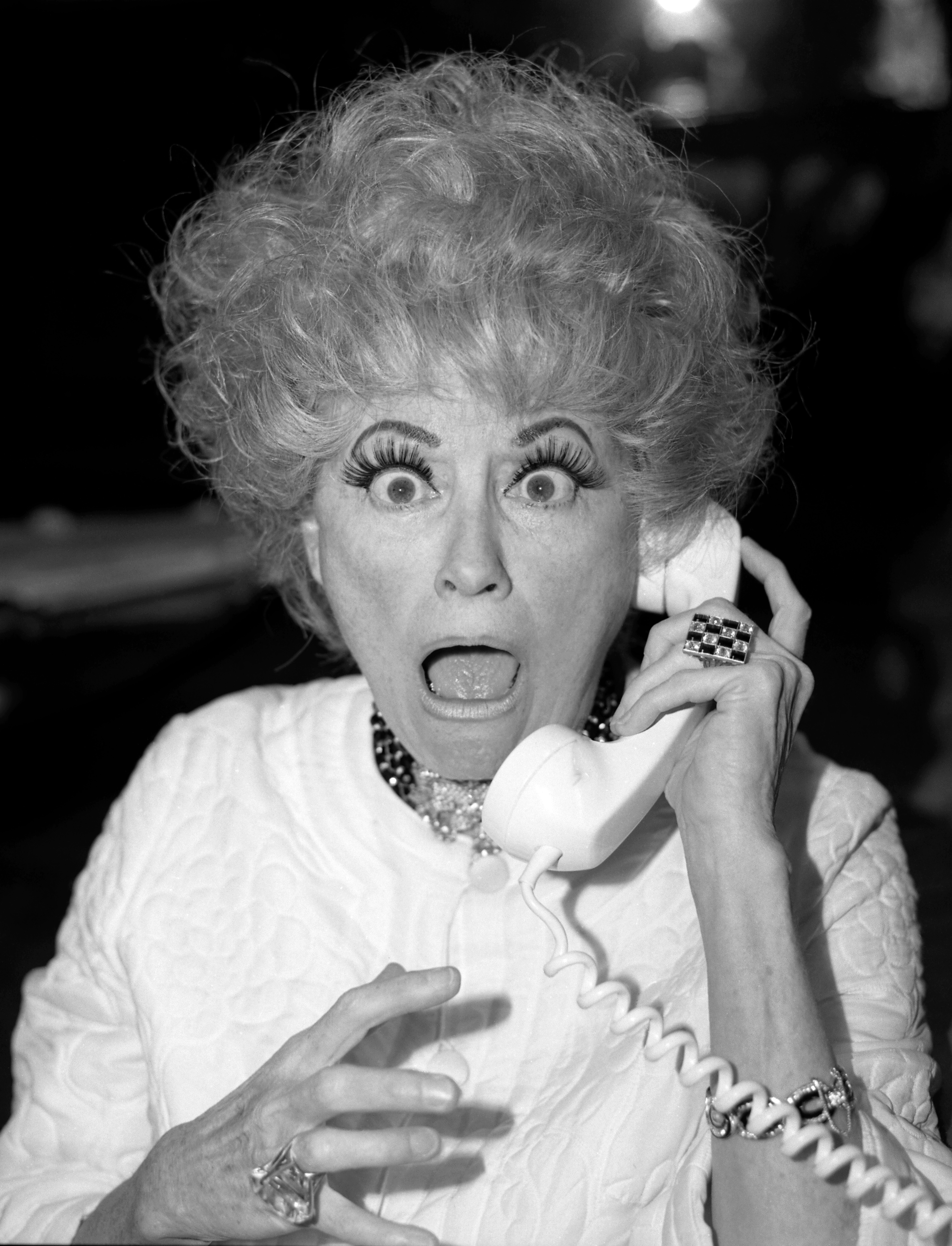
- Diller in 1973, photo by Allan Warren
- Born: Phyllis Ada Driver; July 17, 1917; Lima, Ohio, U.S.
- Died: August 20, 2012 (aged 95); Los Angeles, California, U.S.
- Education: Sherwood Music School; Bluffton College
- Spouses: Sherwood Anderson Diller (m. 1939; div. 1965) Warde Donovan Tatum (m. 1965; div. 1975)
- Partner: Robert P. Hastings (c. 1985–1996; his death)
- Children: 6

Comedy career
- Years active: 1939–2012
- Medium: Stand-up, film, television, books
- Genres: Insult comedy, observational comedy, musical comedy, improvisational comedy
- Subjects: American culture, self-deprecation, everyday life, religion, current events

Phyllis Ada Diller (née Driver; July 17, 1917 – August 20, 2012) was an American stand-up comedian, actress, author, musician and visual artist, noted for her eccentric stage persona, characterized by her self-deprecating humor, wild hair and clothes, and exaggerated, cackling laugh.

Diller was one of the first female comics to become a household name in the United States, credited as an influence by Joan Rivers, Roseanne Barr and Ellen DeGeneres, among others. She was also one of the first celebrities to openly champion plastic surgery, for which she was recognized by the cosmetic surgery industry.

Diller contributed to more than 40 films, beginning with Splendor in the Grass (1961). She appeared in many television series, featuring in numerous cameos as well as her own short-lived sitcom and variety show. Some of her credits include Night Gallery, The Muppet Show, CHiPs, The Love Boat, Cybill and Boston Legal, plus 11 seasons of The Bold and the Beautiful. Her voice-acting roles included the monster's wife in Mad Monster Party?, the Queen in A Bug's Life, Granny Neutron in The Adventures of Jimmy Neutron: Boy Genius, and Thelma Griffin in Family Guy.

== Early life ==
Diller was born Phyllis Ada Driver in Lima, Ohio on July 17, 1917, the only child of Perry Marcus Driver, an insurance agent, and Frances Ada (née Romshe). She had German and Irish ancestry (the surname "Driver" had been changed from "Treiber" several generations earlier). She was raised Methodist but was a lifelong atheist, even in childhood. Her father and mother were older than most when she was born (55 and 36, respectively) and Diller attended several funerals while growing up. The exposure to death at a young age led her to an early appreciation for life and she later realized that her comedy was a form of therapy.

Diller attended Lima's Central High School, discovering early on she had comic gifts. Later, Diller observed, "I was always a pro— even as a little tiny kid. I was an absolutely perfect, quiet, dedicated student in class. But outside of class, I got my laughs." Diller studied piano for three years at the Sherwood Music Conservatory but decided against a career in music after hearing her teachers and mentors play with much more skill than she thought that she would be able to achieve, and transferred to Bluffton College where she studied literature, history, psychology and philosophy.

== Career ==
=== 1930s–1950s ===
In 1939 she met Sherwood Diller, the brother of a classmate at Bluffton, and they eloped, marrying in Bluffton on November 4, 1939. Diller did not finish college and was primarily a homemaker, taking care of their five children (a sixth child died in infancy).

During World War II, Sherwood worked at the Willow Run B-24 Bomber Plant, in Ypsilanti Charter Township, Michigan. In 1945, Sherwood Diller was transferred to Naval Air Station Alameda Alameda, California, where he was an inspector.

Diller began working as the women's editor at a small newspaper, and as an advertising copywriter for an Oakland department store.

In 1952, Diller began working in broadcasting at KROW radio in Oakland, California. In November of that year, she filmed several 15-minute episodes of Phyllis Dillis, the Homely Friendmaker—dressed in a housecoat to offer absurd "advice" to homemakers. The 15-minute series was a Bay Area Radio-Television production, directed for television by ABC's Jim Baker. Diller also worked as a copywriter and, later, director of promotion and marketing at KSFO radio in San Francisco, and as a vocalist for a music-review TV show called Pop Club, hosted by Don Sherwood.

"It took two years of nagging by my husband to get me onto that stage," she (Diller) told Nachman. Finally, she said, she "sat down, called the Red Cross and said, 'I have an act. Where do you want it?' They sent me to the veterans hospital at the Presidio, where I pushed a piano into a room that had four guys in it. I played, sang, told jokes while they yelled, 'Leave us alone; we're already in pain!'

At age 37, on March 7, 1955, at the North Beach, San Francisco basement club, The Purple Onion, she made her professional stand-up debut. Up until then, she had only tried out her jokes for fellow PTA members at nearby Edison Elementary School. Maya Angelou, who was already performing at the club, wrote that Diller "would not change her name because when she became successful she wanted everyone to know it was, indeed, her herself". Her first professional show was a success and the two-week booking stretched out to a record 89 consecutive weeks. Diller had found her calling and eventual financial success while her husband's business career failed. She explained, "I became a stand-up comedian because I had a sit-down husband."

In a 1986 NPR interview, Diller said she had no idea what she was doing when she started playing clubs, and in the beginning she never saw another woman on the comedy circuit. With no female role models in a male-dominated industry, she initially used props and drew from her educational and work background as a basis for satire, spoofing classical music concerts and advice columns. She wrote her own material and kept a file cabinet full of her gags, honing her nightclub act. Sid Caesar, Milton Berle and Jonathan Winters were early influences, but Diller developed a singular comedic persona — a surreal version of femininity. This absurd caricature with garish baggy dresses and gigantic, clownish hair made fun of her lack of sex appeal while brandishing a cigarette holder (with a wooden cigarette because she didn't smoke), punctuating the humor with a hearty cackle to show she was in on the joke. At the time, Diller said, "They had no idea what I was. It was like—'Get a stick and kill it before it multiplies!'"

Her first national television appearance was as a contestant on Groucho Marx's quiz show You Bet Your Life in 1958. Multiple bookings on the Jack Paar Tonight Show led to an appearance on The Ed Sullivan Show, which brought her national prominence as she continued to perform stand-up throughout the United States.

Starting in 1959 and throughout the 1960s, she released multiple comedy albums, including the titles Wet Toe in a Hot Socket!, Laughs, Are You Ready for Phyllis Diller?, and The Beautiful Phyllis Diller.

=== 1960s ===
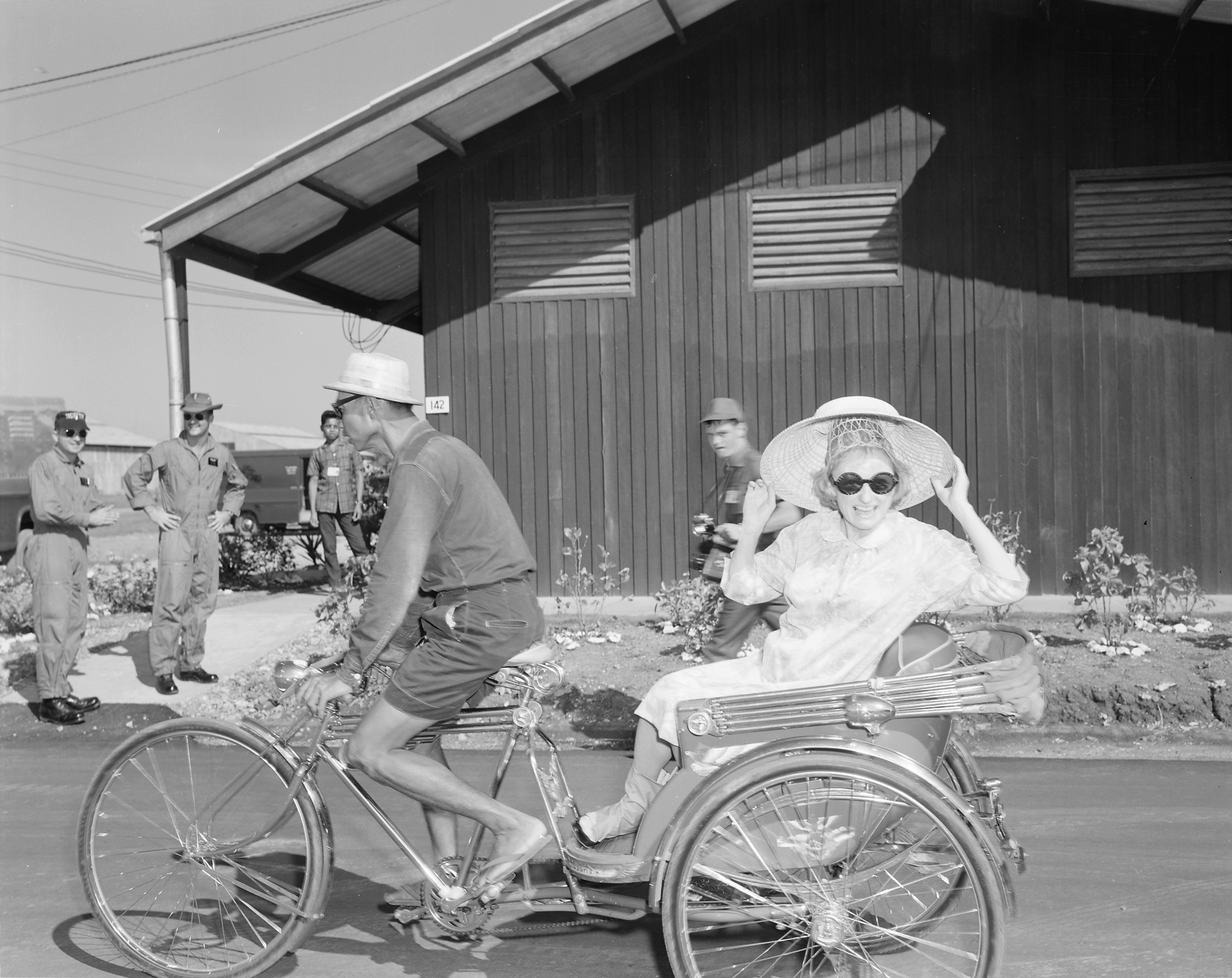
Diller at Korat Royal Thai Air Force Base, Thailand, 1966

From 1961 to 1965, Phyllis Diller lived in Webster Groves, Missouri, a suburb of St. Louis. Several of her children had stayed with Sherwood's relatives in St. Louis, and the oldest, Peter, attended Washington University.

In the early 1960s, Diller performed at the Bon Soir in Greenwich Village, where an up-and-coming Barbra Streisand was her opening act. She was offered film work and became famous after co-starring with her mentor Bob Hope, who described her as "a Warhol mobile of spare parts picked up along a freeway." They worked together in films such as Boy, Did I Get a Wrong Number! (1966), Eight on the Lam (1967), and The Private Navy of Sgt. O'Farrell (1968), all critically panned, but did well at the box office. Diller accompanied Hope to Vietnam in 1966 with his USO troupe near the height of the Vietnam War.

She appeared regularly as a special guest on many television programs including The Andy Williams Show. She was a Mystery Guest on What's My Line? but the blindfolded panel (including Sammy Davis Jr.) discerned Diller's identity in three guesses. Diller made regular cameo appearances, making her trademark wisecracks on Rowan & Martin's Laugh-In. Noted for her self-deprecating humor, Diller's typical joke repertoire included one in which she ran after a garbage truck pulling away from her curb. "Am I too late for the trash?" she would yell. The driver's reply: "No, jump right in!" She became a semi-regular on The Hollywood Squares, starting in 1967, appearing in 28 episodes until 1980.

Diller continued to work in film, making an appearance as Texas Guinan, the wisecracking nightclub hostess in Splendor in the Grass (1961). Throughout the 1960s, she appeared in more than a dozen, usually low-budget, films. She also began a career in voice work, providing the voice of the Monster's Mate in Mad Monster Party? (1967).

Diller also starred in the short-lived television series The Pruitts of Southampton (1966–1967); later retitled The Phyllis Diller Show, a half-hour sitcom on ABC. She received a Golden Globe nomination in 1967 for her role in Pruitts. Diller hosted a variety show in 1968 titled The Beautiful Phyllis Diller Show.

Beginning December 26, 1969, she had a three-month run in Hello, Dolly! (opposite Richard Deacon), as the second to last in a succession of replacements for Carol Channing in the title role, which included Ginger Rogers, Martha Raye, Betty Grable, and Pearl Bailey. After Diller's stint, Ethel Merman took over the role until the end of the show's run in December 1970.

=== 1970–2012 ===
Diller in 1973

Diller continued working in television throughout the 1970s and 1980s, appearing as a judge on premiere and subsequent episodes of The Gong Show and as a panelist on the Match Game PM show. She also guest-starred in The Mouse Factory, Night Gallery, Love American Style, The Muppet Show, CHiPs and The Love Boat. In 1978, she hosted a Showtime comedy special which featured Robin Tyler, who became the first out lesbian on U.S. national television. Between 1999 and 2003, she played roles in 7th Heaven and The Drew Carey Show.

Her successful career as a voice actor continued when Diller guested as herself in "A Good Medium is Rare," a 1972 episode of The New Scooby-Doo Movies. In 1998, Diller provided the voice of the Queen in A Bug's Life. Among her other animated films are The Nutcracker Prince (1990, as Mousequeen), Happily Ever After (1990, as Mother Nature), and Casper's Scare School (2006, as Aunt Spitzy).

She voiced characters in several television series, including Robot Chicken, Family Guy, Wait Till Your Father Gets Home, Captain Planet, Cow and Chicken, Hey Arnold! as Arnold's grandpa's sister Mitzi, The Powerpuff Girls, Animaniacs, Jimmy Neutron as Jimmy's grandmother, The Wild Thornberrys and King of the Hill. She also played Peter Griffin's mother, Thelma, on Family Guy in 2006.

=== Retirement ===
Citing advanced age and a lack of "lasting energy," Diller retired from stand-up in 2002. Her final performance was at the Suncoast that year in Las Vegas, Nevada. At the time she stated, "If you can't dance to comedy, forget it. It's music." The 2004 documentary Goodnight, We Love You: The Life and Legend of Phyllis Diller, directed by Gregg Barson, was shot on the night of her last performance. It follows Diller to a press conference, backstage, and into her home, to cover the story of her career. Rip Taylor, Don Rickles, Roseanne Barr, Red Buttons, Jo Anne Worley and Lily Tomlin are featured, discussing Diller's comedy legacy.

Although retired from the stand-up circuit, Diller never fully left the entertainment industry. In 2005, she was featured as one of many contemporary comics in the documentary The Aristocrats. Diller, who avoided blue comedy, did a version of an old, risqué vaudeville routine, in which she describes herself passing out when she first heard the joke, forgetting the actual content of the joke.

On January 24, 2007, Diller appeared on The Tonight Show and performed stand-up before chatting with Jay Leno. Leno has stated that Diller would infrequently call him to contribute jokes during his time as the host of The Tonight Show. That same year, she had a cameo appearance portraying herself in an episode of Boston Legal. In 2011, she appeared in an episode of her friend Roseanne Barr's reality show Roseanne's Nuts.

In January 2012, she recorded a version of Charlie Chaplin's song "Smile" with Pink Martini's Thomas Lauderdale for the album Get Happy.

=== Author ===
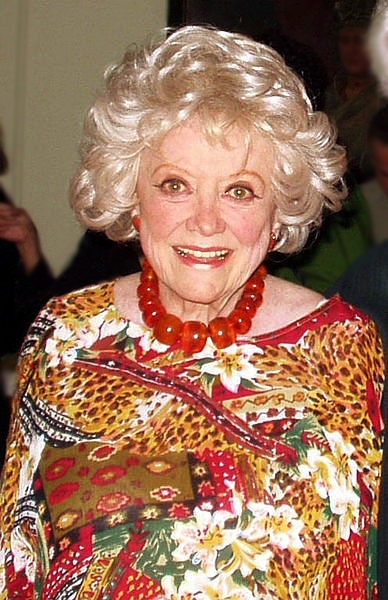
Diller in February 2007

Publishing her first best seller in 1966 and releasing more throughout the decade, Diller's books on domestic life featured her self-deprecating humor. The titles include Phyllis Diller's Housekeeping Hints, Phyllis Diller's Marriage Manual, and The Complete Mother. In 1981, she published The Joys of Aging & How to Avoid Them.

Her autobiography, Like a Lampshade in a Whorehouse – My Life in Comedy, co-written with Richard Buskin, was published in 2006. In it, Diller told of an unhappy childhood with undemonstrative, emotionally withholding parents, and an equally unhappy first marriage. From these beginnings, her performing style—telling rapid-fire jokes—emerged, which she compared to music: "One joke followed the other with a flow and a rhythm. ... Everything had a natural feel to it."

In the early 1990s, Diller had many short, humorous pieces published in Ellery Queen's Mystery Magazine.

=== Musician ===
Diller had studied the piano for many years and was an accomplished pianist but decided against a career in music after hearing her teachers and mentors play with much more skill than she thought that she would be able to achieve. She still played in her private life, however, and owned a custom-made harpsichord.

Between 1971 and 1981, Diller appeared as a piano soloist with symphony orchestras across the country under the stage name Dame Illya Dillya. Her performances were spiced with humor, but she took the music seriously. A review of one of her concerts in The San Francisco Examiner called her "a fine concert pianist with a firm touch."

=== Artist ===
A self-taught artist, Diller began painting in 1963. She worked in acrylics, watercolors, and oils throughout the 1970s and filled her Brentwood, California home with her portraits and still lifes. In 2003, at age 86, she held the first of several "art parties", selling her artwork along with her stage clothes and costume jewelry.

== Personal life ==
Diller credited much of her success to a motivational book, The Magic of Believing (1948) by Claude M. Bristol, which gave her confidence at the start of her career. She was married and divorced twice. She had six children with her first husband Sherwood Anderson Diller, and she outlived two of her grown children.

Diller's second husband was actor Warde Donovan, whom she married on October 7, 1965. She filed for divorce three months later, after discovering Donovan was bisexual and an alcoholic, but they reconciled on the day before the divorce was to become final. The couple divorced in 1975. Robert P. Hastings was her partner from 1985 until his death on May 23, 1996. In a 2000 interview, she called him the love of her life, saying that he admired her for being an independent person. The character of "Fang", the husband whom she frequently mentioned in her act, sprang from an appropriation of elements of the comic strip The Lockhorns.

Diller portrayed herself as a horrible cook in her stand-up routines, but she was reputed to be an excellent cook. She licensed her recipe for chili and sold it nationally as "Phyllis Diller Chili".

Diller candidly discussed her plastic surgery, a series of procedures first undertaken when she was 55, and she wrote that she had undergone 15 procedures. Her numerous surgeries were the subject of a 20/20 segment on February 12, 1993.

== Illness and death ==
By 1997, as she passed her 80th birthday, Diller began to suffer from various ailments. In 1999, her heart stopped during a hospital stay. She was fitted with a pacemaker but had a bad drug reaction and became paralyzed. Through physical therapy, she was able to walk again. Approaching age 90, Diller retired from stand-up comedy appearances.

On July 11, 2007, USA Today reported that she had fractured her back and had to cancel an appearance on The Tonight Show, during which she had planned to celebrate her 90th birthday. On May 15, 2012, Diller conducted her final interview accepting the "Lifetime Achievement" award from her hometown of Lima, Ohio, as part of a panel of comedians.

Diller died at home in the Brentwood neighborhood of Los Angeles on August 20, 2012, at age 95, from heart failure. She was cremated, and her ashes were scattered at sea.

== Influence and legacy ==
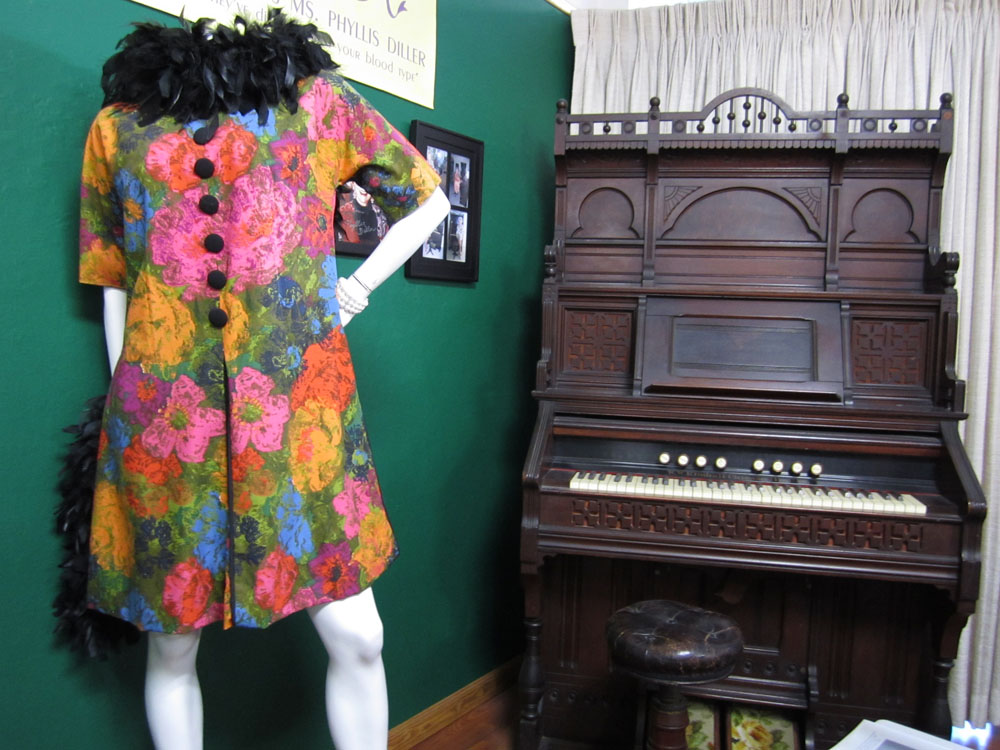
One of Diller's self-designed costumes and her pump organ at the Alameda Museum, California, 2015.

Diller was one of the first solo female comedians in the U.S. to become a household name. She stated that making people laugh is a powerful art form. As a pioneering woman in the stand-up field, she inspired many female comedians including Joan Rivers, Lily Tomlin, Ellen DeGeneres, Margaret Cho and Roseanne Barr. Diller herself was influenced by comedy books and appropriated from sources like The Lockhorns.

Barr, who listened to Diller's records as a child, called her a true artist and revolutionary, saying, "It was timeless, that wacky, tacky character she created; the cigarette holder was genius, paradoxically regal. She was a victorious loser hero, the female iteration of Chaplin's Little Tramp."

Fellow comic Joan Rivers paid tribute to Diller's early-career woman's point of view, saying, "She was the first one that there was such rage and such anger in her comedy. She had the anger that is now in all of us. And that's what made it so funny because she spoke for all these women that were sitting home with five children and a husband that didn't work."

Diller had a large gay following from the beginning of her career, once saying, "My first audience were gay people because they have a great sense of humor." An obituary in Queerty noted her popularity with gay audiences, calling her a "strong-willed entertainer who challenged the status quo regarding gender and sexuality." She enjoyed the company of gay men, writing in her memoir, Like a Lampshade in a Whorehouse: My Life in Comedy: "Gay men have the most wonderful sense of humor. And they are willing to laugh. They appeal to me and I appeal to them." In 2021, Ginger Minj portrayed Diller in the Snatch Game of Love on the sixth season of RuPaul's Drag Race All Stars.

A New York Times remembrance noted that Diller's flamboyant look is echoed in Lady Gaga's concert attire and that Eddie Murphy also punctuated jokes with a loud laugh, in a style reminiscent of Diller's persona.

Diller was an outspoken proponent of plastic surgery at a time when cosmetic procedures were secretive. Her public admission to having several facelifts, nose jobs and other procedures added promotional and comedic value to her act. She told Bob Hope in 1971 that she had had a facelift because "I got sick and tired of having the dog drag me out to the yard and bury me." The American Academy of Cosmetic Surgery gave her an award for bringing plastic surgery "out of the closet."

In 2003, after hearing of the donation of Archie Bunker's chair to the Smithsonian Institution, Diller opened her doors to the National Museum of American History. She offered them some of her most iconic costume pieces, as well as her gag file, a steel cabinet with 48 file drawers with more than 50,000 jokes she had written on index cards during her career. In 2011, the Albert H. Small Documents Gallery at the National Museum of American History displayed Diller's file and some of the objects that became synonymous with her comedic persona—an unkempt wig, wrist-length gloves, cloth-covered ankle boots, and a bejeweled cigarette holder.

== Portrayal ==
In 1999, Diller was played by Karri Turner in the JAG episode "Ghosts of Christmas Past" which took place Christmas Eve 1969.

== Awards and honors ==
- Honorary House mother, Alpha Epsilon Pi fraternity at UCLA, 1966
- Golden Apple Award for Most Cooperative Actress – 1966.
- Laurel Award for Female New Face 11th place – 1967.
- Golden Globe nomination for Actress in a Television Series – The Pruitts of Southampton – 1967.
- Awarded Star on the Hollywood Walk of Fame for her contribution to Television – January 15, 1975.
- Women's International Center Living Legacy Award – 1990.
- American Comedy Award for Lifetime Achievement – 1992.
- Diller lived in St. Louis with her family from 1961 to 1965 and was inducted into the St. Louis Walk of Fame in 1993.
- Daytime Emmy Award nomination for Outstanding Service Show Host – A Tribute to Bob Hope – 1998.
- Women in Film Lucy Award, recognizing her achievements in enhancing the perception of women through the medium of television – 2000.
- San Diego Film Festival Governor's Award – 2004.
- Scripps Howard MVP Award - 2009
- Lifetime Achievement Award from hometown Lima, Ohio – 2012.
- Diller's July 17 birthday is officially "Phyllis Diller Day" in Alameda, California, where she got her start in radio and television.

== Filmography ==
=== Film ===
Year	Title	Role	Notes
1961	Splendor in the Grass	Texas Guinan	film debut
1966	The Fat Spy	Camille Salamander	
1966	Boy, Did I Get a Wrong Number!	Lily	
1967	Mad Monster Party?	The Monster's Mate	Voice
1967	Eight on the Lam	Golda	
1968	The Private Navy of Sgt. O'Farrell	Nurse Nellie Krause	
1968	Did You Hear the One About the Traveling Saleslady?	Agatha Knabenshu	
1969	The Adding Machine	Mrs. Zero	
1975	The Sunshine Boys	Performer on Fictional Television Program	Uncredited
1977	The Great Balloon Race	unknown role	
1979	A Pleasure Doing Business	Mrs. Wildebeest	
1982	Pink Motel	Margaret	
1988	Doctor Hackenstein	Mrs. Trilling	
1989	Pucker Up and Bark Like a Dog	Mrs. Frasco	
1989	Happily Ever After	Mother Nature	Voice
1990	The Nutcracker Prince	The Mouse Queen	Voice
1991	The Boneyard	Miss Poopinplatz	
1991	Wisecracks	Herself	Documentary
1993	The Perfect Man	Mother	
1994	The Silence of the Hams	Old Secretary	
1997	Peoria Babylon	Painting Owner	
1998	A Bug's Life	Queen	Voice
1999	The Debtors	unknown role	
1999	The Nuttiest Nutcracker	Sugar Plum Fairy	Voice, Direct-to-Video
2000	Everything's Jake	Victoria Pond	
2002	The Last Place on Earth	Mrs. Baskin	
2002	Hip! Edgy! Quirky!	Mrs. Higgenbothen	
2004	Motocross Kids	Louise	
2004	West from North Goes South	The Cashier	
2005	The Aristocrats	Herself	
2006	Unbeatable Harold	Mrs. Clancy	
2006	Forget About It	Mrs. Hertzberg	
2008	Light of Olympia	Pelops	Voice
2009	The Hipsters	unknown role	
2009	Family Dinner	Grandma Liz O'Connell	Short; Uncredited

=== Television ===
Year	Title	Role	Notes
1958	You Bet Your Life	Herself (Nightclub Performer)	Episode: "#8.19"
1961–1970	The Ed Sullivan Show	Herself (Guest)	6 episodes
1963–1964	What's My Line?	Herself (Mystery Guest)	2 episodes
1964–1967	I've Got a Secret	Herself (Guest / Panelist)	4 episodes
1964–1967	Match Game	Herself (Team Captain)	20 episodes
1964–1971	The Bob Hope Show	Herself (Guest)	10 episodes
1965–1971	The Andy Williams Show	Herself (Guest)	5 episodes
1965–1974	The Dean Martin Show	Herself (Guest)	8 episodes
1966	Batman	Scrubwoman	Episode: "The Minstrel's Shakedown" uncredited
1966	The Red Skelton Hour	Clara Appleby	Episode: "Love at First Fright"
1966–1967	The Phyllis Diller Show	Phyllisa Pruitt	Series regular; 30 episodes
1966–1969	The Hollywood Palace	Herself (Host)	6 episodes
1967	The Carol Burnett Show	Herself (Guest)	Episode: "#1.6"
1967–1980	The Hollywood Squares	Herself (Panelist)	28 episodes
1968	The Red Skelton Hour	Greta Gargoyle	Episode: "Dial M for Moron"
1968	It Takes Two	Herself	Episode: "Pilot"
1968	The Beautiful Phyllis Diller Show	Herself (Host)	4 episodes
1968–1973	Rowan & Martin's Laugh-In	Herself (guest)	6 episodes
1969	The Red Skelton Hour	Bobo Van Beacon	Episode: "Beauty Is Only Skin Deep, Unless You're a Banana"
1969	That's Life	unknown role	Episode: "Chalk Can Be Sexy"
1969	Love, American Style	Daphanie Daniels	Episode: "Love and the Phonies"
1969	The Liberace Show	Herself (Guest)	Episode: "#5.23.1969"
1969	Get Smart	Maxwell Smart	Episode: "Pheasant Under Glass" (uncredited)
1969	The Good Guys	Lilli Resphighi	Episode: "No Orchids for the Diner"
1970	Swing Out, Sweet Land	Belva A. Lockwood	Television Movie
1970	The Mad, Mad, Mad Comedians	Herself	Voice, Television Movie
1971	Night Gallery	Pamela	Voice, episode: "Pamela's Voice"
1971	Love, American Style	Bella	Episode: "Love and the Heist"
1971	Love, American Style	Edna	Episode: "Love and the Vacation"
1971	The Reel Game	Herself (Celebrity Guest)	Episode: "#1.18.1971"
1971	The Red Skelton Hour	Herself (Killer Diller)	Episode: "Sheriff Hater"
1971	The Sonny & Cher Comedy Hour	Herself (Guest)	Episode: "#1.5"
1972	The New Scooby-Doo Movies	Herself	Voice, episode: "A Good Medium Is Rare"
1973	Wait Till Your Father Gets Home	Detective Phyllis Diller	Voice, episode: "The Lady Detective"
1973	Love, American Style	Sally Walker	Episode: "Love and the Comedienne"
1973	The Bobby Darin Show	Herself (Guest)	Episode: "#1.10"
1974	Tattletales	Herself	11 episodes
1974	Celebrity Roast	Herself	Episode: "Bob Hope/Telly Savalas"
1975	Uncle Croc's Block	Witchy Goo-Goo	Series regular; 16 episodes
1975	Celebrity Roast	Herself	Episode: "Lucille Ball/Jackie Gleason/Sammy Davis Jr./Michael Landon/Valerie Harper"
1976	The Gong Show	Herself (Guest Judge)	Episode: "Phyllis Diller"
1976	The Muppet Show	Herself (Special Guest Star)	Episode: "Phyllis Diller"
1977	The Bobby Vinton Show	Herself (Guest)	2 episodes
1978	America 2-Night	Herself (Guest)	Episode: "Phyllis Diller"
1978	CHiPs	Wanda	Episode: "Crack-Up"
1978	Comedy Roast	Herself	Episode: "Jack Klugman/George Burns/Betty White"
1979	The Love Boat	Viola Penny	Episode: "The Scoop/The Audit Couple/My Boyfriend's Back"
1980	Password Plus	Herself (Celebrity Contestant)	2 episodes
1981	Barbara Mandrell & the Mandrell Sisters	Herself	1 episode
1982	The Love Boat	Martha Morse	Episode: "The Anniversary Gift/Honey Bee Mine/Bewigged, Bothered and Bewildered"
1982	Madame's Place	Herself	Episode: "But Please, No Jokes"
1983	All-Star Family Feud Special	Herself (Celebrity Contestant)	Episode: "Richard's Rosebuds vs. Phyllis Fighters"
1984	As the World Turns	Fairy Godmother	Episode: "Cinderella Concert"
1984	Comedy Roast	Herself	Episode: "Joan Collins"
1984–1985	Body Language	Herself (Panelist)	15 episodes
1985	The Jeffersons	Herself	Episode: "You'll Never Get Rich"
1985	Tales from the Darkside	Nora Mills	Episode: "The Trouble with Mary Jane"
1985	Glitter	unknown role	Episode: "Rock 'n' Roll Heaven"
1987	Jonathan Winters: On the Ledge	Jonathan's Mother	Television film
1987	Alice Through the Looking Glass	The White Queen	Voice, television film
1987–1989	Super Password	Herself (Celebrity Contestant)	25 episodes
1988	Full House	Herself	Episode: "But Seriously, Folks"
1988	Night Heat	Mrs. Malik	Episode: "Better Part of Valor"
1989	Family Feud	Herself (Contestant)	Episode: "The Funny Men vs.the Funny Women"
1989	Hanna-Barbera's 50th: A Yabba Dabba Doo Celebration	Herself	Television film
1990	227	Louanne Costello	Episode: "The Class of '90"
1991	Captain Planet and the Planeteers	Dr. Jane Goodair	Voice, episode: "Smog Hog"
1992	Carol: Leifer: Gaudy, Bawdy & Blue	Herself	Television film
1993	Dream On	Mrs. Barish	Episode: "Oral Sex, Lies and Videotape"
1993–1994	Blossom	Mrs. Peterson/Herself	4 episodes
1994	Mrs. Piggle-Wiggle	unknown role	Episode: "The Never-Want-To-Go-To-Bedders Cure"
1994	Boy Meets World	Madame Ouspenkaya	Episode: "Who's Afraid of Cory Wolf?"
1996	Cybill	Herself	Uncredited, Episode: "Romancing the Crone"
1996–2012	The Bold and the Beautiful	Gladys Pope	recurring role; 18 episodes (final appearance)
1998	Animaniacs	Suzy Squirrel	Voice, episode: "The Sunshine Squirrels"
1998	Diagnosis Murder	Herself	Episode: "Talked to Death"
1998–1999	Emily of New Moon	Great Aunt Nancy Priest	2 episodes
1999	King of the Hill	Lillian	Voice, episode: "Escape from Party Island"
1999	Cow and Chicken	Red's Mom / Cop	Voice, episode: "Professor Longhorn Steer/I.M. Weasel: He Said, He Said/A Couple of Skating Fools"
1999	I Am Weasel	Red's Mother	Voice, episode: "I Am Artiste"
1999	The Wild Thornberrys	Samantha	Voice, episode: "Two's Company"
1999	Hey Arnold!	Mitzi Shortman	Voice, episode: "Grandpa's Sister"
1999	7th Heaven	Mabel	Episode: "Nobody Knows"
2000	Hollywood Off-Ramp	unknown role	Episode: "Unfunny Girl"
2001	Arli$	Herself	Episode: "As Others See Us"
2001	Kiss My Act	Herself	Television film
2001	The Test	Herself (Panelist)	Episode: "The Cajones Test"
2001–2002	Titus	Grandma Titus	2 episodes ("Grandma Titus" and "Houseboat")
2002	The Drew Carey Show	Bebe	Episode: "Look Mom, One Hand!"
2002	Even Stevens	Coach Korns	Episode: "Snow Job"
2002–2003	7th Heaven	Gabrielle	2 episodes
2002, 2004	The Adventures of Jimmy Neutron	Grandma Neutron	Voice, 2 episodes
2002, 2004	Hollywood Squares	Herself (Panelist)	recurring role; 30 episodes
2003	Life with Bonnie	Phyllis Frost	Episode: "It's a Wonderful Job"
2003	Star Dates	Herself	Episode: "Phyllis Diller"
2004	The Powerpuff Girls	Mask Scara	Voice, episode: "A Made Up Story"
2005	Quintuplets	Aunt Sylvia	Episode: "Chutes and Letters"
2005	Robot Chicken	Herself / Various	Voice, recurring role; 3 episodes
2006	Casper's Scare School	Aunt Spitzy	Voice, Television film
2006	Robot Chicken	Herself / Various	Voice, episode: "Easter Basket"
2006–2007	Family Guy	Thelma Griffin	Voice, 3 episodes
2007	Boston Legal	Herself	Episode: "Brotherly Love"
2011	Roseanne's Nuts	Herself	Episode: "Grannies Night Out"

=== Music videos ===
Year	Title	Artist(s)	Role	Ref.
2001	"Love You Madly"	Cake	Herself	

=== Video games ===
Year	Title	Voice
1996	You Don't Know Jack Volume 2	Herself

== Discography ==
=== Albums ===
Year	Title	Label	Format	Notes
1959	Wet Toe in a Hot Socket	Mirrosonic/London/Hallmark	vinyl/CD	with The Three Flames at the Bon Soir, CD reissued 2016
1961	Laughs	Verve	vinyl	at the Bon Soir NY March 1961
1962	Are You Ready for Phyllis Diller?	Verve	vinyl	produced by Jim Davis
1968	Born to Sing	Columbia	vinyl/streaming	produced by David Rubinson
2001	Live From San Francisco	Laugh.com	CD/streaming	recorded 2000
2009	On Comedy	Laugh.com	CD/streaming	interviewed by Kelly Carlin

=== Compilations ===
Year	Title	Label	Format	Notes
1964	Great Moments of Comedy	Verve	vinyl	Celebrity Series
1967	The Best of Phyllis Diller	Verve/Laugh.com	vinyl/CD/streaming	CD reissued 2002
1968	The Beautiful Phyllis Diller	Verve	vinyl/streaming	Celebrity Series, photography by Roddy McDowall
1968	What's Left	Verve	vinyl/CD	Celebrity Series

=== Home videos ===
Year	Title	Studio	Format
1977	On Location with Phyllis Diller	HBO/Standing Room Only	broadcast / DVD 2006
1987	How to Have a Moneymaking Garage Sale	J2 Communications	VHS
2001	Live in Concert	Laugh.com	DVD
2004	Goodnight, We Love You: The Life and Legend of Phyllis Diller	Mansfield Avenue Productions/Image Entertainment	theatrical / DVD 2006
2007	Not Just Another Pretty Face	MPI Media Group	DVD / streaming
