= List of Wait Till Your Father Gets Home episodes =

The following is a list of episodes of Wait Till Your Father Gets Home.

== Series overview ==
Season	Episodes	Originally released	
Season	Episodes	First released	Last released
1	24	September 12, 1972	February 20, 1973
2	20	September 11, 1973	January 29, 1974
3	4	September 17, 1974	October 8, 1974

== Episodes ==
=== Season 1 (1972–73) ===
All 24 episodes of the first season were directed by Peter Luschwitz.

No. overall	No. in season	Title	Written by	Storyboard by	Original release date	Prod. code
1	1	"The Fling"	Jack Elinson and Norman Paul	Paul Sommer	September 12, 1972	63-1
Restaurant-equipment dealer Harry Boyle is stranded with a female customer overnight, prompting everyone to think that he is cheating on his wife, Irma.
2	2	"Alice's Dress"	Jack Elinson and Norman Paul	Paul Sommer	September 19, 1972	63-2
Harry and his family get invited to a party held by Harry's boss, and Harry wants everyone in the family to act and dress their best -- which is easier said than done because Alice wants to wear a racy department-store dress with no bra, prompting Harry and Irma to worry about the influence that sex and sexuality in the media has on their daughter.
3	3	"The Hippie"	Mark Scott and Charles Anthony	Paul Sommer	September 26, 1972	63-3
Chet invites his hippie musician friend to stay with the Boyles. Harry tries different ways to get him to leave, including offering him a job and pretending to be a hippie himself.
4	4	"The Beach Vacation"	Pamela Chais	Charles McElmurry	October 3, 1972	63-4
The Boyles rent a beach house, but things get complicated when Alice wants to wear a string bikini and Harry must decide whether or not to press charges against a nude sunbather who will not leave his property.
5	5	"Help Wanted"	Jack Elinson and Norman Paul	Stan Walsh and Jim Pabian	October 10, 1972	63-5
Harry gets into trouble with special-interest groups when he fires his Jewish driver and must choose between hiring someone who is right for the job versus hiring someone in order to comply with the dictates of affirmative action and diversity.
6	6	"Love Story"	Jack Elinson and Norman Paul	Stan Walsh and Burnie Gruver	October 17, 1972	63-6
Alice shocks her family again by dating a homeless man named Norman, but when Harry and Irma find out that Norman has rich parents, they push Alice into staying with him.
7	7	"The Victim"	Mark Scott and Charles Anthony	Art Davis	October 24, 1972	63-7
Harry gets mugged and beaten in the park by a young criminal. While Harry and Ralph want the young criminal to be locked away, Chet and Alice want Harry to go soft on his assailant since it is his first offense.
8	8	"Chet's Job"	Terry Ryan	Stan Walsh	October 31, 1972	63-8
Harry gives his slacker son, Chet, an ultimatum: either find a job and pay rent or get out of the house. Chet decides to find a job — but ends up quitting after making enough money to pay his rent to the end of the year.
9	9	"Chet's Fiancee"	Mark Kammerman	Charles McElmurry and Stan Walsh	November 7, 1972	63-9
Chet dates a young, attractive decent young woman named Prudence and brings her home to meet Harry and Irma...and ends up shocking everyone when he tells Prudence that he does not want to marry her.
10	10	"The Mouse"	Bill Manhoff	Stan Walsh	November 14, 1972	63-10
Jamie runs away from home after Harry tells him he cannot keep a mouse as a pet.
11	11	"Duty Calls"	Charles Isaacs	Stan Walsh	November 21, 1972	63-11
Chet angers his parents when he tries to bail out of being drafted into the Army.
12	12	"Expectant Papa"	William Raynor and Myles Wilder	Art Davis	November 28, 1972	63-12
Irma worries that she may be pregnant again, which does not sit well with Chet and Alice, who feel the world is too overpopulated.
13	13	"The New Car"	Harriet Belkin and Norman Belkin	Stan Walsh and Paul Sommer	December 5, 1972	63-13
The Boyles are tricked into buying a crummy car, and fight back against the man who sold it to them.
14	14	"The New House"	Jack Elinson and Norman Paul	Paul Sommer	December 12, 1972	63-14
The Boyles consider moving into a bigger house, but Harry does not have the money for it. So which option is Harry going to choose, to buy a new house or not to buy a new house? His decision leaves him in danger of having to do both....
15	15	"The Prowler"	Jack Elinson and Norman Paul	Stan Walsh	December 19, 1972	63-15
When Ralph tries to stop a local crime wave he starts a neighborhood vigilante group in order to fight back against a burglar who has been breaking into houses in the Boyles' neighborhood. Their neighborhood becomes an armed camp. During the hysteria Harry gets tagged as a prowler.
16	16	"Mama's Identity"	Jack Elinson and Norman Paul	Stan Walsh and Paul Sommer	December 26, 1972	63-16
In an attempt to be more than just a housewife and mother, Irma takes a job as a secretary at a law firm, but struggles with sexual discrimination and competition from a younger, prettier coworker, while Harry and Ralph worry that women in the workplace will lead to men being treated like sex objects and second-class citizens.
17	17	"Papa the Patient"	Jack Elinson and Norman Paul	Stan Walsh	January 2, 1973	63-17
Harry is sent to the hospital after suffering from stress-related stomachaches.
18	18	"The Swimming Pool"	Mark Scott and Charles Anthony	Earl Klein and Stan Walsh	January 9, 1973	63-18
Harry builds a swimming pool for his family, but the neighbors end up using it.
19	19	"Sweet Sixteen"	Fred S. Fox and Seaman Jacobs	Stan Walsh and Paul Sommer	January 16, 1973	63-19
Irma wants Alice to have an extravagant 16th birthday party, but Harry is too cheap to do it.
20	20	"The Commune"	Jack Elinson and Norman Paul	Paul Sommer and Howard Swift	January 23, 1973	63-20
Alice runs away to a hippie commune to discover herself. Harry tries to get her to come back.
21	21	"Music Tycoon"	Jack Elinson and Norman Paul	Stan Walsh and Paul Sommer	January 30, 1973	63-21
When Chet and his friends become an overnight success and go to a garage band, Harry begins to wonder if his ideas about work have been a little out of tune but Chet soon learns that fame is fickle.
22	22	"Accidents Will Happen"	Stanley Ralph Ross	Stan Walsh and Paul Sommer	February 6, 1973	63-22
Harry splits his pants after slipping in a restaurant. Everyone advises Harry to sue, but Harry just wants a new pair of pants.
23	23	"Papa in New York"	Jack Elinson and Norman Paul	Stan Walsh and Paul Sommer	February 13, 1973	63-23
Harry is forced to bring Ralph to New York on a business trip.
24	24	"The Neighbors"	Harvey Bullock and R.S. Allen	Stan Walsh and Paul Sommer	February 20, 1973	63-24
Newlyweds Mona and George experience trouble in paradise when they fight over a new couch. The Boyles must get Mona and George (Guest Star Casey Kasem) back together when George moves in with the Boyles.

=== Season 2 (1973-74) ===
All 20 episodes of the second season were directed by Barrie Helmer.

No. overall	No. in season	Title	Written by	Storyboard by	Original release date	Prod. code
25	1	"Bringing Up Jamie"	Charles Isaacs	Don Christensen and Jan Green	September 11, 1973	63-25
A child psychologist recommends that Jamie take up photography to deal with his aggression, but Jamie only ends up photographing his family at their worst.
26	2	"The Lady Detective"	Jack Elinson and Norman Paul	Stan Walsh	September 18, 1973	63-26
An eccentric female detective (played by guest star Phyllis Diller) is hired to help Harry find out who stole from the company's payroll.
27	3	"Permissive Papa"	Dave Ketchum and Bruce Shelley	Stan Walsh and Roger Armstrong	September 25, 1973	63-27
Harry bars Alice from going to a concert and sets her up on a date with a nice man named Jay Jay, who turns out to be a pervert.
28	4	"Boyles on TV"	Arthur Julian	George Gordon	October 2, 1973	63-28
The Boyles are invited to be interviewed on TV, but Harry thinks having the entire family on TV will ruin his reputation.
29	5	"My Wife, The Secretary"	Mark Scott and Charles Anthony	Alex Lovy	October 9, 1973	63-29
With Harry's secretary on her honeymoon, Harry needs a temporary replacement. Irma goes undercover to fill the position.
30	6	"Papa, the Housewife"	Jack Elinson and Norman Paul	Stan Walsh and Roger Armstrong	October 16, 1973	63-30
Harry tries to take over the household shopping and treat it as a business, but finds himself in over his head.
31	7	"Jamie's Project"	Perry Grant and Dick Bensfield	Don Christensen	October 23, 1973	63-31
Harry helps Jamie with a project for a school-wide competition.
32	8	"Don for the Defence"	Jack Elinson and Norman Paul	Alex Lovy	November 6, 1973	63-32
Harry goes to court to contest a traffic violation—and ends up in deeper trouble when he hires an incompetent lawyer voiced by Guest Star Don Adams.
33	9	"Alice's Diet"	Jack Elinson and Norman Paul	Alex Lovy	November 13, 1973	63-33
After being spurned by a crush at school, Alice goes to a beauty farm, and comes back slim and beautiful.
34	10	"Mama Loves Monty"	Mark Scott and Charles Anthony	Alex Lovy	November 20, 1973	63-34
Irma signs herself and Harry to appear on a game show, but Harry misconstrues it as a sign that Irma is leaving him for game show host Monty Hall.
35	11	"Alice's Crush"	Charles Isaacs	Don Christensen	November 27, 1973	63-35
Alice has fallen in love; this time, her object of desire is one of her teachers.
36	12	"Papa's Big Check"	Sid Dorfman	Roger Armstrong	December 4, 1973	63-36
Harry gets an erroneous tax refund check for $940,000, and everybody's surprised that he wants to return it.
37	13	"Mama's Charity"	R.B. Rigby	Don Christensen	December 11, 1973	63-37
Irma ropes Harry into her Ladies Club charity efforts.
38	14	"Chet's Pad"	Perry Grant and Dick Bensfield	Warren Tufts	December 18, 1973	63-38
Chet finally moves out of the house and into his own place, but Harry keeps visiting Chet to parent him.
39	15	"Papa the Coach"	Jack Elinson and Norman Paul	Roger Armstrong	December 25, 1973	63-39
Harry is named the new coach of the high school basketball team, and must contend with the pushy parents of the players.
40	16	"Birdman Chet"	Skip Webster	George Gordon	January 1, 1974	63-40
Harry hires Chet so that he sets a better example for Jamie. Chet diverts the company's resources to make feeders for the endangered California condor.
41	17	"Back to Nature"	Roy Kammerman	Don Christensen	January 8, 1974	63-41
Harry takes his family on a camping trip to break them of their addiction to TV, but after a few days in the woods, Harry wants out.
42	18	"Alice's Freedom"	Perry Grant and Dick Bensfield	Don Christensen	January 15, 1974	63-42
Irma's mother visits and insists that Alice be allowed her freedom since she is a woman. Alice enjoys her freedom to do as she pleases, but soon realizes that there is a downside to too much freedom.
43	19	"The Beekeeper"	Everett Greenbaum and Jim Fritzell	Joseph Barbera	January 22, 1974	63-43
The Boyles call an exterminator (Guest Star Don Knots) to get rid of the bees in their backyard, but the exterminator ends up being more of a pest than the actual bees.
44	20	"Maude Loves Papa"	Jack Elinson and Norman Paul	Roger Armstrong	January 29, 1974	63-44
Harry attempts to collect back payment from a delinquent customer: Maude Frickert (Guest Star Jonathan Winters). Harry finds this sweet little old woman has a daredevil streak in her!

=== Season 3 (1974) ===
All four episodes of the third and final season were directed by Charles A. Nichols.

No. overall	No. in season	Title	Written by	Storyboard by	Original release date	Prod. code
45	1	"Rich Little, Supersleuth"	Harvey Bullock and R.S. Allen	Joseph Barbera	September 17, 1974	63-45
The bank next to Harry's store gets robbed. Rich Little guest stars as a bumbling sleuth who is a master of vocal disguises. He recruits Harry to help him protect a priceless coin collection.
46	2	"Model Alice"	Terry Ryan	Bob Ogle and Don Christensen	September 24, 1974	63-46
Harry objects when a painter asks Alice to pose nude.
47	3	"Marriage Counselor"	R.B. Rigby	Jan Green	October 1, 1974	63-47
Harry and Irma's visit to a marriage counselor threatens to destroy their relationship rather than save it.
48	4	"Car 54"	Mark Scott and Charles Anthony	Jan Green	October 8, 1974	63-48
Irma's brother-in-law (who works as a police officer) opens a kindergarten, which goes well, until a child goes missing.
