= Neil Nephew =

American actor and writer (1939–1978)

- Neil Nephew in The Young Savages (1961)
- Born: Neil Bernstein; July 17, 1939; New York City, U.S.
- Died: November 9, 1978 (aged 39); New York City, U.S.
- Other name: Neil J. Burstyn
- Occupations: Actor, writer, story editor
- Spouse: Ellen Burstyn (m. 1964; div. 1972)

Neil Burstyn (né Bernstein; July 17, 1939 – November 9, 1978), known professionally as Neil Nephew, was an American actor, writer and story editor.

His works as an actor include Panic in Year Zero! (1962), The Rebel Rousers (1970) and Alex in Wonderland (1970). He also worked as a story editor, writing two episodes of The Monkees in late 1967 and in early 1968.

== Early life ==
Neil Nephew was born as Neil Bernstein in New York, He was son of Hyman (Saul) and Florence (née Boobis) Bernstein, both of Jewish descent.

== Career ==
As an actor, Nephew appeared in the film Panic in Year Zero! in the role of Andy. As a writer, he wrote two episodes of The Monkees: "The Monkees' Christmas Show" (Air date: December 25, 1967) and "The Monstrous Monkee Mash" (Air date: January 22, 1968). In 1970, he appeared in the film The Rebel Rousers and in the film Alex in Wonderland with his ex wife Ellen Burstyn.

== Personal life ==
Nephew married actress Ellen Burstyn, then known professionally as Ellen McRae, in 1964. In her autobiography, Burstyn states that her husband began to use Burstyn, his grandfather's name, when at that time they were legally Mr. and Mrs. Bernstein. When she received a call from a film producer asking her what name should be used in the credits of Alex in Wonderland, she decided to change her name from Ellen McRae to Ellen Burstyn. They divorced in 1972.

In her autobiography, Burstyn recounts how Nephew was mentally ill, raped her, stalked her on the streets of New York, and screamed her name from the balcony of a Broadway theater when she was appearing in Same Time, Next Year. Nephew committed suicide in 1978 by jumping from the window of his ninth-floor Manhattan apartment.

== Filmography ==
Year	Title	Role	Notes
1961	The Young Savages	Anthony "Batman" Aposto/Rocco	Credited as Neil Nephew
1962	The Alfred Hitchcock Hour	Chuck (Credited as Neil Nephew)	Season 1 Episode 9: "The Black Curtain"
1962	Panic in Year Zero!	Andy	Credited as Neil Nephew
1970	The Rebel Rousers	Rebel	Credited as Neil Burstyn
1970	Alex in Wonderland	Norman	Credited as Neil Burstyn
