= The Rebel Rousers =

1970 film

- Theatrical release poster
- Directed by: Martin B. Cohen
- Written by: Michael Kars; Abe Polsky; Martin B. Cohen
- Produced by: Martin B. Cohen
- Starring: Cameron Mitchell; Bruce Dern; Jack Nicholson; Diane Ladd
- Cinematography: László Kovács
- Edited by: George W. Brooks
- Music by: William Loose
- Production company: Paragon International Pictures
- Distributed by: Four Star Excelsior
- Release date: April 1970
- Running time: 78 minutes

The Rebel Rousers is a 1970 American independent outlaw biker film starring Cameron Mitchell, Jack Nicholson, Diane Ladd, Bruce Dern, and Harry Dean Stanton. Filmed in 1967, it did not receive a release until 1970 following the success of Easy Rider. It is one of several motorcycle gang films of the period to feature Nicholson, Dern and Stanton. The film was co-written, produced and directed by Martin B. Cohen in his only directorial effort.

== Plot ==
Paul Collier searches for Karen, his girl friend who is going to have his child but ran away from him instead of marrying him. As the two attempt to reconcile a small motorcycle gang called the Rebel Rousers comes into the town. Their leader, J.J. Weston went to school and played football with Paul, but rather than catch up with each other, Paul goes to search for Karen and J.J. goes with his gang. The gang's exuberant behavior in a local diner causes the sheriff to run them out of town.

Outside of the town, Paul and Karen are captured by the gang with Paul beaten up and the gang vying for who will be the first to have their way with Karen. Though J.J. tries to help the couple the gang pull a pistol on him. J.J. seeks to delay Karen's fate by holding a motorcycle drag race to determine who will "win" Paul's pregnant girlfriend.

Paul makes his way to the town where the sheriff is away taking a prisoner to another town to serve his sentence. No one in town will help Paul free his girlfriend until he comes across a group of Mexicans who confront the Rebel Rousers.

== Cast ==
- Cameron Mitchell as Paul Collier
- Bruce Dern as J.J. Weston
- Diane Ladd as Karen
- Dean Stanton as Randolph
- Jack Nicholson as Bunny
- Neil Nephew as a Gang member
- John 'Bud' Cardos as the sheriff

== Production ==
Martin B. Cohen was the manager of Bruce Dern and his then wife Diane Ladd, formed his own film company Paragon International Pictures. Following the success of The Wild Angels, Cohen cast Dern and Ladd who was pregnant with Laura Dern in the motorcycle gang film. Bruce Dern brought his friend Jack Nicholson in the film along with Nicholson's former roommate Harry Dean Stanton and their friend Neil Nephew. John 'Bud' Cardos acted as production manager, performed stunts and appeared in the film. Cohen, who recalled the film as the worst thing he ever made told Dern that he was friends with Cameron Mitchell whose name would be above the title as he was a big star. Cameron Mitchell remembered Jack Nicholson picking out a pair of striped pants and a stocking hat to in order to stand out in the film.

The film was shot in January 1967 in Paradise Cove, Malibu, California and Chloride, Arizona but not released until after the success of Easy Rider.
