= The Young Savages =

1961 film by John Frankenheimer

- Directed by: John Frankenheimer
- Screenplay by: Edward Anhalt; J.P. Miller
- Based on: A Matter of Conviction by Evan Hunter
- Produced by: Pat Duggan; Harold Hecht (executive producer)
- Starring: Burt Lancaster; Dina Merrill; Shelley Winters; Telly Savalas
- Cinematography: Lionel Lindon
- Edited by: Eda Warren
- Music by: David Amram
- Production companies: Hecht-Hill-Lancaster Productions; Contemporary Productions
- Distributed by: United Artists
- Release date: May 24, 1961
- Running time: 103 minutes
- Country: United States
- Language: English
- Box office: $1,750,000

The Young Savages is a 1961 American crime drama film directed by John Frankenheimer and starring Burt Lancaster, It was Frankenheimer's second film, the first of five with Lancaster.

The film was from a 1959 novel A Matter of Conviction by Evan Hunter, and was inspired by recent youth gang violence in New York City, including the Salvador Agron case.

== Plot ==
Three teenagers from the Italian section of New York City's East Harlem, Danny diPace, Anthony Aposto, and the Irish-American Arthur Reardon, are members of a mostly Italian-American greaser street gang named the Thunderbirds. They have an ongoing turf war with a Puerto Rican gang, based in the Spanish-speaking section of East Harlem, called the Horsemen. As the movie begins, the three Thunderbirds unleash a knife attack on Roberto Escalante, a blind member of the Horsemen, stabbing him to death.

They are caught and arrested and, during questioning by the police, claim that they were acting in self-defense after Escalante attacked them with a knife. During their interrogation, the assistant district attorney assigned to the case, Hank Bell, discovers one of the boys is the son of Mary diPace, an ex-girlfriend.

Bell tells the District Attorney, Dan Cole, about this past relationship and that he grew up in the same neighborhood as the Thunderbirds. But Cole, who plans to run for governor, is anxious to prosecute the three teens and refuses to take him off the case. It emerges that Bell had changed his name from Bellini to conceal his Italian background and where he grew up. Over the years, Bell had found this advantageous in pursuing his career and in the opportunity to marry Karin, who had attended Vassar and came from a higher social class.

At the funeral for Escalante, Bell is confronted by Escalante's mother, who demands that the three youths be put to death, and by Mary, who tells him that her son is innocent and had promised he would never join a gang. Bell then sets out to find the facts about the killing, meeting one by one with all the families and gang members involved.

Karin opposes the death penalty, but Cole is anxious to seek the maximum penalty to gain political advantage.

Members of the Thunderbirds intimidate Karin in the elevator of their home with switchblade knives, and Bell is attacked on a subway train by a gang of teenagers. He is not certain whether it is the Thunderbirds or the Horsemen. Soon after, he visits the warlord of the Thunderbirds, "Pretty Boy" Savarese, and warns him against targeting members of his family.

Savarese asserts the innocence of the boys, who he says killed Escalante in self-defense, and says that the murdered boy was a full-fledged member of the Horsemen and had aided the gang by concealing weapons used in gang attacks. During his investigation, Bell also learns that Aposto is mentally handicapped and that diPace had once intervened to save a Puerto Rican child from drowning by members of the Thunderbirds gang. These findings add to the ambiguity of the case.

When the trial concludes with different sentences for each boy, tailored to their individual natures, Escalante's mother asks Bell if justice had been served. He answers unhappily that a great many people bear responsibility for her son's death.

== Cast ==
- Burt Lancaster as Hank Bell (Bellini)
- Dina Merrill as Karin Bell
- Edward Andrews as R. Daniel Cole
- Shelley Winters as Mary diPace
- Larry Gates as Randolph
- Telly Savalas as Detective Gunderson
- Pilar Seurat as Louisa Escalante
- Roberta Shore as Jenny Bell
- Milton Selzer as Dr. Walsh
- David J. Stewart as Barton
- John Davis Chandler as Arthur Reardon
- Neil Nephew as Anthony "Batman" Aposto
- José Pérez as Roberto Escalante
- Stanley Kristien as Danny diPace
- Luis Arroyo as Zorro
- Chris Robinson as "Pretty Boy" Savarese

== Production ==
According to Frankenheimer, the film was produced for economic reasons because of the producer's financial problems. He explained in an interview that "the production company of Hecht-Hill-Lancaster had got itself deeply into debt they'd had to agree to do four very inexpensive pictures, with Burt Lancaster getting $150,000 instead of his usual price of $750,000. He'd just come off Elmer Gantry (1960), and the last thing on earth he wanted to do was this movie."

== Reception ==
The film has a 44% "fresh" rating on the Rotten Tomatoes review aggregation site.

Variety called the film "a kind of non-musical east side variation on West Side Story," and said that the film was "inventively, arrestingly directed by John Frankenheimer with the aid of cameraman Lionel Lindon," who "manipulated the lens to catch the wild fury of gang pavement warfare; twisting, tilting, pulling way back, zeroing in and composing to follow and frame the excitement." But Variety said Frankenheimer failed to make Hunter's novel "stand tall as screen fiction."

Writing in The New York Times, film critic Bosley Crowther said the film, obviously inspired by recent headline-making youth gang violence, "soft-soaps" juvenile delinquency and "doesn't provide much valid drama or do much good." He criticized the script, which he said gave excessive emphasis to the personal conflicts of the Bell character, but he praised Lancaster's "vigorous" performance. He also singled out for praise Kristien, Arroyo and Chris Robinson, who played Savarese.

Time magazine said the film was "excitingly photographed" and was "at its best when at its ugliest." such as the subway beating of Bell, "but the prosecutor's personal life keeps getting in the way." The magazine criticized Dina Merrill's performance as "having the animation of a damp Post Toasty" and also lambasted the direction by the "much touted TV director" Frankenheimer.

Los Angeles Times critic Philip K. Scheuer praised the "tough, taut and tense" film, which he wrote "reveals an increasingly conscious effort to get at Causes―environment, heredity, the slums, public apathy, political expediency, the responsibility of society toward its young." Scheuer called the young performers "unforgettable standouts" and lauded the "brilliantly bravura cast."

In her 1982 review compilation 5001 Nights at the Movies, Pauline Kael said of the film: "You're awfully conscious that the picture means to be hard-hitting; it sometimes succeeds, but a lot of it is just worthy."

== See also ==
- List of American films of 1961
- List of hood films
