= Kathryn Hereford =

American film producer

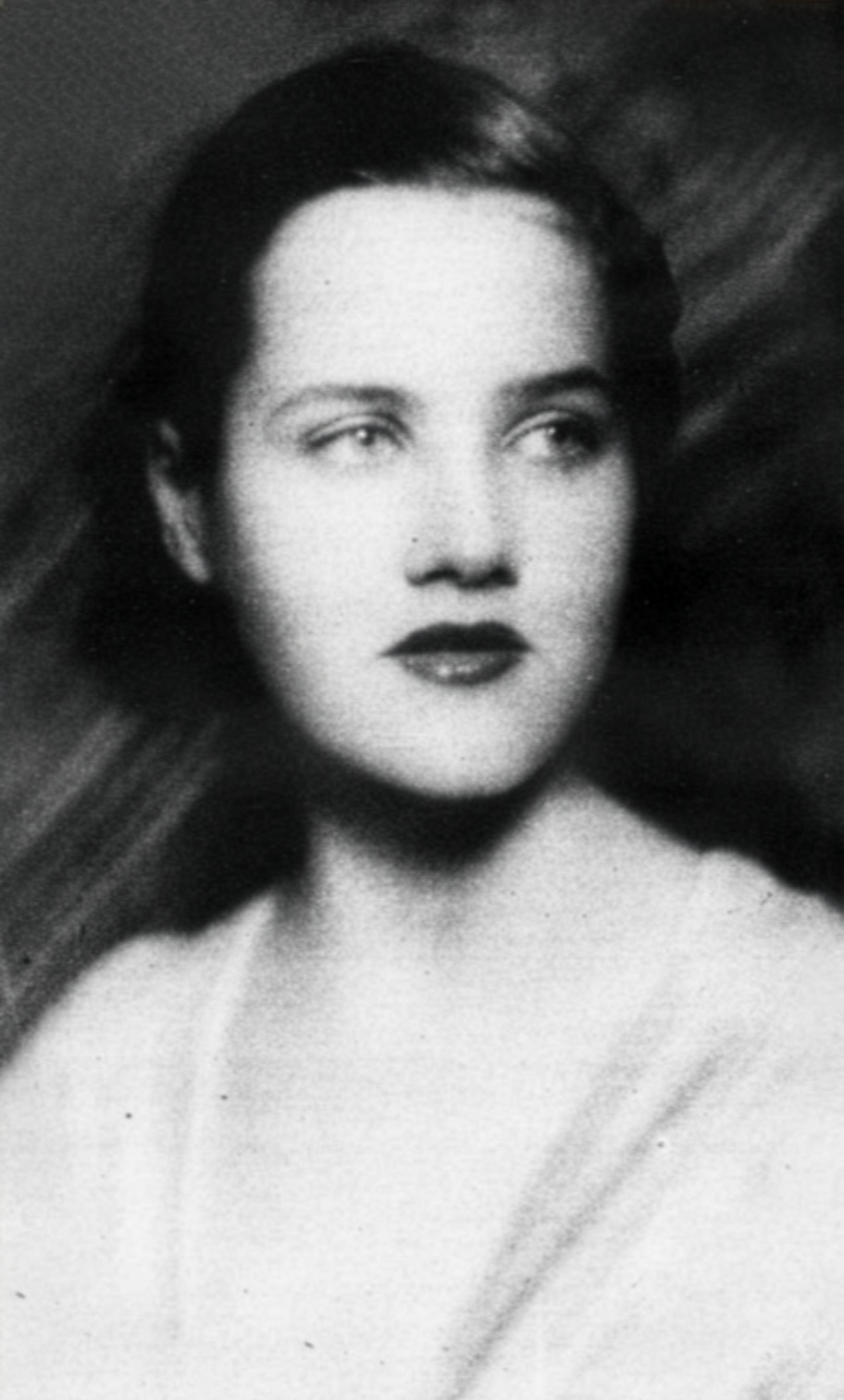
- Hereford in 1929
- Born: December 2, 1910; Virginia, USA
- Died: December 17, 1993 (aged 83); Los Angeles, California, USA
- Occupations: Film producer, actress, dancer
- Spouse: Pandro S. Berman

Kathryn Hereford (1910-1993) was an American film producer, dancer, and actress. She was married to Paramount producer Pandro S. Berman.

== Biography ==
After being discovered by Florenz Ziegfeld, Hereford began her career as a stage actress on Broadway, appearing in a number of musicals. She then transitioned into a career on the big screen; her first known credit was on 1935's The Great Ziegfeld.

She later transitioned into producing films under Paramount's Pandro S. Berman. According to Berman, he made Hereford a producer on 1957's Jailhouse Rock as she'd been an Elvis fan for quite some time, and she'd go on to work on 11 films afterward. Most of her credits are as associate producer, but she was the lead producer on 1960s Key Witness.

In 1960, she became Berman's second wife, and the pair remained married until her death in 1993.

== Selected filmography (as producer) ==
- Move (1970)
- Justine (1969)
- A Patch of Blue (1965)
- Honeymoon Hotel (1964)
- The Prize (1963)
- Sweet Bird of Youth (1962)
- Butterfield 8 (1960)
- Key Witness (1960)
- All the Fine Young Cannibals (1960)
- The Reluctant Debutante (1958)
- The Brothers Karamazov (1958)
- Jailhouse Rock (1957)
