= Who's Minding the Mint? =

1967 film by Howard Morris

- 1967 film poster by Jack Rickard
- Directed by: Howard Morris
- Written by: R. S. Allen; Harvey Bullock
- Produced by: Norman Maurer
- Starring: Jim Hutton; Dorothy Provine; Walter Brennan; Milton Berle; Joey Bishop; Bob Denver; Victor Buono; Jack Gilford
- Cinematography: Joseph Biroc
- Edited by: Adrienne Fazan
- Music by: Lalo Schifrin
- Distributed by: Columbia Pictures
- Release date: September 26, 1967 (U.S.)
- Running time: 97 minutes
- Country: United States
- Language: English

Who's Minding the Mint? is a 1967 American crime comedy film directed by Howard Morris and starring Jim Hutton, Dorothy Provine, Walter Brennan and Milton Berle. The screenplay, concerning a group of individuals who break into a United States Treasury building to print currency, was written by R. S. Allen and Harvey Bullock. The movie was produced by Norman Maurer for Columbia Pictures and is Morris' directorial debut. The supporting cast features Joey Bishop and Bob Denver. It was the last leading role for Jim Hutton.

== Plot ==
Harry Lucas (Jim Hutton) works at the Bureau of Engraving and Printing in Washington, D.C. He has an admirer in sweet co-worker Verna Baxter (Dorothy Provine), who tries to woo him by giving him home-made, yet famously inedible fudge, but he avoids her because he doesn't feel ready for anything serious. He also has a nemesis in co-worker and supervisor Samson Link (David J. Stewart), who can't understand how Harry manages to live beyond his means. Unbeknownst to Link, Harry relies on free trials that enable him to take luxury apartments and ride in chauffeured cars, enjoying the good life, including romance with a sexy neighbor.

After Harry inadvertently drops $50,000 in new currency into a bag with Verna's fudge and leaves the mint with it, he unknowingly destroys the newly minted money when he dumps the entire contents of the bag into his garbage disposal. Realizing what he has done, he now fears Link and an audit at the mint.

In desperation, Harry turns to Pop (Walter Brennan), a former mint employee forced into retirement just before getting the chance to operate the presses he always maintained, and now has little to live for except the company of his pregnant beagle, Inky. Pop agrees to help Harry sneak into the mint after hours and print up replacement currency.

Harry learns that they will need help from others to succeed. One by one, he has to offer a partnership to a safecracker named Dugan (Jack Gilford); Luther (Milton Berle), a pawnbroker who can front expenses; Ralph (Joey Bishop), a public works employee who can navigate a secret passage to the mint through D.C.'s sewer system; an amusement park boat captain (Victor Buono) who can build a boat that can fit down a manhole, and an ice cream truck driver named Willie (Bob Denver) who has the means to distract the one resident on the street whose apartment overlooks the manhole. Harry ultimately winds up asking Verna to help once Pop reminds him that a professional cutter will be needed to cut the printed sheets of bills. To his surprise, she agrees to help.

Unknown to Verna, however, the other conspirators accept an offer of $2,000 apiece at first, but as they rehearse for the big night, they decide to help Harry only on the condition that he and Pop will print them a million dollars apiece.

An unexpected change at the mint forces the caper to be moved up. The group has to drop what they are doing and go in immediately. Despite the rehearsals, many things go wrong, including Ralph bringing along his straight-off-the-boat Italian cousin Mario (Jamie Farr), and Inky going into labor. Verna is upset when she discovers that far more than $50,000 is being printed.

After several setbacks, the group manages to leave with the money — over seven million dollars — only to have Mario mistakenly allow uniformed garbage collectors (whom he mistakes for police officers) to haul away the cardboard boxes containing the bills, placing them on a barge to be dumped into the ocean.

Harry is defeated. He goes to the mint to confess to Link, knowing that he likely will lose his job and be sent to prison on a variety of felony charges. Pop saves the day when, on the steps of the mint, he turns up with $50,000 in extra bills that were printed and used to line the box in which Inky gave birth. Harry can replace the missing currency now, and he also has a new appreciation for the pure-hearted Verna. Later, the rest of the gang, including Inky, are seen searching for the lost currency with scuba diving equipment.

== Cast ==
External images
- Publicity Still
- Publicity Still
- Publicity Still
- Publicity Still
- Publicity Still

- Jim Hutton as Harry Lucas
- Dorothy Provine as Verna Baxter
- Walter Brennan as Pop Gillis
- Milton Berle as Luther Burton
- Joey Bishop as Ralph Randazzo
- Bob Denver as Willie Owens
- Jack Gilford as Avery Dugan
- Victor Buono as the Captain
- Jamie Farr as Mario
- David J. Stewart as Samson Link
- Jackie Joseph as Imogene Harris
- Erin Moran as little girl on tricycle (uncredited)
- Robert Ball as Grayson

== Production notes ==
The film was produced by Norman Mauer who had a deal with Columbia. Star Jim Hutton had just appeared in Walk Don't Run and filming started July 1966.

The score was composed by Lalo Schifrin.

The opening titles sequence, designed by the prolific Wayne Fitzgerald, displays the credits over images of Federal Reserve Notes, which were still in use for official transactions at the time, starting with a $1 bill and ending with a $100,000 bill. (Everything larger than $100 has since been withdrawn.)

Over $3,000,000 of real United States currency was used in the movie, but was carefully watched by armed guards.

Most of the currency shown being printed was larger by half than actual United States currency and had obvious printing errors, so there was no chance the money could be passed as genuine.

== Release ==
Dell published a 12-cent comic book version of this movie as a tie-in.

Filmink called the film "a cheerful farce that is a lot of fun.. it's kind of like It's a Mad Mad Mad Mad World (1963) only without the stars. Who's Minding the Mint? was constantly on television when we were growing up, but it does not seem to have been a hit."

== See also ==
- List of American films of 1967
