= List of Love, American Style episodes =

This is a list of episodes for the ABC television series Love, American Style. Most of the episodes consist of two or more unconnected segments.

== Series overview ==
Season	Episodes	Originally released	
Season	Episodes	First released	Last released
1	24	September 29, 1969	March 27, 1970
2	24	September 25, 1970	March 12, 1971
3	22	September 17, 1971	February 25, 1972
4	23	September 15, 1972	March 9, 1973
5	15	September 14, 1973	January 11, 1974

== Episodes ==
=== Season 1 (1969–1970) ===
No. overall	No. in season	Title	Directed by	Written by	Original release date
1	1	"Love and a Couple of Couples"	Jerry Paris	Arnold Margolin & Jim Parker	September 29, 1969
1	1	"Love and the Hustler"	Bruce Bilson	Robert L. Goodwin	September 29, 1969
1	1	"Love and the Pill"	Jud Taylor	Norman Lessing	September 29, 1969
"Love and the Hustler" featured Eddie "Rochester" Anderson, Mantan Moreland, and Flip Wilson
2	2	"Love and the Living Doll"	Bruce Bilson	Larry Markes	October 6, 1969
2	2	"Love and the Letter"	Alan Rafkin	Lila Garrett & Bernie Kahn	October 6, 1969
2	2	"Love and the Joker"	Bruce Bilson	Bill Box	October 6, 1969
2	2	"Love and the Unlikely Couple"	Bruce Bilson	Bob Rodgers	October 6, 1969
In "Love and the Joker", a practical joker's pranks threaten his relationship with his girlfriend. In "Love and the Living Doll" a man uses a blow-up sex doll to make his unfaithful girlfriend jealous.
3	3	"Love and the Doorknob"	Bruce Bilson	Frank and Doris Hursley	October 13, 1969
3	3	"Love and the Phone Booth"	Charles R. Rondeau	Dale McRaven	October 13, 1969
4	4	"Love and the Legal Agreement"	Jeffrey Hayden	George Kirgo	October 20, 1969
4	4	"Love and the Militant"	Bruce Bilson	Harry Winkler & Harry Dolan	October 20, 1969
4	4	"Love and Who?"	Richard Michaels	David Davis & Jerry Music	October 20, 1969
LOVE AND THE LEGAL AGREEMENT Despite their trial separation, a couple continues to live together. Problems arise as they attempt to date other people.
5	5	"Love and the Modern Wife"	Alan Rafkin	Allan Burns	October 27, 1969
5	5	"Love and the Phonies"	Bruce Bilson	Arnold & Lois Peyser	October 27, 1969
5	5	"Love and the Single Couple"	Jud Taylor	James & Helen Damico	October 27, 1969
LOVE AND THE MODERN WIFE. A wife takes a course in how to improve her marriage much to her husband's chagrin. LOVE AND THE PHONIES. A married couple complain about all the phony couples at the party they were attending while they are phony themselves. LOVE AND THE SINGLE COUPLE. A woman's parents are upset that she is living with a man without being married to him.
6	6	"Love and the Busy Husband"	Coby Ruskin	Terry Ryan	November 3, 1969
6	6	"Love and the Dating Computer"	Gary Nelson	Michael Elias & Frank Shaw	November 3, 1969
6	6	"Love and the Watchdog"	Bruce Bilson	Bill Idelson & Harvey Miller	November 3, 1969
LOVE AND THE DATING COMPUTE: A dating service accidentally pairs two men together. LOVE AND THE WATCHDOG: A needy watchdog proves to be more trouble than he's worth to reunited divorcees.
7	7	"Love and the Advice Givers"	Bruce Bilson	Bruce Howard	November 10, 1969
7	7	"Love and the Geisha"	Bruce Bilson	Harry Winkler & Harry Dolan	November 10, 1969
7	7	"Love and Take Me Along"	Oscar Rudolph	George Slavin & Stanley Adams	November 10, 1969
8	8	"Love and the Burglar"	Charles R. Rondeau	Bill Idelson & Harvey Miller	November 17, 1969
8	8	"Love and the Roommate"	Charles R. Rondeau	Allan Burns	November 17, 1969
8	8	"Love and the Wild Party"	Bruce Bilson	Roy Kammerman	November 17, 1969
9	9	"Love and the Big Leap"	Bruce Bilson	Dale McRaven	November 24, 1969
9	9	"Love and the Former Marriage"	Coby Ruskin	Story by : Phillip Shuken; Teleplay by : Bill Idelson & Harvey Miller	November 24, 1969
9	9	"Love and the Good Deal"	Jerry Paris	Garry Marshall & Jerry Belson	November 24, 1969
LOVE AND THE FORMER MARRIAGE. A man's co-dependent ex-wife and her second husband call him to help them prevent their daughter's elopment.
10	10	"Love and the Athlete"	Unknown	Unknown	December 1, 1969
10	10	"Love and the Dummies"	Unknown	Unknown	December 1, 1969
10	10	"Love and Mother"	Unknown	Unknown	December 1, 1969
10	10	"Love and the Shower"	Unknown	Unknown	December 1, 1969
LOVE AND THE DUMMIES "Two shy ventriloquists flirt using their dummies." LOVE AND MOTHER "Three is definitely a crowd when a new bride's mother shows up to spend the night in the happy couple's room."
11	11	"Love and the Comedy Team"	Unknown	Unknown	December 8, 1969
11	11	"Love and the Divorce Sale"	Unknown	Unknown	December 8, 1969
11	11	"Love and the Mountain Cabin"	Unknown	Unknown	December 8, 1969
In "The Comedy Team", two comedy writers try to meet a deadline while a fiancée bugs them. "
12	12	"Love and the Bachelor"	Unknown	Unknown	December 22, 1969
12	12	"Love and the Other Love"	Unknown	Unknown	December 22, 1969
12	12	"Love and the Positive Man"	Unknown	Unknown	December 22, 1969
13	13	"Love and the Medium"	Unknown	Unknown	December 29, 1969
13	13	"Love and the Bed"	Unknown	Unknown	December 29, 1969
13	13	"Love and the High School Flop-Out"	Unknown	Unknown	December 29, 1969
14	14	"Love and the Pick-Up"	Unknown	Unknown	January 5, 1970
14	14	"Love and the Proposal"	Unknown	Unknown	January 5, 1970
14	14	"Love and the Fighting Couple"	Unknown	Unknown	January 5, 1970
15	15	"Love and the Boss's Ex"	Unknown	Unknown	January 12, 1970
15	15	"Love and Mr. Nice Guy"	Unknown	Unknown	January 12, 1970
15	15	"Love and the Gangster"	Unknown	Unknown	January 12, 1970
16	16	"Love and Those Poor Crusaders' Wives"	Unknown	Unknown	January 23, 1970
16	16	"Love and the Big Night"	Unknown	Unknown	January 23, 1970
16	16	"Love and the V.I.P. Restaurant"	Unknown	Unknown	January 23, 1970
"Love and Those Poor Crusaders' Wives". A man has a chastity belt stuck on him.
17	17	"Love and the Nervous Executive"	Unknown	Unknown	January 30, 1970
17	17	"Love and the Hitchhiker"	Unknown	Unknown	January 30, 1970
17	17	"Love and the Great Catch"	Unknown	Unknown	January 30, 1970
"Love and the Nervous Executive". A newly promoted executive is distracted at his job by his beautiful secretary."Love and the Hitchhiker". A man tries to make out with a pretty hitchhiking hippie. " Love and the Great Catch." Adam West visits a husband and wife to buy his stamps, but her lovesick sister insists on seeing him.
18	18	"Love and the Banned Book"	Unknown	Unknown	February 6, 1970
18	18	"Love and the First-Nighters"	Unknown	Unknown	February 6, 1970
18	18	"Love and the King"	Unknown	Unknown	February 6, 1970
"Love and the Banned Book." A jealous husband suspects that his wife's best-selling romance novel is based on her real life and affairs with other men. "Love and the First-Nighters." A pair of high school kids pretend to be newlyweds so that they can make out in a hotel room. "Love and the King." A married man is tempted to have a one-night stand when an old army buddy brings two women over while his wife leaves town to visit her ailing mother.
19	19	"Love and the Coed Dorm"	Unknown	Unknown	February 13, 1970
19	19	"Love and the Optimist"	Unknown	Unknown	February 13, 1970
19	19	"Love and the Teacher"	Unknown	Unknown	February 13, 1970
In "Love and the Coed Dorm", a college student gets a pretty new roommate. In "Love and the Optimist", a down on his luck inventor tries to keep a jilted woman from committing suicide, only to decide to end it all himself. In "Love and the Teacher", a womanizing artist confronts his son's sex education teacher.
20	20	"Love and the Safely Married Man"	Unknown	Unknown	February 20, 1970
20	20	"Love and the Uncoupled Couple"	Unknown	Unknown	February 20, 1970
20	20	"Love and the Many Married Couple"	Unknown	Unknown	February 20, 1970
"Love and the Safely Married Man - A man pretends to be married with kids in order to get a woman's attention."
21	21	"Love and Las Vegas"	Unknown	Unknown	February 27, 1970
21	21	"Love and the Good Samaritan"	Unknown	Unknown	February 27, 1970
21	21	"Love and the Marriage Counselor"	Unknown	Unknown	February 27, 1970
"Love and Las Vegas." When a man's fiancée brakes up with him for insisting on getting married in a cheap Las Vegas wedding chapel, he gets drunk and the next couple mistakes him for the minister and asks him to marry them. "Love and the Good Samaritan." On his way to a costume party, a man helps a woman with her plumbing emergency when her jealous husband comes home. "Love and the Marriage Counselor." Two business partners see how a marriage counselor to keep their business from breaking over their bickering.
22	22	"Love and the Other Guy"	Unknown	Unknown	March 6, 1970
22	22	"Love and Grandma"	Unknown	Unknown	March 6, 1970
23	23	"Love and the Fly"	Unknown	Unknown	March 13, 1970
23	23	"Love and the Millionaires"	Unknown	Unknown	March 13, 1970
23	23	"Love and Double Trouble"	Unknown	Unknown	March 13, 1970
24	24	"Love and the Minister"	Unknown	Unknown	March 27, 1970
24	24	"Love and the Geisha"	Unknown	Unknown	March 27, 1970
24	24	"Love and the Singles Apartment"	Unknown	Unknown	March 27, 1970
"Love and the Minister." A minister falls in love with the bride whose wedding he is conducting.

=== Season 2 (1970–1971) ===
No. overall	No. in season	Title	Original release date
25	1	"Love and the Father"	September 25, 1970
25	1	"Love and the Motel"	September 25, 1970
"Love and the Father", a dad skips prison to attend his daughter's wedding."
26	2	"Love and the Nurse"	October 2, 1970
26	2	"Love and the Old Boyfriend"	October 2, 1970
27	3	"Love and the Hypnotist"	October 9, 1970
27	3	"Love and the Psychiatrist"	October 9, 1970
28	4	"Love and the Big Date"	October 16, 1970
28	4	"Love and the Longest Night"	October 16, 1970
29	5	"Love and the Elopement"	October 23, 1970
29	5	"Love and the Visitor"	October 23, 1970
30	6	"Love and the Eskimo"	October 30, 1970
30	6	"Love and the Nuisance"	October 30, 1970
31	7	"Love and the Decision"	November 6, 1970
31	7	"Love and the Haunted House"	November 6, 1970
"Love and the Haunted House". A stranded engaged couple have to spend the night in what seems to be a haunted house.
32	8	"Love and the Fur Coat"	November 13, 1970
32	8	"Love and the Trip"	November 13, 1970
"Love and the Fur Coat." A guy who's married also has a girlfriend who claims that he promised to get her a fur coat, so he scurries to get one. "Love and the Trip." A couple's son is visiting them, and they find he has what they think are drugs and they don't know what to do with it. They end up smoking it.
33	9	"Love and the Young Executive"	November 20, 1970
34	10	"Love and the Champ"	November 27, 1970
34	10	"Love and the Pen Pals"	November 27, 1970
35	11	"Love and the Intruder"	December 4, 1970
35	11	"Love and the Lost Dog"	December 4, 1970
"Love and the Intruder." A man sneaks his date into his boss's apartment only to have it interrupted by a home invasion.
36	12	"Love and the Happy Couple"	December 11, 1970
36	12	"Love and the Understanding"	December 11, 1970
37	13	"Love and the Man Next Door"	December 18, 1970
38	14	"Love and the Kidnapper"	January 1, 1971
An inept kidnapper grabs a spoiled housewife, hoping for a big payday from the woman's wealthy husband. Things don't go quite according to plan.
39	15	"Love and the Only Child"	January 8, 1971
39	15	"Love and the Wig"	January 8, 1971
40	16	"Love and Operation Model"	January 15, 1971
40	16	"Love and the Sack"	January 15, 1971
40	16	"Love and the Triangle"	January 15, 1971
41	17	"Love and the Cake"	January 22, 1971
41	17	"Love and Murphy's Bed"	January 22, 1971
41	17	"Love and the Neighbor"	January 22, 1971
41	17	"Love and the Serious Wedding"	January 22, 1971
"Love and the Cake". a baker fends off the admirers of the woman who pops out of the cake. "Love and the Serious Wedding". A pair of practical jokers plan their wedding, but the bride wants it to be a serious one. "Love and Murphy's Bed." A married couple both use their murphy bed to hide their lovers from each other.
42	18	"Love and the Big Game"	January 29, 1971
42	18	"Love and the Nutsy Girl"	January 29, 1971
42	18	"Love and the Vampire"	January 29, 1971
"Love and the Big Game." A married couple suspects their two best friends of cheating at bridge. "Love and the Vampire." Tiny Tim owns a stone mansion and looks like a vampire, Robert Reed and Judy Karn are the newlyweds staying as guests.
43	19	"Love and the Arctic Station"	February 5, 1971
43	19	"Love and the Pulitzer Prize"	February 5, 1971
43	19	"Love and the Tattoo"	February 5, 1971
"Love and the Arctic Station" Three servicemen stationed in an Arctic station for months without seeing a woman look forward to a USO girl's visit.
44	20	"Love and the Baker's Half Dozen"	February 12, 1971
44	20	"Love and the New Roommate"	February 12, 1971
44	20	"Love and the Rug"	February 12, 1971
44	20	"Love and the Second Time"	February 12, 1971
"Love and the Rug" A groom pretends to be bald to see if his bride-to-be would love him despite his looks. "Love and the Baker's Half Dozen" A baker depends on the wedding cake he baked in order to pay alimony to his ex-wife and avoid her brother's wrath, but the bride suddenly cancels the order.
45	21	"Love and the Boss"	February 19, 1971
45	21	"Love and the Jury"	February 19, 1971
45	21	"Love and the Logical Explanation"	February 19, 1971
45	21	"Love and the Pregnancy"	February 19, 1971
46	22	"Love and the Heist"	February 26, 1971
46	22	"Love and the Love Potion"	February 26, 1971
46	22	"Love and the Teddy Bear"	February 26, 1971
47	23	"Love and the Duel"	March 5, 1971
47	23	"Love and the Note"	March 5, 1971
47	23	"Love and the Young Unmarrieds"	March 5, 1971
48	24	"Love and the Fuzz"	March 12, 1971
48	24	"Love and the Groupie"	March 12, 1971
48	24	"Love and the Housekeeper"	March 12, 1971
48	24	"Love and Women's Lib"	March 12, 1971

=== Season 3 (1971–1972) ===
No. overall	No. in season	Title	Original release date
49	1	"Love and Formula 26B"	September 17, 1971
49	1	"Love and the Loud Mouth"	September 17, 1971
49	1	"Love and the Penal Code"	September 17, 1971
"Love and Formula 26B". A chemist slips his frigid wife a sex enhancement formula. "Love and the Penal Code". A man reports to the police that he was raped by two women, and two feminists claim to have done it in order to become famous.
50	2	"Love and the Anniversary Crisis"	September 24, 1971
50	2	"Love and the Conjugal Visit"	September 24, 1971
50	2	"Love and the Dream Burglar"	September 24, 1971
50	2	"Love and the Hotel Caper"	September 24, 1971
50	2	"Love and the Monsters"	September 24, 1971
"Love and the Anniversary Crisis". A couple's family try to save their marriage when they decide to divorce on their 43rd wedding anniversary.
51	3	"Love and the Artful Codger"	October 1, 1971
51	3	"Love and the Neglected Wife"	October 1, 1971
51	3	"Love and the Traveling Salesman"	October 1, 1971
52	4	"Love and the Ledge"	October 8, 1971
52	4	"Love and the See-Through Man"	October 8, 1971
52	4	"Love and the Television Weekend"	October 8, 1971
52	4	"Love and the Waterbed"	October 8, 1971
"Love and the Ledge". A beautiful girl tries to keep a failed actor from committing suicide.
53	5	"Love and the Detective"	October 15, 1971
53	5	"Love and the Guilty Conscience"	October 15, 1971
53	5	"Love and the Mixed Marriage"	October 15, 1971
53	5	"Love and the Wake-Up Girl"	October 15, 1971
54	6	"Love and the Awakening"	October 22, 1971
54	6	"Love and the Bashful Groom"	October 22, 1971
54	6	"Love and the Four-Sided Triangle"	October 22, 1971
54	6	"Love and the Naked Stranger"	October 22, 1971
55	7	"Love and the Lovesick Sailor"	October 29, 1971
55	7	"Love and the Mistress"	October 29, 1971
55	7	"Love and the Reincarnation"	October 29, 1971
55	7	"Love and the Sex Survey"	October 29, 1971
"Love and the Reincarnation." A couple's honeymoon is interrupted by a dog who the bride believes is the reincarncation of her late first husband.
56	8	"Love and the Married Bachelor"	November 5, 1971
56	8	"Love and the Sweet Sixteen"	November 5, 1971
56	8	"Love and the Vacation"	November 5, 1971
56	8	"Love and the Well-Groomed Bride"	November 5, 1971
57	9	"Love and the Baby"	November 12, 1971
57	9	"Love and the Big Mother"	November 12, 1971
57	9	"Love and the Free Weekend"	November 12, 1971
57	9	"Love and the Jealous Husband"	November 12, 1971
57	9	"Love and the Old Cowboy"	November 12, 1971
58	10	"Love and the College Professor"	November 19, 1971
58	10	"Love and the Eyewitness"	November 19, 1971
58	10	"Love and the Lady Barber"	November 19, 1971
58	10	"Love and the Plumber"	November 19, 1971
59	11	"Love and the Accidental Passion"	December 3, 1971
59	11	"Love and the Black Limousine"	December 3, 1971
59	11	"Love and the Eskimo's Wife"	December 3, 1971
59	11	"Love and the Tuba"	December 3, 1971
60	12	"Love and the Bowling Ball"	December 10, 1971
60	12	"Love and the Check"	December 10, 1971
60	12	"Love and the Hiccups"	December 10, 1971
60	12	"Love and the Liberated Lady Boss"	December 10, 1971
61	13	"Love and the Particular Girl"	December 17, 1971
61	13	"Love and the Fountain of Youth"	December 17, 1971
61	13	"Love and the House Bachelor"	December 17, 1971
61	13	"Love and the Waitress"	December 17, 1971
62	14	"Love and the Contact Lens"	December 31, 1971
62	14	"Love and the Doctor's Honeymoon"	December 31, 1971
62	14	"Love and the Motel Mixup"	December 31, 1971
63	15	"Love and the Lady Athlete"	January 7, 1972
63	15	"Love and the Lady Killers"	January 7, 1972
63	15	"Love and the New Size 8"	January 7, 1972
63	15	"Love and the Single Sister"	January 7, 1972
"Love and the Lady Athlete." A track official visits an East German athlete, suspecting her of really being a man.
64	16	"Love and the Big Surprise"	January 14, 1972
64	16	"Love and the Security Building"	January 14, 1972
64	16	"Love and the Ski Lodge"	January 14, 1972
64	16	"Love and the Happy Unhappy Couple"	January 14, 1972
64	16	"Love and the Topless Policy"	January 14, 1972
65	17	"Love and the Advice Column"	January 21, 1972
65	17	"Love and the Bathtub"	January 21, 1972
65	17	"Love and the Fullback"	January 21, 1972
65	17	"Love and the Guru"	January 21, 1972
65	17	"Love and the Physical"	January 21, 1972
"Love and the Bathtub". A bride gets her toe stuck in the bathtub faucet on her wedding day.
66	18	"Love and the Anxious Mama"	January 28, 1972
66	18	"Love and the Boomerang"	January 28, 1972
66	18	"Love and the Private Eye"	January 28, 1972
"Love and the Private Eye" was an animated pilot for Hanna-Barbera.
67	19	"Love and the Plane Truth"	February 4, 1972
67	19	"Love and the Scroungers"	February 4, 1972
67	19	"Love and the Small Wedding"	February 4, 1972
68	20	"Love and the Bachelor Party"	February 11, 1972
68	20	"Love and the Latin Lover"	February 11, 1972
68	20	"Love and the Old-Fashioned Father"	February 11, 1972
68	20	"Love and the Test of Manhood"	February 11, 1972
"Love and the Old-Fashioned Father" was the animated pilot to Hanna-Barbera's Wait Till Your Father Gets Home, which debuted in syndication in fall 1972 and ran for three seasons.
69	21	"Love and the Alibi"	February 18, 1972
69	21	"Love and the Instant Father"	February 18, 1972
69	21	"Love and the Lovely Evening"	February 18, 1972
69	21	"Love and Lover's Lane"	February 18, 1972
69	21	"Love and the Split-Up"	February 18, 1972
"Love and the Instant Father." A single man pretends to be a parent to impress a pretty girl at a single parent's meeting.
70	22	"Love and the Television Set"	February 25, 1972
70	22	"Love and the Newscasters"	February 25, 1972
"Love and the Television Set." (Titled "Love and the Happy Days" in syndication.) An American family of the 1950s gets their first television; teenage son Richie and his friend Potsie assume it can be used as a chick magnet. Written directly for television by Garry K. Marshall, this was the pilot episode for Happy Days. It also inspired the George Lucas film American Graffiti.

=== Season 4 (1972–1973) ===
No. overall	No. in season	Title	Original release date
71	1	"Love and the Know-It-All"	September 15, 1972
71	1	"Love and the Perfect Wife"	September 15, 1972
71	1	"Love and the Sensuous Twin"	September 15, 1972
71	1	"Love and the Triple Threat"	September 15, 1972
72	2	"Love and the Amateur Night"	September 22, 1972
72	2	"Love and the Cheaters"	September 22, 1972
72	2	"Love and the Love Nest"	September 22, 1972
72	2	"Love and the Unbearable Fiancé"	September 22, 1972
"Love and the Unbearable Fiance." A woman introduces a grizzly bear to her parents as her fiancé. "Love and the Cheaters." A guilt-stricken adulterer tries to make it up to his wife by getting her to have an affair herself.
73	3	"Love and the Lucky Couple"	September 29, 1972
73	3	"Love and the Mail Room"	September 29, 1972
73	3	"Love and the New Act"	September 29, 1972
73	3	"Love and the Overnight Guests"	September 29, 1972
74	4	"Love and the Girlish Groom"	October 6, 1972
74	4	"Love and the New You"	October 6, 1972
74	4	"Love and the Oldlyweds"	October 6, 1972
74	4	"Love and the Wishing Star"	October 6, 1972
75	5	"Love and Dear Old Mom and Dad"	October 13, 1972
75	5	"Love and the High School Sweetheart"	October 13, 1972
75	5	"Love and the Spaced Out Chick"	October 13, 1972
75	5	"Love and the Country Girl"	October 13, 1972
"Love and the Spaced Out Chick." A man falls in love with a girl from Venus.
76	6	"Love and the Confession"	October 20, 1972
76	6	"Love and the Disappearing Box"	October 20, 1972
76	6	"Love and the Hip Arrangement"	October 20, 1972
76	6	"Love and the Old Flames"	October 20, 1972
77	7	"Love and the Happy Medium"	October 27, 1972
77	7	"Love and the Jinx"	October 27, 1972
77	7	"Love and the Little Black Book"	October 27, 1972
77	7	"Love and the Old Swingers"	October 27, 1972
78	8	"Love and the Clinic"	November 3, 1972
78	8	"Love and the Perfect Wedding"	November 3, 1972
78	8	"Love and the President"	November 3, 1972
78	8	"Love and the Return of Raymond"	November 3, 1972
79	9	"Love and the Hairy Excuse"	November 10, 1972
79	9	"Love and Lady Luck"	November 10, 1972
79	9	"Love and the Pick-Up Fantasy"	November 10, 1972
"Love and the Hairy Excuse." A man lies to his wife by claiming to be a werewolf so that he can have affairs at night. "Love and Lady Luck" A couple's honeymoon in Las Vegas is marred when the bride develops a gambling addiction.
80	10	"Love and the Christmas Punch"	November 17, 1972
80	10	"Love and the Mystic"	November 17, 1972
80	10	"Love and the Tycoon"	November 17, 1972
81	11	"Love and the Caller"	November 24, 1972
81	11	"Love and the Secret Life"	November 24, 1972
81	11	"Love and the Swinging Philosophy"	November 24, 1972
81	11	"Love and the Woman in White"	November 24, 1972
82	12	"Love and the First Kiss"	December 1, 1972
82	12	"Love and the Impressionist"	December 1, 1972
82	12	"Love and the Super Lover"	December 1, 1972
"Love and the First Kiss." A caveman invents the kiss. "Love and the Super Lover." A super-hero costume has unusual effects on its renter-wearer, yet "there's a penalty" for not returning it to the costume rental shop before midnight.
83	13	"Love and the Ghost"	December 8, 1972
83	13	"Love and the Out-of-Town Client"	December 8, 1972
83	13	"Love and the Secret Habit"	December 8, 1972
"Love and the Ghost." The ghost of a widower's first wife returns to haunt both him and his bride-to-be.
84	14	"Love and the Cryptic Gift"	January 5, 1973
84	14	"Love and the Family Hour"	January 5, 1973
84	14	"Love and the Legend"	January 5, 1973
84	14	"Love and the Sexpert"	January 5, 1973
In "Love and the Cryptic Gift", a wife gets mad at her husband for buying a pair of cemetery plots.
85	15	"Love and the Face Bow"	January 12, 1973
85	15	"Love and the Impossible Gift"	January 12, 1973
85	15	"Love and the Love Kit"	January 12, 1973
86	16	"Love and the Missing Mister"	January 19, 1973
86	16	"Love and the Old Lover"	January 19, 1973
86	16	"Love and the Twanger Tutor"	January 19, 1973
87	17	"Love and the Singing Suitor"	January 26, 1973
87	17	"Love and the Unmarriage"	January 26, 1973
87	17	"Love and the Wee He"	January 26, 1973
"Love and the Singing Suitor" A man tries to woo a girl by singing to her like in movie musicals.
88	18	"Love and the Hand Maiden"	February 2, 1973
88	18	"Love and the Hot Spell"	February 2, 1973
88	18	"Love and the Laughing Lover"	February 2, 1973
88	18	"Love and the Perfect Set-Up"	February 2, 1973
"Love and the Laughing Lover". A bride's habit of laughing when she is about to make love bothers her husband.
89	19	"Love and the Anniversary"	February 9, 1973
89	19	"Love and the Playwright"	February 9, 1973
89	19	"Love and the Trampled Passion"	February 9, 1973
90	20	"Love and the Baby Derby"	February 16, 1973
90	20	"Love and the Burglar Joke"	February 16, 1973
90	20	"Love and the Favorite Family"	February 16, 1973
"Love and the Favorite Family." A tv sit-com family seems like the perfect family behind the camera, but they really dysfunctional and constantly bickering in real life. "Love and the Baby Derby." Two greedy brothers compete to be the first one to marry and have a baby in order to inherit one million dollars from their rich uncle.
91	21	"Love and the Crisis Line"	February 23, 1973
91	21	"Love and the Happy Family"	February 23, 1973
91	21	"Love and the Vertical Romance"	February 23, 1973
92	22	"Love and the Mind Reader"	March 2, 1973
92	22	"Love and the Mr. and Mrs."	March 2, 1973
92	22	"Love and the Soap Opera"	March 2, 1973
93	23	"Love and the End of the Line"	March 9, 1973
93	23	"Love and the Growing Romance"	March 9, 1973
93	23	"Love and the Postal Meeter"	March 9, 1973

=== Season 5 (1973–1974) ===
No. overall	No. in season	Title	Original release date
94	1	"Love and the Footlight Fiancee"	September 14, 1973
94	1	"Love and the Plane Fantasy"	September 14, 1973
94	1	"Love and the Swinging Surgeon"	September 14, 1973
94	1	"Love and the Teller's Tale"	September 14, 1973
"Love and the Teller's Tale." A banker and teller fall in love with each other when they accidentally get locked inside a bank vault.
95	2	"Love and the Comedienne"	September 21, 1973
95	2	"Love and the Lie"	September 21, 1973
95	2	"Love and the Lifter"	September 21, 1973
95	2	"Love and the Suspicious Husband"	September 21, 1973
96	3	"Love and the Golden Memory"	September 28, 1973
96	3	"Love and the Heavy Set"	September 28, 1973
96	3	"Love and the Novel"	September 28, 1973
96	3	"Love and the See-Through Mind"	September 28, 1973
96	3	"Love and the Seven Year Wait"	September 28, 1973
97	4	"Love and the Games People Play"	October 5, 1973
97	4	"Love and High Spirits"	October 5, 1973
97	4	"Love and the Memento"	October 5, 1973
97	4	"Love and the Single Husband"	October 5, 1973
97	4	"Love and the Stutter"	October 5, 1973
"Love and the Stutter." A man who has a habit of stuttering whenever he's in love panics when he fails to do so when he thinks of his wife. "Love and the Memento." A late millionaire's secretary is left one item of her choosing in his will as a keepsake, but his spoiled son is determined to see that it is as cheap as possible.
98	5	"Love and the Bonded Separation"	October 12, 1973
98	5	"Love and the Fractured Fibula"	October 12, 1973
98	5	"Love and the Pretty Secretary"	October 12, 1973
99	6	"Love and the Cozy Comrades"	October 19, 1973
99	6	"Love and the Flunky"	October 19, 1973
99	6	"Love and the Hoodwinked Honey"	October 19, 1973
99	6	"Love and the Secret Spouse"	October 19, 1973
100	7	"Love and the Fortunate Cookie"	November 2, 1973
100	7	"Love and the Lady Prisoner"	November 2, 1973
100	7	"Love and the Opera Singer"	November 2, 1973
100	7	"Love and the Weighty Problem"	November 2, 1973
"Love and the Opera Singer." A man tells his date the story of how his opera singer ancestor lost his voice and career for the woman he loved.
101	8	"Love and the Clinical Problem"	November 9, 1973
101	8	"Love and the Eat's Cafe"	November 9, 1973
101	8	"Love and the Last Joke"	November 9, 1973
101	8	"Love and the Persistent Assistant"	November 9, 1973
101	8	"Love and the Unsteady Steady"	November 9, 1973
"Love and the Unsteady Steady." Two preteens imagine what their futures together would be like at the school dance.
102	9	"Love and the Big Top"	November 16, 1973
102	9	"Love and the Locksmith"	November 16, 1973
102	9	"Love and the Odd Couples"	November 16, 1973
102	9	"Love and the Unwedding"	November 16, 1973
103	10	"Love and the Blue Plate Special"	November 23, 1973
103	10	"Love and the Man of the Year"	November 23, 1973
103	10	"Love and the Time Machine"	November 23, 1973
"Love and the Time Machine" A scientist's assistant uses his boss' time machine to re-live his disastrous date over and over again until he gets it right.
104	11	"Love and the Hidden Meaning"	November 30, 1973
104	11	"Love and the Model Apartment"	November 30, 1973
104	11	"Love and the Parent's Sake"	November 30, 1973
104	11	"Love and the Three-Timer"	November 30, 1973
104	11	"Love and the Weirdo"	November 30, 1973
105	12	"Love and the Awkward Age"	December 5, 1973
105	12	"Love and the Generation Gasp"	December 5, 1973
105	12	"Love and the Spendthrift"	December 5, 1973
106	13	"Love and Carmen Lopez"	December 28, 1973
106	13	"Love and the Cover"	December 28, 1973
106	13	"Love and the Cryin' Cowboy"	December 28, 1973
"Love and the Cryin' Cowboy". Two record producers try to keep a lonely country music singer from finding true love since he can only write his best songs when he is depressed.
107	14	"Love and the Extra Job"	January 4, 1974
107	14	"Love and the Flying Finletters"	January 4, 1974
107	14	"Love and the Golden Worm"	January 4, 1974
107	14	"Love and the Itchy Condition"	January 4, 1974
107	14	"Love and the Patrolperson"	January 4, 1974
108	15	"Love and the Competitors"	January 11, 1974
108	15	"Love and the Forever Tree"	January 11, 1974
108	15	"Love and the Image Makers"	January 11, 1974
108	15	"Love and Mr. Bunny"	January 11, 1974
108	15	"Love and the Phobia"	January 11, 1974
"Love and the Forever Tree." Two lovers meet every year by a tree where they carved their initials together when they were children.

== Home releases ==
At present, the following DVD sets have been released by Paramount Home Video.

DVD set	Episodes	Release date
Love, American Style: Season One, Volume One	12	November 20, 2007
Love, American Style: Season One, Volume Two	12	March 11, 2008
