= Don't Drink the Water (1969 film) =

1969 film by Howard Morris

- Film poster by Sandy Kossin
- Directed by: Howard Morris
- Screenplay by: R. S. Allen and Harvey Bullock
- Based on: Don't Drink the Water by Woody Allen
- Produced by: Charles H. Joffe; Jack Rollins (uncredited); Joseph E. Levine (executive producer)
- Starring: Jackie Gleason; Estelle Parsons; Ted Bessell; Joan Delaney
- Cinematography: Harvey Genkins
- Edited by: Ralph Rosenblum A.C.E. (editorial supervision)
- Music by: Pat Williams
- Distributed by: Avco Embassy Pictures
- Release date: November 11, 1969
- Running time: 100 minutes
- Country: United States
- Language: English

Don't Drink the Water is a 1969 American comedy film starring Jackie Gleason and Estelle Parsons. It is directed by Howard Morris and based upon a 1966 play Don't Drink the Water by Woody Allen. The supporting cast includes Ted Bessell and Joan Delaney.

In 1994, Allen remade the story as the television film Don't Drink the Water, with himself as Walter Hollander.

== Plot ==
Walter Hollander, a caterer, is on vacation with his wife Marion and daughter Susan. While flying to Athens, their plane is hijacked to Vulgaria, behind the Iron Curtain. While waiting for the plane to be cleared to take off again, Marion insists they go outside and take a few pictures. Unfortunately they are in a restricted area so the secret police suspect them of being spies. Inspector Krojak sends a squad of soldiers with machine guns to arrest them, and the Hollanders flee to the car of the American ambassador which is parked nearby.

The Hollanders take refuge in the U.S. Embassy nearby. The ambassador is away, leaving only his inept son Axel Magee to grant the Hollanders political asylum. Picketers protest outside the embassy as everyone tries to figure a way out. Complicating matters further is that Susan has fallen in love with Axel.

Marion busies herself by scrupulously cleaning the embassy as if it were her own home. Walter makes long-distance phone calls but they bring only bad news - including that his catering business has become involved in a food poisoning scandal.

Axel hopes that an influential Arab Sheik might help out. But when the Sultan shows signs of wanting to add daughter Susan to his harem; Walter explodes and throws the Sultan out.

Axel finally gets the idea of throwing a fancy party at the Embassy, and to have the Hollander's leave in disguise among the guests. Father Drobney, an eccentric rabbi also seeking asylum, gets them through border checkpoints thanks to his knowledge of the local language.

Daughter Susan has remained behind to marry Axel and remain in the safety of the embassy while Walter, Marion, and Drobney escape Vulgaria in a rickety biplane.

== Cast ==
- Jackie Gleason as Walter Hollander
- Estelle Parsons as Marion Hollander
- Ted Bessell as Axel Magee
- Joan Delaney as Susan Hollander
- Michael Constantine as Krojack
- Howard St. John as Ambassador Magee
- Danny Meehan as Kilroy
- Richard Libertini as Father Drobney
- Avery Schreiber as The Sultan
- Mark Gordon as Mirik
- Phil Leeds as Sam
- Pierre Olaf as Chef
- Howard Morris as Biplane Pilot
