= McKeever and the Colonel =

American sitcom

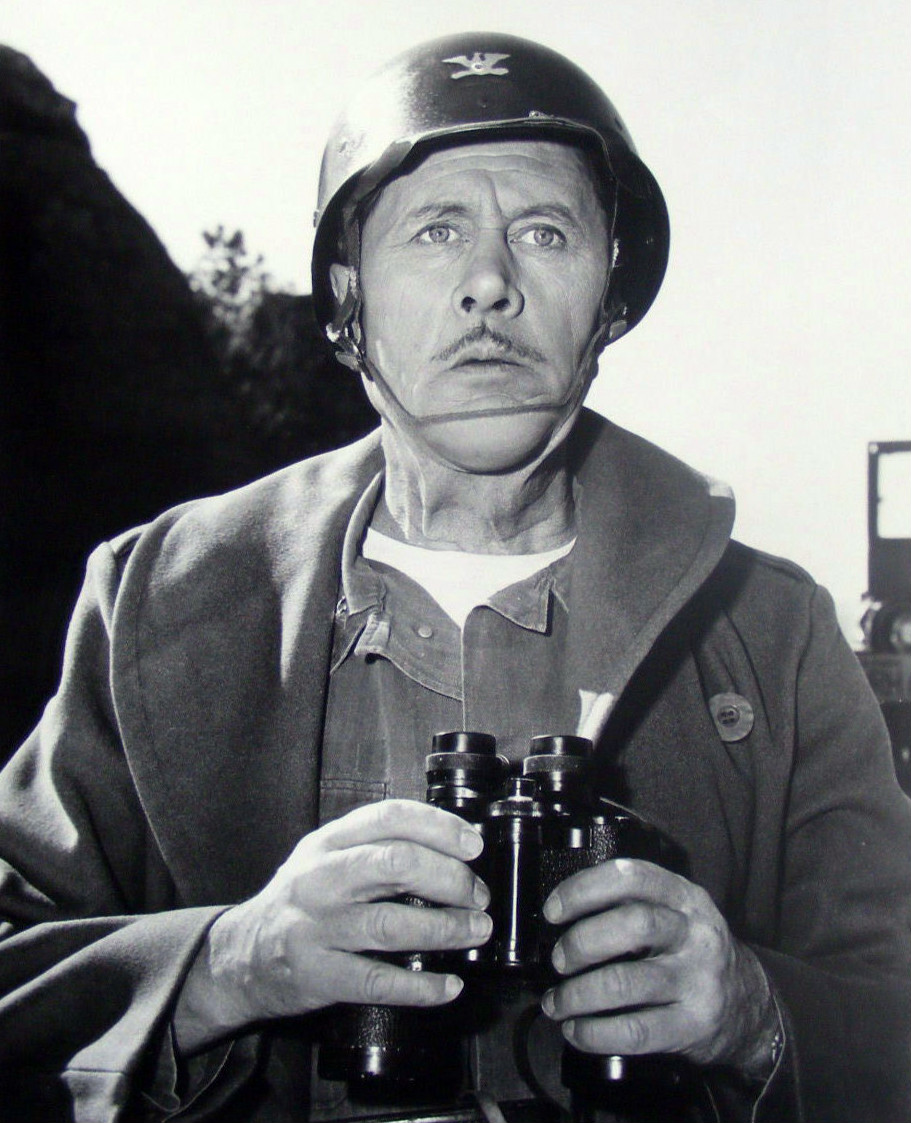
- Allyn Joslyn as Colonel Harvey T. Blackwell.
- Created by: R. S. Allen; Harvey Bullock
- Written by: R. S. Allen; Harvey Bullock; Max Wilk; Arthur Marx; Albert Lewin; Burt Styler; Harvey Helm; Bob Marcus
- Starring: Scott Lane; Allyn Joslyn; Jackie Coogan; Elisabeth Fraser; John Eimen; David White
- Composers: Herschel Burke Gilbert; Joseph Mullendore
- Country of origin: United States
- No. of episodes: 26

Production
- Producer: Tom McKnight
- Camera setup: Multi-camera
- Running time: 30 minutes per episode
- Production company: Four Star-Harlen

Original release
- Network: NBC
- Release: September 23, 1962 – June 16, 1963

McKeever and the Colonel is an American sitcom that was broadcast on NBC from September 23, 1962 to June 16, 1963, on Sunday nights at 6:30 p.m. Eastern Time. Its setting was a fictional military academy known as Westfield. Dick Powell's Four Star Television produced the series.

== Synopsis ==
Gary McKeever (played by Scott Lane) was the lead character, a likable but mischievous cadet. He often found himself in trouble with Westfield Academy's commandant, the pompous Colonel Harvey T. Blackwell (played by character actor Allyn Joslyn). Jackie Coogan played Master Sergeant Claude Barnes, a down-to-earth school staffer who was more sympathetic to McKeever.

The program also starred Elisabeth Fraser as the dietician Miss Frances Warner, character actor David White, and child actors Keith Taylor as Tubby and John Eimen as Monk.

== Other media ==
Dell Comics published three issues of a McKeever and the Colonel comic book.

Milton Bradley came out with a Bamboozle board game based on the series.

Halco Toys, a division of the J. Halpern Company issued a tie-in set containing a belt with canteen, toy automatic pistol, holster and hand grenade.

== Episode list ==
No.	Title	Directed by	Written by	Original release date
1	"General McKeever"	John Rich	Max Wilk	September 23, 1962
2	"The Army Mule"	Norman Abbott	Story by : Lou Derman & Max Wise; Teleplay by : Ray Allen	September 30, 1962
3	"TV or Not TV"	Norman Abbott	Sam Locke & Joel Rapp	October 7, 1962
4	"Straight and Narrow"	Don Weis	Sam Locke & Joel Rapp	October 14, 1962
5	"The Mascot"	Unknown	Unknown	October 28, 1962
6	"The Cookie Crumbles"	Don Weis	Burt Styler & Al Lewin	November 4, 1962
7	"By the Book"	Richard Whorf	R.S. Allen and Harvey Bullock	November 11, 1962
8	"The Bugle Sounds"	Norman Abbott	Max Wilk	November 18, 1962
9	"Blackwell's Stand"	Norman Abbott	Allan Manning & Arthur Marx	November 25, 1962
10	"McKeever and the Celestial Bells"	Norman Abbott	Dean Reisner	December 2, 1962
11	"Hand in Glove"	Don Weis	Sam Locke & Joel Rapp	December 9, 1962
12	"Hair Today, Gone Tomorrow"	Don Weis	Burt Styler & Al Lewin	December 16, 1962
13	"Happy Birthday, Colonel"	Andrew McCullough	Al Schwartz & Ralph Goodman	December 23, 1962
14	"For Dear Old Westfield"	Don Weis	Elroy Schwartz & Austin Kalish	December 30, 1962
15	"Too Many Sergeants"	Stanley Z. Cherry	John Brandfond & Barry Blitzer	January 6, 1963
16	"McKeever's Astronaut"	Stanley Z. Cherry	Sam Locke & Joel Rapp	January 20, 1963
17	"The Neighbor"	Norman Abbott	Arthur Marx & Bob Fisher	January 27, 1963
18	"Love Comes to Westfield"	Stanley Z. Cherry	Al Lewis & Burt Styler	February 10, 1963
19	"The Big Charade"	Jeffrey Hayden & Don Weis	R.S. Allen	February 17, 1963
20	"The Old Grad"	Jeffrey Hayden	Story by : Harvey Helm & Bob Marcus; Teleplay by : Ray Allen	March 3, 1963
21	"All Quiet on the Westfield Front"	Stanley Z. Cherry	Elroy Schwartz & Austin Kalish	March 10, 1963
22	"Feat of Clay"	Christian Nyby	Sam Locke & Joel Rapp	March 17, 1963
23	"Make Room for Mother"	Stanley Z. Cherry	Jerry Seelen & Leo Rifkin	March 24, 1963
24	"Project Walkie-Talkie"	Unknown	Unknown	March 31, 1963
25	"Blackwell, the Retread"	Gene Nelson	Max Wilk	April 7, 1963
26	"McKeever Meets Munroe"	Unknown	Unknown	April 14, 1963
