= Honeymoon Hotel (1964 film) =

1964 film by Henry Levin

- Directed by: Henry Levin
- Written by: R.S. Allen; Harvey Bullock
- Produced by: Pandro S. Berman; Kathryn Hereford
- Starring: Robert Goulet; Nancy Kwan; Robert Morse; Jill St. John
- Cinematography: Harold Lipstein
- Edited by: Rita Roland
- Music by: Walter Scharf
- Production company: Metro-Goldwyn-Mayer
- Release date: June 3, 1964
- Running time: 89 minutes
- Country: United States
- Language: English

Honeymoon Hotel is a 1964 American romantic comedy film, directed by Henry Levin for Metro-Goldwyn-Mayer. It stars Robert Goulet, Nancy Kwan, Robert Morse, and Jill St. John.

The movie, which contains four songs, is a sex farce about two male friends who find themselves at a hotel that is supposed to be for honeymooners only. Unusual for its time, the film centers on an interracial romance (involving characters played by Robert Goulet and Nancy Kwan) but the racial difference is never mentioned or even alluded to.

== Plot ==
Jay Menlow breaks up with his fiancée, Cynthia, just before his wedding. He decides to still use his honeymoon accommodation—a hotel on a tropical island. He takes along his best friend, the womanizing bachelor Ross Kingsley, who is meant to be representing his boss, Sampson, at a convention.

Jay and Ross arrive at the hotel and realize that guests are usually restricted to honeymooning couples. Ross manages to date the hotel's only single girl, Lynn, the social director, who is a friend of Cynthia's. Jay wants to get back with Cynthia but Ross discourages it.

Sampson arrives at the hotel with a beautiful girl, Sherry, who knows Ross. Shortly afterwards, Cynthia arrives, as does Mrs. Sampson. Lynn thinks Sherry is Ross's girl and Cynthia thinks Sherry is with Jay.

Ross manages to keep his job and unites with Lynn. Jay dumps Cynthia and winds up with Sherry.

== Cast ==
- Robert Goulet as Ross Kingsley
- Nancy Kwan as Lynn Hope
- Robert Morse as Jay Menlow
- Jill St. John as Sherry Nugent
- Keenan Wynn as Mr. Sampson
- Anne Helm as Cynthia Hampton
- Elsa Lanchester as Chambermaid
- Bernard Fox as Room Clerk
- Elvia Allman as Mrs. Sampson
- Sandra Gould as Mabel - Switchboard Operator
- David Lewis as Mr. Hampton
- Chris Noel as Nancy Penrose
- Dale Malone as Fatso
- Paulene Myers as Hogan - Ross's Secretary

== Production ==
The film was based on an original script. Henry Levin wanted Dolores Hart, who he had directed in two previous movies, to play one of the female leads but she decided to become a nun.

The movie was once known as His and Hers? and His and His.

Filming started October 1963 and took place at MGM studios.

== Reception ==
The Los Angeles Times said, "it's fun for a while, then one wishes for more material."

Goulet's wife, Carol Lawrence, wrote that the film was "a disaster".

== See also ==
- List of American films of 1964
