= Joan Delaney =

American actress

Joan Delaney is a former model and actress in the United States. She married film editor Stuart Pappé and moved to a farm in New Mexico.

== Filmography ==
- The President's Analyst (1967) as Nan Butler
- Don't Drink the Water (1969 film) as Susan Hollander
- Alex in Wonderland (1970) as Jane
- Bunny O'Hare (1971) as R. J. Hart
