= Bunny O'Hare =

1971 film by Gerd Oswald

- Theatrical release poster
- Directed by: Gerd Oswald
- Written by: Stanley Z. Cherry; Coslough Johnson
- Produced by: Samuel Z. Arkoff; James H. Nicholson
- Starring: Bette Davis; Ernest Borgnine; Jack Cassidy; Joan Delaney; John Astin
- Cinematography: Loyal Griggs; John M. Stephens
- Edited by: Fred R. Feitshans Jr.
- Music by: Billy Strange
- Distributed by: American International Pictures
- Release date: October 18, 1971
- Running time: 91 min
- Country: United States
- Language: English
- Budget: $900,000

Bunny O'Hare is a 1971 American comedy film directed by Gerd Oswald, starring Bette Davis and Ernest Borgnine. The screenplay by Coslough Johnson and Stanley Z. The film focuses on a pair of senior citizens who, disguised as hippies, engage in a crime spree.

== Plot ==
Bunny O'Hare, a widow whose savings have been depleted by her selfish, middle-aged children, Lulu and Ad, finds herself homeless when the bank forecloses on her mortgage. She becomes friendly with Bill Green, an aging itinerant salvaging the house's plumbing, who she soon discovers is really fugitive bank robber William Gruenwald. Hoping to recoup her losses from the bank that took her home, Bunny blackmails Bill into teaching her how to rob the institution in exchange for keeping his identity a secret. She wears a long blonde wig, oversized hat, and sunglasses, while he dons a fake beard, leather vest, and bell-bottom pants, and the two pull off the caper and escape on a 250cc Triumph TR25W Trophy motorcycle. Buoyed by their success, Bunny convinces Bill to join her in more heists, and the different modus operandi they use – setting free a canary to distract the guard, setting off smoke bombs – make it difficult for police lieutenant Horace Greeley and criminologist R. J. Hart to profile their suspects.

== Cast ==
- Bette Davis as Bunny O'Hare
- Ernest Borgnine as Bill Green
- Jack Cassidy as Lieutenant Greeley
- Jay Robinson as John C. Rupert
- Joan Delaney as R. J. Hart
- John Astin as Ad
- Reva Rose as Lulu

== Production ==
The working titles for the film were Bunny and Claude, Bunny, Betty and Claude, and Bunny and Billy. The film marked the second on-screen pairing of Bette Davis and Ernest Borgnine, who co-starred in The Catered Affair in 1956. The American International Pictures release was filmed partially on location in Belen and Albuquerque. New Mexico Governor David F. Cargo made a cameo appearance as a state trooper.

The film led to two lawsuits for American International Pictures. Davis, who had script approval, was upset with changes made in editing. Davis had insisted on using an expletive in the film that would have garnered an R rating, so Samuel Z. Arkoff hired an actress who did a Bette Davis impression to reloop the dialogue with a less objectionable word. Davis sued the company for loss of income and damage to her career for changing the film into a "slapstick" production instead of the "humorous social commentary" for which she had signed. The suit eventually was dropped. Writer Stanley Z. Cherry sued for $13,400, the balance of his fee, and also asked for 5% of the film's net profits. The outcome is unknown.

== Soundtrack ==
The soundtrack includes the following vocals:

- "Monday Man", written by Billy Strange and Keith Roberts, performed by Billy Curb
- "Right Or Wrong", written by Mack David and Billy Curb, performed by Billy Curb
- "The Ballad Of Bunny O'Hare", written by Mack David and Billy Curb, performed by Billy Curb

== Reception ==
Bette Davis was unhappy with the final film and sued AIP for $3.3 million in damages.

== Critical reception ==
In his review in The New York Times, Vincent Canby described the film as "a silly, foolishly entertaining movie ... nonsense of a quite acceptable order, filled with absurd chases and stock characters who have been conceived and played with affection." Of its star he observed, "Miss Davis ... gives a performance that may be one of the funniest and most legitimate of her career." In the Cleveland Press, Toni Mastroianni said, "Bette Davis and Ernest Borgnine play a Bonnie and Clyde of the Geritol set and the result is about as satisfying as a bad television show." Time Out London called it an "embarrassingly unfunny caper". According to TV Guide, "This clever script is ineptly directed by Oswald, who has no idea of how to embellish the comedy with pace, movement, or wit. Davis and Borgnine are excellent, though, showing that years of training and professionalism can overcome just about anything."

== See also ==
- List of American films of 1971
