= Loyal Griggs =

American cinematographer (1906–1978)

Loyal Allen Griggs
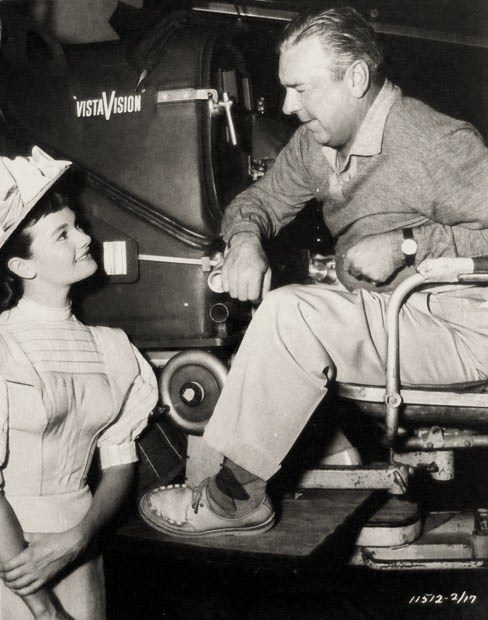
- On the set of We're No Angels, with Gloria Talbott
- Born: August 15, 1906; Elk, Michigan, U.S.
- Died: May 6, 1978 (aged 71); U.S.
- Occupation: Cinematographer

Loyal Griggs, A.S.C. (August 15, 1906 – May 6, 1978) was an American cinematographer.

Griggs joined the staff of Paramount Pictures in 1924 after graduating from school and initially worked at the studio's process department. He was promoted from assistant photographer to second unit photographer to camera process photographer, before becoming director of photography for three 1951 releases: Crosswinds, Passage West and The Last Outpost.

Griggs won the Academy Award for Best Cinematography for the 1953 Western Shane. He was part of the production team that received an Academy Honorary Award at the 11th Academy Awards for their efforts on the Paramount film Spawn of the North.

Griggs' other Paramount films as cinematographer included the 1954 musical White Christmas, the 1956 Cecil B. DeMille epic The Ten Commandments, and the Jerry Lewis comedies The Sad Sack (1957) and Visit to a Small Planet (1960). He was also the cinematographer on George Stevens' 1965 United Artists release The Greatest Story Ever Told as well as Otto Preminger's World War II drama of that same year, In Harm's Way. His final film was the 1971 American International Pictures comedy Bunny O'Hare starring Bette Davis and Ernest Borgnine.

== Selected filmography ==
- Hot News (1928)
- Shane (1953)
- White Christmas (1954)
- The Ten Commandments (1956)
- The Sad Sack (1957)
- Visit to a Small Planet (1960)
- The Greatest Story Ever Told (1965)
- In Harm's Way (1965)
- Bunny O'Hare (1971)
