= Alex in Wonderland =

1970 film

- Theatrical release poster
- Directed by: Paul Mazursky
- Written by: Paul Mazursky; Larry Tucker
- Produced by: Anthony Ray; Larry Tucker
- Starring: Donald Sutherland; Ellen Burstyn
- Cinematography: László Kovács
- Edited by: Stuart H. Pappé
- Music by: Tom O'Horgan
- Production companies: Coriander; MGM
- Distributed by: MGM
- Release date: December 17, 1970
- Running time: 111 minutes
- Country: United States
- Language: English

Alex in Wonderland is a 1970 American comedy-drama film directed by Paul Mazursky, written with his partner Larry Tucker, starring Donald Sutherland and Ellen Burstyn. Sutherland plays Alex Morrison, a director agonizing over the choice of follow-up project after the success of his first feature film. The situation is similar to the one Mazursky found himself in following the success of Bob & Carol & Ted & Alice (1969) and he casts himself in a role as a new-style Hollywood producer. His daughter Meg Mazursky appears as Amy, one of Morrison's daughters. Noted teacher of improvisational theater Viola Spolin plays Morrison's mother. The film also features cameo appearances by Federico Fellini and Jeanne Moreau, and seems to be inspired by their work. In particular, Fellini's 8½ (1963), about a film director who's artistically stuck, is referenced. Moreau sings two songs on the soundtrack, "Le Vrai Scandale" (for which she wrote the words) and "Le Reve Est La."

== Plot ==
Young director Alex Morrison feels compelled to follow his recent box-office hit with another blockbuster. While mulling over this problem, the director's mind wanders to his past, his present, and probable future.

== Cast ==
- Donald Sutherland as Alex Morrison
- Ellen Burstyn as Beth Morrison
- Paul Mazursky as Hal Stern
- Meg Mazursky as Amy Morrison
- Glenna Sargent as Nancy
- Viola Spolin as Mrs. Morrison
- Andre Philippe as Andre
- Michael Lerner as Leo
- Joan Delaney as Jane
- Neil Burstyn as Norman
- Leon Frederick as Lewis
- Federico Fellini as himself
- Jeanne Moreau as herself

== Reception ==
The film received mixed reviews from critics. Roger Ebert gave the film four stars, writing "the human story does work, remarkably well, and if the movie doesn't hold together we're not disposed to hold that against it." Emanuel Levy was more critical, calling it "arty and pretentious, lacking real wit." Tony Mastroianni of the Cleveland Press gave it a similarly negative review.

In a retrospective review written in 2011, Nathan Rabin of The A.V. Club found the movie to be "pleasant" and suggested that "Studios, audiences, and critics may have expected a major statement after Bob & Carol & Ted & Alice. Instead, Mazursky delivered a pleasant shrug of a movie, an affable afterthought." Time Out described the movie as "intriguing, if deeply flawed."

== See also ==
- List of American films of 1970
