= Harvey Bullock (writer) =

American screenwriter (1921–2006)

Harvey Bullock (born June 4, 1921, in Oxford, North Carolina – died April 24, 2006) was an American television and film writer and producer. His work with R. S. Allen included episodes for The Andy Griffith Show, Hogan's Heroes, Love, American Style, and Alice, along with the films Who's Minding the Mint?, With Six You Get Eggroll and Girl Happy.

== Biography ==
He graduated from Duke University with a Bachelor of Arts in English.

He served with the US Navy in a special operations unit called "Beach Jumpers" during World War II, writing and transmitting false messages over radio in order to deceive the Nazis. After the war, he served stateside in Hawaii.

In 1956, he was married to Betty Jane Folker. Together they had four children: Kerry Scarvie, Diana Bullock, Courtney Bullock and Andy Bullock; and three grandchildren: Sean Bullock, Samantha Scarvie and Andrew Scarvie.

In DC Comics' Batman series, a police officer sharing Bullock's name was named as such as a tribute to Bullock.

Bullock died at the age of 84 on April 24, 2006, due to age-related illness.

== Awards and nominations ==
Bullock (with Allen) received a Random House award in 1956 and were nominated for an Emmy Award in 1976 for a children's program called Papa and Me.

== Television credits ==
- The Andy Griffith Show
- Hogan's Heroes
- The Flintstones
- Top Cat
- The Dick Van Dyke Show
- The Danny Thomas Show
- McKeever and the Colonel
- I Spy
- Gomer Pyle – USMC
- Wait Till Your Father Gets Home
- Alice
- The Love Boat
- The Jetsons
- Return to Mayberry

== Film credits ==
- Honeymoon Hotel
- Girl Happy
- The Man Called Flintstone
- Who's Minding the Mint?
- With Six You Get Eggroll
- Don't Drink the Water

== Book credits ==
- The Fat Book - How to be a happy heavy in a stupid skinny world
- How to Cheat on Your Diet
