= R. S. Allen =

American television and film writer and producer (1924–1981)

Morris Saffian (July 11, 1924 – October 17, 1981), better known by the pseudonyms Ray Saffian (R.S.) Allen, Ray Allen Saffian, and Ray Allen, was an American writer of radio, and television programs and motion picture screenplays, and a television producer.

== Biography ==
Usually collaborating with longtime writing partner Harvey Bullock, Allen co-wrote for a large number of television programs, including The Andy Griffith Show, The Flintstones, Gomer Pyle, U.S.M.C., Hogan's Heroes, and The Love Boat. Allen and Bullock also created the TV series Rango, and wrote the screenplays for the feature films Girl Happy (starring Elvis Presley), The Man Called Flintstone (1966), and Don't Drink the Water (1969), among others. As writer-producers, Allen and Bullock collaborated on shows such as Wait Till Your Father Gets Home, The Love Boat, and Alice.

Allen was a native of New York City. He died in Los Angeles, California at the age of 57.

== Awards and nominations ==
Allen and Bullock received a Random House award in 1956 and were nominated for an Emmy Award in 1976 for a children's program called Papa and Me.

== Television credits ==
- The Andy Griffith Show
- McKeever and the Colonel
- Hogan's Heroes
- The Flintstones
- Top Cat
- The Dick Van Dyke Show
- I Spy
- Gomer Pyle, U.S.M.C.
- Wait Till Your Father Gets Home
- Alice
- The Love Boat
- The Jetsons
- Return to Mayberry
- Love American Style

== Film credits ==
- Honeymoon Hotel
- Girl Happy
- The Hill
- The Man Called Flintstone
- Who's Minding the Mint?
- With Six You Get Eggroll
- Don't Drink the Water
