= Wait Till Your Father Gets Home =

American animated sitcom TV series

- Genre: Animated sitcom
- Created by: R.S. Allen; Harvey Bullock
- Directed by: Peter Luschwitz (1972–1973); Barrie Helmer (1973–1974); Charles A. Nichols (1974)
- Voices of: Tom Bosley; Joan Gerber; Jack Burns; David Hayward; Kristina Holland; Jackie Haley; John Stephenson; Frank Maxwell; Len Weinrib
- Composer: Richard Bowden
- Countries of origin: United States; Australia
- Original language: English
- No. of seasons: 3
- No. of episodes: 48 (list of episodes)

Production
- Executive producers: William Hanna; Joseph Barbera
- Producers: R.S. Allen; Harvey Bullock
- Running time: 22 minutes
- Production company: Hanna-Barbera Productions

Original release
- Network: Syndicated
- Release: September 12, 1972 – October 8, 1974

Wait Till Your Father Gets Home is an American-Australian adult animated sitcom produced by Hanna-Barbera Productions that aired in first-run syndication in the United States from 1972 to 1974. The show was a social commentary focusing around the life of a working-class man and his family, his homemaker wife, his counter culture eldest son, feminist daughter, and business oriented youngest son. The show originated as a one-time segment on Love, American Style called "Love and the Old-Fashioned Father". Critics honed in on the satire depicted in the series. The same pilot was later produced with a live cast (starring Van Johnson), but with no success. The show was the second primetime animated sitcom to run for more than a single season after fellow Hanna-Barbera show The Flintstones in 1960, and would be the only other one until The Simpsons in 1989.

As of 2026, the series airs weeknights on the MeTV Toons channel.

== Premise ==
The show features Harry Boyle, wife Irma, daughter Alice, and sons Chet and Jamie. Harry, a restaurant supply wholesaler, often butts heads with most of his family about the social issues of the day. Contrasting that is Harry's neighbor and friend, Ralph Kane, a paranoid militia fanatic whose extreme opinions and often dangerous actions Harry can barely tolerate as much as his kids' ideas.

Like many animated series created by Hanna-Barbera in the 1970s, the show contained a laugh track created by the studio. For this show, the studio added a third belly laugh to add a little more "variety" (the only TV series made by Hanna-Barbera to have this added laugh). In addition, the laugh track was also slowed considerably. Like The Flintstones and Top Cat, all the episodes feature a cold open, which is a small scene from the episode that takes place in medias res.

== Episodes ==
Season	Episodes	Originally released	
Season	Episodes	First released	Last released
1	24	September 12, 1972	February 20, 1973
2	20	September 11, 1973	January 29, 1974
3	4	September 17, 1974	October 8, 1974

== Voice cast ==
- Tom Bosley as Harry Boyle
- Joan Gerber as Irma Boyle
- Jack Burns as Ralph Kane
- David Hayward as Chet Boyle (eps. 1–14)
- Lennie Weinrib as Chet Boyle (eps. 15–48)
- Kristina Holland as Alice Boyle
- Jackie Earle Haley as Jamie Boyle (eps. 1–11)
- Willie Aames as Jamie Boyle (eps. 12–48)

Other guest characters on the series included thinly disguised versions of celebrities who did not provide their own voices, such as guru Maharishi Mahesh Yogi. When a crooked car salesman appeared in another episode as an obvious parody of well-known Los Angeles car dealer Cal Worthington, Worthington sued Hanna-Barbera, the sponsors (Chevrolet) and the five NBC-owned stations that broadcast the show.

== Home media ==
In 2007, Warner Home Video released Season 1 of Wait Till Your Father Gets Home on DVD in Region 1 for the Hanna-Barbera Classics Collection. Warner Archive Collection released the complete series on Blu-ray on January 28, 2025.

Wait Till Your Father Gets Home: The Complete First Season
Set details	Special features	Release dates
24 episodes; 528 minutes; 4-disc set; 4:3 standard	Retrospective look at the classic show	Region 1 (DVD); June 5, 2007
Wait Till Your Father Gets Home: The Complete Series
Set details	Special features	Release dates
48 episodes; 6-disc set; 4:3 standard	Retrospective Featurettes: "Animation for the Nation" & "Illustrating the Times"	Region A (Blu-ray); January 28, 2025

== See also ==
- List of works produced by Hanna-Barbera Productions
