= Alister Williamson =

Australian-born actor (1918–1999)

- Alister Williamson in The Saint 1962
- Born: Duncan Mcfarlane Williamson; 17 June 1918; Sydney, New South Wales, Australia
- Died: 19 May 1999 (aged 80); Slough, Berkshire, England

Alister Williamson (17 June 1918 – 19 May 1999) was an Australian-born character actor, who appeared in many British films and television series of the 1960s and 1970s. A big, craggy-faced man, he would usually be found playing gruff police inspectors or henchmen in adventure series and police dramas of the period. He was also notable as a supporting player in a number of classic British horror films.

He would typically be found in television series such as Adam Adamant Lives!, The Avengers, Paul Temple, Police Surgeon, Public Eye, The Saint, Softly, Softly, Special Branch, The Third Man and Z-Cars. He also made appearances in many popular sitcoms of the period, such as Please Sir!, Dad's Army, The Galton and Simpson Playhouse, George and Mildred, The Likely Lads, Man About the House and That's My Boy.

In films he often appeared in the horror genre, either as policemen or landlords for companies such as Hammer Studios, Amicus and AIP throughout the 1960s and early 1970s. His credits include The Curse of the Werewolf (1961), The Evil of Frankenstein (1963), The Gorgon (1964) and The Deadly Bees (1966). In 1969 he appeared in Gordon Hessler's The Oblong Box, in which he would have his only leading role opposite stars Vincent Price and Christopher Lee. In a part originally earmarked for Price, he played the disfigured Sir Edward Markham, acting underneath a red velvet hood until the film's climatic unmasking. Unfortunately his voice was deemed unsuitable and he was redubbed for the film's release, after which it was back to a supporting role in his next horror film, The Abominable Dr. Phibes (1971).

== Selected filmography ==
- Hell Is a City (1960) - Sam
- Saturday Night and Sunday Morning (1960) - Policeman
- The Sundowners (1960) - Shearer (uncredited)
- The Curse of the Werewolf (1961) - Policeman (uncredited)
- The Pot Carriers (1962) - Escorting Prison Officer
- The Brain (1962) - Inspector Pike (uncredited)
- On the Beat (1962) - Detective (uncredited)
- Man in the Middle (1964) - Sgt. Johnson
- The Evil of Frankenstein (1964) - Landlord (uncredited)
- Crooks in Cloisters (1964) - Mungo
- The Gorgon (1964) - Janus Cass
- The Lift (1965) - Mr. Maxwell
- The Return of Mr. Moto (1965) - Maiter d'Hotel
- The Deadly Bees (1966) - Inspector
- The Last Shot You Hear (1969) - CID Man
- The Oblong Box (1969) - Edward
- Battle of Britain (1969) - Air Raid Warden (uncredited)
- The Abominable Dr. Phibes (1971) - 1st Policeman
