= It Was a Dark and Stormy Night (play) =

It Was a Dark and Stormy Night is a dark comedic play written by American playwright Tim Kelly about a number of guests who become trapped in a New England Inn. The play won the Robert J. Pickering Award for Play writing Excellence, and was first published in 1988. The title is a nod to the famous phrase written by Edward Bulwer-Lytton, "It was a dark and stormy night."

== Overview ==
The play is set during a storm in Massachusetts. Guests continue to happen upon the infamously isolated Ye Olde Wayside Inn, bringing them upon the acquaintances of Hepzibah, Arabella, and Ebenezer Saltmarsh, their Uncle Silas, and the hired girl, Olive. The guests of the Inn continue to follow the mystery of Olive, the peculiar nurse, Ebenezer and his obsession with "Effie", the crazy Saltmarsh sisters, and their late ancestor, "The General".

== Characters ==
- HEPZIBAH SALTMARSH, eccentric sister of Arabella and cousin to Ebenezer, old
- ARABELLA, also eccentric, less old
- OLIVE, the hired girl, outlandish
- EBENEZER, insane Saltmarsh cousin
- JANE ADAMS, job applicant and thief
- MARY SHAW, job applicant
- SNELL, state trooper
- ED PERKINS, cab driver and college student
- DOROTHY BLAKE, Mary's younger sister, friend of Ed
- BELLE MALIBU, vital witness
- DAWSON, detective, Belle's police escort
- UNCLE SILAS, oldest maniac in Massachusetts
- SMILING SAM, the beauty man
- EUPHEMIA, aspiring nurse
