= The House in Nightmare Park =

1973 British film by Peter Sykes

- UK theatrical poster
- Directed by: Peter Sykes
- Screenplay by: Clive Exton; Terry Nation
- Produced by: Clive Exton; Terry Nation executive Beryl Vertue
- Starring: Frankie Howerd; Ray Milland; Hugh Burden; Kenneth Griffith
- Cinematography: Ian Wilson
- Edited by: Bill Blunden
- Music by: Harry Robinson
- Production companies: Associated London Films; Extonation Productions
- Distributed by: Anglo-EMI
- Release date: 23 March 1973
- Running time: 100 minutes
- Country: United Kingdom
- Language: English

The House in Nightmare Park (U.S. titles: Crazy House and The House of the Laughing Dead) is a 1973 British comedy horror film directed by Peter Sykes and starring Frankie Howerd, Ray Milland and Hugh Burden. It was one of a number of British comedy films which parodied the successful British horror genre, closely associated with the Hammer Horror films. Its plot follows that of a traditional "Old Dark House" story.

A struggling actor is hired to perform a dramatic reading at a country house. The people who hired him have ulterior motives.

== Plot ==
In 1907 struggling actor Foster Twelvetrees is invited to a large country home by Stewart Henderson to perform a dramatic reading for his family. Outwardly, Stewart is complimentary and enthusiastic, but his more sinister intentions were made clear when earlier he secretly sliced a poster of Twelvetrees. Whilst they chat, Stewart's sister Jessica and their Indian servant Patel begin searching through Twelvetrees' luggage. Twelvetrees nevertheless responds with an unintentional wit and bumbling characteristic throughout the rest of the film.

After they send him to bed, Stewart and Jessica talk cryptically about not being able to find something in his luggage and concluding he must have it elsewhere. Later on Twelvetrees is chided by Stewart for nearly walking in on a restricted room – Stewart explains his ill brother Victor is in there. Then during his sleep Twelvetrees is woken to a commotion downstairs: Stewart's other brother Reggie and his daughter Verity have arrived with Reggie demanding his regular allowance from Victor. Spying on the proceedings Twelvetrees spots Stewart going elsewhere to see his mother.

The next day, after being introduced to a snake house underground, Twelvetrees secretly goes upstairs to see Stewart's mother: though kept behind a locked door she initially seems extremely polite. She explains her family's history of theatrics in India. Suddenly, she tries to kill Twelvetrees with a knife but he is saved by Patel – the servant explains her presence there is secret lest she be taken away. Though very unnerved, Twelvetrees is persuaded by Stewart to stay to perform that evening.

Before doing so another brother arrives; Ernest and his wife Aggie arrive to demand his regular allowance – both he and Reggie have found their cheques from Victor have been bouncing. Suspicious that Stewart is trying to change Victor's will to his favour, Reggie and Ernest resolve to stay and make sure that doesn't happen. In the meantime, Verity persuades Twelvetrees to check up on Victor, and to their shock discover the bed in his room is filled by a dummy. Confronted, Stewart tells Reggie and Ernest that Victor is dead and reveals another secret: Twelvetrees is in fact Victor's secret son and that he is entitled to everything in Victor's will. Plus, Stewart is convinced Twelvetrees unknowingly has a clue to where a batch of diamonds are hidden on the estate. Ernest and Aggie, after their own search, are convinced they have found the clue is a framed misquoted motto and plan to kill Twelvetrees with poison: Stewart foils the plan and works out that they know whatever the clue must be. Later that evening during a Henderson family performance, Ernest is killed with a stab to the back.

Petrified, Twelvetrees makes a hasty exit only to be pursued by Verity: she convinces him to come back after she reveals the true identity of his father and his place in his will: he is in line to take over his money, the house and its estates. Whilst confronting his uncles, Foster is told by Verity about the diamonds, their secret location and the fact he might be in possession of a clue to their location. Whilst he goes for the police Foster gets lost in the forest and eventually finds Patel: he tells him to go in his place. However, having taken some of his clothes, Patel is mistaken by the Henderson mother and she kills him as he walks through the woods.

Going back to the house, Foster meets up with Verity again to find Jessica – in possession of his framed motto – and Agnes dead by the snakehouse. Foster explains he received the motto in the post and Verity notices it's inaccurate. Explaining that it came with a birth certificate, Verity concludes the clue must be in his name. Foster goes to get it – learning his real name is Nigel Anthony Julian Amadeus Henderson – but comes back to Verity on the floor. Reggie walks in immediately and says she's dead. Foster, left alone, works out the clue: his initials form naja – a genus of snake, and he finds a package in the snake house. Confronted then by Stewart – Reggie having been killed in the interim – Foster refuses to hand it over and a violent chase ensues, but Foster traps Stewart with his mother. Downstairs, Foster is confronted by an alive Verity pointing a gun at him. She demands the diamonds and he unwraps the package, throwing the covering paper into the fire. However, the document inside reveals the covering paper was actually the map to the diamonds hidden in the estate, by the time they realize the map is already burned away. The film ends with Stewart, Verity and the Henderson mother being taken away in a police cart, whilst a camera shot moves away from Foster beginning to dig in the large grounds outside the house to find the diamonds.

== Cast ==
- Frankie Howerd as Foster Twelvetrees
- Ray Milland as Stewart Henderson
- Hugh Burden as Reggie Henderson
- Kenneth Griffith as Ernest Henderson
- John Bennett as Patel
- Rosalie Crutchley as Jessica Henderson
- Ruth Dunning as Agnes Henderson
- Elizabeth MacLennan as Verity Henderson
- Aimée Delamain as mother
- Peter Munt as cabbie

== Production ==
The film was made by Beryl Vertue whose company Associated London Scripts (ALS) had a deal with Anglo-EMI films under Nat Cohen. She had made some popular movies with Frankie Howerd, including Up Pompei, Up the Chastity Belt and Up the Front.

Peter Sykes said he was offered the film by producer Clive Exton off the back of Demons of the Mind.

Frankie Howerd later said it was "the film I enjoyed making the most... because it was a comedy thriller and I like that kind of film." He added:

"The only difficult thing about it involved swamps. It was very physically gruelling to make because I was being chased upstairs and downstairs, ran through swamps, and was generally kicked around. I had to work three days in a pit of live snakes so it was a very tough film to make. But having said that, I enjoyed making the film because it was a good part and good parts don’t come along all that often. It had a good director (Peter Sykes) and if any actor has a really good part to play then he’s happy. A comedian is always happy to have a good script he has confidence in. There is nothing worse than having a bad script, knowing it’s a bad script, and having to make the most of it.”

Filming took place at Pinewood Studios over six weeks from 6 November to 16 December 1972.

Howerd wrote in his memoirs, "the film received the first unanimously good Press I’d had for a picture in a long, long time. You expect, naturally, some divergence of opinion, but as I recall it, not one critic panned The House In Nightmare Park."

Howerd's biographer opined that the film, while among the actor's best, "did not, however, change the course of his career. It did not spirit him off from Cricklewood to Hollywood. It amounted to nothing more, but also nothing less, than an intriguing and rather engaging interlude before he resumed his regular work in other, more familiar, media."

== Critical reception ==
The Monthly Film Bulletin wrote: "The House in Nightmare Park shows every sign of having been put together with intelligence and polish. The film is elegantly photographed, and the minor comic characters are all effective within certain limits; but despite the care that has evidently gone into the production, it never successfully resolves the central discrepancy between Frankie Howerd's vaudevillian technique and the Gothic setting in which he is placed. The two elements co-exist uneasily for the first twenty minutes and then begin to clash, most noticeably at the climax, where one is frequently being asked to accept Howerd as an amiable hero figure, with the result that the action simply degenerates into farce. ... Consequently, the comedian's presence swamps the production. And despite all the makers' efforts to create a solid and exciting framework in which he can operate, it's difficult to see how it could have been otherwise. The film remains above average as a comedy vehicle but, considering its highly talented production team, it could have been much more."

Leslie Halliwell said: "Standard creepy house comedy thriller, well enough done though it would have been better with Bob Hope."

The Guardian said the filmmakers "obviously tried for more than the routine comedy and have, at least in part, succeeded."
