= Murders in the Rue Morgue (1971 film) =

British mystery horror film by Gordon Hessler

- US film poster
- Directed by: Gordon Hessler
- Written by: Christopher Wicking; Henry Slesar
- Based on: "The Murders in the Rue Morgue" (1841 story) by Edgar Allan Poe
- Produced by: Louis M. Heyward
- Starring: Jason Robards; Christine Kaufmann; Herbert Lom; Adolfo Celi; Michael Dunn; Lilli Palmer
- Cinematography: Manuel Berenguer
- Edited by: Max Benedict
- Music by: Waldo de los Ríos
- Production company: AIP-England, Ltd.
- Distributed by: Anglo-EMI Film Distributors (UK)
- Release date: 21 July 1971 (Philadelphia)
- Running time: 87 minutes
- Country: United Kingdom
- Language: English
- Budget: $700,000

Murders in the Rue Morgue (also known as Edgar Allan Poe's Murders in the Rue Morgue) is a 1971 British mystery horror film directed by Gordon Hessler, loosely based on Edgar Allan Poe's 1841 short story. It stars Jason Robards, Christine Kaufmann, Herbert Lom, Adolfo Celi, Michael Dunn and Lilli Palmer. The film was produced by the British branch of American International Pictures (AIP), and is the final film of AIP's "Poe cycle".

The film departs from Poe's original story in several significant aspects, at times more resembling Gaston Leroux's The Phantom of the Opera and incorporating the historical character Eugène François Vidocq, as well as introducing metatextual elements. Filming took place entirely in Spain, with the musical score written by Waldo de los Ríos.

Murders in the Rue Morgue was released by AIP on July 21, 1971, and received mixed-to-negative reviews from critics. According to Gordon Hessler, the film was heavily re-edited by producers before its release.

== Plot ==
In early-20th century Paris, a theatre troupe is specializing in gory, naturalistic horror plays in the fashion of the Grand Guignol, under the direction of Cesar Charron.

Charron is presenting Poe's "The Murders in the Rue Morgue". Cesar's wife, the actress Madeline, whose mother had been murdered by axe, is haunted by nightmares of an axe-wielding man. Then, suddenly, Rene Marot, a former lover of Madeline's mother thought long dead after being horribly disfigured on stage, mysteriously returns and begins murdering members and ex-members of the acting troupe, confounding the Paris police, who initially suspect Cesar.

== Cast ==
- Jason Robards as Cesar Charron
- Herbert Lom as Rene Marot
- Christine Kaufmann as Madeleine Charron
  - Inma de Santis as young Madeline
- Adolfo Celi as Inspector Vidocq
- Maria Perschy as Genevre
- Michael Dunn as Pierre Triboulet
- Lilli Palmer as Mrs. Charron
- Peter Arne as Aubert
- Rosalind Elliot as Gabrielle
- Marshall Jones as Luigi Orsini
- María Martín as Madam Adolphe
- Dean Selmier as Jacques
- Virginia Stach as Lucie
- Ruth Plattes and Xan das Bolas as Orsini's assistants
- Brooke Adams as Nurse (uncredited)

== Production ==
=== Development ===
Gordon Hessler was hired to direct the film. Hessler said that he felt the story was so familiar it needed to be changed, so he and writer Christopher Wicking decided to do it as a play-within-a-play, with a mystery happening around a theatre that was putting on a production of "The Murders in the Rue Morgue". The new storyline borrowed plot elements of The Phantom of the Opera. In a DVD interview, Hessler said that he felt it necessary to reinvent the plot as he believed the majority of audiences were too familiar with Poe's story.

=== Casting ===
Hessler said that Vincent Price "was very upset that he wasn't in" the film "but I had nothing to do with that." He thought that Price was having contractual fights with American International Pictures (AIP) at the time. Hessler said that AIP hired Jason Robards "because of his name, and he was quite well respected. Most actors like to play a horror part at some point in their life, so he was brought onboard."

Brooke Adams made her film debut, in a bit part as a nurse.

=== Filming ===
Principal photography began in October 1970. As a cost-cutting measure, filming took place in Toledo and Madrid, Spain. The theatre scenes were shot at Teatro Rojas, while the Charron estate was portrayed by the Palace of the Dukes of Osuna. Hessler commented that it was easier to film in Spain, as "You couldn't shoot that in London unless you built sets."

Hessler said that Robards was "fine to work with" but, two weeks into filming, he told Hessler that he had the wrong part and wanted to be doing the other part. Hessler would have been happy to give him the other role, but by then it was too late. "It's always the monster who gets the best part in a horror picture, it's much more juicy", said Hessler.

"We may have had too much fun", said Robards after production. "It's hard to tell."

=== Editing ===
Gordon Hessler said that James H. Nicholson liked the film when he saw it in Spain. The director says he felt "it was one of the best films I had ever made." However, the film was drastically edited in the United States. Hessler said that he was "appalled when I originally saw the theatrically released version." He wrote a five-page letter to Samuel Arkoff complaining about the changes made, but by then the film was already in release.

Among the changes that Hessler disliked were removing a sequence from the end of the film and tinting the flashback scenes. "The whole idea was not to tint them so that you wouldn't know when you're more or less in a dream sequence or just being puzzled by it," said Hessler. "The whole trick in that was instead of it being a flashback, this would be a flash-forward, which people really hadn't done before at that time. It was a premonition of what was going to happen. When it's tinted, it's just so obvious. Audiences picked up on it immediately."

AIP also removed a lot of Lilli Palmer's scenes. "She was vital to the plot and by cutting her scenes down, it was like she was an extra in the film", said Hessler.

=== Music ===
The musical score was written by Argentine composer Waldo de los Ríos.

== Release ==
Murders in the Rue Morgue was released in the United States in the summer of 1971, premiering in Philadelphia on July 21.

=== Home media ===
The film was released on DVD as a double feature with Cry of the Banshee on April 15, 2003.

Scream Factory released the film as a double feature on Blu-ray with The Dunwich Horror (1970) in 2016. This edition went out-of-print in May 2020.

The 2026 Hammer 4K Blu-ray re-release includes restored versions of both the original director's cut, and the AIP theatrical version.

== Reception ==
=== Critical response ===
Murders in the Rue Morgue received mixed to negative reviews from critics. Leonard Maltin panned the film, awarding the film 1 1/2 out of 4 stars. Howard Thompson from The New York Times gave the film a positive review, praising the film's direction, costume design, color, and performances. Thompson did, however, note that the film's ending, while sound, was fairly predictable.

Donald Guarisco from Allmovie gave the film a negative review, criticizing the film's substandard pacing, convoluted plot, performances, and lack of actual tension, writing "This riff on the famous Edgar Allen [sic] Poe story has an intriguing, experimental edge to it but is not fully successful at reinventing the Poe subgenre".

Jason Robards later called the film "a disaster... but I got a good price and part of the picture."

== See also ==
- List of American films of 1971

== Sources ==
- Maltin, Leonard (2012). Leonard Maltin's 2013 Movie Guide. New York, New York: Penguin Press. ISBN 978-0-451-23774-3.
- Weaver, Tom (2000). Return of the B Science Fiction and Horror Heroes: The Mutant Melding of Two Volumes of Classic Interviews. Jefferson, North Carolina: McFarland. ISBN 978-0-7864-0755-2.
- Hamilton, John (2022). Witches, B*tches and Banshees: The British Films of American International. Little Shoppe of Horrors. ISBN 979-8416552794.
