= Louis M. Heyward =

American film producer (1920–2002)

- Born: Louis Mortimere Horowitz; June 24, 1920; New York City, New York
- Died: March 26, 2002 (aged 81); Los Angeles, California

Louis M. "Deke" Heyward (born Louis Mortimere Horowitz, June 24, 1920 – March 26, 2002) was an American producer and film and television screenwriter.

== Life and career ==
Born in New York City to Henry Horowitz and Rose Klein, Jewish immigrants from Hungary, Heyward intended to become a lawyer but started writing radio scripts part-time. He attended New York University and Brooklyn Law School. He then served in the United States Army Air Forces for six years. In 1942, he was a lieutenant stationed at Midland Army Flying School in Midland, Texas and was a bombardier instructor. In May 1943, he transferred to the bombardier school at Webb Air Force Base in Big Spring, Texas.

After serving in the Army Air Forces, he resumed writing for radio while working at Associated Press. He changed his last name to Heyward in 1946.

In 1947 he was appointed head of television and radio at Mogul.

=== Writer ===
After he changed his name, he became a full-time comedy writer, providing scripts for eight seasons (1950–1958) of The Garry Moore Show. He also wrote material for The Ernie Kovacs Show, eventually becoming head writer for that series and winning a Sylvania Award for comedy writing. He was nominated for an Emmy in 1957.

Heyward wrote scripts for Winky Dink and You, a children's show hosted by Jack Barry that ran on CBS from 1953 – 1957, that was created by Harry Prichett and Edwin Brit Wyckoff. The show is considered one of the first interactive TV shows.

He worked on The Dick Clark Show (1960) as a writer and producer.

== American International Pictures ==
In the early 1960s, Heyward relocated to Los Angeles and worked various executive positions at 20th Century Fox, Music Corporation of America, and Four Star Television. His production experience at Fox and MCA and his proven penchant for comedy was noticed by James H. Nicholson of American International Pictures who asked Heyward if he was interested in writing a comedy for the studio.

Heyward's first credit for American International Pictures was Pajama Party (1964), one of many Beach Party films made by the company. Heyward would subsequently write several more similar teen-themed AIP comedies, as well as horror films and science fiction thrillers. His best known work includes Dr Goldfoot and the Bikini Machine. Heyward also began to be involved on the production side of things for AIP.

== Head of American International Pictures London ==
In 1966, Heyward was made AIP's Director of Overseas Productions, and set up a London-based office of operations in 1967. He produced several European and British films from 1967 to 1972, all co-financed by AIP with Heyward maintaining a degree of control over the various productions in order to ensure the movies were suitable for release in both the U.S. and European markets. In this capacity, he assisted in the production of some of AIP's most critically acclaimed and profitable films of that period, including Michael Reeves's Witchfinder General (1968), The Abominable Dr. Phibes (1971), and Dr. Phibes Rises Again (1972), all starring Vincent Price. He left AIP in 1972.

== Later years with Four Star International and Hanna-Barbera ==
After his AIP days, Heyward served as Vice President of Development for Four Star International while it was led by David Charnay. While Heyward was with Charnay, he gained the vital leadership experience and contacts to then become a Senior Vice President for Hanna-Barbera, where he was in charge of live programming and movies of the week.

After his time with Hanna-Barbera, Heyward became vice president in Charge of Development for Barry & Enright Productions, a game show and TV-movie production company run by Jack Barry and Dan Enright. He served as Executive Producer of the company's popular Tic Tac Dough.

== Personal life ==
Heyward died of pneumonia on March 26, 2002, in Los Angeles.

He was survived by a wife, Sandra, children Patti and Andy, and three grandchildren, Robert, Michael, and Bianca. Andy was known as the chairman and chief executive officer of animation studio, DiC Entertainment, until its June 20, 2008, acquisition by and subsequent folding into Cookie Jar Group.

== Select filmography ==
- The Garry Moore Show (1950s) (TV series) - writer
- Winky Dink and You (1950s) (TV series) - writer
- The Ernie Kovacs Show (1950s) (TV series) - writer, producer
- The Big Fun Carnival (1957) - writer, producer
- 77 Sunset Strip (TV series) - writer
- The Dick Clark Show (1959) (TV series) - producer
- Pajama Party (1964) - writer
- War Gods of the Deep (1965) - writer
- Sergeant Deadhead (1965) - writer
- Dr. Goldfoot and the Bikini Machine (1965) - writer
- Planet of the Vampires (1965) - writer
- Spy in Your Eye (1965) - executive producer, writer
- Die, Monster, Die!(1965) - producer (uncredited)
- The Wild Weird World of Dr. Goldfoot (1965) (TV special) - writer, producer
- War Italian Style (1965) - executive producer
- Bang! Bang! You're Dead! (1966) producer _uncredited)
- Dr. Goldfoot and the Girl Bombs (1966) - writer, producer
- The Ghost in the Invisible Bikini (1966) - writer
- The Glass Sphinx (1967) - writer, producer
- Those Fantastic Flying Fools (1967) - producer (uncredited)
- House of 1,000 Dolls (1967) - executive producer
- Witchfinder General (1968) - producer, writer additional scenes
- The Crimson Cult (1968) - producer, writer
- Rio 70 (1969) - producer (uncredited)
- The Oblong Box (1969) - executive producer
- Horror House (1969) - producer (uncredited)
- De Sade (1969) - executive producer
- Scream and Scream Again (1970) - executive producer
- The Vampire Lovers (1970) - associate producer (uncredited)
- Cry of the Banshee (1970) - producer
- Wuthering Heights (1970) - executive producer
- Whoever Slew Auntie Roo? (1970) - executive producer
- Dagmar's Hot Pants (1971) - writer
- The Abominable Dr. Phibes (1971) - producer
- Murdes in the Rue Morgue (1971) - producer
- Dr. Phibes Rises Again (1972) - producer
- Tales of the Haunted (1981) (TV movie) - writer
- Tic Tac Dough (1990s) (TV series) - producer

=== Productions Made While Executive in Charge of Production at Hanna-Barbera ===
- Yabba Dabba Doo! The Happy World of Hanna-Barbera (1977) - documentary
- The Gathering (1977) (TV movie)
- All-Star Comedy Ice Revue (1978) (TV special)
- Kiss Meets the Phantom of the Park (1978)
- Legends of the Superheroes (1979) (TV series)
- C.H.O.M.P.S. (1979)

=== Novels ===
- Grandpa and the Girls (1960)
- My Son the Doctor (1963)
