= Medusa (1973 film) =

- Directed by: Gordon Hessler
- Written by: Christopher Wicking
- Produced by: George Hamilton
- Starring: George Hamilton; Luciana Paluzzi; Cameron Mitchell; Alana Stewart
- Cinematography: Dimitris Papakonstadis
- Edited by: Aristeidis Karydis-Fuchs
- Music by: Theodore Roubanis
- Production companies: Roubanis and Company
- Distributed by: American National Enterprises
- Release date: July 23, 1973 (Italy)
- Running time: 103 minutes
- Countries: Greece; United Kingdom
- Language: English

Medusa is a 1973 British-Greek mystery drama film starring and produced by George Hamilton directed by Gordon Hessler. It was co written by Christopher Wicking, the last of five collaborations he had with Hessler. It was Hamilton's second film as producer (the first being Evel Knievel) and was shot in Greece.

== Plot ==
A stewardess is murdered by a masked man in Greece. The leading suspects are an American playboy and a gangster.

== Cast ==
- George Hamilton as Jeffrey
- Luciana Paluzzi as Sarah
- Cameron Mitchell as Angelo
- Alana Stewart as Eleana
- Nora Valsami as Stewardess
- Thodoros Roubanis as Nikos
- Takis Kavouras as Inspector
- Paris Dimoleon as David
