= Skyway to Death =

1974 film directed by Gordon Hessler

- Genre: Adventure; Thriller
- Written by: Michael Scheff (uncredited); David Spector
- Directed by: Gordon Hessler
- Starring: Ross Martin; Stefanie Powers; Bobby Sherman
- Music by: Lee Holdridge
- Country of origin: United States
- Original language: English

Production
- Producer: Lou Morheim
- Cinematography: J.J. Jones
- Editor: Bud Hoffman
- Production company: Universal Television

Original release
- Network: ABC
- Release: January 19, 1974

Skyway to Death is a 1974 American TV film directed by Gordon Hessler, first broadcast for the ABC Movie of the Week anthology series.

== Plot ==
The passengers in an aerial tramway are trapped when the tramway breaks down 8500 feet in the air.

== Cast ==
- Bobby Sherman as Barney Taylor
- Ross Martin as Martin Leonard
- Stefanie Powers as Nancy Sorenson
- John Astin as Andrew Tustin
- Tige Andrews as Sam Nichols
- Nancy Malone as Ann Leonard
- Billy Green Bush as Walter Benson
- Joseph Campanella as Bob Parsons
- David Sheiner as Bill Carter
- Ruth McDevitt as Aunt Louise
- Severn Darden as Steve Kramer
- Lissa Morrow as Kathy Reed

== Reception ==
The Los Angeles Times called it "a watered down version" of a disaster movie with performances "far better than the material".
