= The Trollenberg Terror =

1958 film by Quentin Lawrence

- Theatrical release poster
- Directed by: Quentin Lawrence
- Screenplay by: Jimmy Sangster
- Story by: Peter Key
- Based on: The Trollenberg Terror; 1956 TV serial
- Produced by: Robert S. Baker; Monty Berman
- Starring: Forrest Tucker; Laurence Payne; Jennifer Jayne
- Cinematography: Monty Berman
- Edited by: Henry Richardson
- Music by: Stanley Black
- Production company: Tempean Films
- Distributed by: Eros Films
- Release dates: 7 July 1958 (United States); October 1958 (United Kingdom)
- Running time: 84 minutes
- Country: United Kingdom
- Language: English

The Trollenberg Terror (U.S. title: The Crawling Eye; also known as Creatures from Another World) is a 1958 British science fiction horror film produced by Robert S. Baker and Monty Berman and directed by Quentin Lawrence (in his directorial debut). The film stars Forrest Tucker, Laurence Payne, Janet Munro, and Jennifer Jayne. The special effects are by Les Bowie. The story is based on a 1956 British ITV "Saturday Serial" television programme written by George F. Kerr, Jack Cross and Giles Cooper under the collective pseudonym of "Peter Key".

The film was first released as The Crawling Eye in the United States on 7 July 1958 by Distributors Corporation of America, and released later in the United Kingdom as The Trollenberg Terror on October 7, 1958 by Eros Films. It played on a double bill with the British science fiction film The Strange World of Planet X, which was retitled Cosmic Monsters for its U.S. release.

The Trollenberg Terror's storyline concerns United Nations troubleshooter Alan Brooks, later joined by journalist Philip Truscott, investigating unusual accidents occurring in the area of a resort hotel on the fictional Mount Trollenberg in Switzerland. Brooks suspects that these deaths are related to a series of similar incidents which occurred three years earlier in the Andes Mountains, which involved an unexplained radioactive cloud formation believed by locals to be inhabited.

== Plot ==
On the Swiss mountain Trollenberg, one of three climbers is suddenly killed, his head ripped from his body. Two sisters, Anne and Sarah Pilgrim, a London mind-reading act, are travelling by train to Geneva when Anne faints as the train passes the mountain. Upon waking, Anne insists that they must get off at the next stop.

UN troubleshooter Alan Brooks, in the same train compartment as the sisters, is going to Trollenberg's observatory to meet with Professor Crevett. Crevett goes on to explain that, despite a series of climbing accidents, no bodies are ever found, and an always-stationary radioactive cloud is regularly observed on the mountain's south face. Brooks mentions similar incidents that took place in South America in the Andes three years earlier, just before a similar radioactive cloud vanished without a trace. Local rumors circulated that something was alive in the heavy mist of the cloud.

Anne is giving a mind-reading demonstration at the nearby hotel when she "sees" two men in a base camp hut on the mountain. Dewhurst is asleep when the other man, Brett, under some kind of mental compulsion, walks outside as the cloud envelopes the hut. Anne suddenly faints again. Brooks phones the hut, Dewhurst answers, screams, and then the connection suddenly goes dead.

A rescue party, including Brooks, climbs up to the camp hut looking for both men. Anne, in a trance-like state, urges the rescuers to stay away. Inside the hut, the rescuers discover that everything is frozen solid, despite the door being locked from the inside. Dewhurst's body is found under a bed with his head missing. A spotter plane arrives and circles overhead, and a man is spotted a half mile away. The first rescuer finds a rucksack at that location with a severed head inside. He is set upon and killed by Brett, who also kills the second rescuer when he arrives.

Later at the hotel, Brett suddenly staggers in, claiming that he had been lost on the mountain. Soon after, he attacks Anne with a knife, but Brooks manages to subdue him. Brett sustains a severe head gash during the struggle, but no blood flows from the wound. He is heavily sedated and locked away. Brooks recalls to journalist Philip Truscott a similar incident in the Andes that followed a similar pattern: a man murdered an elderly woman who allegedly had psychic abilities like those displayed by Anne. The killer's body was discovered to have been dead for at least 24 hours prior to his murder of the old woman. Brett escapes his improvised cell and resumes his hunt for Anne, this time armed with a handaxe. Before he can reach her, Brooks dispatches him with a pistol. Brett's flesh appears crystallized upon inspection and rapidly decomposes in the heat.

The cloud has begun to move down the mountainside towards the hotel, so the guests retreat up to the fortified observatory. A mother realizes that her young daughter is missing as they enter the cable car. In a thickening mist, a giant tentacled alien creature with a single huge eye appears at the hotel, smashing down the front door. Brooks manages to rescue the child from the lobby, both of them narrowly escaping. They return to the cable car, but the delay gives the mist a chance to reach the car platform. The transport motor begins to freeze, starting and stopping, the cable slipping, but the cable car arrives safely. The single cloud has now split into five while converging on the observatory.

Hans, who left the hotel by car, suddenly turns up at the observatory. Once inside, he begins exhibiting the same obsession with Anne. Hans tries to strangle her, but Brooks and Truscott stop him as Brooks stabs him. As the aliens near the observatory, everyone makes Molotov cocktails to combat them. By radio, Alan orders an aerial firebombing raid against the observatory, which has reinforced walls and concrete roof that can withstand the assault.

Truscott strikes one of the creatures with a Molotov cocktail, setting it ablaze. He is caught by a tentacle from another monster now atop the observatory's roof. Brooks sets that one ablaze with another Molotov cocktail, forcing it to drop Truscott. Later, Truscott firebombs another creature that manages to breach a portion of thick wall to get at Anne. The aerial firebombing assault with an English Electric Canberra begins and successfully torches the remaining aliens.

== Cast ==
- Forrest Tucker as Alan Brooks
- Laurence Payne† as Philip Truscott
- Jennifer Jayne as Sarah Pilgrim
- Janet Munro as Anne Pilgrim
- Warren Mitchell as Professor Crevett
- Frederick Schiller as Mayor Klein
- Andrew Faulds as Brett
- Stuart Saunders† as Dewhurst
- Colin Douglas as Hans
- Derek Sydney as Wilde
- Richard Golding as first villager
- George Herbert as second villager
- Anne Sharp as German woman
- Leslie Heritage as Carl
- Jeremy Longhurst as first student climber
- Anthony Parker as second student climber
- Theodore Wilhelm as Fritz
- Garard Green as pilot
- Caroline Glaser as little girl

† Reprising role from TV version.

== Production ==
The Trollenberg Terror was the final film shot at Southall Studios, one of the earliest pioneer film studios in the United Kingdom, and was one of the last films released by Distributors Corporation of America.

Mitchell's role was originally meant to be played by Anton Diffring, but Diffring pulled out of the part at the last minute. It was an early film role for Janet Munro.

== Release ==
The Trollenberg Terror was released in the United States on July 7, 1958. It received an October 1958 release in Britain.

== Reception ==
The Monthly Film Bulletin wrote: "Several sequences in this Alpine science fiction production are genuinely alarming, although much more could have been made of the dramatic moments. The film gives the impression of having been shot and edited in a great hurry and the characteristic addiction to close-ups of such details as severed heads and melting flesh is more in evidence than in most science fiction pieces. More accomplished direction might have resulted in a film as effective as the Quatermass film series".

In the 1 January 1959 issue of The New York Times, film critic Richard W. Nason reviewed the double feature starring Forrest Tucker and opined that "...The Crawling Eye and The Cosmic Monsters do nothing to enhance or advance the copious genre of science fiction".

The Radio Times Guide to Films gave the film 2/5 stars, writing: "Efficiently suspenseful British cheapie marred by awful special effects. Two bits of cotton wool stuck on a mountain photo make do for the cloudy snowscapes in veteran Hammer scriptwriter Jimmy Sangster's screen version of the BBC [sic] TV series. Forrest Tucker is miscast as the hero, but Janet Munro is affecting as the telepathic heroine the aliens seize as their mouthpiece."

Film historian and critic Leonard Maltin considered The Trollenberg Terror as "ok, if predictable", a feature that showed its humble origins, being adapted by Jimmy Sangster from the British TV series (also called The Trollenberg Terror) about cloud-hiding alien invaders on a Swiss mountaintop. Maltin noted that the film was "hampered by low-grade special effects".

== In popular culture ==
The main title music from The Crawling Eye was featured on the album Greatest Science Fiction Hits V by Neil Norman and his Cosmic Orchestra, released in 1979 on GNP Crescendo Records.

The Trollenberg Terror was one of the inspirations for writer/director John Carpenter's 1980 horror film The Fog.

In Stephen King's 1986 horror novel It, one of the protagonists, Richie Tozier, watches the film and it terrifies him. A crawling-eye creature later appears as a manifestation of Pennywise, the novel's title monster.

A scene of the film was briefly seen in the 1998 film Small Soldiers.

The Freakazoid episode "The Cloud" spoofed the film's opening credits, as well as key elements of the plot, though with the victims being turned into clowns instead of being killed.

A song called "Crawling Eye" was featured on American horror punk band the Misfits' 1999 album Famous Monsters; the song's lyrics directly reference the plot of the film.

The film was shown on the MeTV show Svengoolie on 26 November 2022.

In the 2023 Riverdale episode "Betty & Veronica Double Digest", a 4D screening of the film is held to increase popularity of a financially struggling movie theater.

=== Mystery Science Theater 3000 ===
Under the title The Crawling Eye, the film was featured in the first episode of the TV series Mystery Science Theater 3000 after the series moved from KTMA to The Comedy Channel. The episode aired on November 25, 1989. The Crawling Eye was also briefly mentioned at the end of the season 10 finale (the second series finale) covering Danger: Diabolik. Because the Comedy Channel was not available in the Twin Cities, the cast and writers watched the episode at a bar in Bloomington, Minn., the only town in the area that offered the channel.

As is the case with all the first season MST3K episodes, writer Jim Vorel rated the episode poorly, ranking it four spots from the bottom at #193 in his evaluation of the show's first twelve seasons. "The film itself is nothing too special or memorable," Vorel writes, and not as painful as some others. However, the "uninspired riffing" by Joel and the 'bots bring the episode down, and they contribute "more low-energy or awkward moments" than later in the series.

The episode featuring the film was released on the Mystery Science Theater 3000: Volume XVII DVD collection by Shout! Factory on March 16, 2010. The Crawling Eye disc includes the film's original theatrical trailer. Other episodes in the collection include The Beatniks (episode #101), The Final Sacrifice (episode #910), and The Blood Waters of Dr. Z (episode #1005).
