= To the Devil a Daughter =

1976 supernatural horror film

- Theatrical release poster
- Directed by: Peter Sykes
- Written by: Chris Wicking; John Peacock; Gerald Vaughan-Hughes
- Based on: To the Devil a Daughter by Dennis Wheatley
- Produced by: Roy Skeggs
- Starring: Richard Widmark; Christopher Lee; Nastassja Kinski; Honor Blackman; Denholm Elliott
- Cinematography: David Watkin
- Edited by: John Trumper
- Music by: Paul Glass
- Production companies: Hammer Film Productions; Terra Filmkunst
- Distributed by: EMI Films (United Kingdom); Constantin Film (West Germany); Cine Artists Releasing (United States)
- Release dates: 4 March 1976 (United Kingdom); 10 July 1976 (United States)
- Running time: 92 minutes
- Countries: United Kingdom; West Germany; United States
- Language: English
- Budget: £360,000

To the Devil a Daughter, sometimes stylised as To the Devil... a Daughter, is a 1976 supernatural horror film directed by Peter Sykes and starring Richard Widmark, Christopher Lee, Honor Blackman, Nastassja Kinski, and Denholm Elliott. Loosely based on the 1953 novel of the same name by Dennis Wheatley, it follows an American occult researcher in England who attempts to save a teenage girl preyed upon by a Satanic cult led by a fallen Catholic priest.

An international co-production between the United Kingdom, West Germany, and the United States, the film was produced by Hammer Film Productions and Terra Filmkunst. It was originally devised by Hammer as a television episode in a series based on Wheatley's novels, which never materialized. Wheatley's book was subsequently adapted as a feature film co-written by Christopher Wicking. The film was mostly shot in Bavaria and London in 1975, and features a musical score by the Swiss-American composer Paul Glass.

The film premiered in London in March 1976 and went on to become one of Hammer's most profitable films of the 1970s. Despite this, it has received generally unfavourable reviews, and Wheatley, Widmark, Wicking, and Hammer executive Michael Carreras were unhappy with it. It was Hammer's penultimate film before The Lady Vanishes (1979) ended their run in the 20th century, and their last to feature Lee until The Resident (2011).

== Plot ==
Father Michael Rayner, a Catholic priest, is formally excommunicated from the church for heresy.

Twenty years later, Rayner oversees the Children of the Lord, a mysterious religious order headquartered on a small island in Bavaria. Catherine Beddows, a teenage girl, has been raised in the order at the urging of her late mother, who was a dedicated member. Catherine is formally released from the island convent by Rayner days before her eighteenth birthday.

Meanwhile, John Verney, a famous American writer and occult expert residing in London, is approached at a book release party by Catherine's father, Henry, who asks Verney to pick up Catherine from Heathrow Airport and temporarily entrust her in his care, claiming the Children of the Lord is in fact a Satanic cult from which he wishes his daughter to be saved. While Verney's literary associates find the request strange, Verney agrees.

Upon arriving at the airport, Verney finds Catherine, who is in a habit, and manages to intercept her from a member of the order who is escorting her. Verney brings Catherine back to his home, where he gleans information about her upbringing in the cult.

Henry phones Verney's residence and tells Catherine he will come to get her, only to be interrupted by the member who escorted her; wielding a gun, he attempts to stop Henry before Henry shoots him dead. Meanwhile, at a private residence, Rayner, along with a nurse, oversees the pregnant Margaret, a member of the order who is going into labour. After she gives birth, he has her killed with a morphine injection.

The next morning, Verney is visited by his friends Anna and David, and informs them he believes that the cult intend to use Catherine in a ritual on her birthday the following day, which happens to be Halloween. Verney leaves Catherine in Anna and David's care while he attempts to locate the London headquarters of the Children of the Lord, only to find it has been sold to a Christian organization.

Meanwhile, the cult use black magic in an attempt to draw Catherine to them. She visits St Katharine Docks, where Verney happens upon her, sabotaging the cult's efforts by ripping a sacrilegious Astaroth pendant from her neck. Verney attempts to convince the impervious Catherine that Astaroth is evil, triggering memories of the sex magic rituals the cult subjected her to, during which Rayner impregnated Margaret.

Verney gleans from the bishop who excommunicated Rayner that the cult are aspiring to prepare Catherine to become an avatar of the demon Astaroth, whom Rayner believes to be a route to perfecting human power, and thus the true God. Meanwhile, under Rayner's influence, Catherine murders Anna before wandering the city streets, only to be led directly to the cult, who have welcomed the birth of Margaret's demonic infant child.

Verney and David visit a dishevelled Henry, who directs them to a church to locate the metal "pact" he made with Rayner, which threatens Henry's life. The two men find the ghost of Catherine's mother rising from the church altar where the "pact" pendant is hidden. David bursts into flames and burns to death upon touching the pendant, though Henry is saved.

Verney tracks Rayner to an abandoned mausoleum yard where Rayner has laid Catherine on an altar and encircled it with human blood from another cult devotee, Eveline, who gives her blood, and life, for the purpose. He bludgeons George, who is guarding the area, with a rock and then witnesses Rayner sacrifice the demon child in preparation of baptizing Catherine to become Astaroth's avatar. Verney confronts Rayner, critiquing his beliefs and warning Rayner that he has misinterpreted the grimoire of Astaroth. Rayner asserts his confidence, and offers Catherine, who appears as a nude spirit, to Verney, who refuses the temptation.

Verney uses the rock which is covered with George's blood, as a talisman to defeat the protection of the circle of blood. Then Verney throws the rock at Rayner, vanquishing him; Rayner vanishes into nothingness. Verney manages to save Catherine, carrying her away, as the two flee Rayner's circle of blood. However, Catherine has been partially baptized with several drops of blood, leaving her status in question.

== Cast ==
- Richard Widmark as John Verney
- Christopher Lee as Father Michael Rayner
- Nastassja Kinski as Catherine Beddows
- Honor Blackman as Anna Fountain
- Michael Goodliffe as George De Grass
- Anthony Valentine as David Kennedy
- Denholm Elliott as Henry Beddows
- Eva Maria Meineke as Eveline de Grass
- Derek Francis as The Bishop
- Frances de la Tour as Salvation Army Major
- Constantin de Goguel as Kollde
- Izabella Telezynska as Margaret
- Anna Bentinck as Isabel
- Petra Peters as Sister Helle
- Brian Wilde as Black Room Attendant
- Howard Goorney as Critic

== Thematic inspiration ==
In his book Good Versus Evil in the Films of Christopher Lee (2018), writer Paul Leggett noted that the film's overarching theme is that of the Devil's bargain, comparing elements of it to the bargain with the Devil made in the German legend of Faust. In 2024, Anne Billson of The Guardian cited it as part of "an avalanche of films about devils, witch cults and the imminent birth of the Antichrist" which were unleashed by the success of Rosemary's Baby (1968) and The Exorcist (1973), which she wrote "dovetailed with the predominant 1970s mood of moral uncertainty, exposure of the traditional nuclear family unit as not necessarily benign, and all-round diminished trust in institutions and governments." Writing for the British Film Institute's Screenonline, George Watson regarded the film as having a "striking resemblance" to Aleister Crowley's novel Moonchild, published in 1929. He added that "the delineation between the forces of light and darkness is always clear and lacks the moral ambiguity suggested by a film like Rosemary's Baby. In that sense, more than any other, it feels like a 'classic' Hammer horror film."

== Production ==
=== Development ===
The film was adapted by Christopher Wicking and John Peacock from the 1953 novel of the same name by Dennis Wheatley. It was the second of Wheatley's "black magic" novels to be filmed by Hammer, following The Devil Rides Out (1968). The project had originally been intended to be an episode of a television series based on Wheatley's novels, titled The Devil and all His Works. The television project never materialized, but regular Hammer star Christopher Lee championed the novel, convinced it would make an effective feature film. EMI Films agreed to provide fifty per cent of the budget, after which the West German production company Terra Filmkunst provided the remaining fifty per cent.

Ken Russell and Nicolas Roeg were considered to direct the project, but Australian director Peter Sykes was ultimately hired. When the film went into production in 1975, Sykes derided the notion that it bore any similarity to William Friedkin's The Exorcist (1973).

The screenplay notably deviated from the source novel, which Wheatley disliked, finding the finished film obscene. He told Hammer that they were never to make another film from his novels.

Wicking called the film "an awful mess. There was no real focus to it." He wanted to incorporate DNA as part of the storyline but said EMI refused because they felt this would make it too much like a science fiction film rather than a horror film.

Michael Carreras said the film "simply didn't work ... the people who made it forgot about the ending." He said he asked Nat Cohen of EMI for additional funds to do a new ending – "I had it properly written out and we knew exactly what to do" – but Cohen refused.

=== Casting ===
Lee's casting in the film was announced in March 1975. Terra Filmkunst demanded that a German performer be cast in a leading role, so Sykes cast Nastassja Kinski as Catherine after seeing her performance in Wim Wenders's film Wrong Move (1975). The American film actor Richard Widmark was cast as the occult writer who attempts to save Kinski's character.

This was Michael Goodliffe's last film, made shortly before he killed himself while suffering from depression.

=== Filming ===
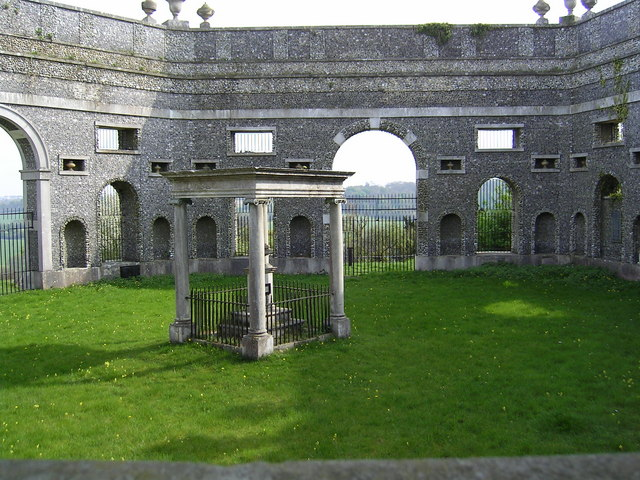
The closing scenes were filmed at the Dashwood Mausoleum in West Wycombe.

Although originally scheduled to begin filming in June 1974, this was postponed until September 1975 due to its financing issues. Unlike most Hammer films, often shot on studio sets, principal photography took place entirely on location, largely in Bavaria and London. Its London locations included Heathrow Airport and St Katharine Docks. The film's climactic sequence was originally intended to be filmed in the crypt of St Martin-in-the-Fields church in Westminster, but instead took place at Dashwood Mausoleum and Hellfire Caves in West Wycombe in Buckinghamshire.

Sykes recalled that Widmark threatened several times to leave and return to the United States due to his displeasure with the production during shooting. He had scuffles with various members of the cast and crew, and called Hammer "Mickey Mouse Productions". Kinski, who was fourteen years old at the time of filming, controversially appeared fully nude onscreen, which she later regretted.

=== Music ===
Swiss-American composer Paul Glass provided the film's score.

== Release ==
To the Devil a Daughter was released in London on March 4, 1976. It screened in the United States later that year, opening in July 1976.

=== Home media ===
Anchor Bay Entertainment released the film on DVD in North America on 8 October 2002. Scream Factory released a Blu-ray edition on 17 December 2019. As of May 2023, the Blu-ray sales had totaled US$144,151. This Blu-ray edition went out of print in 2024.

== Reception ==
=== Box office ===
During its opening week at the Odeon Leicester Square, the film earned £13,375. The film was overall a financial success, and one of Hammer Studios' most profitable releases of the 1970s.

=== Critical response ===
As of January 2025, To the Devil a Daughter holds a 45% approval rating on movie review aggregator website Rotten Tomatoes based on 11 reviews. On Metacritic, the film has a weighted average score of 39 out of 100 based on five critics, indicating "generally unfavourable" reviews.

==== Contemporary ====
Variety called the film a "lacklustre occult melodrama" that "seems padded and tentative, and though horrific in spots the actual shock value is remarkably subdued." Linda Gross of the Los Angeles Times found the story "a confusing vacillation between special effects, hallucinations, psychic trances and ongoing narration," but thought the film was "distinguished by engrossing performances," "superior photography" and "eerie music." Tony Rayns of The Monthly Film Bulletin praised the "expert special effects" and "no-nonsense script," and commented that Lee played his role "with a gusto absent from his performances for many years." Time Out called it "a good deal more interesting than the rest of the possession cycle, but still a disappointment."

Gary Arnold of The Washington Post felt the film was poorly made, writing that it "seems to have been scripted, directed and edited with extreme haste and negligence, as if the filmmakers had to keep one step ahead of process servers or the finance company." Roger Ebert of the Chicago Sun-Times called it "the most over-directed exploitation movie I've seen in a long time – it attempts to squeeze in so many subplots and parallel bits of action that finally we're left scratching our heads and wondering who the characters are [...] The screenplay has so many characters, and they're in so many different places, that the only way to keep them halfway straight is for them to be calling each other all the time. There are even several scenes in which the phone rings and no one's at home. No one of this Earth, anyway."

==== Retrospective ====
In 1995, Leonard Maltin's home video guide gave the film two and half stars, saying it was "well made but lacks punch." In a 2020 review, Paul Farrell of Bloody Disgusting noted that although its screenplay is convoluted, the film "works as a potent dive into the occult. It feels as dangerous as it should, built on performances that resonate and visuals that stick in the mind's eye long after the credits complete their elegy." Filmink called it "a financial and creative disappointment, which killed off Hammer horror... Still, like all Hammer horrors, the movie has its fans and has probably proved lucrative over the long term."

George Watson of the British Film Institute's Screenonline wrote that although it was "released in 1976 to an indifferent response, it was nevertheless an interesting attempt to make a commercially successful film". He suggested that the "gory childbirth scene" foreshadowed the chestburster from Alien (1979), and added that "for the first time here is a Hammer film that feels comfortable with its contemporary setting and more extreme levels of sex and violence." However, he regarded making the entire film on location as having an adverse effect, as "the minutely controlled atmosphere of the earlier films is sacrificed, and the incongruous scenes set in Bavaria suggest that concessions were made in the name of international co-production."

== Legacy ==
Lee's line "It is not heresy ... and I will not recant!" was sampled by heavy metal band White Zombie for the song "Super-Charger Heaven". The film's title was also referenced by White Zombie in the song "Black Sunshine" ("To the devil, a daughter comes ...")

== Sources ==
- Fellner, Chris (2019). The Encyclopedia of Hammer Films. Lanham, Maryland: Rowman & Littlefield. ISBN 978-1-5381-2659-2.
- Hearn, Marcus; Barnes, Alan (2007). The Hammer Story: The Authorised History of Hammer Films. London: Titan. ISBN 978-1-84576-185-1.
- Johnson, Tom; Del Vecchio, Deborah (1996). Hammer Films: An Exhaustive Filmography. Jefferson, North Carolina: McFarland & Company. ISBN 978-0-786-40034-8.
- Johnson, Tom; Miller, Mark A. (2016). The Christopher Lee Filmography: All Theatrical Releases, 1948-2003. Jefferson, North Carolina: McFarland. ISBN 978-1-476-60896-9.
- Leggett, Paul (2018). Good Versus Evil in the Films of Christopher Lee. Jefferson, North Carolina: McFarland. ISBN 978-1-476-66963-2.
- Meikle, Dennis (2009). A History of Horrors: The Rise and Fall of the House of Hammer. Lanham, Maryland: Scarecrow Press. ISBN 978-0-810-86354-5.
- Pohle, Robert W. Jr.; Hart, Douglas C.; Pohle Baldwin, Rita (2017). The Christopher Lee Film Encyclopedia. Lanham, Maryland: Rowman & Littlefield. ISBN 978-0-810-89270-5.
