= The Oblong Box (film) =

1969 British film by Gordon Hessler

- US film poster
- Directed by: Gordon Hessler
- Screenplay by: Lawrence Huntington; Additional Dialogue: Christopher Wicking
- Based on: "The Oblong Box" by Edgar Allan Poe
- Produced by: Gordon Hessler
- Starring: Vincent Price; Christopher Lee
- Cinematography: John Coquillon
- Edited by: Max Benedick
- Music by: Harry Robinson
- Production company: American International Pictures
- Distributed by: Anglo-EMI Film Distributors; Warner-Pathé
- Release date: 11 June 1969
- Running time: 91 minutes
- Country: United Kingdom
- Language: English
- Budget: £70,000 or $175,000
- Box office: $1.02 million (US/ Canada rentals)

The Oblong Box is a 1969 British gothic horror film directed by Gordon Hessler, starring Vincent Price, Christopher Lee and Alister Williamson. This was the first film to star both Price and Lee.

Taking its title from the 1844 short story "The Oblong Box", it explores and combines several themes typical to the work of Edgar Allan Poe, such as premature burial and masked figures, with the non-Poe theme of voodoo ritual killings.

== Plot ==
In 1865 England, having been disfigured in an African voodoo ceremony for a transgression against the native populace, Sir Edward Markham is kept locked in his room by his guilt-ridden brother, Julian. Tiring of his captivity, Sir Edward plots to escape by faking his death. Aided by family lawyer Trench, he hires witchdoctor N'Galo to concoct a drug to put Sir Edward into a deathlike trance. Before Trench has time to act, Julian finds his "dead" brother and puts him in a coffin. Embarrassed by his brother's appearance, Julian asks Trench to find a proxy body for Sir Edward's lying in state. Trench and N'Galo murder landlord Tom Hacket and offer his corpse to Julian. After the wake, Trench and his young companion Norton, dispose of Hacket's body in a nearby river, while Julian has Sir Edward buried. Now free of his brother, Julian marries his young fiancée, Elizabeth.

Instead of being dug up by his associates, Edward is exhumed by graverobbers and delivered to Dr. Neuhartt. Neuhartt opens the coffin and is confronted by the resurrected Sir Edward. With his first-hand knowledge of Neuhartt's illegal activities, Sir Edward blackmails the doctor into sheltering him. Suspecting his associates betrayed him, Sir Edward conceals his face behind a crimson hood and, searching for the witchdoctor, embarks on a vengeful killing spree.

Norton is first on Sir Edward's list and has his throat slit when he fails to reveal the witchdoctor's whereabouts. In between killings, Sir Edward romances Neuhartt's maid Sally. After learning about their affair, Neuhartt discharges Sally, who goes to work for Julian. While searching for Trench, he is sidetracked by a couple of drunks who drag him into a nearby tavern. There, he ends up with prostitute Heidi, who tries to steal his money. However, Sir Edward kills her. The police get involved, and the hunt is on for a killer in a crimson hood.

Meanwhile, Julian becomes suspicious about the body that Trench supplied to him, after his friend Kemp finds it washed up on a riverbank. Julian confronts Trench, who reveals the truth about Sir Edward's "death". Trench is later dispatched by Sir Edward, but not before he tells him the whereabouts of N'Galo. Hoping he will cure him of his disfigurement, Sir Edward asks N'Galo for his help. Sir Edward then learns the truth about his time in Africa: in a case of mistaken identity he was punished for Julian's crime of killing a child. N'Galo fails to cure Sir Edward, and they fight; N'Galo stabs Sir Edward in the chest and Sir Edward retaliates by throwing hot liquid in his face. Sir Edward then returns to Neuhartt's home, where Neuhartt tends to his wound. Mistrusting Neuhartt's medical treatment, Sir Edward slits his throat and sets off to confront his brother.

At the Markham ancestral home, Julian learns the whereabouts of his brother from Sally and leaves for Dr. Neuhartt's home, only to find him near death. Meanwhile, Sir Edward arrives home to find Sally, who is repulsed by her former lover's killing. Sir Edward drags her out onto the grounds of the house, pleading for her love. Julian arrives and gives chase with a double-barrelled shotgun. Out in the woods, Sally snatches Sir Edward's hood from him and his deformed face is revealed. She screams. Julian catches up and Sir Edward confronts him about his crime. As Sir Edward lurches forward, Julian shoots him with both barrels. Julian leans over the dying Sir Edward, who bites him on the hand.

Once again in his coffin, Sir Edward is resurrected by a vengeful N'Galo, but this time he is six feet under with no hope of escape. At the Markham mansion, Elizabeth finds Julian in Edward's old room. When she asks what he is doing in there, he says that it is his room, and turns to reveal that his face is becoming disfigured – Edward's bite passed on the disease to Julian. Elizabeth is flushed with fear.

== Cast ==
- Vincent Price as Sir Julian Markham
- Christopher Lee as Doctor Neuhartt
- Rupert Davies as Julien Kemp
- Uta Levka as Heidi
- Sally Geeson as Sally Baxter
- Alister Williamson as Sir Edward Markham
- Peter Arne as Samuel Trench
- Hilary Dwyer as Elizabeth
- Maxwell Shaw as Hackett
- Carl Rigg as Mark Norton
- Harry Baird as N'Galo
- Godfrey James as Weller
- John Barrie as Franklin
- Ivor Dean as Hawthorne
- Danny Daniels as Witchdoctor
- Michael Balfour as Ruddock
- Hira Talfrey as Martha
- John Wentworth as Parson
- Colin Jeavons as Doctor
- Martin Wyldeck as Constable
- Zeph Gladstone as Trench's Girl
- Nick Tate as Young Man in Tavern
- The Oh! Ogunde Dancers as Voodoo Celebrants

== Production ==
The film was produced by the British subsidiary of American International Pictures. Price, Davies and Dwyer had recently appeared in Witchfinder General, under the direction of Michael Reeves, and on 18 November 1968, the four also began work on the Oblong Box. The original script had the Markham brothers as twins, both played by Vincent Price.

Christopher Wicking was bought in to do some additional dialogue. He says AIP were keen to put the film into production to take advantage of Witchfinders success and that they had also promised him When the Sleeper Wakes and a film about Christ coming to the modern day. Wicking says Oblong Box "was the carrot".

However, Reeves fell ill during pre-production, so Hessler stepped in and made a number of substantial changes. With the help of Christopher Wicking, he reworked the screenplay to incorporate the theme of imperial exploitation of native peoples in Africa. This theme gave the film a "pro-black" appearance that would later cause it to be banned in Texas.

The leading role of Sir Edward was given to character actor Alister Williamson. Although he has the largest amount of screen time, more than either Price or Lee, his real voice is never heard (it was redubbed by another actor) and his face is covered for the majority of the film. His makeup was done by Jimmy Evans, whose other credits include Captain Kronos – Vampire Hunter (1972) and Hessler's Scream and Scream Again (1970).

Hessler says AIP insisted he use Hilary Dwyer.:

I don't know what the situation was, but they liked her and they kept pushing you to use certain actors. I guess the management must have thought she was star material or something like that.

Shooting took place at Shepperton Studios, with sets were designed by the art director George Provis. The score was composed by Harry Robertson, who later worked on several Hammer Horrors.

== Reception ==
=== Box office ===
According to Hessler, the film was very successful and ushered in a series of follow up horror movies for AIP including Scream and Scream Again and Cry of the Banshee.

=== Critical ===
Rotten Tomatoes, a review aggregator, reports that 57% of seven surveyed critics gave the film a positive review; the average rating was 4.6/10.

A. H. Weiler of The New York Times wrote, "The British and American producers, who have been mining Edgar Allan Poe's seemingly inexhaustible literary lode like mad, now have unearthed The Oblong Box to illustrate once again that horror can be made to be quaint, laughable and unconvincing at modest prices."

Variety wrote, "Price as usual overacts, but it is an art here to fit the mood and piece and as usual Price is good in his part."
