= Theodore Wilhelm =

German actor (1909–1971)

Theodore Wilhelm (1909–1971) was a German actor.

== Filmography ==
Year	Title	Role	Notes
1955	Little Red Monkey	Secretary of the International Social Club	
1955	Scotland Yard, The Stateless Man	Slavik, a wrongly accused man	
1956	Assignment Redhead	German Thug	
1958	Blood of the Vampire	Emaciated Prisoner	
1958	The Trollenberg Terror	Fritz	
1959	Murder at Site 3		Uncredited
1960	A Circle of Deception		Uncredited
1960	Shoot to Kill	Nikolai	
1961	The Pursuers	Parris	
1967	The Dirty Dozen	German Officer	Uncredited
