= What's Good for the Goose =

1969 British film by Menahem Golan

- Theatrical release poster
- Directed by: Menahem Golan
- Written by: Norman Wisdom; Menahem Golan
- Produced by: Tony Tenser
- Starring: Norman Wisdom; Sally Geeson; Terence Alexander; David Lodge
- Cinematography: William Brayne
- Edited by: Dennis Lanning
- Music by: Ken Howard
- Distributed by: Tigon British Film Productions
- Release date: March 1969 (UK)
- Running time: 105 minutes (UK); 98 minutes (edited)
- Country: United Kingdom
- Language: English

What's Good For The Goose (also known as Girl Trouble and What's Good for the Gander), is a 1969 British comedy film directed by Menahem Golan and starring Norman Wisdom and Sally Geeson. It was written by Wisdom and Golan and produced by Tony Tenser.

The film features pop music by Electric Banana, otherwise known as The Pretty Things.

It was Norman Wisdom's first British film made outside the Rank Organisation and his last lead in a British film.

== Plot ==
Timothy Bartlett is a fifty-something assistant bank manager whose working life and marriage in London have become lacklustre. When his superior is taken ill, he tells Bartlett to take his place at a bankers' conference in Southport. On his way, two young, fun-loving female students, Meg and Nikki, invite themselves for a lift in his car and he grudgingly agrees. Initially annoyed by them, he ends up becoming interested in Nikki. Wandering around to find something to do at night, he ends up meeting her at a club where the Pretty Things are playing. They spend the night together at his hotel.

The following day, during the conference, he can only think of her. He abandons his work responsibilities to have a perfect day with her, taking in the seaside amusements and recapturing his youthful energy. He tells her he has fallen in love with her and rents a "love nest" for them. Her friend tries to warn him not to get too serious, as Nikki doesn't want a relationship. He comes back to their love nest, only to find hippies are hanging out there having sex, and have vandalised the place. When he goes to the bedroom, he finds Nikki in bed with a man of her own age. Meg tells him he was just a two-day novelty for Nikki, and she has already moved on to someone else, and that's the nature of the free love scene.

Inspired by the time he has spent in Southport, he invites his wife to join him there. She doesn't recognise him when he meets her at the airport, as he is now wearing counterculture scene clothing. He takes her to buy "young" clothes, and goes off with her to the places Nikki and he had visited. They replicate the perfect day he had with Nikki, though his wife doesn't enjoy everything as much as Nikki did. He finds he can have almost as much enjoyment with his wife, and ultimately, the couple embrace dressing "young" and doing cool "now" things.

== Cast ==
- Norman Wisdom as Timothy Bartlett
- Sally Geeson as Nikki
- Sarah Atkinson as Meg
- Sally Bazely as Margaret Bartlett
- Stuart Nichol as bank manager
- Derek Francis as Harrington
- Terence Alexander as Frisby
- Paul Whitsun-Jones as Clark
- David Lodge as porter
- Karl Lanchbury as Pete
- Hilary Pritchard as cashier in discotheque

== Production ==
There was also a German dubbed version of the film titled Öfter mal was Junges!! This is 27 minutes shorter than the UK version running to 75 minutes instead of 102 minutes. It contains alternative longer versions of the hotel bedroom scenes in which Sally Geeson is topless rather than remaining in her bra as she does in the UK print (which is the generally available version). The text in the opening credits is completely redone in German over the same unfettered film sequence as in the UK version meaning it must have been prepared concurrently.

The film uses locations around the Southport area, including the Birkdale Palace Hotel.

== Reception ==
The Monthly Film Bulletin wrote: "Norman Wisdom joins the flower people in what must be a strong candidate for the worst British comedy for some considerable time. Wisdom's brand of little man pathos – in his previous films merely embarrassing – is here grotesque beyond belief, whether he is narcissistically flexing his sagging muscles before leaping into bed with a giggling teenage dolly, prancing insanely over sand dunes in breathless celebration of his rejuvenation, or cavorting round a hideous discotheque in a painfully unfunny attempt to persuade the inmates that he's still young at heart. The rest is a catalogue of disaster: dialogue of indescribable inanity, appallingly crude performances from most of the supporting players, and colour which looks as though it has been processed in a mud bath. And the Israeli director (previously responsible for such horrors as Seduced in Sodom) adds insult to injury by periodically inserting bits of pointless speeded-up motion. Ugh."

The Radio Times Guide to Films gave the film 1/5 stars, writing: "With a contrived title and a simply appalling script (co-written by Norman Wisdom himself), this is one of the biggest blots on the British movie copybook. Directed with no feel for Wisdom's unique brand of comedy, it is jam-packed with cringeworthy moments."

Leslie Halliwell wrote: "Embarrassing attempt to build a sexy vehicle for a star whose sentimental mugging always appealed mainly to children."

In Sixties British Cinema Robert Murphy wrote: "Its setting among the dregs of the Swinging Sixties – Wisdom is a timid bank clerk who falls for a promiscuous young swinger (Sally Geeson) – gives it a gruesome sort of appeal, but it did his career little good and turned out to be his last feature film."

David McGillivray called it a "low-grade exploitation film" that "finished Norman Wisdom's film career."
