= Murder at Site 3 =

1958 British film by Francis Searle

- Opening titles
- Directed by: Francis Searle
- Written by: Paddy Manning O'Brine
- Based on: Crime Is My Business by W Howard Baker (as Peter Saxon)
- Produced by: Charles Leeds, Francis Searle
- Starring: Geoffrey Toone, Barbara Shelley
- Cinematography: Bert Mason
- Music by: Don Banks
- Production company: Francis Searle Productions
- Release date: 1958
- Running time: 67 minutes
- Country: United Kingdom
- Language: English

Murder at Site 3 (also known as Murder at Site Three) is a 1958 British film directed by Francis Searle and starring Barbara Shelley, Geoffrey Toone and John Warwick. It was written by Paddy Manning O'Brine based on the 1958 novel Crime is My Business by W Howard Baker (as Peter Saxon), and produced at Bray Studios by Francis Searle Productions. It was distributed by Exclusive, a division of Hammer Films.

== Preservation status ==
The British Film Institute National Archive holds a collection of stills but no film or video materials.

== Plot ==
Sexton Blake tracks down an espionage gang who have stolen secrets from a rocket site. After an Air Force security officer is murdered, Blake discovers that the spies are co-workers of the dead man."

== Cast ==
- Geoffrey Toone as Sexton Blake
- Barbara Shelley as Susan
- John Warwick as Commander Chambers
- Richard Burrell as Tinker
- Jill Melford as Paula Dane
- Reed De Rouen as McGill
- Harry Towb as Kenney
- Theodore Wilhelm as Laperine
- Gordon Sterne as Hennessey

== Critical reception ==
The Monthly Film Bulletin wrote: "Blake, his secretary and his assistant Tinker are attractively characterised in a modest thriller suffering less from its many improbabilities than a meandering, over-deliberate and for the most part tedious narrative."

Kine Weekly wrote: "Tin-pot 'who-dunit,' unfolded somewhere in England. ... The players work hard, but loose direction and an untidy script prevent their labours from being adequately rewarded. It never convinces and seldom thrills. ... The picture flits from one country hostelry to another, but nothing particularly exciting emerges from the interminable pub crawl. By the time it ends, the red herrings are over pickled! ... the film's a damp squib."

Picturegoer wrote: "Good, brisk fun in the schoolboy tradition, the film gets a reliable-looking Blake in Geoffrey Toone and a prettily menaced heroine in Barbara Shelley."

Paul Mavis wrote in The Espionage Filmography: "This plays more like an hour long television show than a feature release. It does have the delightful Barbara Shelley, however."
