= Hitchhike! =

- Genre: Thriller
- Story by: Jay Benson; M.K. Landstein; Yale Udoff
- Directed by: Gordon Hessler
- Music by: Gil Mellé
- Country of origin: United States
- Original language: English

Production
- Producer: Jay Benson
- Cinematography: Leonard J. South
- Editor: John F. Schreyer
- Running time: 90 min.
- Production company: Universal Television

Original release
- Network: ABC
- Release: February 23, 1974

Hitchhike! is a 1974 American TV film directed by Gordon Hessler.

== Plot ==
A Los Angeles woman, traveling to San Francisco to visit her sister, picks up a hitchhiker who turns out to be a psychotic killer.

== Cast ==
- Cloris Leachman
- Michael Brandon
- Henry Darrow
- Cameron Mitchell
- Sherry Jackson
- Linden Chiles
- Les Lannom
- Elizabeth Kerr
- Eddie Quillan
- Terry Wilson

== Production ==
Leachman said she did it because it was work, "I like a change of pace" and "there are so many things you can do if the character is right."

== Reception ==
The Los Angeles Times called it "a trite suspenser given dimension by Cloris Leachman."
