= Peter Saxon =

Nom de plume

Peter Saxon is a pen name used by various thriller authors from the 1950s to the 1970s.

== History ==
The pseudonym "Peter Saxon" was originally used by Irish pulp fiction writer and journalist W. Howard Baker at Amalgamated Press, mostly for novels in the Sexton Blake series. One of these Sexton Blake novels, Crime Is My Business, was made into the 1958 film, Murder at Site 3, by Hammer Film Productions. In 1965, Baker moved to a different publisher, Mayflower Books, and continued writing Sexton Blake novels as "Peter Saxon", but Mayflower also began to use this pen-name as a house pseudonym for works by other authors. The Disorientated Man was a Peter Saxon conspiracy thriller mainly written by Stephen Frances and edited by Baker; it was adapted as the 1970 film, Scream and Scream Again, starring Vincent Price, Christopher Lee, Alfred Marks, Michael Gothard, and Peter Cushing. The occult detective fiction series The Guardians was another Peter Saxon title, with writers including Baker, Rex Dolphin, Wilfred McNeilly, and Thomas Martin.
