= Sally Geeson =

English actress (born 1950)

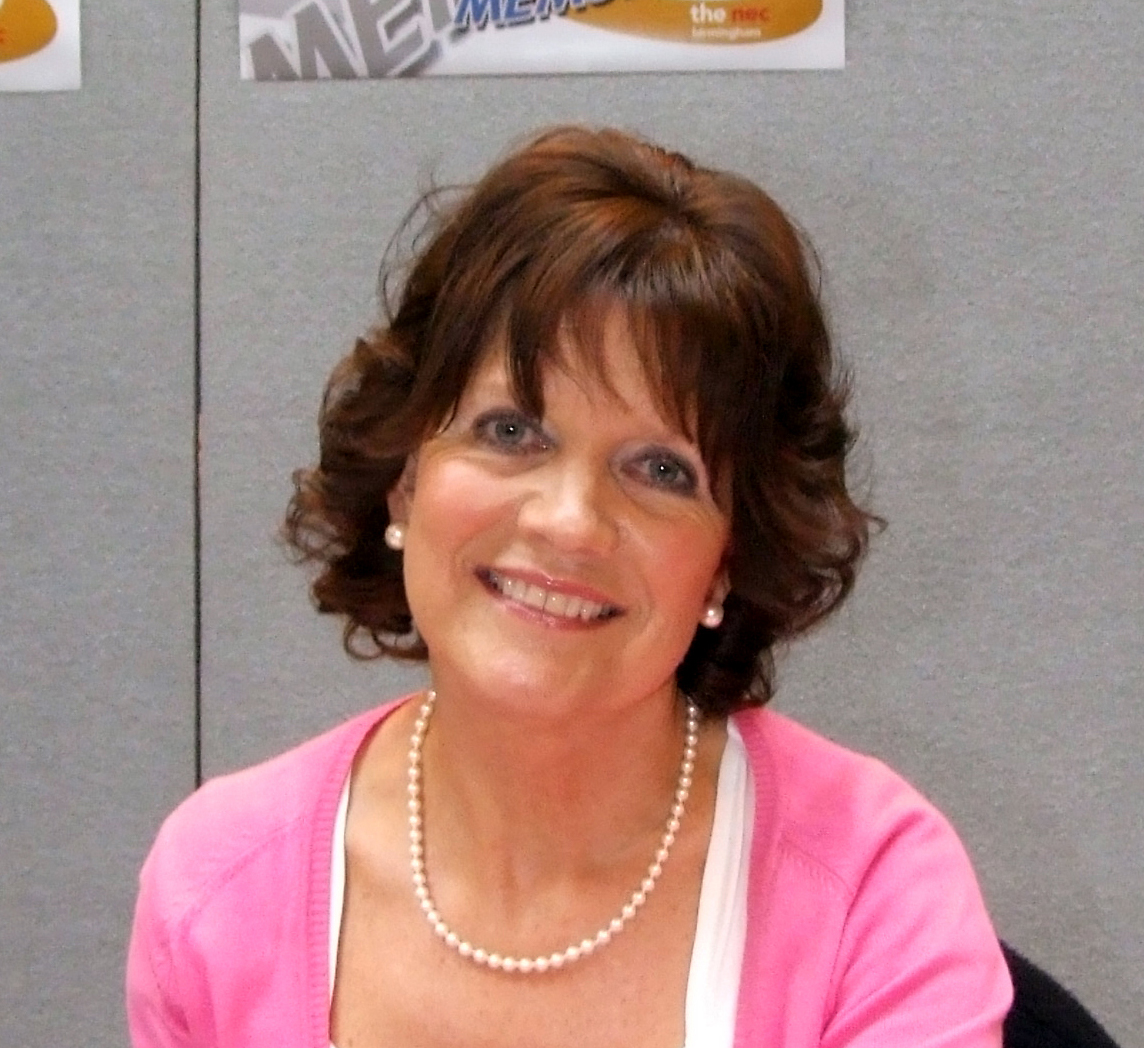
- Geeson in 2009
- Born: Sarah Louise Clouston Geeson; 23 June 1950 (age 76); Cuckfield, West Sussex, England
- Occupation: Actress
- Years active: 1959–present
- Spouses: William G. Stewart (m. 1976; div. 1986): Richard Lewis
- Children: 3
- Relatives: Judy Geeson (sister)

Sarah Louise Clouston Geeson (born 23 June 1950), known professionally as Sally Geeson, is an English actress with a career mostly on television in the 1970s. She is best known for playing Sid James's daughter, Sally, in Bless This House and for her roles in Carry On Abroad (1972) and Carry On Girls (1973). She also starred alongside Norman Wisdom in the film What's Good for the Goose (1969), and appeared with Vincent Price in two horror films, The Oblong Box (1969) and Cry of the Banshee (1970).

== Early life ==
Geeson's father was an editor for the National Coal Board magazine while her mother worked in the box office at the London Coliseum cinema.

== Career ==
Geeson studied at Corona Stage Academy from 1957 to 1966, during which time she played small non-speaking roles in several movies, including Expresso Bongo (1959), The Millionairess (1960), Spare the Rod (1961), The Young Ones and Carry On Regardless (1961). She played a schoolgirl in The Great St Trinian's Train Robbery (1966), and appeared as a girl guide in Don't Raise the Bridge, Lower the River (1968). She starred alongside Norman Wisdom in the comedy film What's Good for the Goose (1969) and Vincent Price in the horror films The Oblong Box (1969) and Cry of the Banshee (1970).

In 1971, Geeson appeared in Mr. Forbush and the Penguins before starring as Sally in Bless This House, appearing in all 65 episodes until the show's end in 1976 as well as starring in a film spin-off of the same name in 1972. She also appeared in two further Carry On films: Carry On Abroad (1972) and Carry On Girls (1973).

In August 2013 Geeson featured in a TV commercial for Anglian Windows. In December 2014 until January 2015, Geeson played the Good Fairy at Theatre Royal Windsor in their panto Beauty And The Beast.

== Personal life ==
Geeson married television personality William G. Stewart in 1976 and the pair had two children together. The couple divorced ten years later. She later took up a career in teaching and married Richard Lewis, an estate agent and had a further child. Her sister is the actress Judy Geeson.

== Filmography ==
- Expresso Bongo (1959) — Extra (uncredited)
- The Millionairess (1960) — Extra (uncredited)
- Carry On Regardless (1961) – Girl at Toy Exhibition (uncredited)
- Spare the Rod (1961) — Extra (uncredited)
- The Young Ones — Extra (uncredited)
- Go to Blazes - Girl playing on fire engine (uncredited}
- The Great St Trinian's Train Robbery (1966) – Schoolgirl (uncredited)
- Mrs. Brown, You've Got a Lovely Daughter (1968) — Extra (uncredited)
- Don't Raise the Bridge, Lower the River (1968) – Girl Guide (uncredited)
- What's Good for the Goose (1969) – Nikki
- The Oblong Box (1969) – Sally
- Cry of the Banshee (1970) – Sarah
- Mr. Forbush and the Penguins (1971) – Jackie
- Bless This House (1972) – Sally Abbott
- Carry On Abroad (1972) – Lily
- Carry On Girls (1973) – Debra

== Television ==
- Katy (1962) – Muriel
- Armchair Mystery Theatre (1964) – Jill
- Boy Meets Girl (1967) – Debutante
- Man in a Suitcase – Day of Execution (1967) – Girl at Cleaners
- Sanctuary – The Girl with the Blue Guitar (1968) – Tina
- You and the World (1968) – Eileen
- ITV Playhouse – Camille (1968) – Kim
- Galton and Simpson Comedy (1969)
- Detective – Hunt the Peacock (1969) – Patsy
- Strange Report – Whose Pretty Girl Are You (1969) – Jennifer Dean
- Softly, Softly: Task Force (1970) – Sue
- Z-Cars – A Day Like Every Day (1970) – Sharon Young
- Wicked Women – Florence Maybrick (1970) – Alice Yapp
- Misleading Cases – The Sitting Bird (1971) – Felicity Haddock
- Bless This House (1971–1976) – Sally Abbott (Last appearances)
- The Fenn Street Gang – Smart Lad Wanted (1972) – Melanie
- My Name Is Harry Worth – The Family Reunion (1974) – Sandra
- Skiboy – Death Mountain (1974) – Francoise

== Selected theatre work ==
- Goodnight Mrs Puffin
- The Day After The Fair
- You Should Have Been Here Yesterday (1970)
- Butterflies Are Free (Bill Kenwright Productions) (1973) - Jill Tanner
- Blood And Roses (Bill Kenwright Productions) (1975) - Grace
