= Scream and Scream Again =

1970 British film by Gordon Hessler

- Theatrical release poster
- Directed by: Gordon Hessler
- Screenplay by: Christopher Wicking
- Based on: The Disorientated Man by Peter Saxon
- Produced by: Max Rosenberg; Milton Subotsky
- Starring: Vincent Price; Christopher Lee; Peter Cushing; Judy Huxtable; Alfred Marks; Michael Gothard
- Cinematography: John Coquillon
- Edited by: Peter Elliott
- Music by: David Whitaker
- Production company: Amicus Productions
- Distributed by: Anglo-Amalgamated; Warner-Pathé (UK); American International Pictures (US)
- Release date: January 1970 (UK)
- Running time: 95 minutes
- Country: United Kingdom
- Language: English
- Budget: $350,000
- Box office: $1,217,000 (US/ Canada rentals)

Scream and Scream Again is a 1970 British science-fiction horror film directed by Gordon Hessler for Amicus Productions, and starring Vincent Price, Christopher Lee, Alfred Marks, Michael Gothard, and Peter Cushing. The screenplay was by Christopher Wicking, based on the 1967 novel The Disorientated Man, attributed to "Peter Saxon", a house pseudonym used by various authors in the 1960s and 1970s.

The film marks the second teaming, after The Oblong Box (1969), of actors Price and Lee with director Hessler. Price and Lee only share a brief scene in the film's climax. Cushing, in his brief scene, shares no screen time with either Price or Lee.

Overlooked during its initial release, the film has since become a minor cult classic, with the Overlook Film Guide acknowledging it as "one of the best science-fiction films made in Britain."

== Plot ==
The movie's structure is fragmented, as it alternates between three plot threads.

A man jogging through urban London grabs his heart and collapses. He wakes up in a hospital bed. The nurse tending him gives him water and leaves. He pulls down the bed covers to discover that his lower right leg has been amputated. He screams. Later scenes repeat the same action as his other limbs are amputated.

Elsewhere, intelligence operative Konratz returns to his home country, an unidentified Eastern European totalitarian state. After being debriefed by Captain Schweitz, Konratz steps around the table and places a hand on Schweitz's shoulder, paralysing and then killing him. Konratz is later reprimanded by his superior Major Benedek for his torturing an escapee, Erika. Konratz kills Major Benedek in the same way.

In London, Metropolitan Police Detective Superintendent Bellaver investigates the rape and murder of a young woman, Eileen Stevens. Bellaver goes with young forensic pathologist Dr. David Sorel to the clinic of her employer Dr. Browning but he provides no useful information. A young woman, Sylvia, is picked up at the Busted Pot Disco by the sinister Keith. She is killed by Keith and her body is later found drained of blood.

The two young women have apparently been raped and murdered by the same individual. Bellaver sends out several young policewomen to try to entrap the killer. WPC Helen Bradford, wearing a wire and electronic tracer, goes to the same club where she lets herself get picked up and driven away by Keith. The police follow and arrive just after Keith has attacked her and appears to be drinking blood from her wrist. With apparent superhuman strength, Keith fights off the arresting police and drives off. A long chase ensues by car and on foot through suburban London, during which Keith tears off his hand whilst handcuffed to the bumper of a police car in an attempt to escape. The pursuit ends at an estate where Keith throws himself into a vat of acid in an outbuilding. The building turns out to belong to Dr. Browning, who explains that he uses the acid to destroy possible pathogens in his biological experiments. Bellaver is ordered to stop his investigations but Sorel decides to continue on his own. Accompanied by WPC Bradford, he goes to Browning's laboratory. Bradford and their car disappear. Bradford wakes up restrained in the same hospital bed with the same nurse attending her as the dismembered jogger.

The narrative strands begin to come together when a senior UK Government officer, Fremont, meets Konratz at London's Trafalgar Square, and agrees to turn over all the evidence in exchange for a captured pilot. Soon after, Konratz goes to police headquarters to remove all the evidence, and kills Bellaver.

Back at the laboratory, Sorel discovers Browning is about to dismember Bradford, as part of a plot to replace humans with composite beings. As they struggle, Browning reveals himself to be one of the composite superhumans. Konratz appears and is angry that Browning's actions have interfered with his part of the plot. When Browning expresses misgivings, he and Konratz struggle, allowing the others to escape. Konratz is pushed into a vat of acid in the laboratory room. As Sorel and Bradford get outside, Fremont appears and tells them to wait for him. He goes back in and, in talking with Browning, reveals himself as a composite. He then subdues Browning and pushes him into the acid. Fremont leaves with Sorel and WPC Bradford. When Sorel asks if it is all over, Fremont tells him it is only just beginning.

== Cast ==
- Vincent Price as Dr. Browning
- Christopher Lee as Fremont
- Peter Cushing as Benedek
- Alfred Marks as Detective Superintendent Bellaver
- Christopher Matthews as Dr. David Sorel
- Judy Huxtable as Sylvia
- Michael Gothard as Keith
- Anthony Newlands as Ludwig
- Kenneth Benda as Professor Kingsmill
- Marshall Jones as Konratz
- Uta Levka as Nurse Jane
- Yutte Stensgaard as Erika
- Judi Bloom as WPC Helen Bradford
- Peter Sallis as Schweitz
- Clifford Earl as Detective Sergeant Jimmy Joyce
- Nigel Lambert as Ken Sparten
- Amen Corner as themselves
- Gertan Klauber as Border Guard (uncredited)

== Production ==
The movie is based on Peter Saxon's science fiction novel, The Disorientated Man, which is very similar to Dr. Mabuse script written by Laszlo Fodor in 1966. For the most part, the movie follows the novel quite closely. In the novel, the antagonists turned out to be aliens. According to an interview with Christopher Lee, the characters were going to be revealed as aliens in the movie's climax, but all connections to that fact were cut out of the movie before it was released, leaving the enigmatic villains' backgrounds unexplained. The edits also cut scenes of actors Julian Holloway and David Lodge as police detectives, though they are still listed in the credits.

Rights to the novel were bought by Milton Subotsky of Amicus Productions, who got financing from Louis Heyward, head of European operations for AIP. There was a script by Subotsky, but it was regarded as unplayable. Gordon Hessler says he got Chris Wicking to rewrite it:

That was really a pulp book, a throwaway book that you read on a train. There was nothing in it, just empty pieces of action. But it was Chris who gave it a whole new level by using it as a political process of what might happen in the future. That is what made the picture, he's the one that came up with all those ideas, yet he still managed to keep the nuances of the sort of pulp fiction novel.

This marked the first time that horror-movie icons Peter Cushing, Vincent Price and Christopher Lee appeared in the same feature film, but they do not share screen space; Cushing appears with neither Lee nor Price; appearing in only a cameo. Lee and Price share a brief scene toward the film's climax.

The film was made in the span of a month, starting 5 May 1969 at Shepperton, with location work done at Trafalgar Square and Chertsey, Surrey.

The eponymous theme song was by Amen Corner, who appeared and sang it in the film. This was one of their last appearances before Andy Fairweather Low departed for a solo career after a brief career with the band, Fair Weather.

== A Dr. Mabuse Movie ==
As the movie was released as an official Dr. Mabuse movie in Germany ("Die Lebenden Leichen des Dr. Mabuse" [The living corpses of Dr. Mabuse]), the case was examined by numerous film historians over the years since the release of the movie.

In KRIMI!#2: THE MANY DEATHS OF DR. MABUSE (2026) the connections between the authors of the book "The Disorientated Man" and one of the main writers for Dr. Mabuse Bryan Edgar Wallace were revealed by film historian Boris Brosowski as was the script for a propsed entry in the CCC-Dr. Mabuse series called "Das Horrorkabinett des Dr. Mabuse" (The Horrorcabinet of Dr. Mabuse), written by Laszlo Fodor for CCC in 1966. The script is very similar to the book and the movie. The article in KRIMI!#2 also traced numerous plotlines in Scream and Scream Again to unpublished Dr. Mabuse material by the original author Norbert Jacques and the creator of the movie character of Dr. Mabuse Fritz Lang. Lang officially approved Scream and Scream again.

== Reception ==
Reviews from critics were mixed. On Rotten Tomatoes, the film has an approval rating of 65% based on 17 reviews, with an average rating of 5.60 out of 10.

The Monthly Film Bulletin wrote: "A plot has been crudely put together with the incongruously clearcut and matter-of-fact tone of a crime thriller ... and the three personalities slotted in at the appropriate places. To justify two of the stars, the theme of vampirism slides, ominously and unnecessarily, in and out of the film, and the creation of a whole race of man-made monsters is now accomplished by a more advanced science than Dr. Frankenstein's ... Vincent Price, hypersensitive recluse and dabbler in the occult, is the menacingly affable director of the clinic where events, and the new supermen, all begin. Not surprisingly, the triumvirate have little room to manoeuvre inside the tight fit of their functional clichés: Peter Cushing has the least opportunity (little more than a bit part), while Christopher Lee disappears into a greying nonentity of a civil servant, failing to emerge even with the final revelation of masked depravity. Vincent Price inimitably delivers the most banal dialogue with a disconcerting relish, though the giveaway decadence of Dr. Browning's living quarters, keyed to a pretty shade of pastel pink, would have provoked a creeping horror in Roderick Usher."

Howard Thompson of The New York Times wrote that the film "tools along intriguingly for a while with some genuine possibilities before taking a nosedive", when it "ends up in still another mad scientist's lair".

Variety wrote that the script "has almost as many holes as the assorted victims of the action. However, such criticism is completely irrelevant to the film's gripping momentum of horror."

Roger Ebert of the Chicago Sun-Times gave the film two stars out of four, calling it "ridiculous", yet "impossible to dislike because they ask only that you share their sense of the absurd. The fascinating thing about this one is that it makes absolutely no sense at all until maybe the last 10 minutes. None."

Gene Siskel of the Chicago Tribune gave the film one star, calling it "a violent and sick film ... that begs to be included in our annual worst twenty list."

Kevin Thomas of the Los Angeles Times called the film "a superb piece of contemporary horror, a science fiction tale possessed of a credibility more terrifying than any of the Gothic witchery of Rosemary's Baby ... It's one of those movies where you have no idea what's going on until the end, but once there, there's no letdown."
