= Peter Sykes (director) =

Australian film director (1939–2006)

Peter Sykes (June 17, 1939 – March 1, 2006) was an Australian television and film director who worked primarily in the United Kingdom. According to FilmInk, "auteurist critics always seem to pass him by."

== Career ==
Sykes was born in Melbourne and worked as a dancer, then as an assistant director on documentaries and children's shows on Australian television. He moved to London in 1963.

Sykes wrote to a fellow Australian, Donald Levy, admiring a documentary Levy had made called Time In. Sykes worked for Levy as an assistant on the film Herostratus. Sykes did an 18-month training cadetship with the BBC then made the documentary Walkabout to Cornwall (1966).

Sykes was commissioned to make a series of films for the British Pavilion exhibit at Expo 67 in Montreal. The series was called Britain Around the World. It led to him meeting Peter Brook who invited Sykes to produce Tell Me Lies (1968).

=== Features ===
Max Steuer admired Walkabout to Cornwall and he invited Sykes to direct The Committee. According to Sight and Sound the film "had a fairly successful if controversial art house career" and while being "top heavy with rather pretentious theatrical dialogue... contained good sequences and was put together with some flair." Kenneth Tynan called it "admirable".

On the strength of this, Sykes was asked to direct some episodes of The Avengers. Sykes recalled they told him, "Look, we've seen this film. We don't understand it, but it looks fantastic, the atmosphere is amazing. Would you come and direct The Avengers? He says "It was a passport for me to do something completely different."

One of his Avengers episodes, "Noon Doomsday", was much praised. Sykes was set to direct a war film, The Rules of War, but that fell through and instead he directed Venom which he called "a romantic fantasy with horror overtones".

=== Hammer ===
Sykes was hired by Hammer to direct Blood Will Have Blood, which became Demons of the Mind (1972). He also directed two comedies for EMI, The House in Nightmare Park with Frankie Howerd, and Steptoe and Son Ride Again (both 1973).

Sykes returned to television for Orson Welles Great Mysteries. He wrote Beware the Darkness.

Sykes directed the last of the Hammer horror films until 2008, To the Devil a Daughter (1976).

=== Later career ===
Sykes went to France in 1977 to direct the series Magicians of the Future. He was meant to return to Australia to direct Eddie and the Breakthrough (also known as Eddie and the Lucky Peanut) but the film was never made. He went to Israel to direct Jesus.

Sykes went to Greece to make The Search for Alexander the Great and then to Ireland for the second series of The Irish R.M..

Sykes directed The Lost Secret for the BBC and The Defectors for Video Arts

In the 1990s, he taught scriptwriting at the University of Winchester while also directing for Danish television.

Sykes died in 2006.

== Selected filmography ==
- South Bank (1964) (documentary) - assistant editor
- Walkabout to Cornwall (1966) (documentary about surfers) - director
- Britain Around the World (1967) (17 short documentaries) - director
- The Avengers (1967–68) (TV series) - director
- Tell Me Lies (1968) - documentary about the play US - executive producer
- The Committee (1968) - director, writer
- Venom (aka The Legend of Spider Forest) (1971) - director
- Demons of the Mind (1972) - director
- The House in Nightmare Park (1973) - director
- Steptoe and Son Ride Again (1973) - director
- Orson Welles Great Mysteries (1973–74) (TV series) - director
- To the Devil a Daughter (1976) - director
- Les magiciens du futur (1978) (TV movie) - director
- Jesus (1979) - director
- Emmerdale (1980) (TV series) - director
- The Search for Alexander the Great (1981) (TV series) - director
- The Blues Band (1981) - director
- The Irish R.M. (1984) (TV series) - director
- The Lost Secret (1985) - director
- MAC Satellite Broadcasting (1988) (documentary) - director
- The Other Britain (1989) (documentary) - director
- Castle of Holstebro (1990) - director
- The Merger (1995) (TV drama) - director
- Kaosmos (1996) (Danish TV) - director

== Notes ==
- Gilbert, Basil (July 1977). "Peter Sykes". Cinema Papers. pp. 34–36, 95.
