= Blood from the Mummy's Tomb =

1971 film by Seth Holt

- Theatrical release poster
- Directed by: Seth Holt (Note: Completed by Michael Carreras after Holt's death.)
- Written by: Christopher Wicking
- Based on: The Jewel of Seven Stars by Bram Stoker
- Produced by: Howard Brandy
- Starring: Valerie Leon; Andrew Keir; Mark Edwards; James Villiers; Hugh Burden; George Coulouris
- Cinematography: Arthur Grant
- Edited by: Peter Weatherley
- Music by: Tristram Cary
- Production company: Hammer Film Productions
- Distributed by: MGM-EMI Distributors (UK)
- Release date: 14 October 1971 (UK)
- Running time: 94 minutes
- Country: United Kingdom
- Language: English
- Budget: £200,000

Blood from the Mummy's Tomb is a 1971 British horror film from Hammer Film Productions. It was director Seth Holt's final film, as he died partway through production, and the film was completed by Michael Carreras. It stars Andrew Keir, Valerie Leon, James Villiers, Hugh Burden and George Coulouris. The screenplay by Christopher Wicking is loosely based on Bram Stoker's 1903 novel The Jewel of Seven Stars.

Despite its troubled production, including the death of Holt and the premature departure of original star Peter Cushing, Blood from the Mummy's Tomb has also been called one of Hammer's best films of the 1970s. It was the fourth and final of Hammer's Mummy films, and released by MGM-EMI as the support feature to Dr. Jekyll and Sister Hyde on 14 October 1971.

== Plot ==
An expedition led by Professor Fuchs locates the unmarked tomb of Tera, an evil Egyptian queen. A cabal of priests drugged her into a state of suspended animation and buried all of her relics with her. Fuchs is obsessed with Tera and takes her mummy and sarcophagus back to England, where he secretly recreates her tomb under his house. Four days "before her birthday", his daughter Margaret – who bears an uncanny resemblance to Tera and was born at the instant they recited her name – has recurring nightmares. Fuchs gives her the old queen's ring and tells her to "wear it always". This only makes matters worse. Queen Tera's evil power begins to tempt Margaret, as she learns how she is feared by her father's former colleagues.

Margaret notices a man lurking in the vacant building across the street. He is Corbeck, an expedition member who is now her father's rival. Corbeck wants to restore Tera to life, and he persuades Margaret to help him gather the missing relics. However, each time one is given up the person who had held it dies. When they have all the relics, Corbeck, Margaret and Fuchs begin the ancient ritual to reawaken Tera. At the last moment Fuchs learns that the queen's revival will mean Margaret's death. Together Fuchs and Margaret overpower and kill Corbeck, as the house quakes above them. Queen Tera awakens and kills Fuchs, but not before Margaret stabs her. As Margaret and Tera grapple for an ancient dagger, the house finally collapses on them.

Later in the hospital, a woman's face is wrapped in bandages. She is the sole survivor; all the others in the Professor's basement were "crushed beyond recognition". The bandaged woman slowly opens her eyes and struggles to speak, leaving it ambiguous whether she is Margaret Fuchs or Queen Tera.

== Cast ==
- Andrew Keir as Julian Fuchs
- Valerie Leon as Margaret Fuchs/Queen Tera
- James Villiers as Eugene Corbeck
- Hugh Burden as Geoffrey Dandridge
- George Coulouris as Berigan
- Mark Edwards as Tod Browning
- Rosalie Crutchley as Helen Dickerson
- Aubrey Morris as Doctor Putnam
- David Markham as Doctor Burgess
- Tamara Ustinov as Veronica
- Joan Young as Mrs. Caporal
- James Cossins and David Jackson as asylum nurses

== Production ==
=== Development ===
Writer Chris Wicking said the film was one of the last projects that James Carreras brought to Hammer. Wicking wanted to use the title of the book but Carreras did not. They brainstormed titles and came up with Blood from the Mummy's Tomb, which Wicking thought they would never use, but they did.

Finance came from EMI Films.

The job of directing went to Seth Holt, whose films were admired by producer Howard Brandy. Holt had a strong critical reputation for making such films as The Nanny, but had not made a movie in two years. As Holt said in 1971: "I haven't been directing because I haven't been offered anything to direct".

Wicking worked with Seth Holt on the script. The film had to go into production early because there was a gap in the production schedule. Wicking said he had a falling out with producer Howard Brandy and was barred from the set but he continued to work with Holt in the evenings.

Brandy later claimed Wicking's script was "unshootable" and that Holt constantly rewrote it. He also says he and Holt wanted to cast Amy Grant in the lead but Sir James Carreras insisted on Valerie Leon.

=== Shooting ===
Peter Cushing was cast in the film and completed one day's filming before leaving the production after his wife was diagnosed with emphysema. Cushing was replaced by Andrew Keir. The R1 DVD of the film released in the United States by Anchor Bay Entertainment contains still photographs of Cushing's day on the production.

Director Seth Holt died of a heart attack five weeks into the six-week shoot, collapsing into cast member Aubrey Morris's arms and dying on set. Michael Carreras asked Don Sharp to take over but the director was unable to as he had signed to direct a film in Israel for the producer of Puppet on a Chain (this film was ultimately not made).

Michael Carreras directed the final week's filming, notably all of George Coulouris' scenes. He said Holt's footage did not cut together.

According to the book Hammer, House of Horror: Behind the Screams by Howard Maxford, the budget for the film was £200,000. The film was shot at Elstree Studios in Hertfordshire.

== Release ==
In January 1972, AIP bought the US distribution rights.

== Critical reception ==
The Monthly Film Bulletin wrote: "Seth Holt died while shooting Blood from the Mummy's Tomb; the final week's work was directed by Michael Carreras, who obviously made every effort to adopt Holt's visual style. Holt, however, was apparently revising his script day-by-day, and the stylistic consistency of the completed film cannot mask a number of unresolved themes and ideas. For all that, Blood from the Mummy's Tomb is Holt's most distinctive work, and effortlessly the best of Hammer's recent attempts to 'develop' the classic horror themes. The explanatory background that conventionally emerges in a few garbled words during or after the climax in horror movies, here becomes the substance of the whole first half of the film: a mythic, amoral deity is built up, and an entire attendant cosmogony suggested, through astrological references and other choice details. After this, the main drama of the film centres on the debate between Fuchs and Corbeck on the morality of releasing power like Tera's in a world like ours. 'Our world' is in turn the subject of Holt's most characteristically jaundiced view. A surface of perversity and fear barely contains undergrowths of madness, chaos and destruction. Several of the film's scenes occur in a lunatic asylum (where George Coulouris is victim to two of the most gleefully sadistic warders since Lost Weekend); other characters are frequently seen alone in moments of private mania. The young hero (name of Tod Browning, so that you know he's all right) is killed before he has a chance to do anything effectual. And in a breathtaking reversal, Holt saves his all-too-human 'mummy' for his final shot: where she is Margaret, swathed in hospital bandages after the catastrophe. It's all as if Holt had superimposed the psychological-suspense methods of his thrillers on to the Gothic mechanics of the genre; the result (as in the work of all true pioneers) makes the genre seem like new."

AllMovie's review of the film was favourable, commending its "glamorous style" and "creepy atmosphere".

Empire magazine gave it three out of five.

The New York Times called it "tremendous fun, skilful and wonderfully energetic".

Variety called it "polished and well-acted but rather tame".

== Legacy ==
According to Filmink "over time, a devoted cult has grown around" the film, "partly due to the sexiness of Seth Holt's death, but also the qualities of the film. There is a magic about Blood from the Mummy's Tomb, at least to its fans. It's not completely well realised, but there is so much to admire: the professionalism of Andrew Keir, the splendid villainy of James Villiers and James Cossins (who plays a sadistic nurse), the bewitching Valerie Leon (who genuinely seems like she stepped out of the Ancient past), Tristram Carey's superbly eerie musical score, Scott MacGregor's enjoyable production design."

== See also ==
- The Awakening (1980) – another film based on The Jewel of Seven Stars
