= Shoot to Kill (1960 film) =

British film by Michael Winner

- Lobby card
- Directed by: Michael Winner
- Written by: Michael Winner
- Produced by: Olive Negus-Fancey
- Starring: Dermot Walsh; Joy Webster; John M. East
- Cinematography: Adolph Burger
- Edited by: Monica Kimick
- Music by: Cy Payne
- Production company: E.J. Fancey Productions
- Distributed by: New Realm Pictures
- Release date: 1960
- Running time: 63 minutes
- Country: United Kingdom
- Language: English

Shoot to Kill is a 1960 British second feature ('B') crime film directed and written by Michael Winner and starring Dermot Walsh, Joy Webster and John M. East. It was Winner's first film as a director, and Lynn Redgrave's first film role.

== Plot ==
Showbiz reporter Mike Roberts and diplomatic correspondent Lee Fisher tackle Communist agent Boris Altovitch and his mob, who have kidnapped the daughter of a nuclear scientist, to force him to reveal information. The pair triumph, and fall in love.

== Cast ==
- Dermot Walsh as Mike Roberts
- Joy Webster as Lee Fisher
- John M. East as Boris Altovitch
- Frank Hawkins as Neale Patterson
- Zoreen Ismail as Anna
- Theodore Wilhelm as Nikolai
- Victor Beaumont as Nauman
- Ronald Adam as Wood
- Lynn Redgrave in a bit part (uncredited)

== Critical reception ==
The Monthly Film Bulletin wrote: A cramped and clumsy spy thriller, set in Geneva, and trite in every respect."

Kine Weekly wrote: "The script puts punch before plausibility, its acting, too, is more muscular than polished, and many of the verbal exchanges are trite, but exuberant rough and tumbles, shrewdly spaced and presented against an authentic backdrop, just keep its modest end up. ... The picture crowds plenty into its convenient running time, but, humour, romance and villainy are clumsily mixed. Dermot Walsh makes the best of a tough assignment as Mike, and Frank Hawkins registers as Neale, but Jay Webster is no glamour girl or Sarah Bernhardt as Lee, and the less said about the rest the better. Its Geneva backgrounds are, however, the real thing and lend a touch of validity to the extravagant hanky-panky. As a thriller, it's a passable travelogue."
