= Walkabout to Cornwall =

1966 British documentary by Peter Sykes

Walkabout to Cornwall is a 1966 British feature documentary about Australian surfers in Cornwall, directed by Peter Sykes.
