= The Secret War of Jackie's Girls =

1980 film

- Genre: Action; Drama
- Written by: Ann Donahue; D. Guthrie; Theodore Jonas; Jean Ross Kondek
- Directed by: Gordon Hessler
- Starring: Lee Purcell; Mariette Hartley; Dee Wallace
- Music by: Fred Karlin
- Country of origin: United States
- Original language: English

Production
- Executive producers: Florence Small; Jon Surgal
- Producer: Dorothy J. Bailey
- Cinematography: William Cronjager
- Editors: Beryl Gelfond; Larry Lester; Michael S. Murphy; Larry Strong; Jean-Marc Vasseur
- Running time: 100 min.
- Production companies: Penthouse Productions; Public Art Films; Universal Television

Original release
- Network: NBC
- Release: November 29, 1980

The Secret War of Jackie's Girls is a 1980 American TV movie that was conceived as a pilot but never went to series. It is about female pilots who undertake secret missions in World War II. The pilot was directed by Gordon Hessler.

== Cast ==
- Lee Purcell
- Mariette Hartley
- Dee Wallace

== Production ==
The success of Charlie's Angels in the 1976-77 ratings season prompted all the American TV networks to feature more sexy young women in action-orientated roles, either adding them to existing programs or introducing new shows that focused on them. NBC picked up The Bionic Woman from ABC and also added young female characters to the 1977-78 seasons of Baa Baa Black Sheep and BJ and the Bear. They introduced several new shows with female sex symbol leads such as Quark, The Roller Girls and Who's Watching the Kids?, as well as commissioning pilots for several series which were direct imitations of Charlie's Angels: The Secret War of Jackie's Girls, The Hunted Lady and Cover Girls.

== Reception ==
The Los Angeles Times said "the aerial photography... is quite marvellous."

== Notes ==
- Hilmes, Mary (2007). NBC: America's Network. University of California Press. ISBN 9780520250819.
