= Victor Beaumont =

German-British actor (1912–1977)

- Beaumont in Where Eagles Dare (1968)
- Born: Paul Viktor Max Oskar Symonds; 7 November 1912; Berlin-Schöneberg, German Empire
- Died: 21 March 1977 (aged 64); London, England
- Occupation: Actor
- Years active: 1930s–1977

Paul Viktor Max Oskar Symonds (7 November 1912 – 21 March 1977), known by his stage name Victor Beaumont, was a German-British actor.

== Early life ==
Beaumont was born Paul Viktor Max Oskar Symonds in Berlin-Schöneberg in 1912, to Edward Symonds and Else, née Scholz. His father was a Captain in the British Army and an aide to the British military attaché in Berlin. Else Symonds was the godmother of German actress Brigitte Helm, and Beaumont made his film acting debut opposite Helm as an extra in the silent film Metropolis (1927).

He studied psychology and pedagogy at the Sorbonne in Paris. Shortly before the outbreak of World War II, Beaumont moved to Great Britain, where he had citizenship through his father.

== Career ==
Symonds appeared in British films and television dramas from the 1940s and Hollywood films from the 1960s, adopting the stage name Victor Beaumont. He is perhaps best known for his portrayals of Nazi officers in films such as Where Eagles Dare (1968) in which he played Colonel Weissner, Carve Her Name with Pride (1958), The Guns of Navarone (1961), and The Heroes of Telemark (1965). His television appearances included two episodes of The Saint and a cameo appearance in the opening episode, 'Departure and Arrival', as Dr. Hauser in the short-lived, six-episode BBC sci-fi drama series Moonbase 3 (1973).

In the early 1970s, Beaumont moved back to Berlin and appeared in West German films and TV series. He had a memorable comic role as a psychologist in Willy Wonka & the Chocolate Factory (1971).

== Personal life ==
=== Sexual abuse conviction ===
In 1946, Beaumont was sentenced to ten years in prison for the sexual abuse of a teenage boy. He had previously been brought up on charges in 1939 and 1942.

A 2013 article in the Daily Mirror claimed Beaumont was an associate of Jimmy Savile, citing an anonymous victim of Savile's.

=== Death ===
Beaumont died of leukemia at the Royal Free Hospital in London on 21 March 1977, aged 64.

== Selected filmography ==
- The Next of Kin (1942) as German Colonel (uncredited)
- The First of the Few (1942) as Von Crantz
- Thunder Rock (1942) as Hans (uncredited)
- Tomorrow We Live (1943) as Rabineau
- We Dive at Dawn (1943) as German Airman (uncredited)
- Reach for the Sky (1956) as German Doctor (uncredited)
- Man from Tangier (1957) as Film Director (uncredited)
- Carve Her Name with Pride (1958) as German Colonel (uncredited)
- I Was Monty's Double (1958) as Gottmann (Commando)
- Mark of the Phoenix (1958) as Travel Clerk
- The Square Peg (1958) as Lt. Jogenkraut
- Sink the Bismarck! (1960) as Officer on the 'Bismarck' (uncredited)
- The Criminal (1960) as 2nd Man at Party (uncredited)
- Shoot to Kill (1960) as Nauman
- The Guns of Navarone (1961) as German Officer in Gun Cave (uncredited)
- The Night We Dropped a Clanger (1961) as Factory Commandant
- Freud: The Secret Passion (1962) as Dr. Guber
- The Password Is Courage (1962) as German Officer in Retreating Column (uncredited)
- Master Spy (1963) as Petrov
- Jeff Gordon, Secret Agent (1963) as Grégori
- The Bay of St Michel (1963) as Man
- A Shot in the Dark (1964) as Gendarme
- The Train (1964) (uncredited)
- The Heroes of Telemark (1965) as German Sergeant
- Thunderball (1965) as SPECTRE No. 3 (uncredited)
- The Quiller Memorandum (1966) as Weiss, Bowling Alley Manager (uncredited)
- Frozen Flashes (1966) as Chief of British Secret Service
- The Night of the Generals (1967) as SS Officer (uncredited)
- Attack on the Iron Coast (1968) as German Battery Commander (uncredited)
- Where Eagles Dare (1968) as Col. Weissner
- The Assassination Bureau (1969) as von Pinck's Aide (uncredited)
- The Kremlin Letter (1970) as The Dentist
- Willy Wonka & the Chocolate Factory (1971) as Doctor (uncredited)
