= Gordon Hessler =

British film director, producer and screenwriter

- Born: 12 December 1925; Berlin, Germany
- Died: 19 January 2014 (aged 88); London, England
- Occupations: film and television director
- Years active: 1950-2014

Gordon Hessler (12 December 1925 – 19 January 2014) was a German-born British film and television director, screenwriter, and producer.

== Biography ==
=== Early years ===
Born in Berlin, Germany, he was raised in England and studied at the University of Reading. While a teenager, he moved to the United States and directed a series of short films and documentaries.

=== Television ===
Universal Studios hired Hessler as a story reader for the Alfred Hitchcock Presents television series. He became story editor for two seasons (1960–1962) for that series, then served as the associate producer for The Alfred Hitchcock Hour from 1962 until its cancellation in 1965. He also directed episodes of that series.

Hessler then directed his first feature, a low budget thriller The Woman Who Wouldn't Die (1965), aka Catacombs.

He returned to television producing Run for Your Life (1966) and directing episodes of Bob Hope Presents the Chrysler Theatre.

He directed The Last Shot You Hear with filming started in 1967 but it was not released until 1969, which was the last film from Robert L. Lippert.

=== AIP ===
American International Pictures asked Hessler to step in to produce and direct The Oblong Box (1969), starring Vincent Price, when Michael Reeves became unavailable. It was written by Christopher Wicking with whom Hessler would make four more movies.

AIP liked Hessler's work and called him in to do some uncredited directing on De Sade (1969), then reteamed him with Price and Wicking in Scream and Scream Again (1970), this time co starring Christopher Lee and Peter Cushing.

Hessler did a third with Price and Wicking for AIP, Cry of the Banshee (1970). Price was meant to be in Hessler's (and Wicking's) next film, a version of Murders in the Rue Morgue (1971), but clashed with AIP so Jason Robards played the lead instead. In an article in Sight and Sound it was said Hessler "has an almost instantly recognisable visual style, perhaps dating from his documentary days, which gives all his films a suggestion of the surreal. His fluid camera... stalks and encircles the characters like a sadistic probe, and the result is somehow both evocative and unnerving."

Hessler directed a thriller Embassy (1972), then Medusa (1973) with George Hamilton, the last movie he made written by Wicking.

Hessler did a TV movie with Bette Davis, Scream, Pretty Peggy (1973) then made the Ray Harryhausen adventure The Golden Voyage of Sinbad (1974).

=== Television ===
Despite the success of Sinbad Hessler focused on television movies: Skyway to Death (1974), Hitchhike! (1974), A Cry in the Wilderness (1974), and Betrayal (1974).

He also directed episodes of Lucas Tanner, Amy Prentiss, Kolchak: The Night Stalker, Kung Fu, Switch, The Blue Knight, Spencer's Pilots, The Eddie Capra Mysteries, Wonder Woman, CHiPs, and Hawaii Five-O.

He directed Secrets of Three Hungry Wives (1978), Kiss Meets the Phantom of the Park, Puzzle (1978), The Secret War of Jackie's Girls (1980), Tales of the Haunted (1981), California Cowboys (1983), Pray for Death (1985), The Misfit Brigade (1987) and Rage of Honor (1988) as well as episode of Shannon, The Master, Tales of the Unexpected and The Equalizer.

=== Later career ===
Hessler wrote and directed The Girl in a Swing (1988) starring Meg Tilly, an adaptation of Richard Adams's novel. His later films include Out on Bail (1989) and Journey of Honor (1990).

Hessler died in his sleep on 19 January 2014.

== Filmography ==
- Catacombs (1965)
- The Last Shot You Hear (1969)
- The Oblong Box (1969)
- Scream and Scream Again (1970)
- Cry of the Banshee (1970)
- Murders in the Rue Morgue (1971)
- Embassy (1972)
- Medusa (1973)
- Scream, Pretty Peggy (1973)
- The Golden Voyage of Sinbad (1973)
- Skyway to Death (1974)
- Hitchhike! (1974)
- A Cry in the Wilderness (1974)
- Betrayal (1974)
- Puzzle (1978)
- Kiss Meets the Phantom of the Park (1978)
- Secrets of Three Hungry Wives (1978)
- The Secret War of Jackie's Girls (1980)
- Pray for Death (1985)
- Rage of Honor (1987)
- The Misfit Brigade (1987)
- The Girl in a Swing (1988)
- Journey of Honor or Shogun Mayeda or Kabuto (1990)
