= Cry of the Banshee =

1970 British film by Gordon Hessler

- Theatrical release poster.
- Directed by: Gordon Hessler
- Written by: Tim Kelly; Christopher Wicking (screenplay)
- Based on: story by Tim Kelly
- Produced by: Louis M. Heyward; Executive; Samuel Z. Arkoff; James H. Nicholson; Gordon Hessler
- Starring: Vincent Price; Elisabeth Bergner; Essy Persson; Hugh Griffith; Patrick Mower; Hilary Dwyer; Sally Geeson
- Cinematography: John Coquillon
- Edited by: Oswald Hafenrichter
- Music by: Les Baxter (U.S theatrical version); Wilfred Josephs (uncut version)
- Distributed by: American International Pictures
- Release date: 22 July 1970 (U.S. release)
- Running time: 87 minutes (U.S theatrical version); 91 minutes (director's cut)
- Country: United Kingdom
- Language: English
- Budget: $450,000–$500,000 (est.)
- Box office: $1,306,000 (US/ Canada rentals)

Cry of the Banshee is a 1970 British horror film directed by Gordon Hessler and starring Vincent Price. It was released by American International Pictures. It was written by Tim Kelly and Christopher Wicking. Despite the tagline reading "Edgar Allan Poe probes new depths of Terror!" the film is completely unrelated to Poe's work, apart from quoting five lines of his 1849 poem "The Bells" before the opening credits.

The title credit sequence was animated by Terry Gilliam.

== Plot ==
The film is set in Elizabethan England. Assisted by Sean, Lord Edward Whitman, a wicked magistrate, goes hunting in the hills for witches. His armed posse breaks up a Satanic Black Sabbath. He kills several of the witches and tells the rest to scatter to the hills and never return. This angers the leader of the coven, Oona. To get revenge on the Whitman family, Oona summons a demonic spirit to destroy the family. Unfortunately, the spirit takes possession of the loyal servant, Roderick, who Maureen Whitman has been in love with for years.

Whitman presides over the trial of a young woman, Maggie. Ruling that she is a witch, he has her branded, whipped through the streets, then placed in the village stocks. That night, Whitman hosts a feast at his home as his henchmen search the countryside for the killers of a sheep. Two poor teenagers are pulled into the hall. A burst of wolf-like howling from outside the walls warns that they may be "devil-marked". Both are killed in an ensuing struggle. Whitman's wife, Lady Patricia, calls Whitman a murderer for this. When Whitman's oldest son, Sean, rapes Lady Patricia, Whitman decides he wants to "clean up" the witches in the area. Afterwards, Lady Patricia is traumatized and finds comfort in Roderick's presence. Harry, Whitman's son from Cambridge, and a priest named Father Tom, come and join the witch hunts.

Sean Whitman is attacked and killed by a bewitched dog when he and a group of his friends were returning after terrorizing a tavern and the serving wenches there. At the funeral of Sean, Harry and a hunting party find the mad dog that killed Sean and kill it.

At the celebration of the mad dog's death and avenging Sean, Lady Patricia has a breakdown seeing the dog's severed head and she declares that the house of Whitman is cursed. She is only calmed down by Roderick. Whitman and his witch hunters question and torture Maggie to get information about Oona. Maggie confesses to being a witch after being tortured and dies before she can reveal where Oona is, leaving it a riddle "what is born in fire, dies in fire."

Lady Patricia is awakened that night and hears Roderick at her bedroom door; she opens the door but he was not there. She is then attacked by a werewolf-like creature and mauled to death as she flees through the house. Whitman, after seeing Lady Patricia's gray corpse with open eyes at her funeral, declares that it is witchcraft. He is determined to find and kill Oona for her witchcraft and for causing the death of Sean and Lady Patricia. Whitman declares that he will kill anyone he has to in order to find Oona. In order to intimidate the villagers, an innocent tavern wench, Bess, is put on the breaking wheel and burned alive when Bully Boy claims that she knows the heathen ways.

Eventually, Harry and Father Tom follow a secret passage through an open grave and find a grave robber that tells them where the answer to Maggie's riddle is. Whitman discovers Roderick in bed with Maureen and beats him before Whitman has him imprisoned in the torture chamber of the basement.

They find Oona and her coven conjuring the death of Maureen. Oona claims that Roderick never existed, that he is only a sidhe. Harry kills Oona. Roderick, who had escaped and was attacking Maureen, breaks off and leaves her. Harry, Father Tom, and Whitman return and find Maureen alive and unconscious. Harry, Father Tom, and most of the witch hunters go to hunt down Roderick; leaving Whitman in the house and Maureen locked safely in the basement. However, Roderick returns and reunites with Maureen. He begins to transform into the werewolf-like demon and attacks Whitman. Maureen shoots the demon in the face, apparently killing him.

Exhilarated that the curse is over, Whitman plans to leave the house by coach with his remaining children. On the way, he stops at the cemetery so he can reassure himself Roderick is dead. To his horror, he finds the coffin empty. Shocked, Whitman hurries back to the carriage. Once inside, he finds Maureen and Harry dead. It is revealed that his driver, Bully Boy, was killed by Roderick, who is now driving the coach. The film ends with Whitman screeching his driver's name in terror as the coach heads for parts unknown.

== Cast ==
- Vincent Price as Lord Edward Whitman
- Hilary Dwyer as Maureen Whitman
- Essy Persson as Lady Patricia Whitman
- Hugh Griffith as Mickey
- Patrick Mower as Roderick
- Elisabeth Bergner as Oona
- Carl Rigg as Harry Whitman
- Sally Geeson as Sarah
- Stephan Chase as Sean Whitman
- Marshall Jones as Father Tom
- Andrew McCulloch as Bully Boy
- Michael Elphick as Burke
- Pamela Moiseiwitsch as maid
- Richard Everrett as Timothy
- Peter Benson as Brander
- Robert Hutton as party guest
- Pamela Farbrother as Margaret
- Jan Rossini as Bess
- Quinn O'Hara as Maggie
- Guy Deghy as party guest
- Joyce Mandre as party guest
- Jane Deady as naked girl

Additionally, Stephen Rea appears as one of thirteen credited "villagers" in his film debut.

== Production ==
=== Script ===
Gordon Hessler did not like Tim Kelly's original script and hired Chris Wicking to rewrite it. Hessler says he would have asked Wicking to change it further and improving the witch characters, but AIP would not let him.

Hessler said "The film was sold and we had to have it finished by a certain time." He and Wicking went to Scotland to make a different picture about witches. They talked to witches and researched their history and made the witches more sympathetic. According to Hessler, "the whole of AIP got so alarmed because we were changing it so much. They came down on us and said that we could alter it 10 percent, but no more than that. So all of our work went down the drain on Cry of the Banshee Out of all the films I did for AIP, I think it's the least interesting."

Wicking says he saw the film as a Jacobean revenge tragedy "but I didn't want to tell anybody that because they'd hate that."

=== Casting ===
Elisabeth Bergner made her first appearance in an English film in 30 years. Hessler says AIP's head of British production "Deke" Hayward "would try to find some well known actor to dress up the picture – who at least Americans would be familiar with – which was a good idea." For this film Hayward suggested Hessler cast Elisabeth Bergner. "She was marvelous, out of her depths and aged at the time, and playing a very strange part. But she gave it her everything." Price says Bergner told him she took the part "because she wanted to be seen".

Hessler thought Hilary Dwyer was under contract to AIP. "I don't know what the situation was, but they liked her and they kept pushing you to use certain actors. I guess the management must have thought she was star material or something like that."

=== Shooting ===
Filming started November 1969. It took place at Grim's Dyke, the former home of the dramatist W. S. Gilbert in Harrow Weald, London.

"It's becoming harder and harder to scare people," said Price during filming. "We still rely on the basic elements of fear: snake, rats, claustrophobia, but we're adding all the time."

Hessler remembers when they did the film Price "was very upset with AIP" over contractual issues. "When we had the wrap party, he didn't want to come if Arkoff was there. I told him that I wouldn't dream of having the party without him. So he came, and of course he was quite drunk." Hessler says at the party everyone was in costume and a girl jumped out of a cake. "When we were looking for the knife to cut the cake, Vincent said, 'Take the knife that's in my back and use that!' " However, following the making of the film, Price signed a four-picture contract with AIP over two years.

=== Music ===
Hessler wanted Bernard Herrmann to do the score but AIP could not afford him. The original music score was composed by Wilfred Josephs but AIP decided not to use it, commissioning a score by Les Baxter instead. Josephs' score was restored in the later uncut DVD releases. Hessler later said "Wilfred Josephs' music held the picture up, it made it more mysterious."

AIP also removed Terry Gilliam's animation credits. Hessler said, "Deke was the one who put that animation in, always being way in advance of everyone else. About the music, I suspect that Les Baxter was a great friend of somebody high up at AIP ... But to have Les Baxter do a kind of period picture where you have minuet dancing and that sort of thing, it's ludicrous. You really have to have somebody who has an idea of that time period."

== Release ==
The US theatrical release featured the GP-rated print which replaced the opening animated credits with still ones, completely altered the music score, and was cut to remove all footage of topless nudity and to tone down assorted whippings and assault scenes. This print was also used for the original UK cinema release in 1970. The film was a commercial success but Hessler was dissatisfied with it and called it the least interesting of the four movies he made for AIP.

== Critical reception ==
In The Monthly Film Bulletin, David Pirie wrote:

Despite a fairly interesting subject – witchcraft versus the Establishment in 16th century England – Cry of the Banshee must go down as one of the weakest offerings yet from the Gordon Hessler–Chris Wicking team. Hessler's camera has the same restless, energetic quality as before, but only seems tiresome in the context of a production as tatty as this one. Where the plot cries out for some telling locations, it gets instead a series of meagre studio sets, and with the atmosphere consequently negligible the action centres mainly on sadistic sexuality as the next best thing to genuine horror. Admittedly, it is gratifying to find a film which for once treats the 'old religion' with sympathy, but one can't help suspecting that the juxtaposition of the Establishment and the witches here becomes just an excuse to pile on the decadence. In any case, the overall skimpiness of the production doesn't allow the theme any room for development, and one is left hoping that AIP's main horror specialists (including that fine cameraman John Coquillon, whose work has so influenced the genre) aren't going to be reduced to this level in future. Elisabeth Bergner's return to the screen, incidentally, is not exactly auspicious.

Kine Weekly wrote:

A lot of eerie business and an expert cast make this most acceptable horror entertainment. Setting this story in the darker ages gives it the advantages of being splendidly costumed and, of course, making its general atmosphere of superstition as credible as possible. The satanic cavortings are very effectively staged and the subsequent, horrid "slaughter of the Wickham family is given an aura of justifiable fate by the really very naughty way in which at least two of the family persecute suspected witchcraft with fire and torture – and obviously enjoy it. The plot is easy to follow moves at a good pace and spaces its horror well. An expert cast plays it for all it is worth. Vincent Price as Lord Edward, is, of course, well in command of his own special cinema territory, and older cinemagoers will be interested to see Elisabeth Bergner's return as the superwitch, Oona. They are very well supported by a cast in which Hugh Griffith supplies the only intended humour as an eccentric grave-digger, who is, incidentally, kept pretty busy.

The Radio Times Guide to Films gave the film 2/5 stars, writing: "The last period horror Vincent Price made finds the flamboyant villain back in Witchfinder General territory as an obsessed 16th-century witch-hunting magistrate hounded by demonic forces. Veteran actress Elisabeth Bergner (her name was misspelt on the original credits) plays the witch who unleashes werewolf-in-disguise Patrick Mower on the hedonistic patriarch. Director Gordon Hessler's lightweight chiller is a rather coy affair that's neither sexy nor spooky enough."

Leslie Halliwell said: "Modest horror film, which fails to do justice to the interesting plot."

== Home video release ==
In April 1991, Cry of the Banshee was packaged as a Laserdisc double feature (Catalog Number ID7661HB), paired with the first of the Count Yorga movies, Count Yorga, Vampire (1970). Both films were not letterboxed, but employed a full screen, pan-and-scan process.

The 1988 UK Guild video release featured the same heavily edited print as the US and UK cinema ones. All DVD releases, however, have featured the full uncut version, which also restores the original Wilfred Josephs music score.

The 2016 Blu-Ray release by Shout! Studios (under their sublabel Scream Factory) as part of the Vincent Price Collection III features a new high definition master for both the original 87-minute theatrical cut and the 91-minute unrated director's cut.

== Trivia ==
- The titular "cry of the banshee" is a signal that someone will die. This is a Celtic legend about a type of ghost and has nothing to do with Satanism. However, "the cry of the banshee" is repeatedly referenced in the banquet sequence of the film during which the two local juveniles are murdered.
- The film was played at the first Quentin Tarantino Film Festival in 1997 at the Dobie residence hall near the University of Texas.
- It is mentioned in the Rob Zombie song "Demonoid Phenomenon," from his 1998 album Hellbilly Deluxe.
- The title of the film inspired the name of the post-punk band Siouxsie and The Banshees.
