= Christopher Wicking =

British screenwriter (1943–2008)

- Born: 1943; London, England; United Kingdom
- Died: 2008 (aged 64–65); Toulouse, France
- Occupations: Film and television screenwriter
- Spouse: the stage director Lily Susan Todd

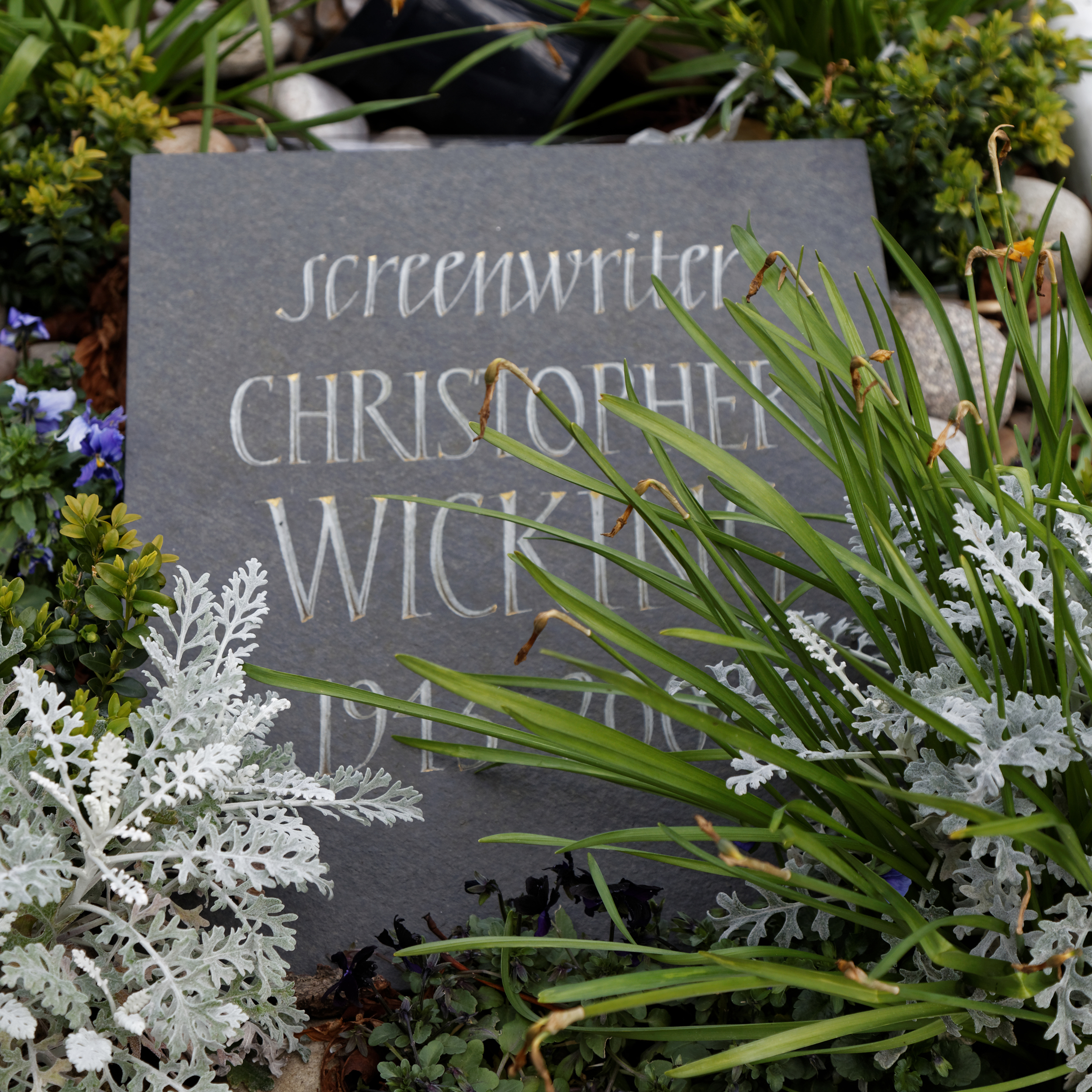
Christopher Wicking grave stone in the City of London Cemetery, Newham

Christopher Wicking (10 January 1943 – 13 October 2008), also known as Chris Wicking, was a British screenwriter, often in the horror and fantasy genres, notably for the British arm of American International Pictures and with Hammer Film Productions, for whom he was the last 'resident script editor'.

== Early life ==
Wicking was born in London and educated at Coopers' Company's School. While studying at St Martin's School of Art, London, he determined to break into the film industry.

== Movies ==
He began as a film booking clerk for Anglo-Amalgamated Film Distributors and, while working as an assistant film editor on documentaries in London, he began writing profiles of directors for the influential French movie magazine Cahiers du cinéma. He was a lifelong fan of westerns and wrote movie feature articles and interviews about the genre for various British magazines including the Monthly Film Bulletin and Time Out. He also continued to write for French magazines including Cahiers du cinéma, Positif and Midi Minuit Fantastique.

His first credit as a screenwriter was on the 1969 movie The Oblong Box, initially with Michael Reeves and, after Reeves' death, for director Gordon Hessler. Although Wicking was only credited for "additional dialogue", Hessler later verbally credited him as writing the entire filmed script. Wicking worked on the troubled Blood from the Mummy's Tomb.

== Television ==
Wicking also wrote episodes for British TV series The Professionals (1979–1982), Jemima Shore Investigates and the TV dramas The Way to Dusty Death (1995), On Dangerous Ground (1996). and Powers (2004).

== Later years ==
He taught screenwriting at various UK institutions including the Royal College of Art, the Arvon Foundation, the National Film and Television School, Leeds Metropolitan University and King Alfred's College, Winchester; and, in Ireland, at University College Dublin, the Dublin Institute of Technology and the Irish Film Institute's Education Department. It was said that he had a fondness for "termite art" - less "precious" work that valued personal vision and idiosyncrasy.

Wicking died of a heart attack in Toulouse, France, on 13 October 2008.

He is buried at the City of London Cemetery and Crematorium.

== Works ==
=== Feature films ===
- The Oblong Box (1969) (additional dialogue)
- Scream and Scream Again (1970)
- Cry of the Banshee (1970)
- Venom (1971)
- Murders in the Rue Morgue (1971) (co-writer)
- Blood from the Mummy's Tomb (1971)
- Demons of the Mind (1972)
- Medusa (1973)
- To the Devil a Daughter (1976) (co-writer)
- Lady Chatterley's Lover (co-writer) (1981)
- Absolute Beginners (1986) (co-writer)
- Dream Demon (1988)

=== Television Episodes ===
- The Professionals

The Madness of Mickey Hamilton (1979); The Gun (1980); Discovered in a Graveyard (1982)

=== Book ===
- Vahimagi, Tise + Wicking, Christopher (1979). The American Vein: Directors and Directions in Television. Talisman Books ISBN 0-905983-16-5 / ISBN 978-0-905983-16-5
