= Demons of the Mind =

1972 British film by Peter Sykes

- Theatrical release poster
- Directed by: Peter Sykes
- Written by: Christopher Wicking
- Story by: Frank Godwin
- Produced by: Michael Carreras; Frank Godwin
- Starring: Paul Jones; Patrick Magee; Yvonne Mitchell; Robert Hardy; Gillian Hills; Michael Hordern; Kenneth J. Warren
- Cinematography: Arthur Grant
- Edited by: Chris Barnes
- Music by: Harry Robinson
- Production companies: Frank Godwin Productions; Hammer Film Productions
- Distributed by: MGM-EMI Distributors
- Release date: 5 November 1972
- Running time: 89 minutes
- Country: United Kingdom
- Language: English
- Budget: £250,000 or £190,000

Demons of the Mind is a 1972 British horror film, directed by Peter Sykes and starring Paul Jones, Gillian Hills, Robert Hardy, Patrick Magee, Michael Hordern and Shane Briant. It was produced by Anglo-EMI, Frank Godwin Productions and Hammer Film Productions, and written by Christopher Wicking, based on a story by Frank Godwin.

== Plot ==
A wealthy widower locks up his two grown-up children, afraid that they will go mad, as did his wife. He then invites a doctor of dubious reputation to supervise their mental health and cure them of the unnatural attraction they have for each other. Meanwhile, in the vicinity of the mansion, murders are happening in the local village and a travelling priest arrives to help drive out any local demons.

== Cast ==
- Robert Hardy as Zorn
- Shane Briant as Emil
- Gillian Hills as Elizabeth
- Yvonne Mitchell as Hilda
- Paul Jones as Carl Richter
- Patrick Magee as Falkenberg
- Kenneth J. Warren as Klaus
- Michael Hordern as priest
- Robert Brown as Fischinger
- Virginia Wetherell as Inge
- Deirdre Costello as Magda
- Barry Stanton as Ernst
- Sidonie Bond as Zorn's wife
- Thomas Heathcote as coachman
- Sheila Raynor as old crone

== Production ==
Finance came from EMI Films.

The film's working title was Blood Will Have Blood. "Hammer thought there were too many bloods," said Wicking later. "I don't think anybody knew it was a quote from Shakespeare because they would have said no to that."

Producer Frank Godwin said " I wanted to retain my independence, and not be regarded as a Hammer 'stooge', it was agreed that the film would be a Hammer production in association with Frank Godwin Productions. This proved important because it enabled us to break all the Hammer rules, shooting a huge amount on location, even interiors.... Most of the casting, too, was not typical Hammer."

Principal photography took place from 16 August to September 1971. Much of it was shot in Bolney in Surrey, where a castle had been built by a German banker.

Peter Sykes was hired after Hammer were impressed by his work on Venom. The movie was based on the life of Franz Mesmer.

Wicking says "there was a sort of snobbery about" the film "which I think is a bad thing." He says Sykes wanted Paul Scofield and then Dirk Bogarde and when neither of them wanted to do it, Hammer felt they could not ask their usual leading men, Peter Cushing and Christopher Lee, and the role was given to Robert Hardy, which Wicking thought was a mistake. Frank Godwin said Eric Porter was going to star but Porter changed his mind after seeing a mock up poster of the film and deciding he no longer wished to do horror movies.

Sykes said the film was well reviewed and has become a cult film but was a commercial disappointment. "It wasn't a recognisable subject; there was no Frankenstein in it," said Sykes.

== Critical reception ==
The Monthly Film Bulletin wrote: "Demons of the Mind opens with a coach rattling through the forest and closes with torch-wielding villagers descending on the wicked Baron. But although it is made with style (Peter Sykes proves adept at recreating the oppressive atmosphere of Hammer's earlier films), the content is meagre, and unfortunately the days are past when a string of horror-film clichés (terrified coachmen, beautiful screamers, crimson rose) could stand in lieu of a plot. It may be a measure of the makers' intentions that the part played by Gillian Hills was originally meant for Marianne Faithfull (former pop idol Paul Jones still plays the male lead); but with the script providing few pointers, the three juveniles manage only shallow performances, while Michael Hordern and Patrick Magee plump for gross overplaying. The film's principal distinction is its violence, mostly gratuitous and, in the case of the climactic bloodbath, thoroughly unpleasant."

Time Out called the film "an exotic, Wildean horror story, visually as extravagant and tantalising as a decadent painting" that is "badly let down, though, by some grotesque overacting".

The Hammer Story: The Authorised History of Hammer Films wrote of the film: "oblique, ambitious and suffused with an air of primal dread, Demons of the Mind deserved better."

== Sources ==
- Hearn, Marcus; Barnes, Alan (September 2007). "Demons of the Mind". The Hammer Story: The Authorised History of Hammer Films (Limited ed.). Titan Books. ISBN 978-1-84576-185-1.
