= Tim Kelly (playwright) =

American dramatist (1931–1998)

- Born: October 2, 1931; Saugus, Massachusetts, U.S.
- Died: December 7, 1998 (aged 67); Los Angeles, California, U.S.
- Education: Emerson College; Yale University
- Occupation: Playwright

Tim Kelly (October 2, 1931 – December 7, 1998) was an American playwright who wrote over three hundred plays.

== Biography ==
Kelly was born in Saugus, Massachusetts on October 2, 1931. He graduated from Emerson College with a bachelor's degree and received a master's degree in play-writing from Yale University. His first stage play was Widow's Walk, published in the 1960s. Other early plays include A Darker Flower (New York's Pocket Theatre), The Trunk and All That Jazz (Boston's Image Theatre), and Die Blum (Germany). He wrote under a variation of his own name (Tim Kelly), and also at least four pseudonyms (Vera Morris, J. Moriarty, Robert Swift, Keith Jackson). His publishers include Samuel French, Pioneer Drama Service and Contemporary Drama Service.

He wrote over three hundred plays, which have been performed by the Royal Court Rep, the Studio Theatre, Manhattan Theatre Club, Los Angeles Actor's Theatre, the Aspen Playwright's Festival, and the Seattle Repertory Company. His professionally staged plays include Murder Game, described in a New York Times review of a 1989 production as a "tedious story with a contrived ending".

Kelly was a drama critic and journalist in Phoenix, Arizona (1965–1967) and was particularly noted for the broad scope of his work, which covered everything from mysteries to musicals to serious drama. He was also a screen and television writer (1968–1978).

In 1995, he became a member of the College of Fellows of the American Theatre.

On December 7, 1998, Kelly died suddenly at home of a brain hemorrhage (age 67).

== Awards and honors ==
Emerson College recognized him for his "contributions to the field of playwriting" on two occasions. The University of Wyoming's American Heritage Center holds a Tim Kelly Collection.
