= List of horror films of 1978 =

A list of horror films released in 1978.

Title	Director(s)	Cast	Country	Notes	Ref.
Are You in the House Alone?	Walter Grauman	Dennis Quaid, Blythe Danner, Alan Fudge	United States	Television film	
Attack of the Killer Tomatoes	John de Bello	David Miller, George Wilson, Sharon Taylor	United States		
The Bees	Alfredo Zacarías	John Saxon, John Carradine, Angel Tompkins	Mexico		
The Bermuda Triangle	René Cardona, Jr.	John Huston, Andrés García, Gloria Guida	Mexico		
Blue Sunshine	Jeff Lieberman	Zalman King, Robert Walden, Mark Goddard	United States		
Coma	Michael Crichton	Geneviève Bujold, Michael Douglas, Elizabeth Ashley	United States		
The Comeback	Pete Walker	Jack Jones, Pamela Stephenson, David F. Doyle	United Kingdom		
Damien – Omen II	Don Taylor	William Holden, Lee Grant, Jonathan Scott-Taylor	United States	Second film of The Omen franchise	
Dawn of the Dead	George A. Romero	David Emge, Ken Foree, Scott H. Reiniger, Gaylen Ross	Italy; United States		
Deathmoon	Bruce Kessler	Joe Penny, Barbara Trentham, Branscombe Richmond	United Kingdom; United States	Television film	
The Evil	Gus Trikonis	Richard Crenna, Joanna Pettet, Andrew Prine	United States		
Eyes of Laura Mars	Irvin Kershner	Faye Dunaway, Tommy Lee Jones	United States		
The Fury	Brian DePalma	Kirk Douglas, Amy Irving, Andrew Stevens, John Cassavetes, Daryl Hannah	United States		
The Grapes of Death	Jean Rollin	Marie-Georges Pascal, Serge Marquand, Felix Marten	France; Cameroon		
Halloween	John Carpenter	Donald Pleasence, Jamie Lee Curtis, Nick Castle, Nancy Kyes	United States	First film of Halloween franchise	
I Spit on Your Grave	Meir Zarchi	Camille Keaton, Eron Tabor, Richard Pace	United States		
The Initiation of Sarah	Robert Day	Shelley Winters, Talia Balsam, Morgan Brittany	United States		
Invasion of the Body Snatchers	Philip Kaufman	Donald Sutherland, Leonard Nimoy, Art Hindle	United States		
It Lives Again	Larry Cohen	Frederic Forrest, Kathleen Lloyd	United States		
Jaws 2	Jeannot Szwarc	Roy Scheider, Lorraine Gary, Murray Hamilton	United States	Second film of Jaws franchise	
Jennifer	Brice Mack	Lisa Pelikan, Bert Convy, Nina Foch, John Gavin	United States		
The Last House on the Beach	Franco Prosperi	Florinda Bolkan, Ray Lovelock, Sherry Buchanan	Italy		
The Legacy	Richard Marquand	Katharine Ross, Sam Elliott, Hildegarde Neil	United States; United Kingdom		
Long Weekend	Colin Eggleston	John Hargreaves, Briony Behets	Australia		
Magic	Richard Attenborough	Anthony Hopkins, Ann-Margret, Burgess Meredith	United States		
The Manitou	William Girdler	Tony Curtis, Michael Ansara, Susan Strasberg	United States		
Mardi Gras Massacre	Jack Weis	Curt Dawson, Gwen Arment, William Metzo	United States		
Martin	George A. Romero	John Amplas, Tom Savini, Elyane Nadeau	United States		
Mirrors	Noel Black	Kitty Winn, Peter Donat, William Swetland	United States	Alternative title(s): Marianne	
Nurse Sherri	Al Adamson	Geoffrey Land, Jill Jacobson, Marilyn Joi	United States	Alternative title(s): Beyond the Living; Black Voodoo; Hands of Death; Hospital of Terror; Killer's Curse; The Possession of Nurse Sherri	
Patrick	Richard Franklin	Susan Penhaligon, Robert Helpmann	Australia		
Piranha	Joe Dante	Bradford Dillman, Heather Menzies, Belinda Balaski	United States		
The Redeemer: Son of Satan	Constantine S. Gochis	T.G. Finkbinder, Jeanetta Arnette	United States	Alternative title(s): Class Reunion Massacre	
The Shout	Jerzy Skolimowski	Susannah York, Alan Bates, John Hurt	United Kingdom		
Someone's Watching Me!	John Carpenter	Lauren Hutton, David Birney, Adrienne Barbeau	United States	Television film	
Spawn of the Slithis	Stephen Traxler	Judy Motulsky, J.C. Claire, Mello Alexandria	United States	Alternative title(s): Slithis	
Stranger in Our House	Wes Craven	Linda Blair, Lee Purcell, Jeremy Slate	United States	Television film Alternative title(s): Summer of Fear	
The Swarm	Irwin Allen	Michael Caine, Katherine Ross, Henry Fonda, Olivia de Havilland, Patty Duke, Lee Grant	United States		
Terror	Norman J. Warren	Tricia Walsh, Sarah Keller, Glynis Barber	United Kingdom		
The Toolbox Murders	Dennis Donnelly	Cameron Mitchell, Tim Donnelly, Pamelyn Ferdin	United States		
Warlords of Atlantis	Kevin Connor	Doug McClure, Peter Gilmore, Shane Rimmer, Lea Brodie	United Kingdom		

== Sources ==
- Browning, John Edgar (2010). Dracula in Visual Media: Film, Television, Comic Book and Electronic Game Appearances, 1921–2010. McFarland. ISBN 978-0-7864-3365-0.
- Chibnall, Steve; Petley, Julian, eds. (2002). British Horror Cinema. New York City, New York: Routledge. ISBN 978-0-415-23003-2.
- Deal, David (2007). Television Fright Films of the 1970s. Jefferson, North Carolina: McFarland. ISBN 978-0-786-42929-5.
- Hardy, Phil, ed. (1995). The Overlook Film Encyclopedia. Vol. 3. Overlook Press. ISBN 0-87951-624-0.
- Hirschhorn, Clive (2000). The Universal Story. London, England: Hamlyn. ISBN 978-0-600-59736-0.
- Hutchings, Peter (2009). The A to Z of Horror Cinema. Lanham, Maryland: Scarecrow Press. ISBN 978-0-810-87050-5.
- Meyers, Ric (2011) [1983]. For One Week Only: The World of Exploitation Films. Guildford, Connecticut: Emery Books. ISBN 978-0-979-99893-5.
- Muir, John Kenneth (2007). Horror Films of the 1970s. Jefferson, North Carolina: McFarland. ISBN 978-0-786-49156-8.
- Rockoff, Adam (2002). Going to Pieces: The Rise and Fall of the Slasher Film, 1978-1986. Jefferson, North Carolina: McFarland. ISBN 978-0-7864-9192-6.
- Stine, Scott Aaron (2015). The Gorehound's Guide to Splatter Films of the 1960s and 1970s. Jefferson, North Carolina: McFarland. ISBN 978-0-786-49140-7.
- Thrower, Stephen (2007). Nightmare USA: The Untold Story of the Exploitation Independents. London, England: FAB Press. ISBN 978-1-903-25446-2.
- Young, R. G. (2000). The Encyclopedia of Fantastic Film: Ali Baba to Zombies. Hal Leonard Corporation. ISBN 1-55783-269-2.
