= Death Dimension =

1978 film by Al Adamson

- Theatrical poster for Death Dimension (1978)
- Directed by: Al Adamson
- Written by: Harry Hope
- Produced by: Gary Graver
- Starring: Jim Kelly; Harold Sakata; George Lazenby
- Cinematography: Gary Graver
- Edited by: Dan Seeger
- Music by: Chuck Ransdell
- Distributed by: Movietime
- Release date: July 1978
- Running time: 90 minutes
- Country: United States
- Language: English

Death Dimension (also known as Death Dimensions, Freeze Bomb, Icy Death, The Kill Factor, and Black Eliminator) is a 1978 American B-list action thriller and martial arts film by Al Adamson starring Jim Kelly, Harold Sakata, George Lazenby, Terry Moore, and Aldo Ray.

== Plot ==
A rogue scientist, Dr. Mason (T.E. Foreman), who invents a weather control device, is unknowingly being funded by gangster leader nicknamed "The Pig" (Sakata). Upon discovering that the Pig plans to use the device for blackmail instead of ending droughts as he had planned, Mason kills himself.

In order to prevent the secrets of the device from falling into the hands of the Pig, shortly before his death the scientist implants assistant Felicia's forehead (Patch Mackenzie) with a microchip containing the plans.

As the Pig is planning on selling the plans to the highest bidder he has her chased by his henchmen.

The local police chief, Captain Gallagher (Lazenby), gets put on the case and assigns an investigator, martial arts expert Detective Ash (Jim Kelly) to protect Felicia.

Pig's henchmen manage to kill Ash's girlfriend, however, Detective Ash manages to get Felicia to safety after an extended chase sequence.

== Cast ==
- Jim Kelly as Detective Ash
- Harold Sakata as Santo "The Pig" Massino
- George Lazenby as Captain Gallagher
- Terry Moore as Madam Marie
- Aldo Ray as Verde
- Bob Minor as Tatoupa
- Patch Mackenzie as Felicia
- April Sommers as Jackie

== Production ==
It was advertised as the one movie James Bond would go to see, featuring many actors with links to the Bond series, including George Lazenby and Harold Sakata. It was one of two movies that Adamson directed starring Jim Kelly, the other being Black Samurai.

== Reception ==
Creature Feature gave the movie one out of five stars, finding the story to be especially weak. Moria gave the movie two stars, noting that the science fiction elements are minimal, the title has little to do with the movie and the movie is more of an action film. It did find that this was one of the best of director's Al Adamson films. Film Critics United found much of the acting lacking and many of the action sequences lackluster, only recommended it for fans of Jim Kelly. Letterbox DVD gave the move 2.8 out of 5 stars.

== Home Release ==
Released on DVD in 2003 Also released as part of a box set of Al Adamson's movies
