= Psycho A-Go-Go =

1965 film by Al Adamson

- Mexican film poster
- Directed by: Al Adamson
- Screenplay by: Chris Martino; Mark Eden
- Story by: Al Adamson
- Produced by: Al Adamson
- Starring: Roy Morton; Tacey Robbins; Kirk Duncan; Tanya Maree; John Armond
- Cinematography: Vilmos Zsigmond
- Edited by: O'Dale Ireland
- Music by: Don McGinnis; Jimmie Roosa
- Production company: Tal Productions
- Distributed by: Hemisphere Pictures
- Release date: November 19, 1965 (Rochester, New York)
- Running time: 83 minutes
- Country: United States
- Language: English

Psycho A-Go-Go is a 1965 American crime thriller film directed and produced by Al Adamson. It follows a psychotic jewel thief (played by Roy Morton) who abducts a woman and her child to get back some stolen jewels hidden in the child's doll. The film is notable as an early credit for future Oscar-winning cinematographer Vilmos Zsigmond.

Adamson later extensively reused footage from Psycho A-Go-Go in his films The Fiend with the Electronic Brain (1969) and Blood of Ghastly Horror (1971).

== Plot ==
Joe Corey participates in a jewelry heist orchestrated by the crime boss Vito. They bind and gag the secretary and take the gems, but the secretary crawls to and pushes the alarm. One of the team, Travis, is shot by a security guard, and Joe finishes him off. With police closing in on the building, Joe tosses the stolen jewels off the side of the building into a pickup truck, intending for their getaway driver, Vicki, to retrieve them, but the truck's owner, Dave Clark, takes off before she can do so. Vicki gets his license plate number, and they break into the Registry of Motor Vehicles to look up his name and address. Vicki is officially Vito's girlfriend, but maintains a passionate secret affair with another of the thieves, Nick.

Dave's daughter Nancy finds the gems in the truck and hides them inside her doll. Nancy and her mother, Linda, set off on a trip to a national park on Lake Tahoe with the doll by bus. The thieves search Dave's truck and house, then beat him up after he denies knowing where the jewels are. Joe lures a worker at Linda's nightclub to a motel room where she tells him where Nancy and Linda went on their vacation, before murdering her for his own pleasure.

Joe and his mute accomplice Curtis abduct Nancy and Linda at the bus station at their point of arrival while Vito, Nick, and Vicki keep watch over Dave at his house. Linda's sister, Sherry, comes by and grows suspicious when Dave fails to answer the door. Sherry convinces her husband Frank, a police detective, to check it out. The thieves become more desperate as Joe and Curtis cannot find the jewels in Linda's luggage. Vito catches Nick and Vicki making out and decides to kill Nick, when Frank and his partner arrive. Nick throws a pillow to distract Vito, preventing him from killing Frank. In the ensuing skirmish, Vito drowns Frank's partner in the pool, and Nick shoots Vito dead.

Joe tries to rape Linda, but Curtis intervenes, and beats Joe senseless. Once Joe recovers consciousness, he shoots Curtis and pursues Nancy and Linda into the snow-covered wilderness. Dave and Frank follow them into the woods. Nancy accidentally drops her doll, and when Joe stops to pick it up, Frank shoots him. Joe plunges off a cliff. Nancy's doll, landing on the rocks beside him, sings as his life slips away.

== Cast ==
- Roy Morton as Joe Corey
- Tacey Robbins as Linda Clark
- Kirk Duncan as Dave Clark
- Tanya Maree as Vicki
- Lyle Felice as Vito
- John Armond as Nick
- K. K. Riddle as Nancy Clark
- Joey Benson as Police Lt. Frank Ward
- Shary Richards as Shelly Ward
- John Talbert as Curtis
- Al Adamson as Travis (uncredited)

The actress who plays the voice of the singing doll is credited as simply "Christy".

== Production ==
Originally titled Echo of Terror, the film was intended by Al Adamson as a vehicle for singer Tacey Robbins, whom he managed at the time. Scenes were shot at The Mutiny, a San Fernando Valley nightclub run by Adamson at the time. Adamson's father Victor was the film's production manager.

Psycho A-Go-Go was the first of several collaborations between Adamson and cinematographer Vilmos Zsigmond (billed under the anglicized 'William Zsigmond'). Zsigmond was brought to the attention of Adamson by actor Arch Hall Jr., who was impressed by his work on the 1963 film The Sadist. He took the opportunity because it allowed him to shoot in the Techniscope format, it was unusual for such a low-budget production to be filmed in both 35mm and in widescreen at the time. Adamson's longtime associate Sam Sherman noted, "[Zsigmond] made it look like a million bucks.... Even the distributors who turned it down were knocked out by the camerawork."

After the original cut failed to sell, Adamson recut and retitled the movie as Psycho A-Go-Go, hoping to play up the sexploitation angle.

== Release ==
As Psycho A-Go-Go, the film was initially distributed by Hemisphere Pictures. It premiered in Rochester, New York on November 19, 1965. It also had a theatrical run in Mexico under the title Rififi-A-Go-Go, and in the United Kingdom.

=== Re-tooled versions ===
In 1969, Psycho A-Go-Go was completely re-edited by Adamson, with additional footage featuring actor John Carradine as a mad scientist, and the film was re-released by American General as The Fiend with the Electronic Brain.

In 1971, Adamson shot yet more footage featuring actors Kent Taylor, Tommy Kirk and Regina Carrol, re-editing it as Blood of Ghastly Horror. This was theatrically distributed by Adamson's company Independent-International. This cut also later released to late-night television under yet another title, The Man With the Synthetic Brain, with the nightclub worker's murder scene excised.

== Home media ==
The Psycho A-Go-Go version was long considered lost, until it was released on DVD in 2004 by Troma Entertainment, with an introduction by Sam Sherman.

In June 2020, the film made its Blu-Ray debut by Severin Films, as part of their Al Adamson: The Masterpiece Collection.
