= Rosalind Miles =

Rosalind Miles may refer to:

- Rosalind Miles (actress) (1940-2022), American actress and fashion model
- Rosalind Miles (author) (born 1943), English author
