= Regina Carrol =

American actress (1943–1992)

- Born: Regina Carol Gelfan; May 2, 1943; Boston, Massachusetts, U.S.
- Died: November 4, 1992 (aged 49); St. George, Utah, U.S.
- Other name: Gina Adamson
- Occupations: Actress, singer
- Years active: 1959–1982

Regina Carrol (May 2, 1943 – November 4, 1992) was an American actor and singer, born Regina Carol Gelfan, mostly remembered for her roles in films directed by her husband, Al Adamson.

After several stage roles, she entered film through a family friend, Steve Cochran, who gave her a small role as a beatnik in The Beat Generation (1959). She met Adamson in a coffee shop in 1968 and appeared in several of his films.

Carrol died of cancer in St. George, Utah, on November 4, 1992. According to Adamson, "She went through a lot of pain at the end. There wasn't much I could do about it, just stay with her."

== Singing roles ==
- Dracula vs. Frankenstein (1971; "I Travel Light")
- Black Heat (1976; "No More Mail 'til Tomorrow")

== Filmography ==
Year	Title	Role	Notes
1959	The Beat Generation	Beatnik	Uncredited
1960	From the Terrace	Minor Role	Uncredited
1961	Two Rode Together	Wakanana	Uncredited
1964	Viva Las Vegas	Showgirl	Uncredited
1965	The Slender Thread	Minor Role	Uncredited
1966	The Glass Bottom Boat	Minor Role	Uncredited
1969	Satan's Sadists	Gina	
1971	Brain of Blood	Tracy	
1971	The Female Bunch	Libby	
1971	Dracula vs. Frankenstein	Judith Fontaine	
1972	Angels' Wild Women	Margo	
1972	Blood of Ghastly Horror	Susan Vanard	
1973	The Naughty Stewardesses	Plane Passenger with Little Dog	Uncredited
1974	Girls for Rent	Moll, Blonde sitting on Desk	Uncredited
1975	Jessi's Girls	Claire	
1975	Blazing Stewardesses	Lori Winters	
1976	Black Heat	Valerie	
1976	Black Samurai	Voodoo Dancer / Party Stripper	
1980	Carnival Magic	Kate	
1980	Doctor Dracula	Valerie	
