= Elvin Feltner =

American film producer

- Born: Clarence Elvin Feltner, Jr. August 29, 1929; Krypton, Kentucky
- Died: May 31, 2013 (aged 83); New York City
- Citizenship: American
- Occupations: Broadcaster, film producer, screenwriter, author.
- Years active: 1955–2013
- Known for: Telecommunications, film
- Notable work: Carnival Magic

Clarence Elvin Feltner Jr (August 29, 1929 – May 31, 2013) was an American film producer, television broadcaster and telecommunications entrepreneur. He was best known for producing the cult film Carnival Magic, for his role in a landmark copyright infringement decision v. Columbia Television, and as the owner of a significant private film collection.

== Career ==
Feltner's lengthy career in telecommunications and film began as an instructor at The RCA Institute For TV Production in New York City. He later founded Krypton International Corp, which owned/operated independent television stations in the southeastern United States. He spent decades amassing one of the larger known independent film collections in the world. "I've been buying up rights to films for 22 years," he told Inc Magazine in 1985. (The collection was recently "rescued" by the New York-based company Film Chest, according to a 2010 Boston Globe article.)

He served as Executive Producer of the 1964 film Teen-Age Strangler (aka Terror in the Night), and producer of the 1981 children's movie and cult favorite Carnival Magic.

He is the author of the self-help book Winning Is Everything, Losing is Nothing: For Nice Folks Who Want To Finish First, published in 1981 by Chelsea House.

He provided the seed capital for the RFD-TV Network, was a partner in Palm Beach Films, Inc, and is a former owner of the United States Basketball League team The Palm Beach Stingrays.

== Lawsuit ==
In 1991, Feltner was a defendant in a lawsuit v. Columbia Pictures Television, Inc, for copyright infringement. The case, which spent seven years in the courts and went as high as the Supreme Court, became notable for two reasons: 1) Feltner asserted that Columbia was not the exclusive licensee of the series in question at the time they filed the lawsuit (and therefore lacked standing under the Copyright Act); and 2) following the District Court's decision in favor of Columbia, Feltner appealed the decision, insisting that a jury should decide the amount of the damages assessed instead. Eventually, The Supreme Court reversed the District Court's decision, holding that the Seventh Amendment guaranteed Feltner the right to a jury trial "on all issues pertinent to an award of statutory damages under §§ 504(c) of the Copyright Act, including the amount itself."

The decision ultimately backfired on Feltner, however, as the jury awarded damages to Columbia in an amount that was almost four times greater than the initial award. In both cases, it was the largest statutory damages verdict in history.

== Recent activity ==
In 2010, Feltner was involved in the reissue of his film Carnival Magic, contributing bonus material, commentary and a rare sit-down interview. He also introduced the film at an art-house premiere in Austin, Texas, that same year. According to The New York Times, he is listed as being involved in producing a remake of Meet John Doe, but this is unverified.

He died May 31, 2013.
