= Someone's Watching Me! =

1978 television film directed by John Carpenter

- German VHS artwork
- Genre: Horror; thriller
- Written by: John Carpenter
- Directed by: John Carpenter
- Starring: Lauren Hutton; David Birney; Adrienne Barbeau
- Music by: Harry Sukman
- Country of origin: United States
- Original language: English

Production
- Executive producer: Richard Kobritz
- Production locations: Los Angeles, California, U.S.
- Cinematography: Robert B. Hauser
- Editor: Jerry Taylor
- Running time: 97 minutes
- Production company: Warner Bros. Television

Original release
- Network: NBC
- Release: November 29, 1978

Someone's Watching Me! is a 1978 American made-for-television thriller film written and directed by John Carpenter and starring Lauren Hutton, David Birney and Adrienne Barbeau. The film was made immediately prior to Carpenter's theatrical hit Halloween; it was produced by Warner Bros. and aired on NBC on November 29, 1978.

== Plot ==
Leigh Michaels relocates from New York City to Los Angeles, where she lands a job directing live television for a local station. Leigh rents a spacious apartment in a downtown high-rise building. She quickly befriends Sophie, a lesbian co-director with whom she will be working, and is aggressively pursued by Steve, a male director. During her first day on the job, Leigh receives an anonymous phone call from an unknown man. When she returns to her apartment, she finds the door unlocked, and presumes it was a worker who forgot to lock it after performing maintenance. Unbeknownst to Leigh, the man who phoned her at work— a stalker residing in a building across from hers— has infiltrated the apartment, and placed recording devices inside to monitor her.

One day, Leigh receives a letter from a company called "Excursions Unlimited," which informs her she has won a free vacation to Europe. At a bar, Leigh meets Paul Winkless, a philosophy professor at the University of Southern California, whom she finds herself attracted to. She subsequently begins receiving gifts in the mail, including a telescope and a swimsuit mailed to her anonymously.

Leigh begins to grow frightened as the anonymous calls continue, as well as unusual phenomena in her apartment, such as her lights dimming of their own accord. One night, she finds a letter slid under her door from someone claiming to be from Excursions Unlimited, there to discuss her vacation reward. Leigh is skeptical of the claim, and suspects the anonymous caller and other odd phenomenon is related to the purported "free vacation" notice. Armed with a knife, Leigh attempts to trail the person who left the letter, and ventures into the basement laundry room. Leigh accidentally drops the knife into a large floor drain; she removes the grate to retrieve the knife and hides beneath it when she hears someone walking down the hall. She watches from below as a man stands over the grate. Leigh crawls out of the drain when he leaves and flees back to her apartment.

In a subsequent phone call, the stalker comments on Leigh's appearance, leading her to realize the man resides in the building across from hers. She, Sophie, and Paul stake out in Leigh's apartment and attempt to identify the stalker by using the telescope to view the opposite apartments. A meeting with Gary Hunt, a police officer, is unfruitful as he informs Leigh that the man has not committed a crime. Back at Leigh's apartment, the stalker phones again, asking Leigh to look out the telescope; she sees the man she witnessed in the laundry room, apparently looking back at her through his telescope. Police subsequently arrest the man for harassment, though he denies any involvement, and he leaves California to return to his native Iowa.

Leigh is horrified when she receives another letter, and spots a different man spying on her from his balcony—she realizes the wrong man was caught. Armed with a walkie-talkie and a knife, Leigh goes to confront her stalker, communicating with Sophie, who watches from Leigh's apartment. When Leigh manages to enter the stalker's apartment, she witnesses Sophie being attacked in hers. She rushes back, but finds Sophie has vanished. Police find that Sophie had a flight to Fort Worth that night, and assume she left Los Angeles; they also explain to Leigh that the apartment she believes her stalker resides in is temporarily empty, as the resident is working abroad.

Alone in her apartment again, Leigh discovers a hidden microphone the stalker has used to surveil her. Through further investigation, Leigh and Paul learn that the apartment building's inspector, Herbert Stiles, also oversees and has access to numerous other buildings in the city. Suspecting Stiles may be the stalker, Leigh discovers his address and breaks into his house. There, she finds a number of microphones and other devices suggesting he has been the one bugging her apartment. After phoning Paul, Leigh returns to her apartment, but finds the lights out. On the coffee table is a typewritten suicide note signed with Leigh's name. In the dark, Leigh is suddenly attacked by Stiles, who attempts to throw her over the balcony, but she manages to stab him with a shard of glass before he falls over to his death.

== Cast ==
- Lauren Hutton as Leigh Michaels
- David Birney as Paul Winkless
- Adrienne Barbeau as Sophie
- Charles Cyphers as Gary Hunt
- Grainger Hines as Steve
- Len Lesser as Burly Man
- John Mahon as Frimsin
- James Murtaugh as Leone
- J. Jay Saunders as Police Inspector
- Michael Lawrence as TV Announcer
- George Skaff as Herbert Stiles
- Robert Phalen as Wayne
- Robert Snively as Groves
- Jean Le Bouvier as Waitress
- James McAlpine as Slick Man
- Edgar Justice as Charlie
- John Fox as Eddie

== Production ==
=== Development ===
Among fans, Someone's Watching Me! is often referred to as "the lost Carpenter film" due to its scarce availability on home video for many years.

It had the working title High Rise. Carpenter was hired by Warner Bros. in 1976 to write a feature script based on a true story about a woman in Chicago. He spent three months writing it and handed it in. Eight months later Warners contacted him saying they wanted to do it as a TV movie and offered Carpenter a chance to direct it.

"I thought it was a really, really good idea," said Carpenter. "So I had my first experience with television. And my first union experience. I got into the Director's Guild through that. I had a real good time on it, I have to tell you. I met my wife [Adrienne Barbeau]."

=== Shooting ===
The film was shot in eighteen days. "I had some control over it," said Carpenter. "I was able to shoot only what I wanted, I wouldn't cover it... I just gave them what I wanted and it got okayed."

Carpenter worked with Adrienne Barbeau, whom he married in 1979, for the first time when making Someone's Watching Me!. Barbeau later starred in The Fog (1980) and had a supporting role in Escape from New York (1981).

The television station Leigh Michaels gets a job at is named KJHC. The last three letters are a secret wink to the writer and director's full name: John Howard Carpenter.

Filming finished by April 1978. "I think it's the best thing I've done," said Hutton.

Carpenter says that two weeks later he started filming Halloween and many of the techniques in Halloween he devised on Someone's Watching Me. Carpenter later said he was "very proud" of the film even though it was not one of his better known works.

== Reception ==
NBC promoted Someone's Watching Me! as a "Tales of the Unexpected special," as to imply that the film was related to the 1977 NBC television series Quinn Martin's Tales of the Unexpected, but Quinn Martin Productions played no role in the making of the film, which was unrelated to the series.

=== Awards ===
Carpenter was nominated for the 1979 Edgar Award of Best Television Feature or Miniseries for the film.

== Home media ==
Scream Factory released the film on Blu-ray on August 7, 2018.

== See also ==
- List of American films of 1978
- List of horror films of 1978
