= Black Heat (film) =

1976 blaxploitation action film directed by Al Adamson

- Directed by: Al Adamson
- Produced by: Al Adamson; Calvin Floyd
- Starring: Timothy Brown; Jana Bellan; Russ Tamblyn; Geoffrey Land
- Edited by: Michael Bockman
- Music by: Paul Lewinson
- Release date: December 25, 1976
- Running time: 94 minutes
- Country: United States
- Language: English

Black Heat is a 1976 blaxploitation action film directed and produced by Al Adamson. The film stars Timothy Brown, Russ Tamblyn and Geoffrey Land. The film was renamed to Girl's Hotel for play at drive in theaters, then later changed to Murder Gang.

The plot is about a Las Vegas detective named "Kicks" Carter (Brown) who attempts to foil arms dealers selling weapons to Central America. At the same time, he seeks to save some women who are forced to work as prostitutes to pay off gambling debts.

== Plot ==
Kicks Carter is a streetwise policeman whose beat is Las Vegas. A crime gang is running guns, selling drugs, loan-sharking, and running a prostitution ring out of an upscale hotel in the city and Kicks is trying to put them out of business. But the interference of a woman reporter is making his job more difficult.

== Cast ==
- Timothy Brown as Kicks Carter
- Russ Tamblyn as "Ziggy"
- Jana Bellan as Terry
- Geoffrey Land as Tony
- Regina Carrol as Valerie
- Al Richardson as Alphonse
- Tanya Boyd as Stephanie
- Darlene Anders as Fay
