= Rosalind Miles (actress) =

American actress and model (1940–2022)

- Miles, c. 1970s.
- Born: Rosalind Beatrice Medlock; January 15, 1940; Houston, Texas, U.S.
- Died: February 8, 2022 (aged 82); Los Angeles, California, U.S.
- Education: I.M. Terrell High School
- Alma mater: B.A. Howard University
- Occupations: Actress; fashion model
- Years active: 1967–1982
- Known for: Arna Asby – Shaft's Big Score!
- Spouses: James W. Powell (m. 1963; div. 1966) Robert L. Miles (m. 1968; div. 1969) Todd A. Davis (m. 1979; died 2013)
- Partner(s): Jim Kelly (1973–1976)

Rosalind Miles (January 15, 1940 – February 8, 2022) was an American film and television actress and fashion model. Miles was most known for her roles in film during the early to late 1970s. Miles appeared in mostly American blaxploitation films such as; Shaft's Big Score!, The Black Six and Friday Foster.

== Biography ==
=== Early life ===
Miles was born Rosalind Beatrice Medlock in Houston, Texas.

=== Career ===
Miles moved to Los Angeles, California, to pursue her career in acting. Miles worked as a waitress in a local restaurant when she was discovered by a talent scout. In 1971, Miles made her film debut in Russel Vincent's How's Your Love Life? as Julie. Miles had several television appearances before her most notable role. In 1972, Miles played Arna Asby, the girlfriend of Shaft in the action film Shaft's Big Score!. After Shaft, Miles received a lead role as Erica in Al Adamson's 1974 crime film I Spit on Your Corpse (also known as Girls For Rent). Miles had roles in such films as The Black Six (1973), The Manhandlers (1974).

Miles appeared alongside Pam Grier as Cloris Boston, a fashion model, in 1975's blaxploitation film Friday Foster. In 1977, Miles auditioned for the role of Coretta Scott King for the NBC television mini-series based on the life of Dr. Martin Luther King, Jr. King, but the role was portrayed by Cicely Tyson. Miles last acting role was in Ernest Tidyman's To Kill A Cop in 1978. Miles was a part of the production of Guys and Dolls with her husband Todd Davis in 1981. Miles retired from acting in 1982.

== Personal life and death ==
Miles married three times and had no children. Her first marriage was to her high school sweetheart James W. Powell from August 28, 1963, to August 1966. From January 1968 until October 1969, Miles was married to Robert L. Miles then actor Todd Davis from March 1979 until his death in July 2013. Miles dated actor and martial artist Jim Kelly from 1973 to 1976. Miles died at her home in Los Angeles, California, on February 8, 2022, aged 82.

== Filmography ==
=== Film ===
Year	Title	Role	Notes
1971	How's Your Love Life?	Julie	
1972	Shaft's Big Score!	Arna Asby	
1973	The Black Six	Ceal	
1974	I Spit on Your Corpse	Erica	
1974	The Manhandlers	Mo	
1975	Attack on Terror: The FBI vs. the Ku Klux Klan	Rose Jackson	Television Movie
1975	The Turning Point of Jim Malloy	Bo-Peep	Television Movie
1975	Friday Foster	Cloris Boston	
1977	Benny and Barney: Las Vegas Undercover	Alice	Television Movie
1978	To Kill A Cop	Ida	Television Movie

=== Television ===
Year	Title	Role	Notes
1971–1972	Here's Lucy	Stewardess/Waitress	Episode: Lucy Helps David Frost Go Night-Night; Episode: The Case of the Reckless Wheelchair Driver
1972	Columbo	Nancy	Episode: Short Fuse
1976	Starsky and Hutch	Dorothy Nedloe	Episode: Bounty Hunter
1976	Baretta	Big Mama	Episode: Can't Win for Losin'
