= Marilyn Joi =

American actress (born 1945)

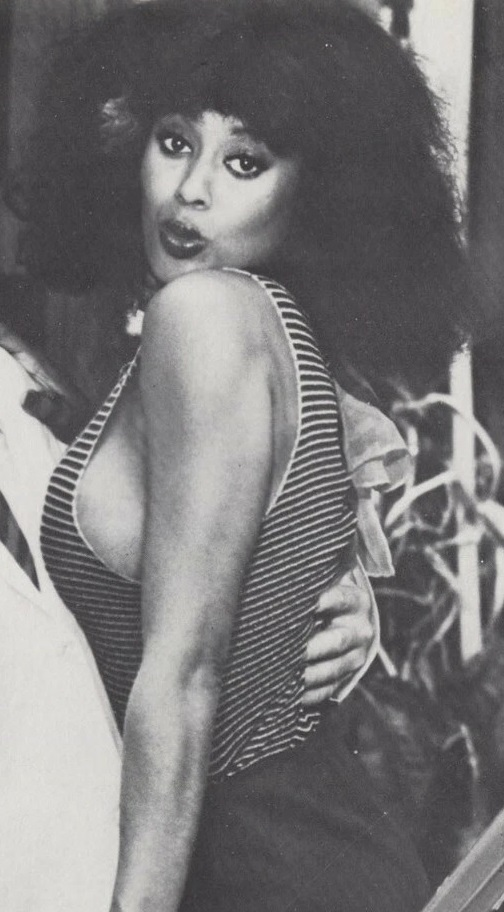
- Joi in The Happy Hooker Goes to Washington (1977)
- Born: May 22, 1945 (age 81); New Orleans, Louisiana, U.S.
- Other names: Tracy King, Tracy Ann King, T.A. King
- Occupation: Film actress
- Years active: 1972–1989

Marilyn Joi (born May 22, 1945) is an American retired actress who appeared in a number of exploitation films during the 1970s.

== Career ==
Joi starred in several films by Al Adamson including The Naughty Stewardesses (1974), Blazing Stewardesses (1975) and Black Samurai (1977), and played the henchwoman Velvet in Ilsa, Harem Keeper of the Oil Sheiks (1976), and Cleopatra Schwartz in The Kentucky Fried Movie (1977). Among her other film credits were roles in Hit Man (1972), Mean Mother (1974), The Candy Tangerine Man (1975), Mansion of the Doomed (1976), The Happy Hooker Goes to Washington (1977), Nurse Sherri (1978) and Galaxina (1980).

She was often credited as Tracy King, Tracy Ann King, and T.A. King.

== Filmography ==
=== Film ===
Year	Title	Role	Notes
1972	Hammer	Dancer	
1972	Hit Man	Rita Biggs	
1973	Mean Mother	Joy	
1973	Wonder Women	Black in Brown Bikini	
1973	The Student Teachers	Topless Dancer	
1973	Detroit 9000	Dancing hooker in whorehouse	Uncredited
1973	The Naughty Stewardesses	Barbara Watson	Credited as Tracy King
1973	Tender Loving Care	Lynn	
1974	Black Samson	Widow	
1974	Black Starlet	Kiss Girl	
1975	The Candy Tangerine Man	Clarisse	
1975	Blazing Stewardesses	Barbara Watson	
1976	Ilsa, Harem Keeper of the Oil Sheiks	Velvet	
1976	Mansion of the Doomed	Miss Matthews	
1976	Black Samurai	Synne	
1977	Uncle Tom's Cabin	Daughter	
1977	The Happy Hooker Goes to Washington	Sheila	
1977	The Kentucky Fried Movie	Cleopatra Schwartz	
1978	Nurse Sherri	Tara Williams	
1979	Cheerleaders' Wild Weekend	LaSalle	
1980	Galaxina	Winged Girl	
1981	C.O.D.	Debbie Winter	
1989	Satan's Princess	Hooker	

=== Television ===
Year	Title	Role	Notes
1976	Starsky & Hutch	Pepper / Charlie	2 episodes
1977	Good Times	Karen Casey	Episode: "J.J. in Business"
1977	Charlie's Angels	Brenda	Episode: "The Blue Angels"
1986	Hunter	Hooker	Episode: "The Beautiful & the Dead: Part 1"
1986	Hill Street Blues	Rhonda	Episode: "A Case of Klapp"
1987	Beverly Hills Buntz	Hooker	Episode: "Sid and Randy"
