= Mansion of the Doomed =

1976 American exploitation horror film by Michael Pataki

- Theatrical release poster
- Directed by: Michael Pataki
- Written by: Frank Ray Perilli
- Produced by: Charles Band
- Starring: Richard Basehart; Gloria Grahame
- Cinematography: Andrew Davis
- Music by: Robert O. Ragland
- Release date: October 1, 1976
- Running time: 85 minutes
- Country: United States
- Language: English

Mansion of the Doomed (U.K. theatrical title: The Terror of Dr. Chaney; also known as Massacre Mansion, Eyes, Eyes of Dr. Chaney and House of Blood) is a 1976 American exploitation horror film directed by Michael Pataki and starring Richard Basehart and Gloria Grahame.

While not prosecuted for obscenity, the film was seized and confiscated in the U.K. under Section 3 of the Obscene Publications Act 1959 during the video nasty panic.

== Plot ==
Nancy Chaney, the daughter of Los Angeles surgeon Leonard Chaney, loses her eyesight following a violent car accident. Leonard becomes determined to restore her eyesight, along with the help of his assistant, Katherine, first experimenting with the idea of an animal corneal transplant. He soon becomes obsessed with the idea of performing a full human eye transplant, despite Katherine's insistence that it would destroy Nancy's optic nerve.

Katherine drugs one of Leonard's ophthalmologist peers, Nancy's fiancé, Dr. Dan Bryan, so Leonard can harvest his eyes for Nancy. The surgery succeeds at first, but Nancy's blindness returns a few days later; meanwhile, Leonard keeps the now-eyeless Dan locked in an electrified cage in his basement.

Leonard continues to search for new potential eye "donors", picking up a hapless female hitchhiker on Sunset Boulevard, kidnapping her, and bringing her to his home to harvest her eyes and transplant them into Nancy. Another surgical failure, Leonard begins to interview women under the guise of them applying for a job as caregiver for his daughter. When his first interviewee states that she is married to a United States Marshal, Leonard informs her that he still has a few more candidates to interview and that he'd let her know. His second interviewee is an unmarried orphan who had only been in town for a couple of weeks, Leonard "hires" her and offers her a drugged glass of wine.

After this, he targets a real estate agent. As the transplants continue to fail, Leonard amasses a group of eyeless victims whom he keeps contained in a large holding cell in his basement. Katherine, horrified by the mounting situation, suggests he needs to get rid of the people in the basement—by killing them. Leonard refuses, stating he intends to help them.

Leonard next attempts to kidnap a young girl, promising to take her to Disneyland, but she manages to escape, jumping out of his car. As she escapes, Leonard accidentally hits another car, denting it. The dented car's occupants angrily drive after Leonard, following him to his mansion, where Leonard invites the two men in and offers them a thousand-dollar bribe for not going to the police. He then offers them some drugged wine.

Leonard's victims soon devise a way to break out of their cell, and two manage to escape from the house. One woman—the caregiver Leonard "hired"—is stopped by Leonard and Katherine, while another woman—the real estate agent—flees down the street, with Leonard in pursuit. She screams for help, but runs into traffic and is hit and killed by a motorist.

Detective Simon begins investigating the eyeless woman's death, and visits Leonard for his professional opinion on the state of the woman's body, specifically her lack of eyes. Leonard tells Simon that, though rare in younger people, the eyes may be removed for a number of reasons, ranging from syphilis to cancer. Leonard offers Simon some wine, but Simon, being on duty, declines.

After Simon leaves, Leonard enters the basement and promises his victims that he will restore their eyes once Nancy's surgery is successful. During this, Dan reaches through the bars of the cage and strangles Katherine to death. Leonard harvests the dead Katherine's eyes, transplanting them into Nancy, and buries Katherine on his property.

Miraculously, the transplanted Katherine's eyes more-or-less function, and Nancy awakens with her vision sufficiently restored. She stumbles downstairs, where she comes across her father's cage of "donors", and is horrified by what she sees. She subsequently pretends to be blind, leading her father to believe the surgery was another failure. Shortly after, Nancy frees her father's victims from their cell, and Al, one of the "donors", gouges out Leonard's eyes with his fingers as the rest of the captives flee from the doctor's home.

== Cast ==
- Richard Basehart as Dr. Leonard Chaney
- Gloria Grahame as Katherine
- Trish Stewart as Nancy Chaney
- Lance Henriksen as Dr. Dan Bryan
- Al Ferrara as Al
- JoJo D'Amore as Georgio
- Donna Andresen as Sylvia Porter
- Marilyn Joi as Miss Mathews
- Katherine Fitzpatrick as Elevator Victim
- Katherine Stewart as The Hitchhiker
- Vic Tayback as Detective Simon
- Simmy Bow as Ambulance Doctor
- Arthur Space as Wino

== Production ==
The horror film director John Hayes is credited as sound engineer.

== Reception ==
A review at Daily Dead, insisting on the prominence of the trope of the eyes in the film, states "Maybe watching Mansion of the Doomed (1976) you’d be content with a single case of eye transplant surgery instead of the six offered? Well, you’d be wrong. This is a film that leans heavy on the nihilism and nastiness of the times".
