= Donald Bruce Stewart =

American actor

- Don Stewart in Carnival Magic 1983
- Born: Donald Bruce Stewart; November 14, 1935; New York City, U.S.
- Died: January 9, 2006 (aged 70); Santa Barbara, California, U.S.
- Occupation: Actor
- Spouse: Susan Tremble (m. 1973; div. 1993)

Donald Bruce Stewart (November 14, 1935 – January 9, 2006) was an American actor best known for his long-running role as attorney Mike Bauer on Guiding Light. Stewart appeared on Guiding Light from 1968 to 1984, with a brief return appearance in 1997.

== Early life ==
Although born in New York, New York, Stewart spent his youth in Norfolk, Nebraska. He served six years as a pilot in the United States Air Force for which he was highly decorated. He later served in the U.S. Navy and U.S. Naval Reserve.

== Acting career ==
Stewart studied opera in New York City and landed a job as an understudy to Robert Goulet in the Broadway production of Camelot. After landing the role of Mike Bauer on Guiding Light, Stewart continued to perform in musical theater and nightclubs, including the 1964 production of Babes in the Wood. Prior to Guiding Light, he appeared on numerous episodes of the 1960s television series Dragnet.

After leaving Guiding Light, Stewart relocated to California, where he made guest appearances in a number of television series, including L.A. Law, Highway to Heaven, Beverly Hills: 90210, and Knots Landing. He also provided the voice of Clem in the 1991 film Rover Dangerfield. His final public appearance was in a 2001 episode of JAG.

== Death ==
Stewart died of lung cancer in Santa Barbara, California at age 70. He had previously been diagnosed with aplastic anemia of unknown cause, which limited his treatment options. He was survived by his two daughters, Dr. Heather-Michelle Stewart and Genevra Stewart.

== Filmography ==
Year	Title	Role	Notes
1942	Where Trails End	Donny Bedford	
1943	Wild Horse Stampede	Donny Wallace	
1944	Arizona Whirlwind	Donny Davis	
1965	The Virginian episode "The Letter of the Law"	Sheriff Lathrop	
1981	Carnival Magic	Markov	
1983	Lost	Jeff Morrison	
1985	American Ninja	Victor Ortega	
1990	Future Zone	Richards	
1991	Rover Dangerfield	Clem	Voice
1996	Listen	Reporter	
