= Celeste Perrault =

- Days of our Lives character
- Tanya Boyd as Celeste
- Portrayed by: Tanya Boyd (1994–2007); Beverly Todd (2012)
- Duration: 1994–2007, 2012
- First appearance: April 11, 1994
- Last appearance: June 29, 2012
- Created by: James E. Reilly
In-universe information
- Other names: Francesca Perrault; Frankie
- Occupation: Formerly worked for Alamain International; Formerly worked for Stefano DiMera
- Sisters: Grace Brooks
- Sons: Cameron Davis
- Daughters: Lexie Carver
- Grandsons: Theo Carver
- Nieces: Grace Jeffries

Celeste Perrault is a fictional character on the soap opera Days of Our Lives. The character is well known for her psychic abilities in the series. Celeste was portrayed by Tanya Boyd and Beverly Todd.

== Casting ==
Tanya Boyd portrayed Celeste from 1994 to October 2007. In 2012, it was originally confirmed that Boyd would reprise the role of Celeste later that year however, it was then confirmed that, due to scheduling conflicts, Beverly Todd would take over the role for a seven-to-ten episode arc. Todd debuted April 3, 2012. A first look at Todd's appearance on the drama was released on January 23, 2012, by Soap Opera Digest. Fellow actress Renée Jones (who plays her onscreen daughter) praised Boyd's appearance and has stated she is very happy to work with her.

== Storylines ==
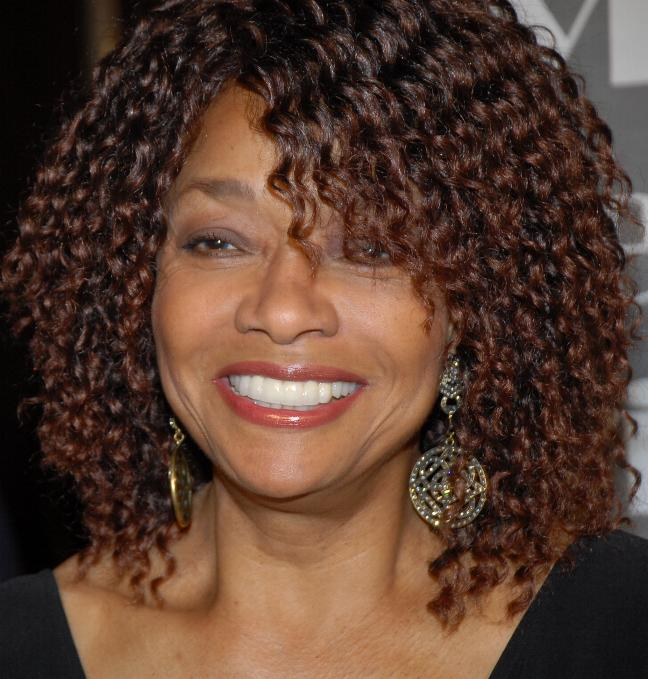
Beverly Todd (pictured) had taken over the role of Celeste in April 2012

Celeste was introduced in April 1994 as Stefano DiMera's confidante and former lover at the Maison Blanche plantation in New Orleans. Celeste is a Creole woman whose past is originally shrouded in secrecy. Later, it is revealed that she is Lexie Carver's "Aunt Frankie." In 1996, however, Lexie finds out that Celeste is her mother, and that she has been adopted by her "Aunt Frankie's" sister, Grace.

Taking a break from Salem, Celeste travels the world. During her travels she spends time in Tibet, becoming in tune with the spiritual world. It is here she hones her psychic powers and after premonitions of Lexie's health and happiness, Celeste returns to Salem. Celeste stands by helpless, as Lexie is consumed by her devotion to her son Isaac and her DiMera heritage.

Celeste tries to bring Lexie and her husband Abe back together, but her attempts seem futile as Abe wants no part of his DiMera wife. When Zack and Hope are kidnapped, Celeste believes her daughter has fallen far enough to be part of this ugly crime, however Lexie is not. Hope has been kidnapped by her former husband, Larry Welch.

Since then, Celeste has largely reformed and stayed out of Stefano's grip, but falls back from time to time due to her psychic abilities, and is very much in demand to help solve police cases. She is instrumental in predicting who the Salem Stalker victimizes in 2003 and 2004.

== Reception ==
In 2020, Candace Young and Charlie Mason from Soaps She Knows put Celeste on their list of Daytime's Most Important African-American Characters, commenting that "As a clairvoyant, Tanya Boyd's former character surely could have predicted that she was going to be included on this list. She wouldn't even have had to pull out the crystal ball, for Pete's sake."
