= Jim Kelly (martial artist) =

American athlete, actor, and martial artist (1946–2013)

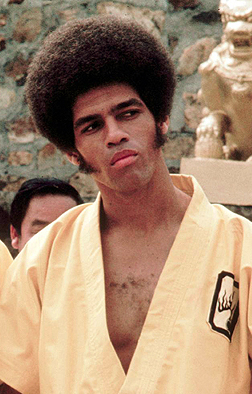
- Kelly in Enter the Dragon, 1973
- Born: James Milton Kelly; May 5, 1946; Paris, Kentucky, U.S.
- Died: June 29, 2013 (aged 67); San Diego, California, U.S.
- Education: Bourbon County High School; University of Louisville
- Occupations: Martial artist; actor; athlete; athletic instructor
- Years active: 1972–2013
- Spouses: Marilyn Dishman (m. 1967; div. 1968) Marcia Bentley (m. 1980–2013)
- Partner(s): Rosalind Miles (1973–1976)

James Milton Kelly (May 5, 1946 – June 29, 2013) was an American athlete, martial artist, actor, and professional tennis player. After winning several karate championships, he rose to fame in the early 1970s appearing in action films within the martial arts and blaxploitation genres. Kelly played opposite Bruce Lee in 1973's Enter the Dragon, and had lead roles in 1974's Black Belt Jones as the title character and Three the Hard Way as Mister Keyes.

== Early life and athletic career ==
Kelly's mother ran a locker rental service for Navy personnel. He began his athletic career at Bourbon County High School in Paris, Kentucky, competing in basketball, football, and track and field. He attended the University of Louisville on a football scholarship, but left during his freshman year after a coach called a Black teammate a racial slur. Kelly began to study Shorin-ryu karate.

Kelly began his martial arts career under the tutelage of Sin Kwang Thé (Shaolin-do) in Lexington, Kentucky. He trained in Okinawan karate under Parker Shelton, Nate Patton and Gordon Doversola. During the early 1970s, Kelly emerged as one of the world's most decorated karate champions. In 1971, he won four prestigious championships, most notably, the world middleweight title at the 1971 Long Beach International Karate Championships. Kelly opened his own studio, which was frequented by numerous Hollywood celebrities and ultimately landed him in the movies.

In addition to his martial arts and film careers, Kelly also tried professional tennis. He played amateur tennis in the 1970s at Plummer Park in West Hollywood. In 1975, he joined the USTA Senior Men's Circuit. He ultimately reached the No. 2 ranking in senior men's doubles in California and the top 10 in the state in senior men's singles. Later in life, he became the owner and director of a tennis club in the San Diego area.

== Acting career ==
Kelly was the first Black martial arts film star. His first role was a martial arts instructor in the thriller Melinda (1972). He got his part after being asked by the film's writer, to whom he was introduced by one of his students, to teach martial arts to its star, Calvin Lockhart. Kelly's breakout role was alongside Bruce Lee in the blockbuster, Enter the Dragon (1973). He played Williams, who is invited to a tournament run by crime lord and renegade Shaolin monk Han. The role was originally intended for actor Rockne Tarkington, who unexpectedly dropped out days before shooting in Hong Kong. Producer Fred Weintraub visited Kelly's studio in the Crenshaw district of Los Angeles after hearing about him, and was immediately impressed. That film gave him his most memorable lines:

Han (Shih Kien): We are all ready to win, just as we are born knowing only life. It is defeat that you must learn to prepare for.
Williams (Kelly): I don't waste my time with it. When it comes, I won't even notice.
Han: Oh? How so?
Williams: I'll be too busy looking good.

— Enter the Dragon

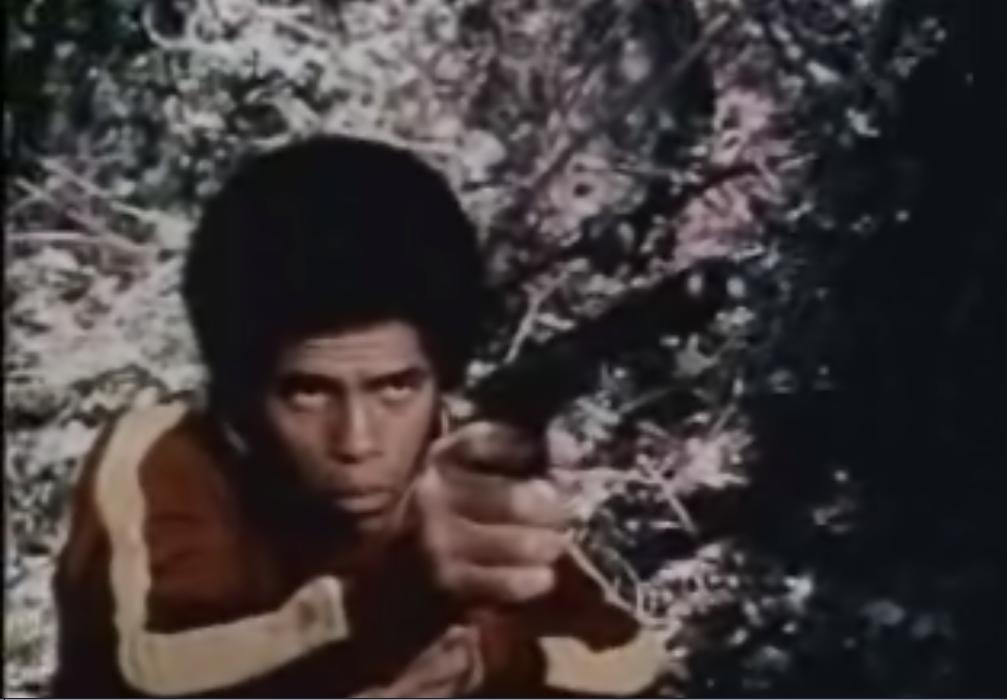
Kelly in Black Samurai (1977)

This appearance also earned Kelly a three-film contract with Warner Brothers and led to starring roles in a string of martial arts blaxploitation films. The first was Black Belt Jones (1974), in which he plays a hero who fights the Mafia and a drug dealer threatening his friend's studio. His other two Warner Brothers works were Golden Needles (1974), with Joe Don Baker and Elizabeth Ashley, and Hot Potato (1976), in which he reprises his role as Black Belt Jones and rescues a diplomat's daughter from the jungles of Thailand. He also made three films with black action heroes Jim Brown and Fred Williamson: Three the Hard Way (1974), in which he plays a martial artist who helps Brown and Williamson stop a plot to commit Black genocide, Take a Hard Ride (1975), a Spaghetti Western in which he plays a mute Native American scout skilled in martial arts, and One Down, Two to Go (1982), in which he plays a co-owner of an international martial arts studio. In the late 1970s, he also starred in the low-budget films Black Samurai (1977), Death Dimension (1978) and The Tattoo Connection (1978).

After his appearance in One Down, Two to Go, Kelly rarely appeared in movies though he did two episodes of the TV series, Highway to Heaven, in 1985 and 1986. A deleted scene from the film Undercover Brother (2002), included in the DVD extra features, shows him in a cameo appearance with Eddie Griffin. In his last film, Kelly made a cameo as Cleavon Washington in Afro Ninja (2009), produced, directed by and starring veteran stuntman Mark Hicks. In a 2010 interview with the Los Angeles Times, Kelly explained his absence from film:

I never left the movie business. It's just that after a certain point, I didn't get the type of projects that I wanted to do. I still get at least three scripts per year, but most of them don't put forth a positive image. There's nothing I really want to do, so I don't do it. If it happens, it happens, but if not, I'm happy with what I've accomplished.

— Jim Kelly

Film and television director and producer Reginald Hudlin described Kelly's enduring identity: "The iconography that Jim Kelly established as the cool martial artist with the giant 'fro resonates to this day. If within only a few films you can create an image that lasts over 30 years, you must have done something really right. And he did."

== Personal life and death ==
Kelly was married twice and had one child. From 1967 to 1968, he was married to his college sweetheart Marilyn Dishman. His second marriage was from 1980 until his death in 2013 to Marcia Bentley. From 1973 to 1976, Kelly dated actress Rosalind Miles.

On June 29, 2013, Kelly died of cancer at his home in San Diego, California. He was 67.

== Filmography ==
=== Film ===
- Melinda (1972) – Charles Atkins
- Enter the Dragon (1973) – Williams
- Location: Hong Kong with Enter the Dragon (1973) – Self
- Bruce Lee, the Man and the Legend (1973) – Self
- Black Belt Jones (1974) – Black Belt Jones
- Three the Hard Way (1974) – Mister Keyes
- Golden Needles (1974) – Jeff
- Take a Hard Ride (1975) – Kashtok
- Hot Potato (1976) – Jones
- Black Samurai (1977) – Robert Sand
- Death Dimension (1978) – Lt. Detective J. Ash
- The Tattoo Connection (a.k.a. Black Belt Jones 2) (1978) – Lucas
- Mr. No Legs (a.k.a. The Amazing Mr. No Legs) (1978)
- The Amazing Mr. No Legs (a.k.a. Mr. No Legs) (1979)
- One Down, Two to Go (1982) – Chuck
- Bruce Lee, the Legend (1984) – Self
- The Last Match (a.k.a. L'ultima meta) (1990)
- The Silent Force (1991)
- Powerplay (1992)
- Death by Misadventure: The Mysterious Life of Bruce Lee (1993) – Self
- Stranglehold (1994) – Executive #4
- Ultimatum (1994) – Executive
- Far East (1994) – Self
- Martial Arts Master: The Life of Bruce Lee (1994) – Self
- Bruce Lee: The Immortal Dragon (1994) – Self
- Top Fighter (1995) – Self
- Afros, Macks & Zodiacs (1995)
- The Way of the Little Dragon (1997) – Self
- Bruce Lee: In His Own Words (1998) – Self
- Bruce Lee: The Intercepting Fist (1999) – Self
- A Huey P. Newton Story (2001) – Self
- Bruce Lee and Kung Fu Mania (2001) – Self
- The Unbeatable Bruce Lee (2001) – Self
- BaadAsssss Cinema (2002) – Self
- Undercover Brother (2002) – Self
- Macked, Hammered, Slaughtered and Shafted (2004) – Self
- Ban the Sadist Videos! Part 2 (2006) – Self
- Afro Ninja (2009) – Cleavon Washington
- Adventure Scouts Honor (2010) – Mental patient
- Kashtok Speaks (2011) – Self
- I Am Bruce Lee (2012) – Self
- Birth of the Living Dead (2013) – Self(archive footage)
- They Love (2014) – Self(archive footage)
- Where I Belong (2017) – Self(archive footage)
- Karmic Justice (2019) – Self(archive footage)
- Blood & Flesh: The Reel Life & Ghastly Death of Al Adamson (2019) – Self(archive footage)
- Horror Noire: A History of Black Horror (2019) – Self(archive footage)

=== Television ===
- Highway to Heaven (1985–1986) – Reporter, station attendant (2 episodes)
