= Take a Hard Ride =

1975 film by Antonio Margheriti

- Theatrical release poster
- Directed by: Anthony M. Dawson
- Written by: Eric Bercovici; Jerrold L. Ludwig
- Produced by: Harry Bernsen
- Starring: Jim Brown; Lee Van Cleef; Fred Williamson; Catherine Spaak; Jim Kelly; Barry Sullivan; Harry Carey Jr. Robert Donner; Charles McGregor; Dana Andrews
- Cinematography: Riccardo Pallottini
- Edited by: Stanford C. Allen
- Music by: Jerry Goldsmith
- Production company: Bernsen-Ludwig-Bercovici Production
- Distributed by: 20th Century Fox
- Release date: October 29, 1975
- Running time: 103 minutes
- Countries: Italy; United States
- Language: English
- Budget: $2.3 million

Take a Hard Ride is a 1975 Italian-American Spaghetti Western film directed by Anthony Dawson and starring Jim Brown, Lee Van Cleef, Fred Williamson and Jim Kelly. This was the second of three films Brown, Williamson, and Kelly would star in, following Three the Hard Way and preceding One Down, Two to Go.

Pike, a stone-faced cowboy, meets up with Tyree, a dishonest gambler. The duo attempts to transport $86,000 across hundreds of miles of Western wasteland to deliver it to the widow of Pike's former employer Bob Morgan.

Co-financed by Italian and American producers, filming took place on location in the Canary Islands and Israel on a budget of $2.3 million.

On June 21, 2011, the film was released on DVD through Shout! Factory as part of a double feature with Rio Conchos (1964).

== Plot ==
Pike, the right-hand man of cattle rancher Bob Morgan, is entrusted with a mission to deliver $86,000 across the border to the Morgan Ranch in Sonora, Mexico after his boss dies. Pike teams up with dishonest gambler Tyree and they are forced to trust each other while being pursued by various outlaws and gunmen trying to possess the money, including the ruthless bounty hunter Kiefer and corrupt sheriff Kane.

Along the way, the duo comes across a prostitute Catherine in need of rescuing and Kashtok, a mute Indian scout skilled in martial arts, as well as Chico, an orphaned Mexican boy. After numerous gun battles and chases, Pike and Tyree reach the end of the line at an abandoned mine, where they duke it out over the money, yet finally settle and work together after getting word of the approaching gunmen.

Pike and Tyree give the money to Chico, then tell Kashtok to give safe passage to Chico and get the money safely to the ranch. Pike and Tyree devise a plan to escape by using explosives to blow up the mine shaft behind them, killing all their pursuers except for Kiefer, who decides to forgo his bounty and let the men continue their quest to reach the ranch.

== Cast ==
- Jim Brown as Pike
- Lee Van Cleef as Kiefer
- Fred Williamson as Tyree
- Catherine Spaak as Catherine
- Jim Kelly as Kashtok
- Dana Andrews as Bob Morgan
- Barry Sullivan as Kane
- Harry Carey Jr. as Dumper
- Robert Donner as Skave
- Charles McGregor as Cloyd
- Leonard Smith as Cangey
- Ronald Howard as Halsey
- Ricardo Palacios as Calvera
- Robin (Baker) Levitt as Chico
- Buddy Joe Hooker as Angel
