= The Female Bunch =

1969 film by Al Adamson

- Theatrical release poster
- Directed by: Al Adamson
- Written by: Jale Lockwood; Brent Nimrod; Raphael Nussbaum
- Produced by: Raphael Nussbaum; Mardi Rustam
- Starring: Russ Tamblyn; Jennifer Bishop; Lon Chaney Jr. Alesha Lee; Geoffrey Land; Regina Carrol
- Cinematography: Paul Glickman
- Edited by: Serge Goncharoff; Brent Nimrod
- Music by: Jaime Mendoza-Nava
- Production companies: Dalia Productions; Mardi Rustam Films
- Distributed by: Gilbreth
- Release date: September 1, 1971
- Running time: 86 minutes
- Country: United States
- Language: English

The Female Bunch is a 1969 action film directed by Al Adamson, and starring Russ Tamblyn and Lon Chaney Jr. The plot centered on a group of violent, man-hating female criminals who cause trouble near the Mexican border.

The Female Bunch was shot in the summer of 1969 at the Spahn Ranch during the time that it was occupied by the Manson Family. The film was distributed on DVD by Troma Entertainment.

== Plot ==
After a string of bad times with men, Sandy tries to kill herself. Co-waitress Libby saves her and takes her to meet some female friends of hers who live on a ranch in the desert. Grace, the leader of the gang, puts Sandy through her initiation and they get on with the real job of running drugs across the Mexican border, hassling poor farmers, taking any man they please, and generally raising a little hell. Soon Sandy becomes unsure if this is the life for her, but it may be too late to get out.

== Cast ==
- Russ Tamblyn as Bill
- Jennifer Bishop as Grace
- Lon Chaney Jr. as Monti
- Regina Carrol as Libby
- Nesa Renet as Sandy
- Megan Timothy as Pug

== Production ==
In addition to Spahn Ranch, parts of the film were shot in Hanksville and Capitol Reef in Utah as well as Las Vegas, Nevada. It was one of several films Tamblyn made with Adamson.

== See also ==
- List of American films of 1969
