= The Fiend with the Electronic Brain =

1969 Science fiction film

- Directed by: Al Adamson
- Starring: John Carradine; Roy Morton; Tacey Robbins
- Release date: 1969
- Language: English

The Fiend with the Electronic Brain was a 1969 low-budget science fiction film directed by Al Adamson and starring John Carradine. In 1971, this film was re-edited, with newly filmed footage added, into a very different version that was re-released to theaters as Blood of Ghastly Horror.

== Production ==
The Fiend with the Electronic Brain was re-edited from an earlier film Al Adamson directed in 1965 called Psycho A-Go-Go. Psycho A-Go-Go was originally a straight action thriller, about a psychotic young man named Joe Corey who participates in a diamond heist, but the stolen jewels wind up concealed in a child's doll. The little girl and her mother go off on holiday with the doll, and Corey pursues them into a forest to get back the loot. There were a number of musical nightclub scenes in the film, as director Al Adamson was trying to promote actress Tacey Robbins' singing career at the time.

Psycho A-Go-Go was re-edited, with some scenes removed and additional footage featuring actor John Carradine as a mad scientist added, and the film was re-released in 1969 as a science-fiction movie by American General titled The Fiend with the Electronic Brain. In this version, Joe Corey is an injured Vietnam War veteran who has become violently insane because a mad scientist named Dr. Vanard (John Carradine) has experimented on his brain. The incidents from Psycho A-Go-Go still occur in this version of the film (the jewel heist, the murders, etc.), but in this version of the film, Joe Corey's insane behavior is revealed to be the result of a mad scientist's experimentation on his brain.

Still not satisfied with the film, in 1971 Adamson added still more new footage featuring actors Kent Taylor, Tommy Kirk and Regina Carrol, and re-edited the whole thing into an entirely different film titled Blood of Ghastly Horror. This version was very successfully theatrically distributed for many years to drive-ins by Adamson's distribution company Independent-International, and was even sold to late night television retitled The Man with the Synthetic Brain.

== Plot ==
Joe Corey is an injured Vietnam War veteran who has become violently insane because a mad scientist named Dr. Vanard (John Carradine) experimented on his brain. The scientist had tried to fix the young man's shrapnel-injuries with electric shock therapy, but has turned him into a psycho instead. Corey at times becomes an uncontrollable beast. After he violently murders a cocktail waitress in a motel room, he goes in search of Dr. Vanard, seeking revenge for what the old scientist has done to him. In a mindless rage, Corey straps Dr. Vanard to his own lab equipment and electrocutes the mad scientist. Corey commits a jewel robbery, and then stalks a young woman and her little daughter into a forest when he thinks they have taken his stolen loot. A policeman shoots Corey as he is about to harm the two women, and he falls to his death from a cliff.

== Cast ==
- John Carradine - as Dr. Vanard
- Roy Morton - as Joe Corey, the psychopath
- Tacey Robbins
- K. K. Riddle
- Kirk Duncan
- John Talbert
- Lyle Felice
