= Dynamite Brothers =

1974 film by Al Adamson

- Directed by: Al Adamson
- Written by: John D'Amato (Writer), Marvin Lagunoff (Story), Jim Rein (Story)
- Produced by: Cirio H. Santiago
- Starring: Timothy Brown; Alan Tang; Aldo Ray; James Hong; Don Oliver; Carol Speed; Claire Nono; Lung Chan; Richard Lee-Sung; Ching-Ying Lam; Margo Hope
- Cinematography: R. Michael Stringer
- Music by: Charles Earland
- Release date: 1974
- Running time: Netherlands:96 min, US:90 min
- Country: United States
- Language: English

Dynamite Brothers, also known by its alternate title East Meets Watts, is a 1974 martial arts and blaxploitation film.

It was filmed on location in Watts, Los Angeles, and San Francisco. It stars football-hero-turned-actor Timothy Brown, who was also known for his role as Spearchucker Jones in the TV series M*A*S*H, and Hong Kong star actor and martial artist Alan Tang. It also stars Aldo Ray as a crooked cop and James Hong in a villainous role.

Current and future stars including Tony Liu, Biff Yeager, Phillip Ko, Billy Chan, Mars and Susan McIver of The Golddiggers fame pop up at various stages in the film.

== Plot ==
Larry Chin, a Chinese martial arts expert, sneaks into the United States at a San Francisco port, looking for his brother Wei Chin who disappeared several years prior, shortly after Larry's wife died in an accident. Larry is waylaid by men working for the crooked police officer Burke, who was told to watch for his arrival, but Larry is able to overwhelm the group and escapes. Larry convinces his cousin to tell him an address in Watts, Los Angeles where his brother had last been seen, unaware that his cousin has been warned not give that information and is later killed in a car bomb.

Larry is picked up by Burke while attempting to take a bus to Los Angeles, where he is handcuffed to Stud Brown. Stud creates a distraction to allow them to escape, and the two work their way to Los Angeles, with Larry explaining his situation to Stud and Betty Fon, a driver who helps them out. In Los Angeles, they arrive at the address which is a bar operated by the Smiling Man. They find that they are in the middle of a gang war between the Smiling Man and Razor, the latter looking to distribute illegal drugs into the city. When Stud and Larry save the Smiling Man's life, he recruits them to his cause and offers to help. While talking with the Smiling Man, Stud becomes attracted to the mute Sarah.

Betty has been looking into Wei's whereabouts for Larry, and directs him to Kung Fat, a local businessman. Kung tells Larry that Wei is dead and tells him the site of his gravestone, but when Larry goes there, he determines that Wei is not buried there. He goes back to Kung to accuse him of lying, but Kung and his men secure him, and attempt to take him to the outskirts of Los Angeles to be killed by a snake. Larry manages to escape and returns to Stud and the Smiling Man; the Smiling Man reveals that Kung is an agent in the drug ring, as well as Burke, who has been using his position to cover for the drug ring. When Larry returns to Kung's, he finds the man dead. Larry and Stud go to Burke, forcing him to reveal the location of the drug ring's mastermind. After they leave, Razor kills Burke for revealing this information.

Larry, Stud, and the Smiling Man plan an attack on the drug ring, when they learn Razor has been seen near Sarah's place. Larry and Stud arrive too late and find Sarah dead by Razor. Angered, the two begin the attack on the drug mastermind. Stud manages to kill Razor, while Larry meets with the mastermind, discovering he is really his brother Wei Chin; Wei was the one that accidentally killed Larry's wife and fled the country to avoid his brother. As Smiling Man's men attack Wei's base, Wei attempts to flee but Larry is able to catch up and cause him to drive his car off the road, killing him. Stud and the Smiling Man finish off the rest of Wei's and Razor's gang. After regrouping back at the Smiling Man's bar and making sure that they have taken over Razor's gang, Larry and Stud say their goodbyes as they are both still on the run from the law.

== Cast ==
- Timothy Brown as "Stud" Brown
- Alan Tang as Larry Chin
- Aldo Ray as Detective Burke
- James Hong as Wei Chin
- Don Oliver as Smiling Man
- Carol Speed as Sarah
- Claire Nono as Betty Fong
- Chan Lung as Tuen's Bodyguard
- Richard Lee-Sung as Kung Fat
- Lam Ching-ying as Tuen's Bodyguard
- Margo Hope as Chu Lin
- Mars as Tuen's Henchman (uncredited)
- Philip Kwok as Tuen's Henchman (uncredited)
- Tony Liu as Tuen's Henchman (uncredited)
- Philip Ko as Tuen's Henchman (uncredited)
- Billy Chan as Tuen's Henchman (uncredited)

== Soundtrack ==
The Dynamite Brothers

Soundtrack album by Charles Earland
- Released: 1974
- Recorded: November 1973; C.I. Recording, New York City
- Genre: Film score
- Label: Prestige; PR 10082
- Producer: Charles Earland

Charles Earland chronology
Charles III (1973)	The Dynamite Brothers (1974)	Leaving This Planet (1973)

The film score was composed and performed by organist Charles Earland and the soundtrack album was released on the Prestige label in 1974.

=== Reception ===
Professional ratings
Review scores
Source	Rating
Allmusic	2/5 stars

Allmusic awarded the album 2 stars, stating, "Although there were some soul-jazz elements in the score, it also reflected the move among many musicians from that background into funk, fusion, and rock territory in the early- to mid-'70s, particularly in the synthesizers... It often sounds like the kind of music you might have heard from a band warming up a crowd for a Miles Davis concert of the time. It's suitably slightly spaced soul/funk/fusion, atmospheric but not too heavy on remarkable compositional ideas."

=== Track listing ===
All compositions by Charles Earland

1. "Betty's Theme" - 5:01
2. "Never Ending Melody" - 5:19
3. "Grasshopper" - 2:47
4. "Shanty Blues" - 4:11
5. "Weedhopper" - 3:32
6. "Razor J." - 2:25
7. "Snake" - 8:37
8. "Kungfusion" - 3:41
9. "Incense of Essence" - 4:39

=== Personnel ===
- Charles Earland - organ, electric piano, synthesizer, soprano saxophone
- Jon Faddis, Eddie Henderson, Danny Moore, Victor Paz - trumpet
- Wayne Andre - trombone
- Dave Hubbard - soprano saxophone, tenor saxophone, alto flute
- Patrick Gleeson - synthesizer
- Cornell Dupree, Mark Elf, Keith Loving - guitar
- Melvin Bronson - electric bass
- Billy Hart - drums
- Darryl Washington - drums, timpani
- Larry Killian - percussion

== Video release ==
The film was released on DVD by BCI Eclipse on March 12, 2002. BCI was later shut down by its parent company, Navarre Corporation, and the DVD was discontinued.

Dynamite Brothers was featured on Cinematic Titanic's live tour as East Meets Watts, and video from the tour was released on DVD on December 16, 2009.

== See also ==
- List of American films of 1974
