= Carnival Magic (1983 film) =

1983 American film by Al Adamson

- DVD cover art
- Directed by: Al Adamson
- Produced by: Elvin Feltner
- Production companies: Krypton Productions; Araneo
- Release date: March 4, 1983
- Running time: 100 minutes
- Countries: United States; Belgium
- Language: English

Carnival Magic is a 1983 American children's film directed by Al Adamson and starring Don Stewart. It was produced by Krypton Productions.

Marketed as a family-oriented children’s film, it has since gained a cult following in underground and B movie film circles owing to its surreal plot and incongruously adult themes. Carnival Magic is Adamson's penultimate film.

It was picked up by another production company for an animated feature film in 2026.

== Plot ==
Stoney Martin runs a small town carnival and has recently hired a magician named Markov the Magnificent. After Markov gets into an argument with the carnival’s tiger-tamer Kirk, during which he hypnotizes Kirk’s dog into not barking at him, Kirk asks Stoney to fire Markov, and Stoney tells him he has to leave within a week.

Later that night, Stoney’s daughter Ellen “Bud” Martin finds out that Markov has an intelligent talking pet chimp named Alex that Markov is afraid to show to the world because he’s worried they won’t understand him. Bud convinces Markov to exhibit Alex and Markov shows him to Stoney, during which Stoney sees that Alex can comb his fur, brush his teeth, sweep floors, and pour glasses of orange juice.

Markov does a show with Alex, introducing him as “Alexander the Great”, and the audience sees that he can talk and do tricks. An anthropologist named Dr. Poole sinisterly lurks in the back of the audience watching the show. After the show, the carnival becomes more popular. Markov confides in Kirk’s wife Kim that his wife died and Alex is all he has left. Meanwhile, Alex steals a car with a girl in it (played by Missy O’Shea) and goes on a joyride. A police car chases him and crashes into a ditch, and Alex is eventually pulled over.

Markov tells the carnival’s PR man, David, that he was raised by Buddhist monks after his parents were killed by the Japanese in WW2. David tells Markov that he wants to go out with Bud, and Markov tells him to be patient because she is still becoming a woman. David asks Bud out and she agrees to go roller skating, however they randomly end up walking in the woods and David kisses her.

Dr. Poole visits Markov and asks if he can study Alex for 2 weeks, believing him to be the “missing link”. Markov refuses. Markov does another show in which we find out that Markov can communicate with Alex via telepathy. Markov also hypnotizes a man named Clarence into believing that his name is Gus and he can bend steel bars, and he bends a steel bar that he couldn’t bend when he wasn’t hypnotized.

Bud tells Stoney that she wants to be called “Ellen” instead of “Bud” so she can be more grown up, and Stoney confides in Markov that he’s worried Ellen might not love him anymore once she grows up. Ellen and David then talk to Stoney and tell him they’re engaged and will be getting married. Meanwhile, Kirk is attacked by one of his tigers and Markov hypnotizes the tiger into stopping. Kirk then kidnaps Alex and takes him to Dr. Poole.

Dr. Poole takes Alex to his Anthropological Institute and plans to vivisect him, but Alex steals the key to his chain and breaks free, and then starts fighting off the Institute staff by throwing things at them. Meanwhile, Kirk gets drunk and tells Kim that the institute will “do worse than hurt” Alex. A struggle ensues and he slaps her twice. In the movie commentary, the producer Elvin Feltner explains that Kirk could only slap her twice because if she was slapped more than twice they wouldn’t be able to have a “G” rating anymore.

Kim calls Stoney and tells him what happened, and Markov kicks his door in and makes him tell him where Alex has been taken. The carnival workers all get in their trucks and drive to the Institute. They knock out a guard and go to Alex’s room, but find out that Alex has chosen to commit suicide by drinking a bottle of poison so he wouldn’t get vivisected. Stoney punches Dr. Poole and Alex is rushed to the hospital, where he flatlines and dies.

Markov visits Alex in his hospital room and says he wishes he had died instead of Alex. Alex then comes back to life. We see another show at the carnival where Alex is performing with Markov, with David and his new wife Ellen watching.

== Cast ==
- Don Stewart as Markov the Magnificent
- Regina Carrol as Kate
- Jennifer Houlton as Ellen Martin
- Howard Segal as David Rossiter
- Joe Cirillo as Kirk Wilder
- Mark Weston as Stoney Martin
- Charles Reynolds as Dr. Poole
- Diane Kettering as Kim
- Missy O'Shea as Girl in Car

== Background ==
Principal photography took place for the film over the span of three weeks in July 1980 in Gaffney, South Carolina, during that city's South Carolina Peach Festival. Many of the scenes in Gaffney were shot at the peach festival's carnival, its parade, and in a second parade staged for the movie. Additional work for the film was done at the Earl Owensby Studios in Shelby, North Carolina.

Producer Elvin Feltner and director Al Adamson intended the film as family fare, aimed at children, and it was in fact given a G rating by the MPAA. However, the prevalence of adult themes (alcoholism, sex, abuse, violence) left many viewers confused. The film premiered at the Crosscreek Cinemas in Greenwood, South Carolina, on March 4, 1983, and was also shown in other theatres in the region beginning on that date. By November it had seen a wider release, and was (for example) being shown in New York City.

This was the last acting role for Regina Carrol, who was married to director Adamson and featured in several of his films. Philip Morris, a real-life ringmaster, magician, and costume maker, appears as a carnival barker. This was also one of Adamson’s last two films before retiring from the film industry and pursuing a career in real estate.

== Revival and re-release ==
For two decades Carnival Magic was considered a lost film, and no prints were known to exist. This changed in 2009, when a 35mm print was discovered in a warehouse, sparking a revival of interest among cult film aficionados. Following the discovery of this print, Carnival Magic was restored and re-mastered in 2010, receiving its television debut on Turner Classic Movies in October of that year, as part of their TCM Underground series. It saw a DVD release in early 2011 from Film Chest and HD Cinema Classics, reissued on Blu-ray and containing bonus material. The bonus material includes out-takes, trailers, audio commentary and interviews with cult film historian Joe Rubin and producer Elvin Feltner.

The film was featured in an episode of Mystery Science Theater 3000 as a part of the show's eleventh season, released on April 14, 2017 through Netflix.

== Target audience ==
Various commentators found the film was a "strange move" in Adamson's career and that although its targeted audience was allegedly children, the film was not actually produced for that purpose. In the words of one reviewer "the G-rated Carnival Magic is the most thematically adult 'kids' film I’ve ever seen".
