= Golden Needles =

1974 film by Robert Clouse

- US film poster
- Directed by: Robert Clouse
- Written by: S. Lee Pogostin; Sylvia Schneble
- Produced by: Fred Weintraub; Paul Heller
- Starring: Joe Don Baker; Elizabeth Ashley; Ann Sothern; Jim Kelly; Burgess Meredith; Roy Chiao
- Cinematography: Gilbert Hubbs
- Edited by: Michael Kahn
- Music by: Lalo Schifrin
- Production company: Sequoia Pictures
- Distributed by: American International Pictures
- Release date: July 17, 1974 (United States)
- Running time: 92 minutes
- Countries: United States; Hong Kong
- Language: English
- Budget: under $1 million
- Box office: HK$ 18.00 $1,000,000 (US, Canada)

Golden Needles (also released under the title The Chase for the Golden Needles) is a 1974 adventure film starring Joe Don Baker, Elizabeth Ashley, Ann Sothern, Jim Kelly, Burgess Meredith, and Roy Chiao. The film was directed by Robert Clouse and shot on location in Hong Kong.

== Plot ==
A legendary statue has seven gold needles inserted in it, and an adult man will become a sexual superman when the needles are placed in the same position in his body. A colorful group of characters is all in on the hunt for the mysterious statue.

== Cast ==
- Joe Don Baker as Dan
- Elizabeth Ashley as Felicity
- Ann Sothern as Fenzie
- Jim Kelly as Jeff
- Burgess Meredith as Winters
- Frances Shi Ming

== Soundtrack ==
The soundtrack, composed and conducted by Lalo Schifrin, was released on Music Box Records label (website).

== See also ==
- List of American films of 1974
