= Dracula vs. Frankenstein =

1971 film directed by Al Adamson

- Theatrical release poster
- Directed by: Al Adamson
- Written by: William Pugsley; Sam Sherman
- Produced by: Al Adamson; Sam Sherman; John Van Horne
- Starring: J. Carrol Naish; Lon Chaney Jr.; Anthony Eisley; Regina Carrol; Angelo Rossitto; Russ Tamblyn
- Cinematography: Gary Graver; Paul Glickman
- Edited by: Irwin Cadden
- Music by: William Lava
- Distributed by: Independent-International Pictures
- Release date: September 20, 1971 (Los Angeles)
- Running time: 91 minutes
- Country: United States
- Language: English

Dracula vs. Frankenstein, released in the UK as Blood of Frankenstein, is a 1971 American science fiction horror film directed and co-produced by Al Adamson. The film stars J. Carrol Naish as Dr. Durea, a descendant of Dr. Frankenstein who is working on a blood serum with his assistant Groton (Lon Chaney Jr.). The serum soon becomes sought after by Count Dracula (Zandor Vorkov), who hopes that it will grant him the ability to be exposed to sunlight without harm. Other members of the film's cast include Anthony Eisley, Regina Carrol, Angelo Rossitto, Jim Davis and Russ Tamblyn.

== Plot ==
Wheelchair-using mad scientist Dr. Durea, the last descendant of the original Dr. Frankenstein, works out of a secret laboratory hidden behind the Creature Emporium, a haunted house exhibit located on the boardwalk amusement park in Venice, California.

With the help of his mute, simple-minded assistant Groton, Durea murders young girls for experimentation in hopes of perfecting a blood serum. Durea hopes the serum will heal his paralyzed legs and cure Groton of his condition. A dwarf named Grazbo, the ticket taker at the Creature Emporium, assists Durea and Groton in their crimes.

Count Dracula comes to Durea, promising to help him revive Frankenstein's monster (which he has exhumed from its secret grave in nearby Oakmoor Cemetery) in return for Durea's serum, which he hopes will grant him the ability to go out in the sunlight, thus making him invincible.

The duo brings the monster back to life. Durea sends him and Dracula out to murder his old rival Dr. Beaumont, who both discredited him and crippled him in a laboratory fire.

Las Vegas showgirl Judith Fontaine arrives, looking for her missing sister Joanie who was last seen hanging out with a group of hippies led by Strange. After failing to get help from Sgt. Martin, Judith investigates on her own, attracting the attention of biker Rico and his gang. Rico slips her some LSD at a dive bar with the bartender's help. Judith, on a trip due to the drug, is taken by Strange and his girlfriend Samantha to aging fellow hippie Mike Howard. Mike agrees to help her find Joanie. Judith, Mike, Samantha, and Strange go to the Creature Emporium, which Joanie had been known to frequent. They ask Durea if he has seen her, but he denies it.

More girls turn up missing. The monster kills two police officers while trying to abduct a girl for Durea's experiments. Groton goes to the beach with an axe, kills Rico and his gang before they can rape Samantha, and takes her into Durea's laboratory.

Judith and Mike, who have fallen in love, go to the Emporium, discover the laboratory and confront Durea. He explains that the girls who were killed (including Joanie and Samantha, whom Judith finds preserved in glass-fronted boxes) were frightened before their deaths. This created a special enzyme in their blood, which is the main ingredient for his blood serum. He tells Judith that her fear upon seeing Mike's death will help him complete the serum.

Durea sends Groton and Grazbo after the couple. Grazbo falls through the laboratory's trap door and is killed by impaling himself on the ax he carried. Sgt. Martin and Strange arrive with the police. Groton is shot by Martin and falls to his death from the rooftop of the building. As he attempts to escape, Durea falls from his wheelchair into a guillotine displayed in the Emporium and is beheaded.

Dracula hypnotizes Judith and binds her with rope to a railing. He then confronts Mike, who shoves a lit car flare in the Monster's face, forcing him to briefly turn on Dracula in his pain. Mike unties Judith, and they run away, but Dracula blasts Mike with fire shot out from his ring, burning him to ashes.

Judith faints upon seeing Mike's death. She awakens to find herself bound to a chair in an abandoned and desecrated church in a forest area outside of Venice, where Dracula's coffin is hidden. Dracula is about to drink her blood and turn her into his vampire bride, but the Monster, who has fallen for her beauty, turns against Dracula. The Monster removes Dracula's ring from his finger and forces Dracula out into the surrounding forest. Dracula tears off the Monster's arms and head, but is caught in the sun's rays before he can make it back to his coffin and disintegrates into dust. Judith frees herself and sees Dracula's ashes. She picks up Dracula's ring at the church's door, but, after a flashback of all that has happened to her, drops it and flees in fear.

== Cast ==
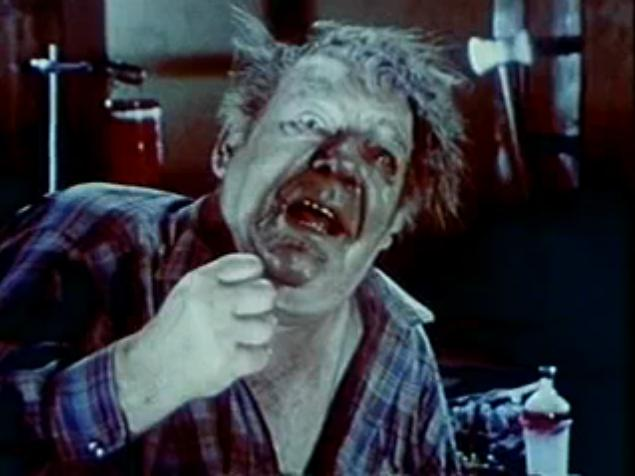
Lon Chaney Jr. as Groton

- J. Carrol Naish as Dr. Durea/Dr. Frankenstein
- Lon Chaney Jr. as Groton (called "the mad zombie" in the trailer)
- Anthony Eisley as Mike Howard
- Regina Carrol as Judith Fontaine
- Zandor Vorkov as Count Dracula
- John Bloom as the Frankenstein monster
- Jim Davis as Sergeant Martin
- Russ Tamblyn as Rico
- Anne Morrell as Samantha
- Maria Lease as Joanie Fontaine
- Angelo Rossitto as Grazbo
- Forrest J Ackerman as Dr. Beaumont
- Greydon Clark as Strange
- Shelly Weiss as the Frankenstein monster in the final scenes (listed as the "Creature" in the credits)
- Gary Graver as Mike's friend
- Sam Sherman as man killed by the monster
- Al Adamson as audience member
- Denver Dixon as extra

== Production ==
The film was developed under the titles The Blood Seekers and Blood Freaks. It was originally conceived as a follow-up to Satan's Sadists, an outlaw biker film also starring Russ Tamblyn that director Al Adamson and producer Sam Sherman had recently completed. The film was supposed to be another biker film, though with a horror angle. Paul Lukas was initially set to play the role that eventually went to J. Carrol Naish.

Principal photography began in March 1969 and ended one month later. To decorate Dr Durea's laboratory, the filmmakers rented props created by Kenneth Strickfaden for the 1931 film Frankenstein. The same props were later used by Mel Brooks for Young Frankenstein.

To accommodate the actor's schedules, shooting began before production elements were in place. Director Al Adamson had hired actors Lon Chaney Jr. and Naish sight unseen. Both actors were ill at the time of filming, with Chaney suffering from throat cancer and Naish from emphysema. It was the last film by both performers. When asked on Chaney's state during the film, Sherman recalled that Chaney had to lie down between takes. Chaney kept saying to fellow actor Denver Dixon, an old acquaintance of his, "You and I are the only two left... They're all gone... I want to die now. There's nothing left for me; I just want to die." Russ Tamblyn echoed these statements, saying that Chaney was drunk and he felt really sad for him at the time. Anthony Eisley also stated that Chaney had to lie down between takes and that he spoke with a whisper, leading to making the character mute.

After completing a rough cut of the film, Adamson and Sherman were dissatisfied with the result. Sherman later said that the film lacked "punch". As Lon Chaney Jr., and to a lesser extent J. Carrol Naish, had been involved with the Universal monster films, the filmmakers decided to make the horror aspects more prominent and to downplay the biker plot elements. Realising that there had never been a film called "Dracula vs Frankenstein", they opted to use that title. (Coincidentally, two Spanish films with similar titles were made in the same period). Dracula and Frankenstein's monster were added into the film while Naish's character, Dr. Durea, was turned into a direct descendant of Dr. Frankenstein. Part of the scenes that involved the biker gang led by Russ Tamblyn's character were deleted.

To play Dracula, Adamson and Sherman wished to hire John Carradine, who had already worked several times with them, but the actor proved too expensive. Roger Engel, a professional fundraiser with some acting background who had helped Adamson and Sherman meet potential investors, ended up being cast as Dracula under the stage name Zandor Vorkov.

Filming for the new scenes started in early 1971. Unlike Chaney, J. Carroll Naish was brought back to participate in the reshoots. After the final scene was deemed unsatisfactory, a new ending was conceived. Actor John Bloom, who played the Monster, was unavailable, so an acquaintance of Engel/Vorkov named Shelly Weiss was hired to play the character in the new finale.

== Reception ==
Lon Chaney Jr. biographer Don G. Smith stated that the film was "replete with problems" with Regina Carrol giving the worst performance of her career, and that the lighting of the final monster scene was inadequate. Smith called Vorkov "one of the worst Draculas in screen history".

== Home media ==
The film was first released on DVD by Troma Entertainment,

== See also ==
- List of American films of 1971
