= Blood of Ghastly Horror =

1971 American horror film

- DVD cover
- Directed by: Al Adamson
- Written by: Al Adamson; Mark Eden; Chris Martino; Dick Poston; Samuel M. Sherman
- Produced by: Al Adamson; Charles McMullen; Zoe Phillips; Samuel M. Sherman; J.P. Spohn; Don Geuss
- Starring: John Carradine; Kent Taylor; Tommy Kirk; Regina Carrol
- Cinematography: Louis Horvath; Vilmos Zsigmond
- Edited by: O'Dale Ireland
- Music by: Don McGinnis; Jimmie Roosa
- Distributed by: Troma Entertainment
- Release date: 1971
- Running time: 87 minutes
- Language: English

Blood of Ghastly Horror is a 1971 science fiction horror film directed by Al Adamson and starring John Carradine, Tommy Kirk, Kent Taylor, and Regina Carrol.

== Plot ==
Dr. Howard Vanard implants a strange electronic component into the brain of returning Vietnam War veteran Joe Corey, who becomes a psychotic killer. Joe takes part in a jewel heist with a few cohorts, and while escaping from the scene, the stolen loot is hastily thrown from a rooftop into the back of a pickup truck belonging to a guy named David Clarke. After he murders a cocktail waitress in a motel room and a secretary who is working late in an office, Joe goes in search of Dr. Vanard, seeking revenge. In a mindless rage, Joe straps Dr. Vanard to his lab equipment and electrocutes him. Joe and his friends then go to David's home and beat him up, trying to get him to tell them what happened to the stolen gems that were tossed into David's pickup truck, but they finally realize he knows nothing. Joe then follows David's wife, Linda, and his young daughter, Nancy, as they leave town on a trip, with the stolen jewels unknowingly concealed in Nancy's doll. Joe chases the two through a snow-covered forest before being shot by a pursuing policeman. He falls off a cliff, clutching the doll and the jewels as he dies.

Some years later, Susan Vanard, Howard's daughter, tells the police she has been getting psychic messages from someone in her sleep, speaking about Haiti and voodoo. Joe's father, a weird doctor named Elton Corey, has returned from Haiti, bringing with him a murderous zombie named Akro, and has set out to avenge Joe's death on anyone who was in any way involved with the late Dr. Vanard. Akro (who has only one eye) strangles a number of people in alleys, although his manner of choosing his victims seems to be totally random. Sgt. Cross investigates the recent spate of murders and feels they are related to the now-closed Joe Corey case. He questions Susan about her late father and his connection to what happened to Joe.

A police officer, Sgt. Grimaldi, is killed and mutilated in an alley by Akro, and his severed head is mailed in a box to a horrified Sgt. Cross. Susan is kidnapped by the zombie and taken to Elton's lab, where he injects her with a serum that ages people prematurely and turns them into zombies. Sgt. Cross finds Elton's lab. Akro turns on Elton when he overhears him say that Akro's body is wearing out and that he will be dead soon. He strangles Elton in a rage, and then dies when he can no longer obtain his life-preserving elixir. Susan drinks an antidote that returns her to her normal state.

== Cast ==
- Roy Morton as Joe Corey
- Kirk Duncan as David Clarke
- Tacey Robbins as Linda Clarke
- K.K Riddle as Nancy Clarke
- John Carradine as Dr. Howard Vanard

plus cast members added for the 1971 version only:

- Kent Taylor as Dr. Elton Corey
- Regina Carrol as Susan Vanard
- Tommy Kirk as Sergeant Cross
- Richard Smedley as Akro The Zombie
- Arne Warde as Sergeant Grimaldi
- Tanya Maree as Vicky
- Barney Gelfan (Regina Carrol's real-life father) as Police Detective

== Production ==
Blood of Ghastly Horror was re-edited from a film directed by Al Adamson in 1965 titled Psycho A-Go-Go. That film was a straight action thriller about a mentally disturbed man named Joe Corey who pulls off a diamond heist. The stolen jewels wind up hidden in a child's doll.

In 1969, Psycho A-Go-Go was totally re-edited, with additional footage featuring actor John Carradine as a mad scientist named Dr. Vanard added, and re-released by American General as The Fiend with the Electronic Brain. In that version, the Joe Corey character is a Vietnam War veteran who is mentally ill because Dr. Vanard experimented on his brain. Joe straps Dr. Vanard to his own equipment and electrocutes him.

In 1971 Adamson added more new footage featuring actors Kent Taylor, Tommy Kirk and Regina Carrol, and re-edited the whole thing into an entirely different (horror) film titled Blood of Ghastly Horror. This version was very successfully distributed by Adamson's company Independent-International. In this film, Kent Taylor plays Joe's father who, upon returning from a trip to Haiti, learns that his son's mind and life was destroyed by Dr. Vanard, and seeks revenge on anyone in any way associated with his son's death. With the help of a Haitian zombie named Akro, he kidnaps Vanard's daughter (Regina Carrol) and seeks to take out his revenge on her.

Sam Sherman later released it to U.S. late-night television as The Man With the Synthetic Brain (with a nightclub singer's murder excised). Most of the elaborate musical nightclub numbers that appeared in Psycho A-Go-Go were also cut from Blood of Ghastly Horror, since actress Tacey Robbins had retired from acting by 1971 and Adamson no longer had a need to promote her singing abilities. Actor Lyle Felice, who had played a major role in Psycho A-Go-Go (as the leader of the jewel thieves) is hardly even in Blood of Ghastly Horror at all, as the whole jewel heist plotline was drastically shortened. Dick Poston, a friend of Sam Sherman's who co-wrote the added material with him for Blood of Ghastly Horror, committed suicide several years later by purposely crashing the small plane he was flying in at the time.

Sam Sherman was asked if the title was overblown, to which he replied "It had blood.....it had horror....and it was certainly ghastly!" He said the film in its third incarnation was incredibly successful, and "played the drive-in circuit and late-night television for many, many years."

Mickey Mouse Club graduate Tommy Kirk appeared in the film for $1,000 for two days filming. He said he regards it as a low point of his career.
