= Blazing Stewardesses =

1975 film by Al Adamson

- Theatrical poster for Blazing Stewardesses (1975)
- Directed by: Al Adamson
- Written by: Samuel M. Sherman; John R. D'Amato
- Produced by: Samuel M. Sherman; Dan Q. Kennis (executive); Irwin Pizor (associate)
- Starring: Yvonne De Carlo; The Ritz Brothers; Don "Red" Barry; Bob Livingston
- Cinematography: Louis Horvath; Michael Ferris (assistant camera); Michael Mileham (assistant camera)
- Edited by: John Winfield
- Music by: Lee Zahler (stock music); Herman Stein
- Distributed by: Independent-International Pictures
- Release date: June 1975
- Running time: 95 minutes
- Country: United States
- Language: English

Blazing Stewardesses is a 1975 American sex comedy film directed by Al Adamson. Its title is derived from the 1975 film The Naughty Stewardesses and the 1974 film Blazing Saddles.

Producer Sam Sherman intended the film to be a fond throwback to "B" westerns of the 1940s, and hired a cast of screen veterans. He planned to reunite Yvonne De Carlo and Rod Cameron, who had co-starred at Universal Pictures in the 1940s, but Cameron walked out on the project after a salary dispute; Sherman replaced him with Don "Red" Barry. Joining Barry was another former cowboy star, Bob Livingston. For comedy scenes, Sherman hired The Three Stooges, but Larry Fine suffered a stroke that confined him to a wheelchair. Producer Sherman rewrote their scenes to accommodate Larry: Larry would be visiting a health spa, run by Stooges Moe Howard and Joe De Rita. Then Moe became too ill to perform, and had to withdraw. The Stooges were replaced by The Ritz Brothers, Harry and Jimmy, reprising many routines from their old movies. Location scenes were photographed at the White Sun Guest Ranch in Rancho Mirage, California.

There is some mild "T&A" content to justify the film's provocative title (DeCarlo's character runs an escort service) but nothing explicit. The film mostly resembles a vintage western, complete with dude ranch setting, outlaw hijackers, stunt riders, masked cowboy hero, and rodeo footage. To add more "B"-western flavor, producer Sherman used genuine background music of the 1940s, from the Lee Zahler library.

Because of the western theme, the working title The Jet Set was changed to Blazing Stewardesses to capitalize on the box-office hit Blazing Saddles. The film was later re-released under at least three alternate titles: Texas Layover, Cathouse Cowgirls, and The Great Truck Robbery.

== Plot ==
Ben Brewster owns the Lucky Dollar dude ranch; Honey Morgan trains young ladies to be escorts for the ranch's male guests. To revitalize the business, Brewster decides to install casino equipment and invites big-spending gamblers to the ranch. He charters a plane to take them there, and hires three stewardesses to staff the flight in return for a two-week vacation. The guests enjoy a barbecue, a costume parade, and a rodeo, but their vacation is disrupted by a band of hooded horsemen terrorizing the ranch and targeting Brewster. Also disrupting the scene are the Ritz Brothers, transients who sign on as hotel staff and become short-order cooks, golf instructors, janitors, and lifeguards. A mysterious masked hero arrives on horseback to rout the villains and unmask their leader.

== Cast ==
- Yvonne De Carlo – Honey Morgan
- Bob Livingston – Ben Brewster
- Don "Red" Barry – Mike Trask
- Harry Ritz – Harry
- Jimmy Ritz – Jimmy
- Geoffrey Land – Bob "Bobby" Travers
- Connie Hoffman – Debbie Stewart
- Regina Carrol – Lori Winters
- T. A. King – Barbara Watson
- Lon Bradshaw – Old Timer
- Jerry Mills – Pilot
- Nicolle Riddell – Jackie
- Sheldon Lee – Chuck
- Carol Bilger – Chuck's Girl
- Jon Shank – Sheik
- Leonard Geer – Plane Passenger
- Jack Tyree – Plane Passenger
- James Winburn – Plane Passenger
- Barney Gelfman – Plane Passenger
- Samuel M. Sherman – Gunfighter in Blue Shirt
- Patricia Comerford—Blonde in Pool

== See also ==
- List of American films of 1975
