= One Down, Two to Go =

- Directed by: Fred Williamson
- Written by: Fred Williamson
- Starring: Fred Williamson; Jim Brown; Richard Roundtree; Jim Kelly
- Music by: Herb Hetzer; Joe Trunzo
- Production company: Po' Boy Productions
- Release date: 11 November 1982
- Running time: 84 minutes
- Language: English
- Budget: $4 million
- Box office: $1 million

One Down, Two to Go is a 1982 American blaxploitation action drama film written and directed by Fred Williamson and starring Williamson, Jim Brown, Richard Roundtree and Jim Kelly. This is the third film to star Williamson, Brown, and Kelly, following Three the Hard Way and Take a Hard Ride. Williamson, Brown, and Roundtree would reunite nearly fifteen years later in Original Gangstas.

== Synopsis ==
Chuck Wells (Jim Kelly) and his partner Ralph Dart (Richard Roundtree) are the owners of the International Martial Arts dojo which is located in Los Angeles. A martial arts tournament is taking place with a prize of $400,000. Chuck and Ralph have their best student enter the event. The organizer of the event Frank Rossi. Rossi is in alliance with mobster Gabe Mario who has put up half of the prize money. Rossi tries to fix the tournament so that the outcome will be the way he wants it. Chuck becomes aware of this and Rossi learns that he is in the know. He sends his henchmen out who shoot Chuck in the chest. However the shooting isn't lethal. The efforts of the organizers to rig the tournament aren't successful and the student from the International Martial Arts dojo wins the tournament. The prize money is promised to Ralph the next morning but Mario goes back on his word. In amongst this, Chuck manages to get to an alley behind a tavern where his girlfriend Teri works. He tells her and her co-worker to let Ralph know about the shooting and to contact his two associates in California, Cal and J. Cal (Fred Williamson) and J (Jim Brown) are a couple of tough cops who go after the mob that jinxed the martial arts tournament Peter Dane plays Rossi and Victoria Hale plays his wife Maria. Mario is played by Tom Signorelli.

== Production ==
In order to make the fights look more authentic during the fictitious martial arts tournament in the opening of the film they are in fact real and not staged, the winner of each fight got paid $500 and the loser $100.

== Cast ==
- Fred Williamson as Cal
- Jim Brown as "J"
- Jim Kelly as Chuck
- Richard Roundtree as Ralph
- Paula Sills as Teri
- Laura Loftus as Sally
- Joe Spinell as Joe Spangler
- Tom Signorelli as Mario
- John Gruitz as Bob
- Richard Noyce as Hank
- Peter Dane as Ross
- Victoria Hale as Mrs. Rossi
- Warrington Winters as Sheriff Lucas
- Louis Neglia as Armando
- Aaron Banks as The Announcer

== Reception ==
The film opened November 11, 1982 at the Woods Theatre in Chicago. It had grossed over $1 million in its first month.
