= Baby Sister (film) =

- VHS cover
- Genre: Drama
- Written by: Jo Lynne Michael; Paul Haggard Jr. Susan Title
- Directed by: Steven Hilliard Stern
- Starring: Ted Wass; Phoebe Cates; Pamela Bellwood
- Music by: Fred Karlin
- Country of origin: United States
- Original language: English

Production
- Executive producer: Frank von Zerneck
- Cinematography: Isidore Mankofsky
- Editors: Mike Hill; Gregory Prange
- Running time: 100 minutes
- Production company: Moonlight Productions

Original release
- Network: ABC
- Release: March 6, 1983

Baby Sister is a 1983 American made-for-television drama film directed by Steven Hilliard Stern. The film, which stars Phoebe Cates, Ted Wass and Pamela Bellwood, centers on a 19-year-old woman who starts an affair with her older sister's boyfriend and premiered on ABC on March 6, 1983.

== Plot ==
Annie Burroughs is a wild 19-year-old who has just dropped out of college. Fearing to face her father, she packs her stuff and moves in with her older sister Marsha, who runs her own gallery in Los Angeles. Marsha is in a relationship with David Mitchell, a 31-year-old doctor who dreams of having his own private practice. Although they are very happy together, David isn't glad Marsha is spending so much time on work. Meanwhile, Annie immediately settles in the big city, landing a job as a receptionist at David's clinic. Although at first it is innocent and playful, Annie and David start flirting with each other.

A subplot focuses on the relationship between Annie and her father Tom. When she was still a child, Annie witnessed the death of her mother. She was crossing the street when a car suddenly drove toward her. Her mother, trying to save her, ran on the street and pushed Annie away, after which she was fatally hit by the car herself. Ever since, she and Tom do not get along well. Annie feels that her father blames her for her mother's death.

Annie once wanted to become a painter, just like her mother, but after her death she became isolated and gave up that dream. One night, David fails to save the life of his patient Billy, who has committed suicide. Annie witnesses his death and is reminded of her own mother. Both feeling very emotional, Annie and David end up kissing each other. The next day, Annie feels guilty, but David assures her it was only an innocent kiss. One night, Tom is throwing a family party. Annie gives him a self-made painting, but the style reminds him too much of her mother's, which upsets him. They end up getting into a fight, after which Annie leaves.

The next evening, Annie serves as a replacement for Marsha, who was supposed to attend a play with David, but wasn't able to make it. At first, they feel uncomfortable, but they end up having sex together. Although they both feel guilty, they can't suppress their sexual attraction and start an affair. He plans on telling Marsha the truth, but Annie discourages him from doing so, afraid to hurt her sister's feelings. Unable to face her sister anymore, she decides to return to college after attending Marsha's gallery opening.

David tries to prevent Annie from leaving, telling her he is in love with her. They kiss each other in the clinic, until he is suddenly attacked by one of his drug addicted clients. He ends up getting severely injured and Annie brings him to the hospital. The truth about the affair comes out when Marsha visits the hospital and is told by a nurse David's 'girlfriend' helped him to the hospital. Upon confronting her, Annie admits to being in love with him. David takes all the blame on him and advises Marsha not to turn her back on Annie. In the end, just before leaving L.A., Annie is reconciled with both Marsha and her father, the latter assuring her she is not responsible for her mother's death.

== Cast ==
- Phoebe Cates as Annie Burroughs
- Ted Wass as David Mitchell
- Pamela Bellwood as Marsha Burroughs
- Efrem Zimbalist Jr. as Tom Burroughs
- Virginia Kiser as Mrs. Strauss
- Jill Jacobson as Jessie
- Ed Lottimer as Buddy
- Ed Hooks as Counselor
- Ta-Tanisha as Night Nurse
- Thomas F. Duffy as Michael Fancher

== Production ==
The original title of the film was Tainted Love.
