= Tanya Boyd =

American actress

- Occupation: Actress
- Years active: 1975–2012

Tanya Boyd is an American actress who is best known for her role as Celeste Perrault on Days of Our Lives.

Boyd's early acting career included roles in the hit TV miniseries Roots (1977), and blaxploitation films such as Black Shampoo (1976) and Black Heat (1976).

Boyd performed by traveling the world as a back-up vocalist with such well-known artists as Anita Baker, Lou Rawls, Bobby Lyle and Natalie Cole. In 1979, she became a member of the vocal group The 5th Dimension, replacing Pat Bass.

== Acting Roles ==
- Days of Our Lives as Celeste Perrault (1994–1999 main, 1999–2007 recurring)
- For da Love of Money as Ms. Anderson (2002)
- The Good News as Joanne (two episodes, 1997)
- Under One Roof as Ava (1995)
- The Disappearance of Christina as Banker (1993)
- Tricks of the Trade (TV movie) as Beverly (1988)
- Jo Jo Dancer, Your Life Is Calling (1986) as Alicia (1986)
- The Twilight Zone as Melissa Parker (one episode, 1987)
- Wholly Moses! as Princess (1980)
- The Happy Hooker Goes Hollywood as Sylvie (1980)
- Murder Can Hurt You as Stunner (1980)
- Walking Through the Fire as Nurse Gales (1979)
- The Ted Knight Show as Philadelphia Phil Brown (six episodes, 1978)
- Good Times as Valerie Johnson (one episode, 1978)
- Roots as Genelva (1977)
- Black Heat as Stephanie (1976)
- Black Shampoo as Brenda St. John (1976)
- Ilsa, Harem Keeper of the Oil Sheiks as Satin (1976)

== Awards ==
- Drama-Logue Critics Award for Best Performance (Indigo Blues - 1993)
