= Timothy Brown (actor) =

American football player, singer, and actor (1937–2020)

Timmy Brown
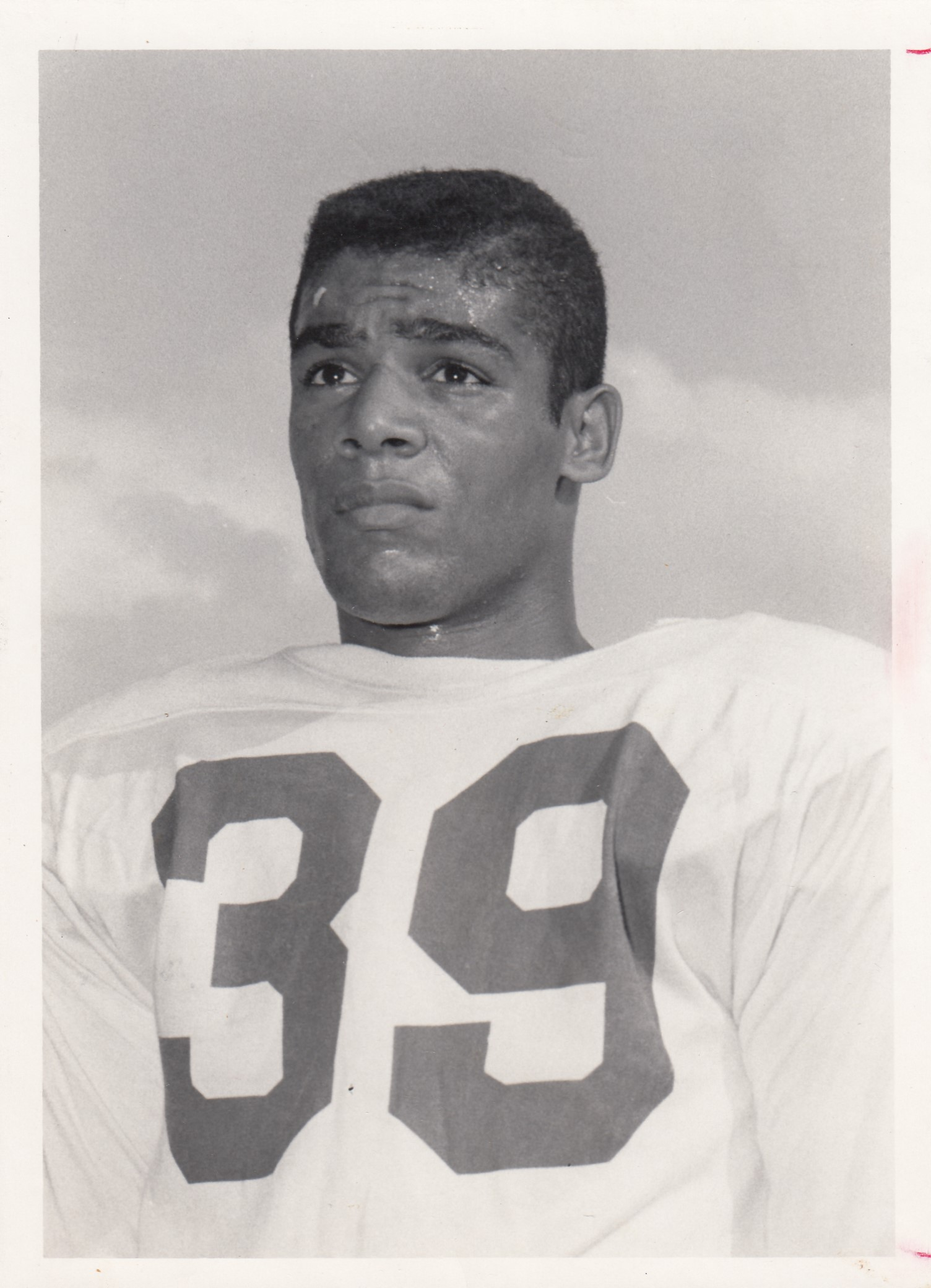
- Brown in Ball State uniform, 1958
- Born: Thomas Allen Brown; May 24, 1937; Richmond, Indiana, U.S.
- Died: April 4, 2020 (aged 82); Palm Springs, California, U.S.
- Other names: Timothy Brown; Tim Brown
- Occupations: football player; singer; actor
- Years active: Singer: 1962–2016; Actor: 1967–2000
- Known for: Playing career with the Philadelphia Eagles
- Football career

No. 25, 22, 2
- Positions: Running back, return specialist

Personal information
- Listed height: 5 ft 11 in (1.80 m)
- Listed weight: 198 lb (90 kg)

Career information
- High school: Indiana Soldiers' and Sailors' Children's Home (Knightstown, Indiana)
- College: Ball State
- NFL draft: 1959: 27th round, 313th overall pick

Career history
- Green Bay Packers (1959); Philadelphia Eagles (1960–1967); Baltimore Colts (1968)

Awards and highlights
- 2× NFL champion (1960, 1968); 3× Second-team All-Pro (1963, 1965, 1966); 3× Pro Bowl (1962, 1963, 1965); 2× NFL kickoff return yards leader (1961, 1963); Philadelphia Eagles 75th Anniversary Team; Philadelphia Eagles Hall of Fame; Ball State Athletics Hall of Fame; Indiana Football Hall of Fame

Career NFL statistics
- Rushing yards: 3,862
- Rushing average: 4.3
- Rushing touchdowns: 31
- Receptions: 235
- Receiving yards: 3,399
- Receptions: 26
- Return yards: 5,420
- Return touchdowns: 6
- Stats at Pro Football Reference

Thomas Allen Brown (May 24, 1937 – April 4, 2020), known also as Timothy Brown, Tim Brown, and most recognized as Timmy Brown, was an American actor, singer, and professional football player. He played in the National Football League (NFL) as a running back and return specialist.

== Early life ==
Born in Richmond, Indiana, Brown was raised in Knightstown, east of Indianapolis. Brown had six siblings, of whom he was the second-oldest. When he was eight years old, Brown's parents divorced, primarily due to his father's drinking habits and time spent away from home in the Army. From there, he bounced between homes until he settled into a boarding school with his brother, John Brown Jr.

Brown is a 1955 graduate of Morton Memorial High School at the Indiana Soldiers' and Sailors' Children's Home. At the Soldiers' and Sailors' Home, Brown excelled as a star athlete in football, basketball, and track. He received around 15 scholarships to play collegiate basketball, and only one football scholarship to play for Michigan State. However, he had no interest in playing anywhere except Ball State—at the time an NAIA-level program—and decided to walk on to play football.

== Football career ==
Brown played college football for the Ball State Cardinals. Although he had initially been recruited as a basketball player, he chose to play football instead. A personal feud with head coach Jim Freeman almost led to Brown quitting the team. However, he agreed to play as long as he would never have to speak with Freeman. Brown excelled as a star running back and returner for the Cardinals. In his senior season, Brown led the Indiana Collegiate Conference in rushing and scoring, finished second in punting, and was selected to the All-ICC first team and the All-America second team. For his collegiate career, Brown set six Cardinal records: best rushing average for a single game (20.5), most net yards in a single game (164), best rushing average in a season (10.0), most rushing attempts in a game (21), most rushing attempts in a season (112), and most points scored in a single game (25—a record that still stands today). He also earned a varsity letter in track, participating in his junior and senior years.

Brown was selected by the Green Bay Packers in the 27th round of the 1959 NFL draft. Brown feuded with head coach Vince Lombardi and struggled early in the preseason with dropped passes. Brown was cut by Green Bay following a week one 9–6 victory over the Chicago Bears in which he fumbled a snap whilst holding for a field goal.

Brown then signed with the Philadelphia Eagles, where he would play eight seasons as a returner and running back. In his first year, the Eagles won the 1960 NFL Championship Game over his former team in what would be Lombardi's only playoff loss. While playing for Philadelphia, Brown enlisted in the Army National Guard to make ends meet. Brown would have his greatest football moment on November 6, 1966, against the Dallas Cowboys, a 24–23 win in which he scored both a 90-yard and a 93-yard kickoff return (and almost a third if not for a trip-up with his teammate after a 21-yard return). He is the only Eagle (and the first of nine NFL players ever) to return two kickoffs for touchdowns in the same game.

The Cowboys-Eagles rivalry can have much of its nucleus attributed to a hit Brown took in the December 10, 1967, matchup. In the second half, Brown was hit in the face by Lee Roy Jordan chasing an overthrown pass. Brown lost three teeth, fractured his jaw, and broke a permanent bridge in his mouth. Jordan's hit, which Brown and his teammates claimed was both a late hit and an intentional elbow toward Brown's mouth, sidelined him for the remainder of the season.

After initially planning to retire, Brown would play one more season in 1968 for the Baltimore Colts. He scored the last touchdown in the 1968 NFL Championship Game and his final game was two weeks later in Super Bowl III with the Colts. He would finish with 80 return yards in the Colts' historic 16–7 loss to the New York Jets.

Brown went to the Pro Bowl in 1962, 1963, and 1965. He led the league twice in all-purpose yards, in 1962 and 1963 with 2,306 and 2,428 yards, respectively. He also led the league in kick returns and return yards twice, in 1961 and 1963.

He was inducted into the Philadelphia Eagles Hall of Fame in 1990. Then known as the Eagles Honor Roll, he was the only member to be inducted that year.

Brown also served as a color analyst for CBS NFL telecasts in 1973. In 1969, Brown was approached by Frank Gifford and Howard Cosell to be an on-air talent for ABC's Monday Night Football, but declined the offer to pursue his career in acting.

== Acting career ==
Brown used the name "Timothy Brown" as an actor to more clearly distinguish himself from Jim Brown, the Cleveland Browns running back who also became an actor.

Brown's acting career began while he was still an active player, with a guest appearance on the Season 3 premiere of The Wild Wild West as Clint Cartwheel in the episode titled "The Night of the Bubbling Death", which originally aired on September 8, 1967.

After retiring from the NFL, he became a full-time actor, appearing in such films as MASH (1970), Sweet Sugar (1972), Black Gunn (1972), Bonnie's Kids (1973), Girls Are for Loving (1973), Dynamite Brothers (1974), Nashville (1975), Zebra Force (1976), Black Heat (1976), Gus (1976) and Midnight Ride (1990). He also appeared in a half-dozen episodes of the first season of the M*A*S*H television series as Dr. Oliver Harmon "Spearchucker" Jones, but was dropped from the show. While it was reported that was due to the producers learning there were no African American surgeons serving in Korea during the Korean War, the producers said it was due to not feeling they could come up with meaningful stories involving that character when they were concentrating on writing stories about the characters Hawkeye and Trapper John. Along with Gary Burghoff, G. Wood, and Corey Fischer, he is one of only four actors who appeared in both the original MASH movie and the spin-off television series.

He made three guest appearances in the 1960s–1970s TV show Adam-12 and appeared in a Season 1 episode of The Mary Tyler Moore Show with opposite guest star and previous MASH co-star John Schuck. Both played retired NFL players vying for a job as a sportscaster.

== Music ==
=== 1950s and 60s ===
Brown began singing when he was attending Ball State. He performed in a band called 'Timmy Brown and the Thunderbirds'. His band included three white students at a time when interracial bands were quite rare.

In 1962, Brown recorded with Imperial Records (Travis Music Co. & Rittenhouse Music, Inc.) "I Got Nothin' But Time" and "Silly Rumors" while still in the NFL. The songs were written by N. Meade and V. McCoy and produced and arranged by Jerry Ragavoy.

In 1964, he headed a stage show at the Steel Pier in Atlantic City, New Jersey. When his part of the show came up, Brown, backed by a nine-piece orchestra, started with "What'd I Say. Other songs he performed were "Do You Want to Know a Secret", "This Land Is Your Land", and "I've Got a Secret". He made a guest appearance on I've Got a Secret, during which he sang a song of the same name.

=== 1970s ===
In addition to appearing in the 1975 film Nashville, his vocals appeared on the soundtrack.

=== Discography ===
Singles
Title	Release info	Year	Notes
"Gabba Gabba" / "I'm Gonna Prove Myself"	Marashel M-1002	1962	
"I Got Nothin' But Time" / "Silly Rumors"	Imperial 5898	1962	
"Do The Crossfire" / "Love, Love, Love"	Mercury 72175	1963	
"Runnin' Late" / "If I Loved You"	Mercury 72226	1963	
"I Got A Secret (Gonna Keep It To Myself)" / "Baby, It's Okay"	Ember E-1106	1964	

Various artist compilation appearances
Title	Release info	Year	Track(s)	Notes
Nashville, Original Motion Picture Soundtrack	ABC Records ABCD-893	1974	"Bluebird"	
Classic Soul Vol. 2	TOTO 2	1997	"Silly Rumors"	
Drummin' Up A Storm The Imperial Records Story	One Day Music DAY3CD022	2013	"Silly Rumors"	
Philly Boys of the 60s	That Philly Sound 5638263119	2014	"If I Loved You"	
The Imperial Records Story 1962	Real Gone Music RGMCD210	2016	"Silly Rumors"	

== Film ==
Title	Year	Role	Notes
MASH	1970	Cpl. Judson	
Sweet Sugar	1972	Mojo	
A Place Called Today	1972	Steve Smith	
Bonnie's Kids	1973	Digger	
Black Gunn	1972	Larry	
Girls Are for Loving	1973	Clay Bowers	
Dynamite Brothers	1974	Stud Brown	
Nashville	1975	Tommy Brown	
Zebra Force	1976	Lt. Johnson	
Black Heat	1976	Kicks	
Gus	1976	Calvin Barnes	
Pacific Inferno	1979	Zoe	
Porky 3	1983	Assistant coach	
Code Name Zebra	1987	Jim Bob Cougar	
Midnight Ride	1990	Jordan	
Life of a Woman	1993		
Frequency	2000	Roof Man Billy	(final film role)

== Later life ==
Brown became a father in 1987 with the birth of his first and only son, Sean. In later years, Brown worked as a correctional officer in Los Angeles. In the 2000s, he had retired and was residing in Palm Springs, California. Brown died on April 4, 2020, of complications from dementia at the age of 82.
