= Black Samurai =

- Theatrical poster
- Directed by: Al Adamson
- Written by: B. Readick
- Starring: Jim Kelly
- Cinematography: Louis Horvath
- Edited by: Jim Landis
- Release date: February 1977
- Running time: 88 minutes
- Country: United States
- Language: English

Black Samurai is a 1977 American blaxploitation martial arts spy action adventure film directed by Al Adamson and starring Jim Kelly. Produced by BJLJ International, with Executive Producer Laurence Joachim and screenplay credited to B. Readick, with additional story ideas from Marco Joachim. The film is based on a novel of the same name, by Marc Olden.

== Plot ==
Robert Sand, agent of D.R.A.G.O.N. (Defense Reserve Agency Guardian Of Nations), is on vacation when his commanding officers ask him to save a Japanese girl named Toki who is Sand's girlfriend, and the daughter of an Eastern Ambassador. The ransom for the abduction was the secret for a terrific new weapon - the freeze bomb - but the 'Warlock' behind the deed is also into the business of drug dealing and Voodoo ritual murders. The search takes Sand from Hong Kong to California through Miami, and plenty of action, against bad men, bad girls, and bad animals.

== Cast ==
- Jim Kelly as Robert Sand
- Bill Roy as Janicot
- Roberto Contreras as Chavez
- Marilyn Joi as Synne
- Essie Lin Chia as Toki Konuma
- Biff Yeager as Pines
- Charles Grant as "Bone"
- Jace Khan as Jace
- Erwin Fuller as Bodyguard
- Grace St. Esprit as Cleo
- Peter Dane as Farnsworth
- Felix Silla as Rheinhardt
- Cowboy Lang as Himself
- Little Tokyo as Himself
- Jerry Marin as Spiro "Shotgun Spiro"
- Alfonso Walters as Leopard Man
- Charles Walter Johnson as Leopard Man
- Regina Carrol as Voodoo Dancer / Party Guest (credited as Gina Adamson)
- Jesus Thillet as Martial Arts Fighter
- Cliff Bowen as Martial Arts Fighter
- D'Urville Martin (uncredited)
- Aldo Ray as DRAGON Chief (uncredited)

== See also ==
- Afro Samurai – Japanese manga series written and illustrated by Takashi Okazaki
- Yasuke – African samurai
