= Film Chest =

- Company type: Private
- Industry: Film, Home Video, Television
- Founded: New York, New York (2000)
- Headquarters: Bridgeport, Connecticut, United States
- Area served: North America, South America, Europe, Asia
- Key people: Ralph Stevens, Ian Stone (principals)
- Website: filmchestmediagroup.com

Film Chest, is a privately held media company that specializes in the archiving, restoring, licensing and distribution of films. It is headquartered in Bridgeport, Connecticut. Film Chest distributes consumer DVDs, and sells digital content via online outlets including Apple's iTunes Store, Amazon.com, and Hulu. It also licenses its movies to TV networks, including American Movie Classics and Turner Classic Movies, and for use as stock footage. According to the company's website, it services "high-quality content for use in broadcast television, film projects, video streaming, distribution, public television, cable or other professional needs."

== History ==
The company was founded in 2000 by partners Phil Hopkins and Ralph Stevens, and has since amassed one of the largest privately owned film libraries, containing approximately 2,000 film and TV titles. The titles comprise rare science-fiction, horror and action-adventure films (such as The Devil Bat), cartoons, and Oscar-winning classics like Orson Welles’ The Stranger, for which Film Chest completed the first-ever HD restoration. A recent Film Chest coup was finding the 1958 TV series “Decoy,” starring cult actress Beverly Garland, that few people had ever heard of because it was such a rarity. Despite its obscurity, the show was a landmark on two counts. It was the first series centered on a female cop and the first TV show to be shot on the streets of New York City.

In 2010, the company purchased a 45,000-foot warehouse in Bridgeport, Connecticut, where it plans to store and digitize film collections. The company recently added a public component to its work with a retail store, The Archive, which sells Film Chest videos and other carefully curated titles, as well as hundreds of vinyl record rarities and a screening room. The store also stocks posters, T-shirts and movie ephemera.

== Select titles ==
- The Bat
- The Brain That Wouldn't Die
- A Bucket of Blood
- Carnival Magic
- Decoy
- Dementia 13
- His Girl Friday
- Hollow Triumph
- House on Haunted Hill
- Kansas City Confidential
- Lancelot Link
- The Last Time I Saw Paris
- Metropolis
- Nosferatu
- One Step Beyond
- Sherlock Holmes – Murder At The Baskervilles
- The Stranger
- Three Stooges - Disorder In The Court
- Till the Clouds Roll By
