= The Naughty Stewardesses =

- Theatrical release poster
- Directed by: Al Adamson
- Written by: Bruce Feld, Samuel M. Sherman
- Cinematography: Gary Graver
- Edited by: John Winfield
- Music by: Herman Stein
- Distributed by: Independent-International Pictures
- Release date: January 1975
- Running time: 102 minutes
- Country: United States
- Language: English

The Naughty Stewardesses is a 1975 American sexploitation film directed by Al Adamson. The film, which partially inspired Adamson's Blazing Stewardesses released later the same year, is also known as Fresh Air.

== Premise ==
The plot revolves around the erotic adventures of four female flight attendants, who are flatmates on the American West Coast.

== Cast ==
- Robert Livingston - Ben Brewster
- Connie Hoffman - Debbie Stewart
- Richard Smedley - Cal
- Donna Desmond - Margie
- Marilyn Joi (credited as Tracy King) - Barbara Watson
- Sydney Jordan - Jane

== Production ==
The Naughty Stewardesses was considered a commercial success by the producers, who wanted to produce a sequel.

== Reception ==
The film was found to "follow the very pattern of Roger Corman nurse films (very popular at the time), only with stewardesses".

It "became an erotic cult classic."
