= I Spit on Your Corpse =

I Spit on your Corpse
- DVD cover
- Directed by: Al Adamson
- Written by: John D'Amato
- Produced by: Samuel M. Sherman
- Starring: Georgina Spelvin; Susan McIver; Rosalind Miles; Kent Taylor; Preston Pierce; Robert Livingston
- Cinematography: Gary Graver
- Edited by: John Winfield
- Distributed by: Troma Entertainment
- Release date: October 13, 1974
- Running time: 92 minutes
- Country: United States
- Language: English

I Spit on Your Corpse, also known as Fatal Pursuit and Girls for Rent, is a 1974 American crime film directed by cult director Al Adamson. Originally released on October 13, 1974, the film has been distributed on DVD by Troma Entertainment.

== Plot ==
Donna Taylor is a young prostitute recruited by a criminal organization known as "the Syndicate" to help blackmail their latest target, a politician. She agrees to carry out their plan of meeting him in his hotel room, drugging his drink, and having pictures taken of him while he is unconscious. She soon finds out the drug she administered was not a simple sedative as she had been told by Sandra and Erica, the two members of the Syndicate accompanying her, but a lethal poison. They threaten to kill Donna if she does not stay silent about the murder. After they depart to dispose of the body, Donna arranges to use a friend's place in Mexico to hide out. Unknown to her, the Syndicate is monitoring the hotel room.

The next morning, Donna drives off toward the US-Mexico border, unaware Sandra and Erica know her destination. Donna stops at a remote gas station to refuel and is approached by a young, female hitchhiker who urgently needs a ride. Donna declines, and while she is away from the car, the hitchhiker steals her car. Sandra and Erica pull into the gas station, and the attendant points them in the direction the hitchhiker left; they drive off immediately before he can tell them it had been stolen. Donna recognizes them, and now realizes she is being hunted.

Another customer, a young man named Chuck, has witnessed the series of events and offers to give Donna a ride. Suspicious of his motives, she declines, instead accepting a ride from a seemingly more trustworthy old man named H. R. Stringham. However, Stringham abducts Donna, taking her back to his remote desert home, where he demands Donna have sex with his mentally impaired son, Ben. Donna reluctantly agrees, and the two go off to a secluded area. As she begins to disrobe, it is evident the childlike Ben does not understand what to do. She sneaks back to the house and steals his pickup truck.

Meanwhile, the Syndicate girls overtake Donna's car, now driven by the hitchhiker, who explains that she stole the car at the gas station. Angered that Donna has eluded them, they kill the girl and return to the station. The attendant updates the two on Donna's whereabouts and gives them directions to Stringham's house. They pass Donna leaving in Stringham's pickup, but do not recognize her. Stringham's truck soon runs out of fuel, and while Donna is pondering her next move, a vehicle pulls up behind her. She arms herself with a pistol she finds in the glove compartment and waits. The driver turns out to be Chuck, who had been camping nearby when he noticed the stalled truck. He convinces her that the desert roads are impossible to navigate at night, and she returns to his camp until daybreak. Donna soon lets her guard down and tells her story to Chuck. At first, he is apprehensive about getting involved, but eventually agrees to help her escape. They have sex.

Sandra and Erica finally reach the old man's house, where he explains how Donna escaped. They decide to stay the night and resume hunting Donna in the morning. Sandra becomes drunk and seduces the dimwitted Ben. As he reaches orgasm, she pulls out her pistol and shoots him in the head, laughing. His father hears the noise and comes in, horrified and aghast. Sandra shoots and kills him as well.

The next morning, Donna and Chuck are driving down a desert road when Sandra and Erica pick up their trail and catch up to them. Chuck pulls over near an outcrop of hills and provides cover fire, while Donna tries to escape on foot. Chuck runs out of ammunition but ambushes Erica and, during a brief struggle, shoots her and takes her gun. Donna is chased by Sandra and finally killed. Sandra is quickly picked up by a car driven by the Syndicate boss, just as Chuck arrives and finds Donna's body. Bent on revenge, Chuck steals a dune buggy, chases them, and kills both Sandra and the driver.

== Cast ==
- Georgina Spelvin as Sandra
- Susie Ewing-McIver as Donna
- Rosalind Miles as Erica
- Preston Pierce as Chuck
- Kent Taylor as Moreno
- Robert Livingston as H. R.

== Production ==
Adamson said that the initial story involved drug smuggling in Mexico. It was eventually retooled into a chase picture to make it more theatrical.

== Release ==
The film was released theatrically as Girls for Rent. On home video, it was re-titled I Spit on Your Corpse. Troma Entertainment released the film on DVD in 2001.

== See also ==
- List of American films of 1974
