= Nurse Sherri =

1977 American supernatural horror film

- Theatrical release poster
- Directed by: Al Adamson
- Written by: Michael Bockman; Greg Tittinger
- Story by: Al Adamson; Samuel M. Sherman
- Produced by: Mark Sherwood
- Starring: Jill Jacobson; Geoffrey Land; Marilyn Joi
- Cinematography: Roger Michaels
- Edited by: Michael Bockman; Greg Tittinger
- Production company: Independent-International Pictures
- Distributed by: Independent-International Pictures
- Release date: March 1977
- Running time: 88 minutes
- Country: United States
- Language: English

Nurse Sherri (also known as The Possession of Nurse Sherri, Black Voodoo, Beyond the Living, Hospital of Terror, Killer's Curse, and Hands of Death) is a 1977 American supernatural horror film directed by Al Adamson and starring Jill Jacobson, Geoffrey Land, and Marilyn Joi. Produced and distributed by Independent-International Pictures, the film's plot follows a nurse who becomes possessed by the spirit of a vengeful cult leader who died in the hospital where she works.

== Synopsis ==
Sherri Martin is a hospital nurse. An evil spirit takes possession of her and forces her to murder her patients.

== Cast ==
- Geoffrey Land as Peter Desmond
- Jill Jacobson as Sherri Martin
- Marilyn Joi as Tara Williams
- Katherine Pass as Beth Dillon (as Mary Kay Pass)
- Prentiss Moulden as Marcus Washington
- Bill Roy as Reanhauer
- Erwin Fuller as Charlie
- J.C. Wells as Stevens
- Clay Foster as Dr. Nelson (as Clayton Foster)
- Caryl Briscoe as Nurse Gordon
- Jack Barnes as Dr. Andrews

== Reception ==
"Known over the years by a number of different titles in different parts of the world, Nurse Sherri is a seedy, low profile, drive-in circuit horror film from 1977. ", commented a review at Digital Bits.

== Home media ==
In 2017, the film was restored in 2K and released on DVD and Blu-ray by Vinegar Syndrome.
