= Jill Jacobson =

American actress (1954–2024)

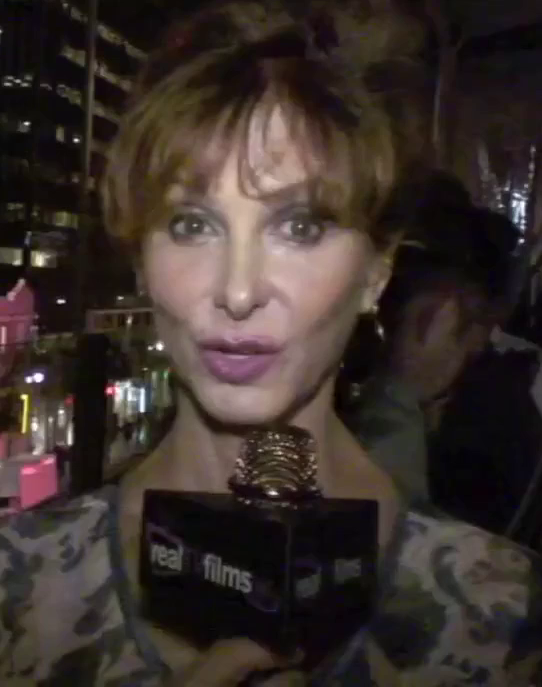
- Jacobson in 2012
- Born: May 21, 1954; Beaumont, Texas, U.S.
- Died: December 8, 2024 (aged 70); Culver City, California, U.S.
- Education: University of Texas at Austin (BS Radio-TV-Film/Performance)
- Occupation: Actress
- Years active: 1970s–2024
- Spouses: Paul Dorman (2001-2024)
- Website: jilljacobson.net

Jill Jacobson (May 21, 1954 – December 8, 2024) was an American actress of film, television, primetime soap opera, stage, and standup, best known for her television performances.

== Early life and education ==
Jill Jacobson was born on May 21, 1954, to a Jewish family in Beaumont, Texas. Her father was Harry Jacobson, a doctor, and her mother was Carol Toplitz Jacobson Hornstein. She grew up in Beaumont and Dallas.

Jacobson later attended The University of Texas at Austin, graduating with a Bachelor of Science degree in Radio, Television and Film/ Performance.

== Career ==
After graduation, Jacobson moved to Los Angeles to pursue an acting career. She started her career in the 1970s, portraying the titular character in Nurse Sherri in 1977.

Jacobson's credits include Days of Our Lives, Hung, Newhart, Castle, The New Gidget, Arliss, Party Down, Harper Valley PTA, The Devlin Connection, Crazy Like a Fox, Falcon Crest, Star Trek: The Next Generation, Quantum Leap, Who's the Boss?, Murphy Brown, Star Trek: Deep Space Nine, Splash, Bad Georgia Road, Forbidden Love, Baby Sister, Policewoman Centerfold, Not Just Another Affair, Ghost Whisperer, and The Fix. Her last appearance was in the series Etheria in 2020. She will appear posthumously on the TV show Merrily, set to be released in 2025.

In addition to acting, Jacobson also performed stand-up comedy routines and appeared on stage at The Improv in Los Angeles, The Comedy Store, and The Laugh Factory. She also worked as an executive producer, on The Circle and on the 2014 short Mic Whore, which she wrote.

For her work on the film Last Look, Jacobson was the recipient of the 2014 Scare-A-Con Film Festival Award in the Best Supporting Actress category.

== Personal life and death ==
In September 2024, several months before her death, Jacobson revealed that she had been suffering from esophageal cancer for more than two years, which "kind of took [her] out of the game for a while". She had previously volunteered as a national spokesperson for the American Cancer Society. She died after a long illness at a hospital in Culver City, California, on December 8, 2024, at the age of 70.

== Filmography ==
=== Film ===
| Year | Title | Role | Notes |
|---|---|---|---|
| 1977 | Nurse Sherri | Nurse Sherri Martin | Titular character, first role |
| 1977 | Bad Georgia Road | Sharlene | |
| 1979 | Up Yours | Lady Patient | |
| 1980 | Leo and Loree | | Minor role, uncredited |
| 1981 | Bulba | Holly Compton | |
| 1982 | Not Just Another Affair | Sophia Theodore | |
| 1982 | Forbidden Love | Roseanne | |
| 1983 | Baby Sister | Jessie | |
| 1983 | Policewoman Centerfold | Annie | |
| 1983 | An Uncommon Love | Marlene | |
| 1984 | Splash | Jill - Girl in Bar | |
| 1984 | Obsessive Love | DeeDee | |
| 1986 | 3:15 | | Credited as "Co-Star" |
| 1988 | Perfect Victims | Linda | |
| 1989 | The Jigsaw Murders | Dr. Louise Lester | |
| 1989 | Man Against the Mob: The Chinatown Murders | Verla | Sequel to Man Against the Mob |
| 1992 | Breaking the Silence | | |
| 1998 | Restless Souls | Amanda King | |
| 2001 | After the Storm | Governor's Wife | |
| 2001 | Instinct to Kill | Arlene | |
| 2005 | Fixed | Mary | |
| 2005 | The Circle | Mom | Executive producer |
| 2006 | Sideliners | Judge #2 | |
| 2008 | House of Usher | Dr. Cabot | |
| 2008 | Front of the Class | Aged Aunt | |
| 2010 | Welcome Home | Barbara | Short film |
| 2010 | Watch Out for Slick | Juliet Rousseau | |
| 2011 | The Back-up Bride | Aunt Peggy Sue | |
| 2011 | Cats Dancing on Jupiter | Mrs. Katz | |
| 2012 | The Perfect Marriage | Wife | Short film |
| 2013 | Hotel Vernonia | Hotel Clerk | Short film |
| 2014 | Mic Whore | Mic Whore | Titular character, writer and executive producer |
| 2014 | Last Look | Barbara | Short film |
| 2014 | You Me & Her | Bartender | Short film |
| 2014 | Pecoima Can Wait | Betty Wiffle | Short film |
| 2015 | The Stone Boy | Marina's Mother | Voice |
| 2015 | Excess Flesh | Beverly | |
| 2015 | Boredom | Jill | Short film |
| 2017 | Visage | Susan | |
| 2017 | Nurses Confessions | Self | |
| 2018 | Best Performance | Barbara | |
| 2019 | Sad Girl: Chlorine | Chlorine's Mom | Short film |
| 2020 | Reality Queen! | Lucy Logo | |

=== Television ===
| Year | Title | Role | Notes |
|---|---|---|---|
| 1982 | Harper Valley P.T.A. | Twin Carbs | 1 episode |
| 1982 | The Devlin Connection | Gina | 1 episode |
| 1984 | I Gave at the Office | | 1 episode |
| 1985–1987 | Falcon Crest | Erin Jones | 22 episodes |
| 1986 | Crazy Like a Fox | Terry - Fontana's Secretary | 1 episode |
| 1986–1987 | The New Gidget | Larue Wilson/Larue | 8 episodes |
| 1988 | Sledge Hammer! | Sally Vincent | 1 episode |
| 1988 | My Sister Sam | Sybil | 1 episode |
| 1989 | Star Trek: The Next Generation | Vanessa | Episode: "The Royale" |
| 1989 | War of the Worlds | Envoy | 1 episode |
| 1989 | Quantum Leap | Shirley Winnick | 1 episode |
| 1989, 1990 | Newhart | Chantal | 2 episodes |
| 1990 | Freddy's Nightmares | Peggy | 1 episode |
| 1990 | Who's the Boss? | Lisa Hansen | 1 episode |
| 1990 | Uncle Buck | Doreen Douche | 1 episode |
| 1994 | Murphy Brown | Diner #1 | 1 episode |
| 1995 | Days of Our Lives | Nurse Nancy/Nurse | 5 episodes |
| 1996 | Star Trek: Deep Space Nine | Aroya | 1 episode |
| 1999 | Arliss | Mrs. Dupree | 1 episode |
| 1999 | Suddenly Susan | | Voiceover for 2 episodes |
| 2001 | Strong Medicine | | 1 episode |
| 2006 | Ghost Whisperer | Customer | 1 episode |
| 2010 | Party Down | Vivian | 1 episode |
| 2011 | Hung | Carol | 1 episode |
| 2011 | Actors Entertainment | Self | 1 episode |
| 2011 | 16th Satellite Awards | Self/Presenter | TV special |
| 2014 | Castle | Deanna Maneri | 1 episode |
| 2019 | The Fix | Beth Meyer | 1 episode |
| 2020 | Etheria | Bartender | 1 episode, final appearance |
| 2025 | Merrily | Marielle | Posthumous |

== Awards ==
| Year | Association | Category | Work | Result | Reference |
|---|---|---|---|---|---|
| 2014 | Scare-A-Con Film Festival Awards | Best Supporting Actress | Last Look | Won | |
