= Al Adamson =

American filmmaker and actor (1929–1995)

- Born: Albert Victor Adamson Jr. July 25, 1929; Los Angeles, California, U.S.
- Died: June 21, 1995 (aged 65); Indio, California, U.S.
- Cause of death: Murder
- Occupations: Film director; producer; screenwriter; actor
- Years active: 1965–1983
- Spouse: Regina Carrol (m. 1972; died 1992)
- Parent(s): Victor Adamson (father); Dolores Booth (mother)

Albert Victor Adamson Jr. (July 25, 1929 – June 21, 1995) was an American filmmaker and actor, known as a prolific director of B movie horror and exploitation films throughout the 1960s and 1970s.

The son of silent film veterans Victor Adamson and Dolores Booth, Adamson began his career in the film industry at a young age and began directing in the early 1960s, helming a total of 33 feature films. Many of his films, such as Psycho A-Go-Go, Blood of Ghastly Horror, and Dracula vs. Frankenstein, went on to gain cult status. He cast his wife, actress and singer Regina Carrol, in many of his films.

Adamson retired from filmmaking in the early 1980s to pursue a career in real estate. In 1995, he was murdered by a live-in contractor whom he had hired to work on his house, and he was subsequently buried beneath the floor in his bathroom.

== Early life ==
Albert Victor Adamson Jr. was born in Hollywood, California, one of three children born to actors Dolores (née Booth) and Victor Adamson. Victor was a New Zealander who emigrated to the United States in the 1910s, becoming a silent film star and producer-director under the stage names "Denver Dixon" and "Art Mix". Dolores was from Nevada.

Adamson was involved in the film industry from an early age, appearing in the low budget 1935 film Desert Mesa, directed by his father. By his early thirties, he was managing a San Fernando nightclub called The Mutiny, featuring it in his 1965 film Psycho A-Go-Go.

== Film career ==
After assisting his father in making the 1961 western Half Way to Hell, where he served as an uncredited co-director, Adamson decided to work in the motion-picture industry himself full time. His father introduced him to a young aspiring film distributor named Sam Sherman in September 1962, and they worked together on various film projects during the 1960s. In 1969, Adamson and Sherman founded Independent-International Pictures (in partnership with Dan Kennis), which became the distributor for the many movies he directed, such as Blood of Ghastly Horror, Satan's Sadists and Dracula vs. Frankenstein.

Adamson and Sherman were early collaborators of cinematographers Vilmos Zsigmond and László Kovács, who would later find widespread mainstream success and acclaim as figureheads of the New Hollywood film movement. Adamson and Sherman hired Zsigmond, whom they nicknamed "Ziggy", because the young filmmaker owned his own equipment, including an 35mm Arriflex film camera and a Techniscope lens, which he carried around in a van. Zsigmond had an arrangement with his close friend Kovács where the two would recommend each other to directors, both claiming the other was the superior cinematographer. Their collaboration continued until 1971, when Zsigmond was nominated for a BAFTA Award for Best Cinematography for Robert Altman's McCabe & Mrs. Miller.

Victor Adamson also introduced Sam Sherman to producer Irwin Pizor, and Pizor, in turn, introduced Sherman to Kane W. Lynn and Eddie Romero of Hemisphere Pictures, and working together over the years, they all achieved successful careers in film production and distribution. Al Adamson developed a repertory company as the years rolled on, with a lot of the same actors turning up repeatedly in his films, such as Scott Brady, Kent Taylor, Robert Dix, John Cardos, Gary Kent, John Carradine, Russ Tamblyn, and Paula Raymond, among others.

When a friend in the business sold Sherman the rights to an unfinished Filipino horror movie, he let Adamson shoot additional footage which was inserted into the film and starred Robert Dix, Vicki Volante, and John Carradine to pad out the running time. The film was re-titled Horror of the Blood Monsters, and noted comic book artist Neal Adams designed a lurid poster for it, which helped sell the film to drive-in theaters. Since the original film was in black-and-white, Adamson had the whole film tinted in various colors and advertised the film as being made in a new process called Spectrum X. Sherman also hired artist Gray Morrow to design a number of their horror film posters, all of which were very graphic and "over the top".

Adamson created a western-horror hybrid film with his Five Bloody Graves (1969), which starred Robert Dix, John Carradine and Scott Brady, and inserted a number of ultra-violent scenes (savage Indian attacks, rapes, shootings and torture), and included narration scenes, with actor Gene Raymond playing "Death". Adamson filmed some of his movies at the Spahn Ranch in southern California (the adopted home of the notorious Manson Family), such as The Female Bunch (1969) and Angels' Wild Women (1972).

== Later career ==
In 1975, with the biker film genre fizzling out, Sam Sherman talked Adamson into directing some softcore porn films to cash in on the then-popular stewardess film craze, The Naughty Stewardesses, followed by Blazing Stewardesses the same year. They hired old-time western stars Bob Livingston and Don "Red" Barry to star. Material was written for the Three Stooges, but they had to pass due to poor health. Adamson considered their 1974 film Girls For Rent (a.k.a. I Spit on Your Corpse) a low point in their association, featuring porn actress Georgina Spelvin raping, and then killing, a mentally disabled man in one scene. Jessie's Girls was Adamson's take on the then-successful Raquel Welch film Hannie Caulder. In an interview a year before his death, Adamson mentioned it as one of the best films he had ever made. His last major film was the 1978 film Nurse Sherri, a horror film about a nurse who is possessed by the ghost of a woman who died during a surgical procedure, and is driven to avenge the dead woman by killing all of the doctors who were involved in her death.

Adamson largely retired from filmmaking in the early 1980s, focusing with his wife on a career in real estate. In 1993 he said he was going to direct three television films in the near future, with Sherman again producing: Beyond This Earth, Alien Landing, and Gold Rush. However, none of these films were ever released.

== Personal life ==
Adamson's wife, the actress Regina Carrol, performed in many of his later films. She met him in 1969 when he was casting Satan's Sadists, in which she starred, and began dating after the film was completed. They were married in 1972. Adamson said Regina was a waitress in a cafe at which he was having lunch, and hearing he was a movie director, she spilled a cup of coffee in his lap to get his attention. She died in 1992 from cancer at age 49. Adamson had spent several years trying desperately to save her from the disease, to no avail. He commented, "She went through a lot of pain at the end. There wasn't much I could do about it, just stay with her." He was murdered three years after his wife died.

== Murder ==
Adamson was reported missing in 1995. Five weeks later, after law enforcement officials discovered his remains beneath the concrete and tile-covered floor where his hot tub once sat at his home in Indio, California, his live-in contractor Fred Fulford was arrested at the Coral Reef Hotel in Saint Petersburg, Florida.

Adamson had hired Fulford to repair his house, which he intended to flip. He had given Fulford a credit card to use to purchase supplies, which Fulford quickly overspent and abused. Adamson had several confrontations with Fulford, the last of which ended violently in Adamson's death. Fulford subsequently buried his body and covered it with concrete and tile. Adamson's housekeeper became suspicious over his disappearance and the removal of the hot tub, which led investigators to Fulford and Adamson's body.

Fulford was convicted of murder, and sentenced to 25 years to life in prison. Regular Adamson actor and stuntman Gary Kent testified in the trial as the last person to speak to the director prior to the murder. Adamson was cremated and his ashes scattered in the Pacific Ocean.

The case of Al Adamson's murder is documented in the Investigation Discovery television series' Forensic Detectives (ep. "Buried Secrets"), The New Detectives (season 07, episode 11), and A Stranger in My Home (season 02, episode 06, "Death's Final Cut"). Blood & Flesh: The Reel Life and Ghastly Death of Al Adamson, a full-length documentary released by Severin Films, covers the entirety of Adamson's life, film career, and untimely death. The documentary is included in Severin's Blu-ray boxed set career retrospective of Adamson's work.

== Filmography ==
- Desert Mesa (1935) actor in a film from his father Denver Dixon
- Mormon Conquest (1939) actor in another, lost, film from his father
- Half Way to Hell (1960) co-direction with his father, also actor
- Psycho A-Go-Go (1965) later reworked into The Fiend with the Electronic Brain
- Blood of Dracula's Castle (1967)
- Lash of Lust (1968/72) (Lost Film, direction under alias name George Sheaffer)
- The Fiend with the Electronic Brain (1969) later reworked into Blood of Ghastly Horror
- The Female Bunch (1969) a.k.a. A Time to Run
- Five Bloody Graves (1969)
- Satan's Sadists (1969)
- Doomsday Voyage (1969/72) producer only
- Hell's Bloody Devils (1970)
- Horror of the Blood Monsters (1970) a.k.a. Vampire Men of the Lost Planet
- Dracula vs. Frankenstein (1971)
- Brain of Blood (1971)
- Blood of Ghastly Horror (1971)
- Angels' Wild Women (1972) a.k.a. Screaming Angels
- Hammer (1972) producer only
- Cry Rape (1973) (TV movie, producer only)
- The Naughty Stewardesses (1973)
- Dynamite Brothers (1974) a.k.a. Stud Brown
- I Spit on Your Corpse (1974) originally released as Girls for Rent
- Jessie's Girls (1975)
- Blazing Stewardesses (1975)
- Females for Hire (1976) - edited reissure of 1969 German film On the Reeperbahn at Half Past Midnight
- Black Heat (1976) a.k.a. Girls' Hotel
- Uncle Tom's Cabin (1977) - edited reissue of 1965 German film Onkel Tom's Hütte
- Nurses for Sale (1977) - edited reissue of 1971 German film Captain Roughneck from St. Pauli
- Black Samurai (1977)
- Cinderella 2000 (1977)
- Death Dimension (1978) a.k.a. The Kill Factor or Death Dogs
- Sunset Cove (1978)
- Nurse Sherri (1978)
- Bedroom Stewardesses (1978) - edited reissue of 1968 German film The Doctor of St. Pauli
- Chuck Connors Great Western Theatre (1980/82) TV Series
- Doctor Dracula (1980/83) - edited reissue of 1974 film Lucifer's Women
- Carnival Magic (1983)
- Lost (1983)
- Beyond This Earth (1992-1994) segment director (unreleased film)
- From Other Worlds (1992-1994) segment director (unreleased film, sequel from Beyond This Earth)
- The Happy Hobo - Presentation Reel (1994/2020) (short, last film direction)
- Al Adamson - Drive-in Monster (1995) (short documentary portrait with last interview)
