= Outlaw biker film =

Film genre

The outlaw biker film is a film genre that portrays its characters as motorcycle riding rebels. The characters are usually members of an outlaw motorcycle club.

== History ==
Outlaw biker clubs formed in the late 1940s on the West Coast after the end of World War II. Their culture was first popularized in the Marlon Brando film The Wild One (1953), which tells a story based very loosely on actual events, the 1947 Hollister riot. The film's success was followed by a string of low-budget exploitation films aimed at a teenage audience such as Motorcycle Gang (1957) and The Hot Angel (1958). But the genre really took off in the mid-1960s, after the Hells Angels motorcycle club became prominent in the media, in particular, after Hunter S. Thompson's book Hell's Angels: The Strange and Terrible Saga of the Outlaw Motorcycle Gangs (1966) was published.

=== Films of the 1960s ===
In 1965, director Russ Meyer made Motorpsycho (aka Motor Psycho), an obscure film about an evil motorcycle gang led by a disturbed Vietnam War veteran. In 1966, American International Pictures (AIP) released The Wild Angels with Peter Fonda, Bruce Dern, and Nancy Sinatra. This film, aimed at the teenage drive-in crowd, was a surprise hit and a new exploitation film subgenre was born. AIP dominated the market and quickly released a semi-sequel Devil's Angels starring actor-director John Cassavetes and The Glory Stompers with Dennis Hopper in 1967.

In 1968, AIP produced The Mini-Skirt Mob, Angels from Hell, and The Savage Seven (the film debut of actress/director Penny Marshall). The company made five more biker gang films: Hell's Belles (1969), Hell's Angels '69 (1969), Angel Unchained (1970), The Hard Ride (1971), and Chrome and Hot Leather (1971).

AIP and Fanfare Films also co-produced The Born Losers (1967). Fanfare made Hells Angels on Wheels (1967) with Jack Nicholson, Run, Angel, Run! (1969), Wild Wheels (1969), and Nam's Angels (1970).

Other small independent filmmakers went on to produce dozens of low-budget biker films until the trend dissipated in the early '70s. Crown International produced and/or distributed Wild Rebels (1967), The Hellcats (1968), The Sidehackers (1969), Wild Riders (1971), and Pink Angels (1972). Independent-International Pictures Corp. produced three films in this genre directed by Al Adamson – Satan's Sadists (1969), Hell's Bloody Devils (1970), and Angels' Wild Women (1972).

The Rebel Rousers (filmed 1967, released 1970) featured Jack Nicholson, Bruce Dern, and Harry Dean Stanton. Dern also starred as a sadistic gang leader in The Cycle Savages (1970). In 1969, Peter Fonda, Hopper, and Nicholson teamed up on the classic "hippie biker" movie, Easy Rider, the antithesis of the violent biker-gang genre.

Sonny Barger, founder of the Oakland chapter of the Hells Angels, was a consultant on several films. He and other gang members appeared as extras in Hells Angels on Wheels and Hell's Angels '69. The Hells Angels appeared as extras playing a gang called the Las Vegas Hotdoggers in the Roger Corman film Naked Angels (1969) starring Michael Greene.

=== The Born Losers ===
The Born Losers (1967) introduced Tom Laughlin's character Billy Jack. Unable to get his Billy Jack script produced, Laughlin wrote and directed The Born Losers to capitalize on the current biker movie trend (which finally allowed him to make Billy Jack in 1971). The story was inspired by news reports of the Hells Angels terrorizing a California community. As a cost-saving measure, a stunt scene of a motorcycle crashing into a pond was taken from co-producer AIP's comedy The Ghost in the Invisible Bikini (1966).

The Born Losers is also significant for its social criticism and portrayal of the biker gang as a force of pure, unredeemable evil. Here, for the first time, a lone hero stands up to, and ultimately defeats, the gang. Prior to this, the majority of the films in this genre imitated The Wild One with a sympathetic gang member (the reluctant leader or a new member) who ultimately rejects the outlaw biker lifestyle. Prime examples are the Fonda character in The Wild Angels, Jack Nicholson in Hells Angels on Wheels (1967), and Joe Namath in C.C. and Company (1970).

Jack Starrett has the role of a tough-talking police officer. He played essentially the same character in Hells Angels on Wheels and Angels from Hell (1968). Starrett was also in Hell's Bloody Devils (1970), and directed Run, Angel, Run (1969) . In Nam's Angels (1970) the bikers are portrayed as patriotic heroes sent on a rescue mission to Vietnam.

=== Novelty biker films ===
A number of novelty films were made featuring all-female biker gangs such as The Hellcats aka Biker Babes (1967), She-Devils on Wheels (1968), The Mini-Skirt Mob (from AIP) with Sherry Jackson and Harry Dean Stanton (1968), Sisters in Leather (1969) with Pat Barrington, Angels' Wild Women (1972), Cycle Vixens (1978), and Chrome Angels (2009).

The Pink Angels (1971) is a somewhat campy film about a gang of homosexual bikers who head down the coast to attend a drag ball. Bury Me an Angel (1972) is a revenge story featuring a female biker (and female director). Angels' Wild Women (1972) centers around a group of tough female bikers who dominate men and eventually go a revenge-driven rampage. The story (and original Screaming Angels title) was changed after the producers found theaters were no longer interested in traditional biker films. Inspired by the popularity of Roger Corman's The Big Doll House (1971), a violent women in prison film with Pam Grier, new scenes were added featuring aggressive female bikers and a Pam Grier lookalike was added to the cast. The reworked and retitled film was a box office success.

In Japan, female biker films became popular starting with Alleycat Rock: Female Boss (a.k.a. Stray Cat Rock: Delinquent Girl Boss or Female Juvenile Delinquent Leader: Alleycat Rock or Wildcat Rock) (1970). This trend was part of the sukeban (delinquent girl) subgenre of Toei's "Pinky violence" style of Pink film. The series continued with Stray Cat Rock: Wild Jumbo, Stray Cat Rock: Sex Hunter, Stray Cat Rock: Machine Animal and Alleycat Rock: Crazy Riders '71. Another similar series of exploitation films with female bikers includes Delinquent Girl Boss: Ballad of the Yokohama Hoods (1971), Girl Boss: Queen Bee Strikes Again (a.k.a. Girl Boss Blues: Queen Bee’s Counterattack) (1971), and Girl Boss Guerilla (1972).

=== The 1970s to the present ===
In 1970, Roger Corman left AIP to form New World Pictures which released Angels Die Hard (1970), Angels Hard as They Come (1971), and Bury Me an Angel (1971).

As the trend began to lose momentum, filmmakers started to create horror hybrids such as Werewolves on Wheels (1971) and Blood Freak (1972). The British horror film Psychomania (1973) involves a biker gang that makes a pact with the devil to obtain immortality.

Black motorcycle gangs appeared in a few blaxploitation films such as The Black Angels (1970) and The Black Six (1974).

The biker gang ethos also featured strongly in the famed low budget Australian production Mad Max (1979, dir. George Miller, starring Mel Gibson), with the film spawning the real-life subculture of survival bikes.

By the late 1980s, the once shocking and controversial genre became an object of campy humor in horror-comedies such as Chopper Chicks in Zombietown (1989), I Bought a Vampire Motorcycle (1990), and Biker Zombies (2001).

Beyond the Law (1992) is based on a true story and centers on Dan Saxon (Charlie Sheen), an undercover cop who infiltrates a group of criminal outlaw bikers. Larry Ferguson wrote the screenplay after reading the article "Undercover Angel" by Lawrence Linderman in the July, 1981 issue of Playboy on an undercover agent named Dan Black.

2000 film Hochelaga, a French-Canadian movie by Michel Jetté that depicts biker gang culture and activity in Montréal, Québec during the Québec Biker War of the late 90s and early 2000s.

2003 film Biker Boyz, starring Laurence Fishburne and Djimon Hounsou, depicts illegal bike racing gangs, although neither are criminals.

2004 film Torque, which features Adam Scott, Martin Henderson and Ice Cube, is about a biker who is faced by a rival gang leader for taking his bikes (which carry drugs), and is then framed for the murder of a member of a third gang.

Quentin Tarantino served as executive producer on Hell Ride (2008) starring Dennis Hopper and Michael Madsen. This is an homage to the motorcycle gang films of the past. It was written and directed by Larry Bishop, who acted in a number of biker films such as The Savage Seven (1968). Tarantino is a noted fan of the Australian biker movie, Stone (1974).

Sons of Anarchy (2008–2014) is an American television drama series about a California motorcycle club. The series premiered on September 3, 2008, on cable network FX.

The documentary Biker Mania (2009) includes a compilation of theater trailers and footage that tracks the history of the genre from the 1950s to the present.

Edward Winterhalder is the subject of a feature-length documentary movie about the outlaw biker lifestyle that is being filmed in Dubai and the US.

Mayans M.C. (2018–2023) is an American television drama series that takes place in the same fictional universe as Sons of Anarchy and focuses on the Sons' rivals-turned-allies, the Mayans Motorcycle Club.

The Bikeriders (2023) film is inspired by the photo-book of the same name by Danny Lyon, depicting the Vandals Motorcycle Club in the 1960s-70s, a fictional version of the Outlaws Motorcycle Club.

== Cultural references and parodies ==
After the release of The Wild One (1953), the image of the motorcycle gang, particularly the Marlon Brando character, inspired many imitators and satires in films and television shows.

=== Film ===
- From 1963 to 1966 American International Pictures produced a series of seven Beach party films. All but one featured Harvey Lembeck doing a Brando parody as Eric Von Zipper, inept leader of The Rat Pack motorcycle gang. These films are: Beach Party (1963), Bikini Beach and Pajama Party (both 1964), Beach Blanket Bingo and How to Stuff a Wild Bikini (both 1965), and The Ghost in the Invisible Bikini (1966).
- The Horror of Party Beach (1964), a campy beach party-horror hybrid, includes a motorcycle gang most likely inspired by the popular American International beach movies.
- The Owl and the Pussycat (1970); a would-be actress (Barbra Streisand) makes an adult film, Cycle Sluts. Photos of her and a biker gang posing in skimpy BDSM-style leather gear appears on posters outside a theater.
- Every Which Way but Loose (1978), John Quade plays Cholla, the leader of the inept Black Widows motorcycle gang who have frequent disastrous run-ins with Philo Beddoe (played by Clint Eastwood).

=== Music ===
- The girl group The Shangri-Las scored a Number #1 hit single with their motorcycle gang pop song "Leader of the Pack" (1964).
- "Blue's Theme", an instrumental rock song that opens with the sound of a motorcycle engine, was featured on the soundtrack for The Wild Angels film. The song, written by Davie Allan and The Arrows, was a hit single in 1967.

=== Television ===
- The Beverly Hillbillies ("The Clampetts Go Hollywood", 1963), inspired by The Wild One, Jethro gets a motorcycle and imitates Marlon Brando's mannerisms and biker outfit.
- The Twilight Zone ("Black Leather Jackets", 1964), a group of aliens disguised as a motorcycle gang takes up residence in a small American town.
- The Addams Family ("The Addams Family Meets a Beatnik", 1965), a runaway rebel crashes his motorcycle in front of the Addams' house and stays with the family for a few days. Their non-judgmental acceptance of him leads to his reuniting with his estranged father.
- The Munsters ("Hot Rod Herman", 1965), drag-race story in which Herman dons a leather biker jacket and accessories and does a comedic impression of Brando from The Wild One.
- The Dick Van Dyke Show ("Br-rooom, Br-rooom", 1965), Rob (Van Dyke) buys a motorcycle and leather jacket, meets a biker gang at a hamburger stand, and almost gets arrested after the police arrive.
- I Spy ("Trial by Treehouse", 1966), Kelley Robinson (Robert Culp) goes undercover as a Brando-esque leader of a motorcycle gang. Culp wears the same type of hat, sunglasses, and leather outfit and affects some of Brando's mannerisms.
- Lost In Space ("Collision of the Planets", 1967), the Robinsons contend with a gang of unruly interplanetary space bikers led by Daniel J. Travanti.
- Get Smart ("The Mild Ones", 1967), a genre parody featuring The Purple Knights, a literate biker gang who see themselves as modern Arthurian knights. Max and 99 must pass as new gang members to rescue a kidnapped prime minister.
- The Monkees ("The Wild Monkees", 1967), the guys pretend to be a biker gang to impress four tough female motorcyclists. Trouble ensues when the girls' boyfriends arrive, the Black Angels biker gang.
- Petticoat Junction ("One of Our Chickens Is Missing", 1969); A pair of tough, surly bikers (Harry Dean Stanton, Jack Bannon) who are suspected of poaching, intimidate mild-mannered game warden Orrin Pike.
- The Mod Squad ("A Town Called Sincere", 2:17, 1970), Pete and Linc stumble upon a motorcycle gang terrorizing a small Mexican town.
- The Partridge Family ("A Man Called Snake", 1971), Laurie Partridge briefly dates Snake (Rob Reiner), a gruff but surprisingly sensitive member of The Rogues biker gang. In the 1972 episode "A Penny for His Thoughts", Snake (now played by Stuart Margolin) makes a return appearance.
- The Mod Squad ("The Thundermakers", 5:2, 1972), A youth joins a motorcycle gang that plans to pull off a robbery of his father's company.
- Mannix ("A Way to Dusty Death", 7:2, 1973), Mannix is hired to find a missing teenager who gets mixed up with a motorcycle gang.
- Saturday Night Live (Feb. 14, 1976), John Belushi and guest host Peter Boyle both dress up as Brando from The Wild One for a "Dueling Brandos" parody sketch.
- Saturday Night Live (Nov. 18, 1978), guest host Carrie Fisher was featured in a beach movie parody skit ("Beach Blanket Bimbo from Outer Space") in which John Belushi played Harvey Lembeck's leather-clad Eric Von Zipper character.
- The Rockford Files ("The Return of the Black Shadow", 1979), straightforward drama pays homage to classic '60s biker films.
- CHiPs ("Satan's Angels", 4:7, 1980), Officer Bonnie Clark is kidnapped by a biker gang.
- Saturday Night Live (February 20, 1982), guest host and biker film veteran Bruce Dern appears in the parody sketch "The Mild One". He plays a thoughtful, Zen-inspired leader of a biker gang who uses philosophy instead of violence to terrorize people in a diner.
- T.J. Hooker ("Hooker's War", 1982), Sergeant T.J. Hooker (William Shatner) pursues an outlaw motorcycle gang dealing in illegal guns.
- Miami Vice ("Viking Bikers from Hell", 1987), revenge story about a violent biker gang.
- Homicide: Life on the Street ("Cradle to Grave", 1995), detectives investigate the death of a biker gang member.

== See also ==
- List of biker films
