= List of biker films =

This list is for films where at least one biker appears as a significant plot element. A bike in a film does not qualify for this list.

== Before 1960 ==
- The Uncontrollable Motorcycle (1909)
- Alkali Ike's Motorcycle (1912)
- A Motorcycle Adventure (1912)
- Mabel at the Wheel (1914), early Charlie Chaplin film
- A Motorcycle Elopement (1915)
- Sherlock Jr. (1924), Buster Keaton film with world-famous motorcycle scene
- No Limit (1935), starring George Formby
- Step On It (1936)
- Call the Mesquiteers (1938), directed by John English, starring Robert Livingston
- They Caught the Ferry (1948)
- Once a Jolly Swagman (1949)
- Full Speed Ahead (1951)
- The Pace That Thrills (1952)
- Code Two (1953)
- The Wild One (1953)
- An American in Rome (1954)
- The Black Rider (1954)
- Teenage Devil Dolls (1955)
- Engaged to Death (1957)
- Motorcycle Gang (1957)
- Dragstrip Riot (1958)
- The Hot Angel (1958)
- Ivy League Killers (1959)
- Les Motards (1959)

== 1960s ==
- Some People (1962)
- The Damned (1963)
- Roustabout (1964)
- The Leather Boys (1964)
- Scorpio Rising (1964)
- Motorpsycho (a.k.a. Motor Psycho) (1965)
- The Love Merchant (1966)
- Girls from Thunder Strip (1966)
- Outlaw Motorcycles (1966)
- Teenage Gang Debs (1966)
- The Wild Angels (1966)
- The Born Losers (1967, released 1969)
- Devil's Angels (1967)
- The Glory Stompers (1967)
- Hells Angels on Wheels (1967)
- The Hellcats (a.k.a. Biker Babes) (1967)
- The Rebel Rousers (1967, released 1970)
- Wild Rebels (1967)
- Angels from Hell (1968)
- The Angry Breed (1968)
- The Great Chase, Breaking It Up (1968)
- The Girl on a Motorcycle (1968)
- Hell's Chosen Few (1968)
- The Mini-Skirt Mob (1968)
- The Sweet Ride (1968)
- Mr. Kinky (1968)
- Biker Babylon (a.k.a. It's a Revolution Mother) (1968)
- The Savage Seven (1968)
- Savages from Hell (1968)
- She-Devils on Wheels (1968)
- The Cycle Savages (1969)
- Easy Rider (1969)
- Five the Hard Way (a.k.a. The Sidehackers) (1969)
- Free Grass (a.k.a. Scream Free!) (1969)
- Hell's Belles (1969)
- Hell's Angels '69 (1969)
- Naked Angels (1969)
- Run, Angel, Run! (1969)
- Satan's Sadists (a.k.a. Nightmare Bloodbath) (1969)
- Shahr-e hert (1969)
- Sinner's Blood (1969)
- Sisters in Leather (1969)
- Wild Wheels (1969)

Harvey Lembeck also did a parody of Marlon Brando from The Wild One as the bumbling leader of the inept Rat Pack motorcycle gang in six Beach Party films: Beach Party (1963), Bikini Beach and Pajama Party (both 1964), Beach Blanket Bingo and How to Stuff a Wild Bikini (both 1965), and The Ghost in the Invisible Bikini (1966).

== 1970s ==
- Alleycat Rock: Female Boss (a.k.a. Stray Cat Rock: Delinquent Girl Boss or Female Juvenile Delinquent Leader: Alleycat Rock or Wildcat Rock) (1970), first in the 5-film Japanese Alleycat Rock or Stray Cat Rock series
- Angel Unchained (1970)
- Angels Die Hard (a.k.a. Rough Boys) (1970)
- Bigfoot (1970)
- The Black Angels (a.k.a. Black Bikers from Hell) (1970)
- Bolidi Sull'Asfalto - A Tutta Birra! (1970)
- C.C. and Company (1970)
- Devil Rider! (1970), starring Ridgely Abele as James Aldrige
- The Girls from Thunder Strip (1970)
- Hell's Bloody Devils (1970), a mashup between the unreleased 1967 film The Fakers and added biker scenes / storyline
- Little Fauss and Big Halsy (1970)
- The Losers (a.k.a. Nam's Angels) (1970)
- No Blade of Grass (1970)
- Outlaw Bikers - The Gang Wars (1970)
- Stray Cat Rock: Wild Jumbo (a.k.a. Alleycat Rock: Wild Jumbo) (1970), second of the Japanese Alleycat Rock or Stray Cat Rock series
- Stray Cat Rock: Sex Hunter (a.k.a. Alleycat Rock: Sex Hunter) (1970), third of the Japanese Alleycat Rock or Stray Cat Rock series
- Stray Cat Rock: Machine Animal (a.k.a. Alleycat Rock: Machine Animal) (1970), fourth of the Japanese Alleycat Rock or Stray Cat Rock series
- Stray Cat Rock: Crazy Riders '71 (a.k.a. Alleycat Rock: Crazy Riders '71) (1971), fifth of the Japanese Alleycat Rock or Stray Cat Rock series
- Weekend with the Babysitter (1970)
- Angels Hard as They Come (1971)
- Chrome and Hot Leather (1971)
- The Incredible 2-Headed Transplant (1971)
- Delinquent Girl Boss: Ballad of the Yokohama Hoods (1971)
- Evel Knievel (1971)
- Girl Boss: Queen Bee Strikes Again (a.k.a. Girl Boss Blues: Queen Bee’s Counterattack) (1971)
- The Hard Ride (1971)
- The Jesus Trip (1971)
- On Any Sunday (1971)
- Outlaw Riders (1971)
- The Peace Killers (1971)
- The Pink Angels (1971)
- The Proud Rider (1971)
- Psychomania (a.k.a. The Death Wheelers) (1971)
- Ride Hard, Ride Wild (1971)
- Ride the Hot Wind (1971)
- The Tormentors (1971)
- Vanishing Point (1971)
- Werewolves on Wheels (1971)
- The Wild Riders (a.k.a. Angels for Kicks) (1971)
- The Windsplitter (1971)
- Angels' Wild Women (1972)
- Bury Me an Angel (1972)
- Continental Circus (1972)
- The Dirt Gang (1972)
- Blood Freak (1972)
- Fritz the Cat (1972)
- Cancel My Reservation (1972)
- Bad, Bad, Gang! (1972)
- Girl Boss Guerilla (a.k.a. Sukeban Gerira) (1972)
- J.C. (a.k.a. The Iron Horsemen) (1972)
- The Thing with Two Heads (1972)
- The Loners (1972)
- Sleazy Rider (1972)
- The Big Score (a.k.a. A Ton of Grass Goes to Pot) (1972)
- Cycle Psycho (a.k.a. Savage Abduction) (1973)
- Electra Glide in Blue (1973)
- Camper John (a.k.a. Gentle Savage) (1973)
- Hex (a.k.a. Charms) (1973)
- Road of Death (1973)
- Horror Hospital (1973)
- Teenager (a.k.a. The Real Thing) (1974)
- La minorenne (1974)
- The Black Six (1974)
- Darktown Strutters (1974)
- Pray for the Wildcats (television film, 1974)
- Stone (1974)
- What Have They Done to Your Daughters? (1974)
- You and Me (1975)
- Act of Aggression (1975)
- Sidecar Racers (1975)
- Syndicate Sadists (1975)
- Race with the Devil (1975)
- Trip with the Teacher (1975)
- Blonde in Black Leather (1975)
- Detonation: Violent Riders (a.k.a. Bakuhatsu! Bakuhatsu) (1975)
- Detonation: 750CC zoku (a.k.a. Bakuhatsu! Nana-han zoku) (1976)
- Detonation: Violent Games (a.k.a. Bakuhatsu! Boso yugi) (1976)
- Season of Violence (a.k.a. Boso no Kisetsu) (1976)
- God Speed You! Black Emperor (1976)
- The Gumball Rally (1976)
- Hollywood Man (1976)
- Northville Cemetery Massacre (a.k.a. Freedom R.I.P. or Harley's Angels) (1976)
- Killers On Wheels (a.k.a. Karate Killers on Wheels and Speed Gang) (Hong Kong, 1976)
- One Away (1976)
- Checkered Flag or Crash (1977)
- Whiskey Mountain (1977)
- Sidewinder One (1977)
- The Gauntlet (1977)
- Cosy Cool (1977)
- Viva Knievel (1977)
- Foul Play (1977)
- Animal House (1978)
- Get a Ride (1978)
- Cycle Vixens (1978)
- Dawn of the Dead (1978)
- Deathsport (1978)
- Every Which Way But Loose (1978)
- Fast Charlie... the Moonbeam Rider (1979)
- Dirt (1979)
- Spree (1979)
- Mad Max (1979)
- Quadrophenia (1979)

== 1980s ==
- La Bande du Rex (1980)
- The Great Skycopter Rescue (1980)
- Pick-up Summer (1980)
- Spetters (1980)
- Hog Wild (1980)
- Intrepidos Punks (1980)
- Any Which Way You Can (1980)
- Kuruizaki sanda rodo (1980)
- Take It to the Limit (1980)
- Terrorgang (also known as Beyond Terror and Further Than Fear) (1980)
- Knightriders (1981)
- Mad Foxes (1981)
- Nomad Riders (1981)
- Mad Max 2 (also known as The Road Warrior) (1981)
- Return of the Rebels (1981)
- Silver Dream Racer (1981)
- 1990: The Bronx Warriors (1982)
- The Aftermath (1982)
- Bakuretsu toshi (1982)
- Grease 2 (1982)
- High Teen Boogie (1982)
- The Last Hero (film) (1982)
- The Loveless (1982)
- Megaforce (1982)
- Timerider: The Adventure of Lyle Swann (1982)
- Warrior of the Lost World (1983)
- 2019, After the Fall of New York (1983)
- Escape from the Bronx (also known as Bronx Warriors 2 or Fuga Dal Bronx) (1983)
- Hells Angels Forever (1983), a documentary
- Rumble Fish (1983)
- Hero (1983)
- Çöl (also known as Turkish Jaws) (1983)
- Survival Zone (1983)
- Young Warriors (1983)
- Hell Riders (1984)
- Space Riders (1984)
- Purple Rain (1984)
- Streets of Fire (1984)
- Reckless (1984)
- Warriors of the Year 2072 (1984)
- City Limits (1985)
- The Dirt Bike Kid (1985)
- Mad Max Beyond Thunderdome (1985)
- Demons (1985)
- Mask (1985)
- Savage Dawn (1985)
- Street Hawk (1985)
- Restless Natives (1985)
- Eat The Peach (1986)
- The Wraith (1986)
- Eye of the Tiger (1986)
- Little Shop of Horrors (1986)
- The Majorettes (1986)
- Vamp (1986)
- Land of Doom (1986)
- Cyclone (1987)
- Winners Take All (1987)
- The Black Cobra (1987)
- The Danger Zone (1987)
- Raising Arizona (1987)
- Warlords of Hell (1987)
- Motorcycle Diaries (1987), a documentary
- Akira (1988)
- The Dark Side Of The Sun (1988)
- The Mouse and the Motorcycle (1988)
- Runaway Ralph (1988)
- Dead Mate (1988)
- Nightmare Beach (1988)
- Shame (1988)
- Dead End City (1988)
- Black Rain (1989)
- Chopper Chicks in Zombietown (1989)
- Eversmile, New Jersey (1989)
- Crossing the Line (1989)
- Easy Wheels (1989)
- Race for Glory (1989)
- Nam Angels (1989)
- All About Ah-Long (1989)
- Danger Zone II: Reaper's Revenge (1989)

== 1990s ==
- Danger Zone III: Steel Horse War (1990)
- Cry-Baby (1990)
- Don't Tell Her It's Me (1990)
- The Final Alliance (1990)
- I Bought a Vampire Motorcycle (1990)
- Another 48 Hrs. (1990)
- Masters of Menace (1990)
- A Moment of Romance (1990)
- Blood Ties (1991)
- Born to Ride (1991)
- Harley Davidson and the Marlboro Man (1991)
- The Last Riders (1991)
- Dark Rider (1991)
- Harley (1991)
- Cool as Ice (1991)
- Stone Cold (1991)
- Beyond the Law (a.k.a. Fixing the Shadow or Made of Steel) (1992)
- Double Cross (1992)
- Motor Psycho (1992)
- The Silencer (1992)
- Sweet Justice (1992)
- Snake Eater III: His Law (1992)
- Samurai Vampire Bikers from Hell (1992)
- Chrome Soldiers (1992)
- Roadside Prophets (1992)
- A Moment of Romance II (1993)
- Running Cool (1993)
- Caro Diario (1993)
- The Last Border (1993)
- Bikers, Blondes and Blood (1993), a documentary
- Iron Horsemen (a.k.a. Bad Trip) (1994)
- Ride with the Wind (1994)
- Jailbreakers (1994)
- Trust in Me (1994)
- Rebel Run (1994)
- Wonder Seven (1994)
- Lazy Man's Zen (1994), a documentary
- She Lives to Ride (1994), a documentary
- Motorcycle Gang (1994)
- Valley of the Cycle Sluts (a.k.a. Death Riders) (1994)
- The Stranger (1995)
- Full Throttle (1995)
- Full Throttle (1995), animation film
- The Demolitionist (1995)
- Rebellious (1995)
- Rumble in the Bronx (1995)
- Barb Wire (1996)
- Going Places: Biking the Black Hills (1997), a documentary
- Evel Knivel's Spectacular Jumps (1997), a documentary
- Violetta la reine de la moto (1997)
- Ground Rules (1997)
- Flat Out (1998)
- Biker Dreams (1998), a documentary
- Evel Knivel: Hell on Whells (1998), a documentary
- Zombie Cult Massacre (1998)
- CHiPs '99 (1998)
- Inferno (a.k.a. Desert Heat or Coyote Moon) (1999)
- Me & Will (1999)
- The Legend of Speed (1999)
- Steal Wheels (1999)
- Murdercycle (1999)
- Point Doom (1999)
- Desert Diners (1999)
- The Privateer (1999), a documentary
- The Wild Ride of Outlaw Bikers (1999), a documentary

== 2000s ==
- Hellblock 13 (2000)
- Hochelaga (a.k.a. Riders) (2000)
- Radical Jack (2000)
- The Road (2000)
- He Would Have Rode a Harley (2000) a documentary
- Girl Gone Bad (2000) a documentary
- Biker Zombies (2001)
- Motocrossed (2001)
- Bhagaty Jao (2002)
- Lone Hero (2002)
- Biker Fantasies (2002)
- Leather and Iron (2002)
- Motorcycle Women (2002)
- Tattoo, a love story (2002)
- Biker Boyz (2003)
- Road Kings (a.k.a. Road Dogs) (2003)
- Danny Deckchair (2003)
- One Man's Island (Isle of Man) (2003)
- Faster (2003) a documentary
- Mondo Enduro (2003) a documentary
- The Brown Bunny (2003)
- Angel in Chains (2004)
- Evel Knivel (2004)
- Dhoom (2004)
- Silver Hawk (2004)
- Long Way Round (2004), a documentary
- The Motorcycle Diaries (2004)
- Torque (2004)
- Choppertown: the Sinners (2005), a feature documentary
- Dust to Glory (2005), Baja 1000 adventure/documentary
- The Rain Makers (2005)
- Supercross (2005)
- The World's Fastest Indian (2005)
- Barrio Angelz (2005)
- The Seeker (2005) a documentary
- Glory Road: The Legacy of the African-American Motorcyclist (2005) a documentary
- Harley Speed Junkies (2005) a documentary
- Wheels of Soul (2005) a documentary
- Hessians MC (2005) a documentary
- Greed (2006)
- GlobeRiders: Iceland Adventure (2006) a documentary
- Dhoom 2 (2006)
- The Doctor, the Tornado and the Kentucky Kid (2006)
- Riding Solo to the Top of the World (2006) a documentary
- Choppertown: From The Vault (2007), a documentary
- Ghost Rider (2007)
- Wild Hogs (2007), a comedy
- Hot Rod (2007)
- Long Way Down (2007), a documentary
- New Blood (2007), a documentary
- Missionary Man (2007)
- Glory Road: Silk Road Adventure (2007)
- Vampire Biker Babes (2007)
- The Indian (2007)
- Stories From the Road, Sturgis 2006 (2007), a documentary
- One Million Motorcycles (2007), a documentary
- Brittown (2008), a feature documentary
- Freebird (2008), a comedy
- Free Style (2008)
- Exit Speed (2008)
- Hell Ride (2008)
- Heroes (2008)
- Riders (2008)
- One Week (2008)
- Outlaw Bikers (2008)
- Redline America (2008), a documentary
- The Motorcycle Diarrheas (2008), a documentary
- GlobeRiders: Iceland Expedition (2008), a documentary
- GlobeRiders: IndoChina Expedition (2008), a documentary
- GlobeRiders: BMW F800 GS Adventure Touring Instructional DVD (2008), a documentary
- GlobeRiders: Eurasian Odyssey (2009), a documentary
- Biker Mania (2009), a documentary
- Chrome Angels (a.k.a. Cyborg Conquest) (2009), science fiction
- The Harbortown Bobber (2009), a feature documentary
- The Best Bar in America (2009), a documentary
- One Crazy Ride (2009)
- Easy Rider: The Ride Back (2009)
- Finding B.C. the Biker Chick (2009)
- Killer Biker Chicks (2009)
- Poker Run (a.k.a. Devil Riders) (2009)

== 2010s ==
- Attack the Gas Station 2 (2010)
- Dui Prithibi (2010)
- Buyusenki Battle Chronicle (2010)
- Hard Ride To Hell (2010)
- The Kids Are All Right (2010), a comedy-drama
- TT3D: Closer to the Edge (2010)
- The Violent Kind (2010), a horror movie
- Mammuth (2010)
- Machine Gun Preacher (2011)
- Born to Ride (2011)
- Quick (2011)
- Fastest (2011)
- Travellers (2011)
- Dear God No! (2011)
- I, Superbiker (2011)
- In search of Nirvana (2011)
- Ghost Rider: Spirit of Vengeance (2012)
- The Baytown Outlaws (2012)
- The Place Beyond the Pines (2012), a crime drama starring Ryan Gosling, Bradley Cooper and Eva Mendes
- Dead in Five Heart Beats (2013), a Sonny Barger movie
- Girl Meets Bike (2013)
- Neelakasham Pachakadal Chuvanna Bhoomi (2013)
- Sit Stay Ride: The Story of America's Sidecar Dogs (2014)
- Penton: The John Penton Story (2014)
- Morbidelli - a story of men and fast motorcycles (2014)
- Irumbu Kuthirai (2014)
- Dhoom 3 (2014)
- Road to Paloma (2014)
- Road (2014)
- Mad Max: Fury Road (2015)
- Biker's Adda (2015)
- Cymbeline (2015)
- Frankenstein Created Bikers (2016), sequel to Dear God No! (2011) from Big World Pictures
- Mancini, the Motorcycle Wizard (2016)
- Blood Ride (2017)
- 1% (2017)
- Motorcycle Girl (2018)
- American Dresser (2018)
- Mandy (2018)
- Long Way Up (2019), a documentary
- Morbidelli Rising (2019)

== 2020–present ==
- Life Of A 1%er (2020)
- Rough Boys (2020)
- Lost But Win (2020)
- Revenge Ride (2020)
- Roberrt (2021)
- Valimai (2022)
- The Bikeriders (2023)
- One Fast Move (2024)
- Hellhounds (2024)
- Pillion (2025)
