= John Cardos =

American film director (1929–2020)

John "Bud" Cardos
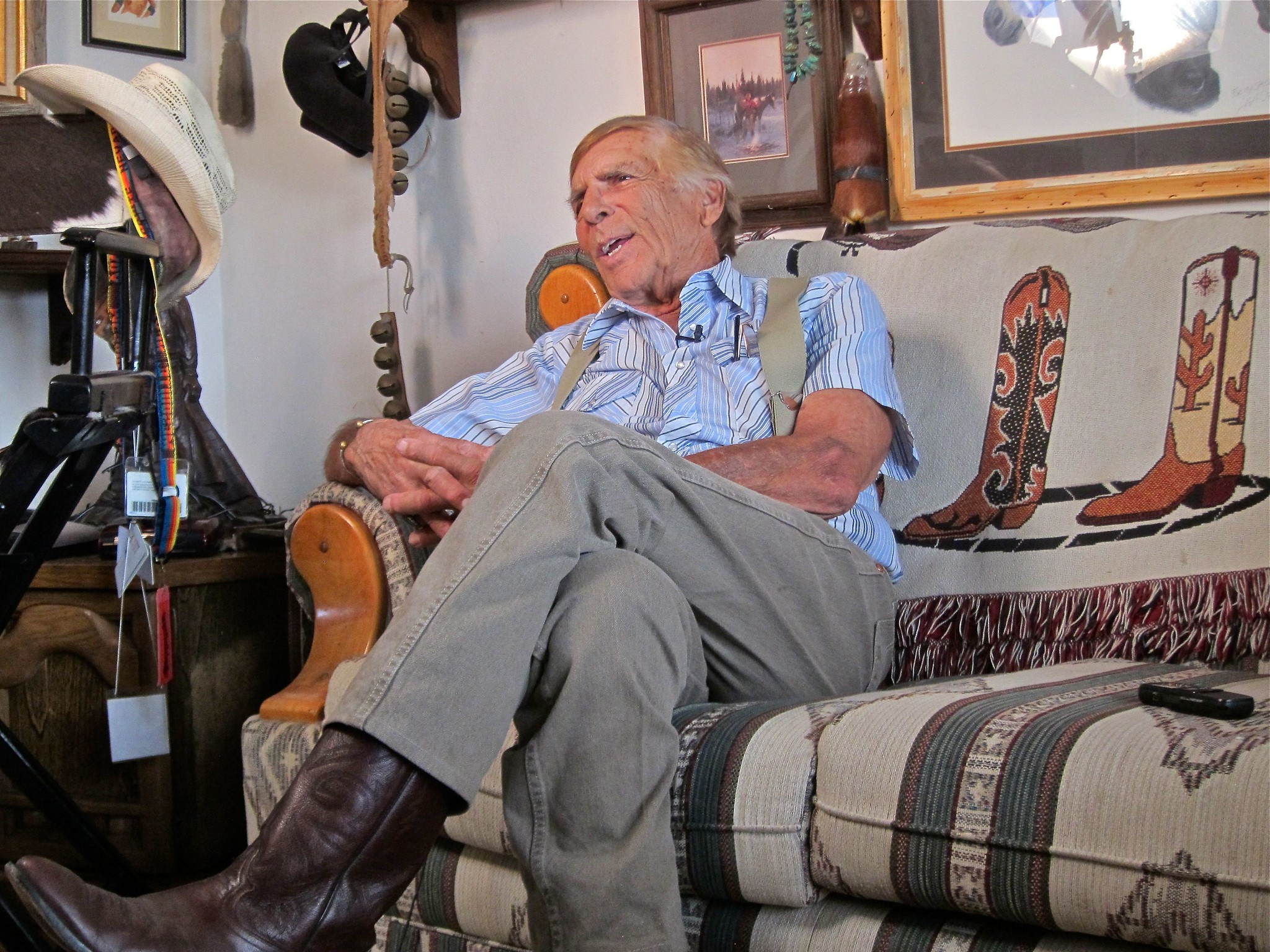
- Cardos in 2013
- Born: December 20, 1929; St. Louis, Missouri, U.S.
- Died: December 31, 2020 (aged 91); Acton, California, U.S.
- Occupation(s): Actor, stuntman, film director

John "Bud" Cardos (December 20, 1929 – December 31, 2020) was an American actor, stuntman and film director. His father and uncle managed Grauman's Egyptian and Chinese theatres. He made television guest appearances on The Monroes, The High Chaparral and NBC's Daniel Boone starring Fess Parker.

Cardos is the subject of the 2016 biography Action! by actor Robert Dix and his wife Lynette Dix. Robert Dix and Cardos starred together in the Al Adamson-directed biker film Satan's Sadists.

Cardos appeared as himself and talked about his stunt career in the documentary film Danger God, which is about his friend and fellow stuntman Gary Kent.

On December 31, 2020, Cardos died at his ranch in Acton, California, at the age of 91.

== Filmography as actor ==
=== Film ===
- Deadwood '76 (1965) - Hawk Russell
- Hells Angels on Wheels (1967)
- The Rebel Rousers (filmed in 1967, released in 1970) - Townsman
- The Road Hustlers (1968)
- Psych-Out (1968) - Thug
- Killers Three (1968) - Bates
- Nightmare in Wax (1969) - Sergeant Carver
- Blood of Dracula's Castle (1969)
- Satan's Sadists (1969) - Firewater
- Hell's Bloody Devils (1970)
- The Female Bunch (1971) - Mexican Farmer (uncredited)
- Breaking Point (1976) - Fleming
- Death Dimension (1978) - Driver Henchman (uncredited)
- Act of Piracy (1990) - Steward

=== Television ===
- The Monroes (1967) as Wolf in "Ghost of Paradox"
- Custer (1967) as Brave Bull in "Dangerous Prey"
- The High Chaparral (1967) as Third Bandit in "The Terrorist"
- Daniel Boone (1968) as Longknife in "The Dandy" and Tomochi in "Far Side of Fury"

== Filmography as director ==
- Soul Soldier (1970)
- Drag Racer (1970)
- Kingdom of the Spiders (1977)
- The Dark (1979)
- The Day Time Ended (1979)
- Mutant (1984)
- Outlaw of Gor (1988)
- Skeleton Coast (1988)
- Act of Piracy (1990)
- Legends of the West (1992) (documentary)
