= Angels' Wild Women =

- DVD cover
- Directed by: Al Adamson
- Written by: Al Adamson
- Produced by: Dan Q. Kennis; Samuel M. Sherman
- Starring: Ross Hagen; Kent Taylor; Preston Pierce; Regina Carrol; William Bonner
- Cinematography: Louis Horvath
- Music by: Don McGinnis
- Distributed by: Troma Entertainment
- Release date: 1972
- Running time: 85 minutes
- Language: English

Angels' Wild Women (originally titled Screaming Angels) is a 1972 biker film written and directed by cult director Al Adamson. Preceded by Satan's Sadists (1969) and Hell's Bloody Devils (1970), it is the last in a trio of (unrelated) motorcycle gang films directed by Adamson for Independent-International Pictures Corp., a company he co-founded with Sam Sherman. The plot centers on a group of tough biker babes who leave their cycle gang boyfriends to go on a violent rampage. When a cult leader kills one of the girls, the others go out for revenge.

== Plot ==
A group of good motorcyclists fight against an evil hippie cult based on the murderous "Manson family".

== Cast ==
- Ross Hagen – Speed
- Kent Taylor – Parker
- Preston Pierce – Turk
- Regina Carrol – Margo
- William Bonner – King
- Arne Warde – Slim
- Jill Woelfel – Donna (as Jill Woefel)
- Vicki Volante – Terry
- Albert Cole – Weasel
- Claire Polan – Love Child
- John Bloom – Big Foot
- Gus Peters – Preacher
- Linda Gordon – Sue
- Eric Lidberg – Freak
- Margo Hope – Orphan Girl
- Gil Serna – Biker
- Gary Kent – Rapist #1

== Production ==
Scenes were filmed at the Spahn Ranch where the Manson cult had lived and some former Manson associates appeared as extras. After the film was completed, the producers could not distribute the film due to the dissipation of the biker-gang trend. According to Sherman (Filmfax #28), "...overnight, the motorcycle trend dropped dead. I don't know why, but it just died. You couldn't give away a motorcycle picture." The popularity of Roger Corman's The Big Doll House, a violent women in prison film with Pam Grier, led to a reshoot. New scenes were added featuring tough, aggressive female bikers and a Pam Grier lookalike was added to the cast. The reworked and retitled film turned out to be a big box office success for the studio.

The film is distributed by Troma Entertainment.

== See also ==
- List of American films of 1972
