= The Losers (1970 film) =

1970 film by Jack Starrett

Nam's Angels
- Film poster
- Directed by: Jack Starrett
- Written by: Alan Caillou
- Produced by: Joe Solomon
- Starring: William Smith; Bernie Hamilton; Adam Roarke; Huston Savage; Ana Korita; John Garwood; Paul Koslo; Gene Cornelius
- Cinematography: Nonong Rasca
- Edited by: Richard K. Brockway
- Music by: Stu Phillips
- Distributed by: Fanfare Films Inc.
- Release date: August 5, 1970
- Running time: 95 minutes
- Country: United States
- Language: English
- Budget: $350,000 (estimated)

The Losers released on video as Nam's Angels is a 1970 American biker war film directed by Jack Starrett.

== Plot ==
The plot involves a gang of Hells Angels-type bikers called "The Devil's Advocates" involved in the Vietnam War. They are sent to the Cambodian jungle on Yamaha bikes in order to rescue an American diplomat/CIA Agent, Chet Davis.

The biker gang is led by Link Thomas, a Vietnam veteran and the brother of an Army Major who has recruited them. His gang consists of Duke, also a Vietnam veteran, Limpy, Speed, and another Vietnam veteran, Dirty Denny. They are under the orders of Army Captain Jackson.

The gang modifies their motorcycles in a garage run by Diem-Nuc. They weld armor plating with submachine guns on the handlebars. Limpy drives a three-wheeler modified from a Harley-Davidson frame with a Volkswagen rear end, that is armed with heavy .50 caliber machine guns and a multiple rocket launcher from a helicopter. In order to open fire on enemy soldiers in trees or towers the gang do wheelies whilst firing their weapons.

== Cast ==
- William Smith as Lincoln "Link" Thomas
- Bernie Hamilton as Captain Jackson
- Huston Savage as Denny "Dirty Denny"
- Adam Roarke as "Duke"
- Paul Koslo as "Limpy"
- Gene Cornelius as "Speed"
- John Garwood as Sergeant Winston
- Ana Korita as Kim Sue
- Vic Diaz as Diem-Nuc
- Alan Caillou as Albanian

== Production ==
On November 19, 1965, Sonny Barger the "Maximum Leader" of the Hells Angels motorcycle club sent a telegram to President Johnson offering the Angels as "gorilla fighters" (sic) in the Vietnam War. Though the President turned them down, the idea became a Vietnam War movie made in the Philippines using sets and crew from Too Late the Hero.

William Smith stated that the original ending had the rescued diplomat die whilst the gang lived, but Jack Starrett and Smith rewrote Alan Caillou's screenplay. Smith also stated that the earring he wore in the film was given to him by the Hells Angels during another motorcycle film he made.

Paul Koslo was taught to ride by the film's stuntman Gary McLarty.

Originally titled Nam's Angels, the title was changed before release to the more generic The Losers with composer Stu Phillips writing a song incorporating the title.

"The Devil's Advocates" gang also appears in the films Run, Angel, Run! and Werewolves on Wheels.

== In popular culture ==
A glimpse of the movie appears in Quentin Tarantino's Pulp Fiction, which Fabienne was watching, then had said "A motorcycle movie; I'm not sure the name.

John Milius said this film was a "big inspiration for Apocalypse Now."

== See also ==
- Outlaw biker film
- List of biker films
- Exploitation film
