= The Young Sinner =

The Young Sinner may refer to:

- The Young Sinner (1960 film), a West German drama film
- Like Father, Like Son (1961 film), also known as The Young Sinner, an American film
