= The Wild Angels =

1966 film by Roger Corman

- Theatrical release poster by Reynold Brown
- Directed by: Roger Corman
- Written by: Charles B. Griffith; Uncredited: Peter Bogdanovich
- Produced by: Roger Corman
- Starring: Peter Fonda; Nancy Sinatra; Bruce Dern; Diane Ladd
- Cinematography: Richard Moore
- Edited by: Monte Hellman
- Music by: Mike Curb
- Production company: American International Pictures
- Distributed by: American International Pictures
- Release date: July 20, 1966
- Running time: 93 minutes
- Country: United States
- Language: English
- Budget: $360,000
- Box office: $15.54 million

The Wild Angels is a 1966 American independent outlaw biker film produced and directed by Roger Corman. Made on location in Southern California, The Wild Angels was the first film to associate actor Peter Fonda with Harley-Davidson motorcycles and 1960s counterculture. It inspired the biker film genre that continued into the early 1970s.

The Wild Angels, released by American International Pictures (AIP), stars Fonda as the fictitious Hells Angels San Pedro, California chapter president "Heavenly Blues" (or "Blues"), Nancy Sinatra as his girlfriend "Mike", Bruce Dern as doomed fellow outlaw "the Loser", and Dern's then real-life wife Diane Ladd as the Loser's on-screen old lady, "Gaysh".

Small supporting roles are played by Michael J. Pollard and Gayle Hunnicutt and, according to literature promoting the film, members of the Hells Angels from Venice, California. Members of the Coffin Cheaters motorcycle club also appeared.

In 1967 AIP followed this film with Devil's Angels, The Glory Stompers with Dennis Hopper, and The Born Losers.

== Plot ==
Heavenly Blues is the leader of the Angels motorcycle gang from San Pedro, California. Loser (or "the Loser") is his best friend.

Loser has his motorcycle stolen, and in between sprees of sex, drugs, rock and roll, booze, loud revving Harley chopper motorcycle engines, bongo drums and fights, the Angels ride out to Mecca, California in the desert to look for the motorcycle. Loser finds a brake pedal, which he says is a piece of his motorcycle, in a garage that is the hang-out of a Mexican group. The two groups brawl, with the Angels apparently winning. The police arrive and the Angels escape but Loser gets separated from the others and is left behind. He steals a police motorcycle but eventually one of the officers shoots Loser in the back, putting him in the hospital.

Blues leads a small group of Angels to sneak Loser out of the hospital. A nurse hears a noise and comes into the hospital room. One of the Angels assaults her. Blues pulls the Angel away, forcing him to stop. The nurse, having seen Blues, identifies him to the police. The Angels take Loser to a biker bar and safe house run by 'Momma', a friend of the gang, but without proper medical care, Loser dies.

The Angels forge a death certificate for Loser and arrange for a church funeral in Sequoia Grove, Loser's rural hometown. The Angels arrive at the church and carry in Loser's casket which is draped with a Nazi flag.

The funeral preacher arrives at the church and starts the funeral sermon, a eulogy consisting entirely of funeral oratory cliches which angers Blues and he interrupts the preacher and the Angels decide to have a party in the church, with alcohol, dancing and reckless destruction of the church fixtures. They remove Loser from his coffin, they sit him up as a guest of honor and place a joint in his mouth. They beat and tie up the preacher and put him into the casket. Gaysh, the Loser's girlfriend, is drugged and raped by several members of the gang. Blues has sex with Momma, while Mike, Blues' girlfriend, is kissed by another biker until Blues confronts them and punches him. Blues then tells his gang that it is time to bury Loser.

The Angels move through the town in a funeral procession to the Sequoia Grove Cemetery, where the townspeople show up outside the gate and provoke a brawl between the Angels and the townspeople. Police sirens are heard approaching in the background. Everyone scatters, the Angels mounting their bikes, and Mike begs him to leave but he tells her to get on the bike of another member of the gang and go. Blues, left alone in the graveyard, slowly begins shoveling dirt into the open grave to bury his friend Loser.

== Cast ==
- Peter Fonda as "Heavenly Blues"
- Nancy Sinatra as "Mike"
- Bruce Dern as Joe "Loser" Kearns
- Diane Ladd as "Gaysh"
- Buck Taylor as "Dear John"
- Norman Alden as Medic
- Michael J. Pollard as "Pigmy"
- Joan Shawlee as Momma Monahan
- Frank Maxwell as Preacher
- Gayle Hunnicutt as Suzie
- Dick Miller as Rigger
- Marc Cavell as "Frankenstein"

== Production ==
=== Writing ===
He was very worried that his daughter was in a film with the Hells Angels. And for some reason he didn’t want to bring it up to me, so he arranged to meet with my second assistant director, Paul Rapp, and said, “Is Nancy going to be all right?” And Paul, we had never even thought about it, but Paul made up a whole lot of nonsense, just, “Well, we’ve got people there, we’re going to be protecting her all the time.” It was all just talk, but Frank accepted it, and Nancy was great.
– Roger Corman on Frank Sinatra, 2017

Roger Corman became interested in making a film about the Hells Angels after seeing a photo of a biker funeral in the January 1966 issue of Life magazine. Corman approached AIP, Charles B. Griffith was hired to write a screenplay. Griffith's first draft was a near-silent movie which contrasted the bikers with the story of a police motorcycle cop. Corman did not like it and had Griffith rewrite it. Corman still was not happy and gave it to Peter Bogdanovich to rewrite. Bogdanovich had met Corman socially and agreed to write an adventure script in the vein of Lawrence of Arabia or Bridge on the River Kwai "only cheap"; Corman pulled Bogdanovich off that project and paid him $300 to work on Wild Angels. Bogdanovich later estimated he rewrote 80% of the script. He later directed second unit and did various other odd jobs. Corman claims the entire script was based on stories the Hells Angels recounted to them, "even though I think they embellished some of their stories."

To research the movie, Corman sponsored parties for the Hells Angels and attended the parties along with Griffith to take notes, according to Corman: “We went through a whole series of Hells Angels parties. We would buy them marijuana and beer — their essentials. They didn’t take any drugs other than marijuana then, and they didn’t seem to drink whiskey. Beer and marijuana was their trip. And they would tell us these stories of sexual action, fights, raids with other gangs."

=== Casting ===
George Chakiris and Peter Fonda were originally cast in the lead roles. However Chakiris could not ride a motorcycle so he was replaced by Fonda; with Bruce Dern taking Fonda's original role.

Nancy Sinatra, who was cast as "Mike", recalled:

When I was doing Wild Angels, Peter Fonda was talking about LSD and said, "Come on, Nancy, you should try it, it's great - I just woke up on the shelf of the linen closet." And I said, "What? Are you crazy? No thanks." I was the square peg in the round hole, I guess.

== Release ==
Corman took risks with this subject matter and the Charles B. Griffith–authored screenplay, without being overly graphic, paid dividends commercially: The Wild Angels earned $7 million in theatrical rentals in the United States and Canada, the highest-grossing low-budget film at the time.

The film had admissions in France of 531,240 people.

The movie's success established Fonda as "a counter culture film star". During the film's run in theaters, Fonda was charged with possession of marijuana, and later recalled:

Simultaneously, I was in the front pages of newspapers being arrested for possession. It was a very strange chain of events. Roger put me on the screen as a cult hero. AIP then marketed posters of me worldwide showing me on my cycle taking a toke. And the Los Angeles police put me in the headlines, causing all the disenfranchised youth of the country, who were all popping their zits at that time, to notice me.

== Reception and legacy ==
It opened the Venice Film Festival in 1966 and was received with "astonishment and moral disapproval". In a 2009 interview, Corman told Mick Garris that the US State Department tried to prevent the film from being shown in Venice on the grounds that it "did not show America the way it is", but the film was shown there anyway. The film holds a 63% "Fresh" rating on Rotten Tomatoes based on 19 reviews.

Motion Picture Exhibitor wrote, "Much of what goes on here is revolting and repulsive, and ordinary filmgoers will probably react along those lines. On the other hand, there may be some teenagers who will clasp this release to their restive bosoms and proclaim this as their "in" or "protest" symbol. For them, it may become the film to see. The reaction could be quite raucous... Word-of-mouth it will certainly engender, but whether good or bad depends upon the outlook and the taste of individuals attending.

Bosley Crowther of The New York Times wrote, "This is the brutal little picture about a California motorcycle gang and its violent depredations... It is an embarrassment all right—a vicious account of the boozing, fighting, "pot"-smoking, vandalizing and raping done by a gang of "sickle riders" who are obviously drawn to represent the swastika-wearing Hell's Angels, one of several disreputable gangs on the West Coast. And despite an implausible ending and some rather amateurish acting by Peter Fonda and Nancy Sinatra in the leading roles, it gives a pretty good picture of what these militant motorcycle-cult gangs are."

Joan Didion said of the film, "There on the screen was some news I was not getting from The New York Times. I began to think I was seeing ideograms of the future." It was "a kind of underground folk literature for adolescents" that "located an audience and fabricated a myth to exactly express that audience's every inchoate resentment, every yearning for the extreme exhilaration of death."

While promoting another of his 1960s counterculture movies, The Trip (1967), and autographing a movie still from The Wild Angels depicting Bruce Dern and him sharing one motorcycle, Fonda conceived the film Easy Rider.

Edited samples of dialogue from the film, from the scene where Fonda's character Blues explains his attitude toward life to the preacher at Loser's funeral ("We wanna be free. We wanna be free to do what we wanna do. And we wanna get loaded."), were used at the start of Mudhoney's 1989 track "In 'n' Out of Grace" (from Superfuzz Bigmuff), Primal Scream's 1990 single "Loaded" (from Screamadelica) and Eris Drew's 2021 track "Ride Free". Audio of Fonda's speech was also sampled repeatedly in the Edgar Wright film The World's End (2013), as well as repeated by Simon Pegg's character Gary King at the end of the movie. An excerpt of the audio was also featured in the launch trailer for the video game Need for Speed (2015).

Actress Laura Dern was conceived by her parents (Bruce Dern and Diane Ladd) while they were shooting this film.

== Home media ==
The Wild Angels was released to DVD by MGM Home Video on April 1, 2003 as a Region 1 widescreen DVD as a double feature with Hell's Belles, on September 11, 2007 as part of The Roger Corman Collection (movie number seven of a set of eight), and to Blu-ray by Olive Films (under license from MGM) on February 17, 2015.

== See also ==
- List of American films of 1966
- List of biker films
- Exploitation film
- Outlaw biker film
