= Army Surgeon =

1942 film by A. Edward Sutherland

- Theatrical release poster
- Directed by: A. Edward Sutherland
- Written by: Barry Trivers; Emmet Lavery
- Story by: John Twist
- Produced by: Bert Gilroy
- Starring: James Ellison; Jane Wyatt; Kent Taylor
- Cinematography: Russell Metty
- Edited by: Samuel E. Beetley
- Music by: Roy Webb
- Distributed by: RKO Radio Pictures
- Release date: December 4, 1942 (U.S.)
- Running time: 63 min.
- Country: United States
- Language: English

Army Surgeon is a 1942 American war drama film film directed by A. Edward Sutherland and starring Jane Wyatt and Kent Taylor. The plot is about a female surgeon who pretends to be a nurse so she can serve on the front line during World War I.

== Plot ==
Dr. Elizabeth Ainsley is in her cabin on a military boat. While going through an old box she comes across an old photo of her and two men dated 1917. She gets off the boat in France where it is revealed she has lied about her occupation so that she can be assigned as a nurse to a WWI French army hospital to work alongside Capt. James 'Jim' Mason.

When Dr. Ainsley arrives she finds that Dr. Mason does not understand why they sent her there because he had asked for a male nurse. She replies that it is routine and says that she is trained in shrapnel and the brain. When some wounded men come in Dr. Mason tells her to get ready and he also says he will find out if she knows anything or not. Several scenes show them working well together with her still posing as a nurse. Dr. Mason is disappointed that they are not able to save more lives and she reassures him that they are doing their best and it is not his fault. That night she is having a nightmare and he wakes her up and also reveals that he knows she is a doctor but will not report her.

Dr. Mason wants to establish a hospital at the front lines but Col. John Wishart won't let him due to Army regulations. Doctor Ainsley convinces him to let Dr. Mason establish a hospital but not to let Dr. Mason know they have talked.

Dr. Mason tells them to pack their belongings because he reassigned to the front lines. When they get there they start to get more victims than they can handle. One day Dr. Mason and Dr. Ainsley are working in the vegetable garden when enemy planes fly over but an American plane comes out of nowhere and starts to shoot them down. But before he can get them all he is shot down. Dr. Ainsley and Dr. Mason run to his aid and get him out of the plane alive at which time Dr. Ainsley recognizes him as Lt. Philip 'Phil' Harvey who she had a previous relationship. Dr. Ainsley tells Dr. Mason that Lt. Harvey is nothing to her and there is nothing between them. Dr. Drake (Walter Reed) tells Dr.Mason he is jealous. Lt. Harvey tries to revive their romance and she discourages them. While he is kissing her against her will Dr. Mason walks in on them and tells Lt. Harvey he is recommending that he is ready to return to active duty.

At Christmas they find the best tree they can find and decorate it. The patients and staff give Dr Ainsley a homemade present for their gratitude and as she is thanking them when a man walks in and says special delivery by airplane for Miss Ainsley and it is flowers that Lt. Harvey dropped for her. This irritates Dr. Mason and she changes the subject by playing Christmas music and they exchange a loving look. The festivities are interrupted by an influx of casualties and Dr. Drake is killed.

One day on her way to take papers to Col. John Wishart she lets it slip that she had spoken to him about being reassigned to the front and Dr. Mason is not happy about it. On her way out a Major orders her to take a leave and she runs into Lt. Harvey and they decide to go to lunch. Lt. Harvey gets to the cafe first and findsd Dr. Mason playing the piano. Lt. Harvey tells him to get out and Dr.Mason tells Harvey that if he wants to fight there is an alley out back. Harvey tells Dr. Mason that if he wins he can have Miss Ainsley but Dr. Mason says Ainsley means nothing to him and he is just fighting a war. Dr. Ainsley overhears and says, "Never mind, Phil, it is not fair to take up any more of the Captain's time". They go on a hayride and Dr. Ainsley tells Lt. Harvey she is not interested in reviving their romance. They are then contacted that they need to get back to the front.

Once there, Dr. Mason tells them they are being evacuated and tells Dr. Ainsley to leave with the rest of them but she refuses. He picks her up to carry her out to a car when a hill of dirt caves in trapping them and Lt. Harvey along with several patients. Mason and Harvey eventually dig their way out only to find that they are behind enemy lines. They flip a coin to see who will go for help and Dr. Mason wins only to get shot and brought back into the hut. Their aide, Brooklyn shows up and tells them that the army has driven the enemy back. While in the hospital, Dr. Mason, Dr. Ainsley, and Lt. Harvey all hold hands.

Flash back to the present and Dr. Mason walks into the cabin indicating that they are married and he sees her holding a picture of the three of them. He says that the picture reminds him of a letter he forgot about that is from Harvey. She opens it and reads from Harvey: "Now don't tell me I have gotta go through all that again." and in the note it says that he is now married.

== Cast ==
- James Ellison as Capt. James 'Jim' Mason
- Jane Wyatt as Dr. Elizabeth 'Beth' Ainsley
- Kent Taylor as Lt. Philip 'Phil' Harvey
- Walter Reed as Dr. Bill Drake
- James Burke as Brooklyn
- George Cleveland as Col. John Wishart
- Lee Bonnell as Ramsey

== Reception ==
According to RKO records, the film made a loss of $46,000.
