= I'm Still Alive (film) =

- Theatrical release poster
- Directed by: Irving Reis
- Screenplay by: Edmund H. North
- Story by: Edmund H. North
- Produced by: Frederic Ullman Jr.
- Starring: Kent Taylor; Linda Hayes; Howard Da Silva; Ralph Morgan; Don Dillaway
- Cinematography: J. Roy Hunt
- Edited by: Theron Warth
- Music by: Roy Webb
- Production company: RKO Pictures
- Distributed by: RKO Pictures
- Release date: September 20, 1940
- Running time: 72 minutes
- Country: United States
- Language: English

I'm Still Alive is a 1940 American drama film directed by Irving Reis and written by Edmund H. North. The film stars Kent Taylor, Linda Hayes, Howard Da Silva, Ralph Morgan and Don Dillaway. The film was released on September 20, 1940, by RKO Pictures.

== Plot ==
The plot was based on, the well-known, at the time, marriage of Hollywood starlet Helen Twelvetrees and stuntman Jack Woody.

A spat on a Hollywood set between stuntman Steve Bennett and actress Laura Marley leads to the two of them falling in love and being married. Steve's work is dangerous and Laura persuades him to quit, but he has difficulty finding a different occupation.

When youthful former colleague Tommy Briggs has a complicated stunt to do, Steve volunteers to take his place, then after being rejected by producer Walter Blake is devastated when Tommy is killed. Steve leaves to become a barnstorming pilot. Blake schemes to lure Steve back for Laura's sake by inventing a romance between her and stuntman Red Garvey. When he returns, Steve ends up involved in yet another life-threatening stunt. He barely survives, but Laura is happy to have him back.

== Cast ==
- Kent Taylor as Steve Bennett
- Linda Hayes as Laura Marley
- Howard Da Silva as Red Garvey
- Ralph Morgan as Walter Blake
- Don Dillaway as Tommy Briggs
- Clay Clement as Roger
- Fred Niblo as Fred
- Skippy as Skippy
