= Satan's Sadists =

- Directed by: Al Adamson
- Screenplay by: Dennis Wayne
- Produced by: Al Adamson; Sam Sherman
- Starring: Russ Tamblyn; Kent Taylor; Scott Brady
- Cinematography: Gary Graver
- Edited by: Gary Graver
- Music by: Harley Hatcher
- Production company: Kennis-Frazer Films
- Distributed by: Independent-International Pictures Corp.
- Release date: June 1969
- Running time: 86 minutes
- Country: United States
- Language: English
- Budget: $50,000
- Box office: Between $700 thousand and $20 million

Satan's Sadists is a 1969 American outlaw biker film directed by Al Adamson and starring Russ Tamblyn.

== Plot ==
The plot centers around an outlaw motorcycle gang called the "Satans", who roam the deserts of the Southwestern United States. The gang's leader goes by the name of Anchor, and other members include Firewater, Acid, Muscle, Willie, Romeo and Gina. The gang comes upon two lovers whom they proceed to attack: they beat up the boyfriend and rape the girl. After the assaults, they kill both of them and throw their car, with them in it, over a cliff.

Johnny Martin, a Vietnam veteran U.S. Marine, is hitchhiking and is picked up by former police officer Chuck Baldwin and his wife Nora. Johnny was a Military Police officer in the Marine Corps and after his discharge he's moving to Los Angeles to "live a little". Tracy, a waitress, drives up a red dune buggy to a diner where she works. Tracy is late and explains to her boss, Lew, that she was late because she was studying for a college class. Nora spots the cafe and tells her husband and Johnny that they should go eat there. Johnny sits alone at the bar while Chuck and Nora sit at a table, thinking the Marine is being antisocial. Lew and Chuck small talk about the desert area and its isolation. Johnny meets Tracy and they both talk about getting away from the desert town.

The Satans arrive at the cafe and demand service. Romeo harasses Tracy as she tries to take the gang's order. Lew intervenes and the gang calms down. Firewater selects a song from the jukebox and Gina performs a go-go dance routine for Anchor, jealous of Anchor's attention towards the waitress. Lou pulls the plug on the jukebox and tells the gang that the place is "a place to eat" and "not a place to dance." One of the bikers hits on Chuck's wife and she throws a drink in his face. Chuck pulls out his revolver and tells them to "beat it." The bikers knock out Chuck and take his gun. The Satans take Lew, Chuck and Nora out behind the cafe. Nora is raped, and Anchor explains to them why they hate cops. Anchor kills the three of them as Johnny and Tracy escape in Tracy's dune buggy after knocking out Muscle and Romeo.

The bikers pursue Johnny and Tracy deep into the isolated desert. The dune buggy breaks down from damage that occurred when the couple ran over a couple of the bikes. Johnny and Tracy trek through the desert in an effort to reach help at the closest town before the Satans catch up with them and finish the job. The remains of the gang comes across a trio of female campers − Carol, Jan, and Lois − and party with them. Gina drives off in a jealous fit and commits suicide by driving over a cliff, dying with Anchor's name on her lips. Willie tracks Johnny and Tracy but is bitten by a rattlesnake and dies. Firewater goes looking for Willie and finds his body - he returns to discover Acid playing Russian roulette with Chuck's pistol and Anchor has gone insane and murdered the three women. They fight and Firewater leaves Anchor for dead; he searches for Johnny and Tracy. When he finds the couple, Johnny surprises him and during the fight, a landslide crushes Firewater. He tells Johnny that Anchor is no longer a problem and dies.

As the couple relax and begin walking down the road, Anchor drives toward them on the last working gang motorcycle. He raves about being Satan and having paid his dues; it is Johnny's turn. As he raises the gun, Johnny throws a switchblade at the gang leader, killing him. Johnny is wounded but still able to drive the motorcycle; the couple get on the bike and leave towards the setting sun.

== Cast ==
- Russ Tamblyn as Anchor
- Scott Brady as Charlie Baldwin
- John Cardos as Firewater
- Robert Dix as Willie
- Gary Kent as Johnny Martin
- Greydon Clark as Acid
- Kent Taylor as Lew
- Regina Carrol as Gina
- Jacqueline Cole as Tracy
- William Bonner as Muscle
- Bobby Clark as Romeo
- Evelyn Frank as Nora Baldwin
- Yvonne Stewart as Carol
- Cheryl Anne as Jan
- Bambi Allen as Lois

== Production ==
It was the first film from Independent International, a company of Al Adamson and Sam Sherman formed after the collapse of a project Adamson was going to film in Spain, The Unavanged with Robert Taylor. When financing did not come through, Adamson had to come up with another project quickly. Overnight he wrote a 20 page treatment for Satan's Sadists. Adamson recalled:

We made a picture that would be saleable and we wanted to put things in it that would jolt the audience. We wanted to put some things in there that were different. Our goal was to make the best film we could make for the amount of money we had to spend and put it out and hope it was a success and we accomplished all those things.

According to the Independent Film Journal, Satan's Sadists was made for under $125,000. By comparison, Adamson said most of his films had budgets between $200,000 and $500,000.

Adamson and actress Regina Carrol first met when she was cast in the film; the two were later married.

Adamson says Russ Tamblyn was recommended to him and he "let him have his head. I let him do a lot of things improv and he appreciated that. That was the kind of actor he was and wanted to be and they wouldn't allow him to do it in some places like television and places like that. So here he was able to be creative and the two of us working together we were able to capture something that wouldn't necessarily be standard fare." The two would go on to make several films together.

After completing Satan's Sadists, Adamson and Sherman developed a follow-up of sorts called The Blood Seekers, also starring Russ Tamblyn, though this time with a horror angle. That film was eventually deemed unsatisfying so the filmmakers shot new material, reducing Tamblyn's role and making the horror elements more prominent. It was released in 1971 as Dracula vs. Frankenstein.

== Release ==
Satan's Sadists was released in June 1969 in Southern and Midwestern locations of the United States. It was distributed by Independent-International Pictures Corp. It was later released in Los Angeles in May 1970 and in New York in January 1971. It was double billed in some regions with another film directed by Adamson: Hell's Bloody Devils. Unlike the industry standard of making about 200 prints of films, Independent-International made less than 75 prints and played them regionally. By March 1971, Boxoffice reported that the film had grossed over $1,200,000.

The film was released on DVD on January 8, 2010 as part of the Stephen Romano Presents Shock Festival compilation. On February 23, 2010, a Region 0 DVD of the movie was released by Alpha Video.

== Reception ==
From contemporary reviews, Variety dismissed the film as a "sickie quickie and its vulgarities are many" A reviewer in the Daily Mirror called it a "Hunk of hideous junk" and that they wouldn't see another Adamson film alone, believing that "someone might come in to the theatre who actually-dug-this stuff." The Hollywood Reporter continued the trend of dismissing the film, calling it an "inane freaky feature".

Sam Sherman recalled the film was "a great mix of genres— it had violence, it had sex, it had great music, it had good people in it. It always played well to an audience and it helped start the company, so I have a sentimental attachment to it."

== See also ==
- List of American films of 1969
- Outlaw biker film
- List of biker films
- Exploitation film
