= The Black Klansman =

1966 American film

- Promotional release poster
- Directed by: Ted V. Mikels
- Screenplay by: Art Names; John T. Wilson
- Produced by: Ted V. Mikels; Joe Solomon
- Starring: Richard Gilden; Rima Kutner; Harry Lovejoy; Max Julien; Jakie Deslonde; James McEachin
- Cinematography: Robert Caramico
- Edited by: Ted V. Mikels
- Music by: Jaime Mendoza-Nava
- Release date: 1966
- Running time: 88 minutes
- Country: United States

The Black Klansman, originally released in 1966 under the name I Crossed the Color Line, is a low-budget feature film directed by Ted V. Mikels and starring Richard Gilden, Rima Kutner, Harry Lovejoy, Max Julien, Jakie Deslonde, and James McEachin.

== Plot ==
During the civil rights movement, a light-skinned African-American man, Jerry Ellworth (Richard Gilden, a white actor), is a Los Angeles jazz musician with a white girlfriend, Andrea (Rima Kutner). Meanwhile, in a Turnersville, Alabama diner, a young black man, Delbert Madison (Kirk Kirksey), attempts to exercise his civil rights, which has just passed at the federal level, by sitting at a local diner, where he is observed by members of the Ku Klux Klan, including Exalted Cyclops Rook (Harry Lovejoy). By night and in Klan robes, they shoot Delbert and firebomb a church, killing Jerry's daughter by his deceased wife. By way of revenge, Jerry moves to Alabama to infiltrate the group responsible for his daughter's death. Andrea and their saxophonist, Lonnie (James McEachin), go to Turnerville out of concern for Jerry, who went crazy and tried to choke Andrea on learning of his daughter's death. Jerry dons his disguise and becomes a member of the inner circle, befriending the local leader and his daughter, Carole Ann, and soon exacts his revenge. When Andrea and Lonnie, their saxophonist, arrive in town, Farley (Jakie Deslonde), Delbert's older brother, hires two Harlem hitmen, Raymond Estes (Max Julien) and his burly assistant, Barnaby (Jimmy Robinson), to avenge his brother's death despite the protests of the reverend and Alex (Whitman Mayo), owner of the only black tavern and inn where Lonnie and Andrea stay. Infiltrating the Klan, Jerry and Carole Ann make love in her car. Raymond and Barnaby attack and bind Lonnie to make it look like he is in an interracial relationship with Andrea in order to set them up as lynch bait for the Klansmen, but end up getting lynched themselves in the climax, when Jerry reveals himself to Rook, who kneels down and begs for mercy as a trap. Rook, after pulling away the truck on which noosed Raymond and Barnaby are standing, runs over Jerry's hand and tries repeatedly to mow him down until Jerry shoots him. In the end, Jerry meets Farley and decides to stay in Turnersville and help out. Mayor Buckley (Byrd Holland) tells Jerry that he wishes he had done something earlier about the racial hatred in his town.

== Cast ==
- Richard Gilden as Jerry Ellsworth
- Rima Kutner as Andrea
- Harry Lovejoy as Rook
- Max Julien as Raymond
- Jakie Deslonde as Farley
- James McEachin as Lonnie
- Maureen Gaffney as Carole Ann
- W. McLennard as Wallace
- Ginode Augustino as Sawyer
- R.L. Armstrong as Jenkins
- Byrd Holland as Buckley
- Whitman Mayo as Alex
- Frances E. Williams as Ellie Madison
- Ray Dannis as Sloane
- William Collins as Deputy
- Kirk Kirksey as Delbert
- Jimmy Robinson as Barnaby
- Anita Hurrel as Mrs. Ellsworth
- Gary Kent as Wilkins

== Production ==
Mikels says he told Joe Solomon that he would not make the film "if I couldn't make some good out of it. If we couldn't justify everything and bring about a union of understanding between black and white and come to a conclusion that would leave people saying, ‘Well, we better learn to get along, or else.’ If I couldn't do that, I wouldn't make the movie, so I won out there."

The title song, written and performed by Tony Harris, was released as a single. It has been noted for having a similar melody to "Home of the Brave" by Barry Mann and Cynthia Weil, which was recorded by Bonnie and the Treasures in July 1965 and Jody Miller in August 1965. Miller's version hit the Billboard chart at #25, while the Bonnie and the Treasures version peaked at #77. An acetate demo by The Ronettes has also been found.

== See also ==
- List of American films of 1966
