= She-Devils on Wheels =

1968 film by Herschell Gordon Lewis

- Theatrical release poster
- Directed by: Herschell Gordon Lewis
- Written by: Herschell Gordon Lewis (as Allison Louise Downe)
- Story by: Fred M. Sandy
- Produced by: Herschell Gordon Lewis
- Starring: Betty Connell; Nancy Lee Noble; Christie Wagner
- Cinematography: Roy Collodi
- Edited by: Richard Brinkman
- Music by: Larry Wellington
- Production company: Mayflower Pictures
- Distributed by: Mayflower Pictures
- Release date: May 7, 1968
- Running time: 82 minutes
- Country: United States
- Language: English
- Budget: $50,000 (estimated)

She-Devils on Wheels is a 1968 American exploitation biker film about an all-female motorcycle gang called The Man-Eaters, directed and produced by Herschell Gordon Lewis. Actual female motorcycle club members from the Iron Cross motorcycle club's Cut-Throats Division were cast for the film.

== Plot ==
The film opens with Karen, a young woman leaving her mother's house after a visit. She drives her car to a local garage where she trades it with a motorcycle and changes out of her sun dress into street clothes (blue jeans, a T-shirt, and a green fabric vest with an image of a pink cat head and the words "MAN-EATERS" on the back). Karen re-joins her real friends that she has apparently kept secret from her mother; Karen is a member of an all-female motorcycle gang called the Man-Eaters. The Man-Eaters hang out in an abandoned house and hold weekly motorcycle races at an abandoned airport runway. The leader of the Man-Eaters, the tough-minded Queen, holds the races and the winner of each race gets first pick from the "stud line".

The race begins and Karen is the winner, with Queen coming in second. Nevertheless, Queen is a good sport and allows Karen to pick first. On this particular day, Queen and the rest of the Man-Eaters return to their hideout where a group of young men have also arrived, whom are male groupies to the all-women gang. Karen picks out her usual "stud", a friendly guy named Bill whom she has picked for four weeks in a row. However, this is strictly forbidden among the Man-Eaters for according to their code, no Man-Eaters is allowed to be attached to anyone or anything but the gang. One of the fastest held rules of the group is that "all men are mothers" and no Man-Eaters falls in love.

Honey Pot, a teenage "mascot" and follower of the Man-Eaters who wants to join, reports to Queen her suspicions about Karen's attraction to Bill. After debating about it with her fellow members, Queen tells Honey Pot to inform Karen that she is to come to the runway that evening. When Karen shows up as expected, Queen and the rest of the gang angrily decrees to her a punishing ultimatum, Karen is to participate in the beating then dragging of Bill or face expulsion from the gang. Karen gets on her motorcycle and is forced to drag Bill, who is tied, beaten, and bruised behind her down the entire stretch of the runway and back. Bill is dead after this, and Karen's allegiance and loyalty to the gang is proven.

Another evening later, Honey Pot is finally granted membership into the gang. In a hazing ritual, Honey Pot has her left hand cut open in a blood oath and made to kiss all the members of the gang to prove her sisterhood. Next, Honey Pot is stripped to her underwear and doused in honey and chocolate syrup and made to entertain the entire "stud line". Following this, Honey Pot is cleaned off, is given a leather jacket with the Man-Eaters logo stamped on the back like the rest of the members and is formally initiated into the gang.

The next day, the gang rides into the small Florida town of Medley and terrorizes and harasses the locals by riding their motorcycles through parking lots, through storefronts, and around the front and back lawns of houses. When their antics are stopped by the local police, the townspeople (out of fear of retaliation) refuse to press charges. As a result, the police make no successful arrests. Unable to pin anything on the Man-Eaters, the police are forced to let them go, only giving Queen and the rest of the Man-Eaters a warning to stay out of trouble.

Another week later, the stud line competition is again on, and Queen and the rest of the Man-Eaters head off to the runway for another motorcycle race only to discover that an all-male gang are hanging out along the runway. What was supposed to be a fun-spirited race turns into an all-out brawl. Queen and the leader of the male gang, named Joe Boy, fight each other with knives, which leads to a full fight between the sex-crazed nymphs and their macho rivals which ends with the Man-Eaters being victorious.

Ted, an old boyfriend of Karen's, manages to track her down and privately beseeches her to leave the Man-Eaters and return to normal life, either with or without him. Karen wavers, pleading that she is in too deep with the gang for any redemption and that he should forget about her. Refusing to give up on Karen, Ted infiltrates the "stud line" posing as one of the ruffians. After the race, where Queen emerges victorious, she gets first pick, but chooses another guy... unaware about Ted's identity, which Karen recognizes. Karen picks Ted and they go to chat in a nearby bedroom while a full-on orgy between the Man-Eaters and their guy followers happens in the main living room. Ted informs Karen that he heard through the grapevine that Joe Boy and his gang are out for blood after their humiliating beating by the Man-Eaters.

Among all this, Honey Pot steps outside the building for some fresh air and is waylaid by the spineless male gang. The next morning, the male gang returns Honey Pot back to the Man-Eaters' hideout and flee. All of the ladies, including Queen, are horrified by Honey Pot's appearance of her bruised face which is covered in blood, as well as a large ring literally nailed through her nose. Also with the near-dead Honey Pot is a note from Joe Boy threatening the Man-Eaters with further retribution should they start another brawl with them.

After dropping off Honey Pot at a local hospital, Queen and the rest of the Man-Eaters head out in search of Honey Pot's assailants, including Joe Boy. The vigilante girls first head to a bar where Joe Boy is said to hang out at. The bartender refuses to disclose any information about Joe Boy's whereabouts and he gets severely beaten by the angry gang leader. Queen customizes the bartender's face with her trademark bike chain belt.

Two of the Man-Eaters, Whitey and Terry, spot Joe Boy and some of his gang at a local restaurant and report back to Queen, who arranges an ambush. Whitey and Terry return to the restaurant where they slash the tires of Joe Boy's car. When Joe Boy confronts them, Whitey sprays bug spray into Joe Boy's face and she and Terry take off on one motorcycle. Joe Boy takes Terry's motorcycle and gives chase.

However, this is all part of Queen's plan as she, always on top of the situation, had told Whitey and Terry to initiate a confrontation that will engage Joe Boy in a pursuit. As planned, Joe Boy follows Whitey and Terry along a road where Queen, Karen, Supergirl, Ginger, Delta, and the rest of the Man-Eaters lie in wait. Queen and the gang string along the road a nearly invisible wire. Whitey and Terry stop short, but Joe Boy unwittingly forges ahead and is literally decapitated by the wire, and his severed head goes flying. Exalted, Queen drops her trademark belt beside Joe Boy's headless corpse.

Afterwards, Ted approaches Karen one final time to persuade her to abandon the gang. Predictably, Karen again refuses and rides off with Queen and the rest of the Man-Eaters as they pack up from their hideout and ride out of town, leaving Ted alone and bewildered. Before riding out of Medley for any other town to hide out in and terrorize, Queen and the gang return to the scene of the crime to retrieve her chain belt that she left by Joe Boy's corpse only to find the town's entire police force there waiting for them. Threatened at gunpoint, Queen and all of the Man-Eaters are arrested for Joe Boy's murder.

In one of the first known examples of a post-credits scene, it is revealed that, with only circumstantial but no concrete evidence, the police are forced to release the leader of the Man-Eaters. Queen rejoins her gang waiting for her outside the town's jail and they all ride out of town for places unknown.

== Cast ==
- Betty Connell as Queen
- Nancy Lee Noble as Honey Pot
- Christie Wagner as Karen
- Rodney Bedell as Ted
- Pat Poston as Whitey
- Jody Pennock as Terry (credited as Ruby Tuesday)
- John Weymer as Joe Boy
- Joani Kramer as the Russian
- Donna Stelzer as Supergirl
- Roz Cohen as Delta
- Donna Testa as Poodle
- Laura Platz as Mac
- Sharon Brown as Ginger Snap
- Robert Wood as Rocky
- David Harris as Bill
- Steve White as Doodle
- Leslie Sharoff as Muscles
- John Shackleford as policeman
- John Chaffin as policeman
- Rick Williams as outlaw
- Roy Collodi as the bartender
- Robert Lennard as highway patrol
- Robert Morrison as stud #1
- James Madalia as stud #2
- Rocky Williams as stud #3
- Lourdes Artique as waitress
- Toni Newsholme as Karen's mother

== Critical reception ==
In his review of the film, critic Jeffrey Kauffman wrote that "[f]or jaded modern day viewers, a lot of the depictions are going to seem quaint at best and pretty comedic at worst," adding that "a couple of immolations [...] securely link the film to some of Lewis' other splatter-fests."

Writing in Eye for Film, critic Jennie Kermode wrote that although "the bikers themselves are authentic [...] [w]hat they can't do is act," and that the film "may lack the leather and lesbianism usually associated with the subgenre but She-Devils On Wheels has no shortage of camp."

== See also ==
- List of American films of 1968
- Outlaw biker film
- List of biker films
