= Paul Koslo =

German-Canadian actor (1944–2019)

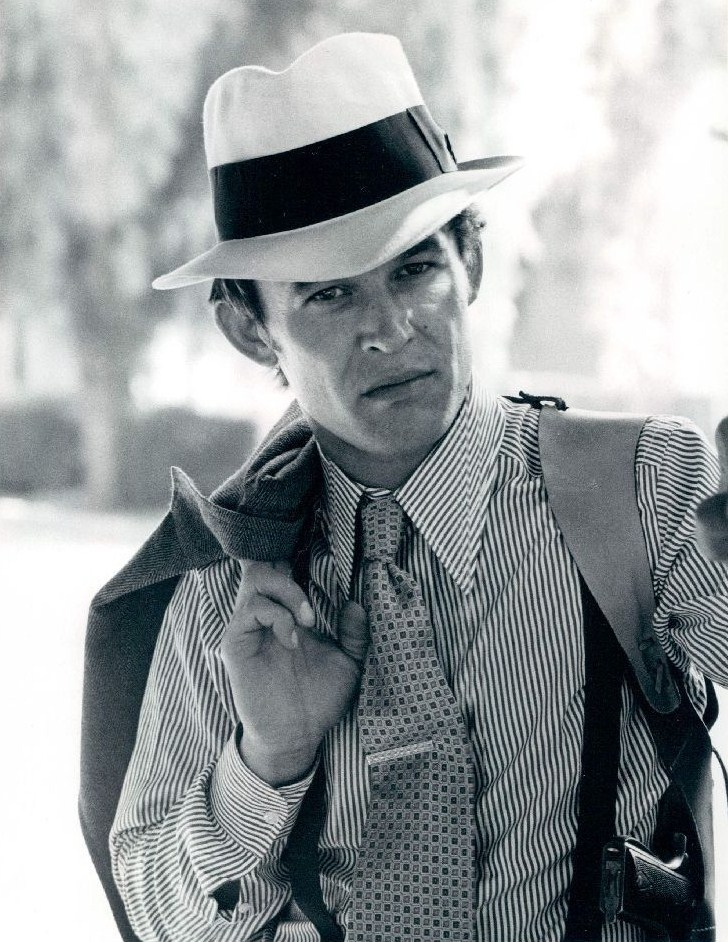
- Koslo in 1974
- Born: Manfred Koslowski; 27 June 1944; Nazi Germany
- Died: 9 January 2019 (aged 74); Lake Hughes, California, U.S.
- Education: National Theatre School of Canada (didn't graduate)
- Occupation: Actor
- Years active: 1966–2004
- Spouse: Allaire Paterson-Koslo (m. 1997)
- Children: 1

Paul Koslo (born Manfred Koslowski; June 27, 1944 – 9 January 2019) was a German-born Canadian actor.

== Early life ==
Manfred Koslowski was born on 27 June 1944 in Nazi Germany (present-day Germany) to parents of Russian and Polish descent. In the 1950s the Koslo family immigrated to Canada, living first in Regina before settling in West Vancouver.

Koslo studied at West Vancouver Secondary School before attending the National Theatre School of Canada on a Ford Foundation Scholarship, but left after a year.

== Career ==
Koslo started his career in such 1970s films as Nam's Angels a.k.a. The Losers, Vanishing Point and The Stone Killer. He also appeared opposite Charlton Heston in the science fiction film The Omega Man, in a sympathetic co-starring role. He portrayed villains in Joe Kidd (1972), Mr. Majestyk (1974), and The Drowning Pool (1975).

He and fellow Omega Man co-star Anthony Zerbe also appeared in Rooster Cogburn (1975). After a solid supporting part as a Jewish concentration camp survivor in the critically acclaimed Voyage of the Damned (1976), as well as the mayor in Heaven's Gate (1980), he began a long run of portraying villainous types in productions such as Roots: The Next Generations and The Glitter Dome. In rare, in-depth interviews with both Psychotronic Video and Shock Cinema (issue No. 14) magazines, Koslo spoke about his experiences working in several films with Charles Bronson and in The Omega Man with Heston.

Starting in the late 1970s, Koslo appeared (usually as a villain) in a string of television shows such as The Rockford Files, Mission: Impossible, Barnaby Jones, The Incredible Hulk, Quincy, M.E., Buck Rogers in the 25th Century, T. J. Hooker, The A-Team, The Fall Guy, Dallas and Hunter. In the Highway to Heaven episode "The Torch" he played a leader of the American Nazi Party. Koslo found it tough to deliver his character's often bigotry-riddled dialogue, and during the filming of a scene set at a Nazi rally the cast and crew were heckled by passers-by, since the scene was filmed on location in downtown Los Angeles with swastikas decorating the outside of a building. He also appeared as Jesse James in The Dukes of Hazzard seventh-season episode "Go West, Young Dukes".

In the 1980s, along with television appearances, he appeared in several independent action films (most of them straight-to-video). He was also in Loose Cannons (1990) and appeared as the Russian battle-robot pilot Alexander in the science fiction film Robot Jox (1990).

== Personal life ==
Koslo met his wife, Allaire Paterson, at the MET Theatre in Hollywood, when he produced a one-woman show, Purple Breasts, a critically acclaimed play she co-wrote and starred in. They married in 1997 and had one child together.

Paul Koslo lived in Lake Hughes, CA and was also the owner of The Rock Inn.

Koslo died on 9 January 2019, from pancreatic cancer at the age of 74.

== Filmography ==
=== Film ===
Year	Title	Role	Notes
1966	Julius Caesar	Cinna il cospiratore	TV movie
1969	House of Zodiac	Unknown Role	
1970	Nam's Angels (aka The Losers)	"Limpy"	
1971	Vanishing Point	Deputy Charlie Scott	
1971	Scandalous John	Pipes	
1971	The Omega Man	"Dutch"	
1971	The Birdmen	Davies	TV movie
1971	Welcome Home, Soldier Boys	Shooter	
1972	Joe Kidd	Roy	
1972	The Daughters of Joshua Cabe	Deke Wetherall	TV movie
1973	Lolly-Madonna XXX	Villum Gutshall	
1973	Cleopatra Jones	Gang Member	
1973	The Stone Killer	Langley	
1973	The Laughing Policeman	Haygood	
1974	Mr. Majestyk	Bobby Kopas	
1974	Bootleggers	Othar Pruitt	
1974	Freebie and the Bean	"Whitey"	
1975	The Drowning Pool	Candy	
1975	Rooster Cogburn	Luke	
1976	Voyage of the Damned	Aaron Pozner	
1976	Scott Free	Al	TV movie
1977	The Ransom	Victor	Also known as Assault on Paradise
1978	Tomorrow Never Comes	Willy	
1979	Love and Bullets	Huntz	
1980	Rape and Marriage: The Rideout Case	Ralph Larson	TV movie
1980	Heaven's Gate	Mayor Charlie Lezak	
1981	Inmates: A Love Story	Virgil	TV movie
1983	Kenny Rogers as The Gambler: The Adventure Continues	Holt	TV movie
1983	Hambone and Hillie	Jere	
1984	The Glitter Dome	Griswold Veals	TV movie
1985	The Annihilators	Roy "Roy Boy" Jagger	
1987	Caribe	Mercenary	
1988	A Night in the Life of Jimmy Reardon	Al Reardon	
1989	Robot Jox	Alexander	
1990	Loose Cannons	Grimmer	
1990	Xtro II: The Second Encounter	Dr. Alex Summerfield	
1990	Solar Crisis	Dr. Gunther Haas	
1991	Conagher	Kiowa Staples	TV movie
1993	Chained Heat II	Franklin Goff	
1996	Downdraft	General Devlin	TV movie
1996	Judge and Jury	Lockhart	
1999	Inferno	Ives	
2004	Y.M.I.	Intruder	
2004	Breaking the Fifth	Himself	(final film role)

=== Television ===
Year	Title	Role	Notes
1966	Festival	Raskolnikov	2 episodes
1971	Bearcats!	Billy Ray Joiner	Episode: "The Devil Wears Armor"
1971	Longstreet	Bobby Karp	Season 1, episode 7: "The Shape of Nightmares"
1972	Mission: Impossible	Ollie Shanks	Season 6, episode 20: "Double Dead"
1972	Ironside	Donald Flood	Season 5, episode 23: "His Fiddlers Three"
1974	The Manhunter	Tommy Wednesday	Season 1, episode 3: "The Baby-Faced Killers"
1974	Gunsmoke	Cory	Season 20, episode 10: "In Performance of Duty"
1974–1975	Cannon	Drake / "Ace"	2 episodes
1975	Petrocelli	Morgan	Season 2, episode 2: "Mark of Cain"
1975	Police Woman	Johnny "Sticker" Hughes	Season 2, episode 2: "The Score"
1975	Switch	Roy Moss	Season 1, episode 6: "The Man Who Couldn't Lose"
1976	Police Story	"Sleepy"	Season 4, episode 3: "Two Frogs on a Mongoose"
1976	Captains and the Kings	Rufus	Season 1, episode 8: "Chapter VIII"
1976–1979	The Rockford Files	Willie "Whispering Willie" Green / Pittson	2 episodes
1976–1979	Hawaii Five-O	Rolly / Charlie Turner	2 episodes
1977	Barnaby Jones	Tony Slayton	Season 5, episode 19: "Anatomy of Fear"
1977	Most Wanted	Jimmy	Season 1, episode 21: "The Dutchman"
1978	David Cassidy: Man Undercover	Max	Season 1, episode 4: "Deadly Convoy"
1978	Dallas	Al Parker	Season 2, episode 13: "Kidnapped"
1979	How the West Was Won	Jobe	Season 3, episode 3: "The Enemy"
1979	Roots: The Next Generations	Earl Crowther	4 episodes
1979	CHiPs	Verne	Season 2, episode 22: "Ride the Whirlwind"
1979	The Sacketts	"Kid" Newton	2 episodes
1980	Buck Rogers in the 25th Century	Commander Reeve	Episode: "A Dream of Jennifer"
1980	Galactica 1980	Billy Eheres	Season 1, episode 6: "Spaceball"
1980	Paris	Phil Storch	Season 1, episode 13: "America the Beautiful"
1980–1981	The Incredible Hulk	Doug Hewitt / Carl Rivers	2 episodes
1981	Hart to Hart	Val Rankin	Season 2, episode 12: "Murder in the Saddle"
1981	Quincy, M.E.	John Doe Killer	Season 6, episode 18: "Vigil of Fear"
1981	Nero Wolfe	Daniel Masters	Season 1, episode 14: "Sweet Revenge"
1981	The Greatest American Hero	"Bad B"	Season 2, episode 4: "Hog Wild"
1981	Today's FBI	Cooper	Season 1, episode 5: "The Fugitive"
1982	Strike Force	Randy	Season 1, episode 8: "The Outcast"
1982	Cassie & Co.	Carl Pilgrim	Season 1, episode 4: "Dark Side of the Moon"
1982	Bret Maverick	Fletcher Mayberry	Season 1, episode 11: "A Night at the Red Ox"
1982	Trapper John, M.D.	Kenny	Season 4, episode 7: "The Ransom"
1982	Gavilan	Cutter	Season 1, episode 2: "Pirates"
1983–1985	The A-Team	Tanen / Deputy Sneed	2 episodes
1984	Matt Houston	Andrew	Season 2, episode 15: "Houston Is Dead"
1984	Legmen	Len Weiner	Season 1, episode 5: "Poseidon Indenture"
1984	Blue Thunder	Johnny Irons	Season 1, episode 9: "The Long Flight"
1984	You Are the Jury	Ed Harrison	Season 1, episode 1: "The Case of the People of Florida vs. Joseph Landrum"
1984	The Paper Chase	Joe Bob Carter	Season 2, episode 11: "Burden of Proof"
1984	Jessie	Unknown Role	Season 1, episode 2: "The Lady Killer"
1984	Knight Rider	Lyle Austin	Season 3, episode 3: "The Ice Bandits"
1984	The Dukes of Hazzard	Jesse James	Episode: "Go West, Young Dukes"
1984	T. J. Hooker	Pyro	Season 4, episode 9: "The Confession"
1985	The Hitchhiker	Rico	Season 2, episode 5: "Petty Thieves"
1985	Crazy Like a Fox	Unknown Role	Season 1, episode 5: "Motor Homicide"
1985	Wildside	Sven Johnson	Season 1, episode 3: "The Crimea of the Century"
1985	Misfits of Science	Skinner	Season 1, episode 9: "Twin Engines"
1986	Highway to Heaven	Jan Baldt	Season 2, episode 21: "The Torch"
1986	MacGyver	Dr. Suvarin	Season 1, episode 21: "A Prisoner of Conscience"
1988	Falcon Crest	George Westcott	2 episodes
1988	Ohara	Ray Willard	Season 2, episode 17: "Open Season"
1988	The Highwayman	Unknown Role	Episode: "Haunted Highway"
1989	Hunter	Bass	2 episodes
1990	The Outsiders	Officer Dickey	Episode: "Pilot"
1990	Life Goes On	Farmer Jack	2 episodes
1990	The Flash	Johnny Ray Hix	Episode: "Sins of the Father"
1998	Walker, Texas Ranger	Matthew Leach	Season 6, episode 8: "Second Chance"
2000	Stargate SG-1	Terok	Season 4, episode 14: "The Serpent's Venom"
