= Psych-Out =

1968 counterculture-era feature film directed by Richard Rush

- Theatrical release poster
- Directed by: Richard Rush
- Screenplay by: E. Hunter Willett; Betty Ulius
- Story by: E. Hunter Willett
- Produced by: Dick Clark
- Starring: Susan Strasberg; Dean Stockwell; Jack Nicholson; Bruce Dern; Adam Roarke; Max Julien; The Seeds; Strawberry Alarm Clock
- Cinematography: László Kovács
- Edited by: Renn Reynolds
- Music by: Ronald Stein
- Production company: Dick Clark Productions
- Distributed by: American International Pictures
- Release date: March 6, 1968
- Running time: 82 minutes
- Country: United States
- Language: English

Psych-Out is a 1968 American psychedelic film about hippies, psychedelic music and recreational drugs starring Susan Strasberg, Jack Nicholson (the film's leading man despite being billed under supporting player Dean Stockwell), Bruce Dern, Adam Roarke, and Max Julien. It was produced and released by American International Pictures. The film was directed by Richard Rush, and the cinematographer was László Kovács. The bands Strawberry Alarm Clock and The Seeds can be seen playing within the music and dance scenes throughout the film.

== Plot ==
Jenny is a deaf runaway who arrives in San Francisco's Haight-Ashbury district searching for her brother Steve. She encounters Stoney and his hippie band Mumblin' Jim in a coffee shop. The boys hide her from the police and help her look for her brother. The band is approached by a promoter who arranges for them to perform at a venue called the Ballroom.

Artist Warren, who designs the psychedelic posters advertising the band, freaks out badly in his gallery. While helping him, Jenny notices a large sculpture resembling abstract flames in a corner and recognizes it as her brother's work. The gallery owner says the artist is known as "The Seeker", an itinerant preacher. Ex-band member Dave may know The Seeker's current whereabouts. Dave's information leads the gang to a junkyard, where Jenny recognizes her brother's car. A group of thugs who frequent the junkyard accost the group and threaten to rape Jenny. Violence ensues, and the group barely escape with their lives.

In Stoney's crowded home, everyday hippie life is less than ideal. The residents are all involved in contemplation, sex, sleeping, dancing or decorating, but with little cleaning or maintenance. Jenny tries to wash the mountain of dishes in the kitchen and finds that the plumbing is broken. Frustrated, she goes for a walk. Stoney goes to find her and ends up at the art gallery, where he hears breaking glass and slips inside. Steve, AKA The Seeker, has returned to the art gallery to pick up his sculpture. He is glad that Jenny is looking for him, but says he is on drugs and wants to be sober when they meet. He tells Stoney that Jenny's deafness is the result of trauma caused by their abusive mother.

The performance at the Ballroom is a success. The Seeker shows up, hoping to see Jenny, but the junkyard thugs chase him back to his home. At an after-show party, Dave offers Jenny a glass of orange juice spiked with STP. Stoney charges in and angrily shouts at Jenny. Heartbroken, Jenny accepts Dave's glass of fruit juice and drinks nearly all of it. Jenny again explains her search for Steve, and Dave pulls a note from his pocket containing an address and the words "God is in the flame." Jenny runs out and takes a streetcar to the address, with Stoney and Dave, now tripping, close behind.

Pursued by the junkyard thugs back to his home, Steve lights a fire inside his shrine. Jenny arrives just in time to see him standing in the middle of the flames, absorbed in prayer; he sees her, but merely smiles and waves. In her grief and confusion, she runs up to the roof, hallucinating wildly, ending up at the middle of the Golden Gate Bridge with cars coming at her from both directions. She holds her hands over her ears, and Dave and Stoney find her. Dave shoves her out of the way of an oncoming car and is struck and killed. As he dies, he murmurs that he hopes this, too, will be a good trip. Sickened and angry, Jenny tries to leave, but Stoney embraces her. The film ends with the two holding each other and crying.

== Cast ==
- Susan Strasberg as Jenny Davis
- Dean Stockwell as Dave
- Jack Nicholson as Stoney
- Bruce Dern as Steve Davis
- Max Julien as Elwood
- Adam Roarke as Ben
- Henry Jaglom as Warren
- Linda Gaye Scott as Lynn
- I.J. Jefferson as Pandora
- Ken Scott as Preacher
- Garry Marshall as Plainclothesman
- John Cardos as Thug
- Gary Kent as Thug Leader
- The Seeds as Themselves
- Strawberry Alarm Clock as Themselves

== Production ==
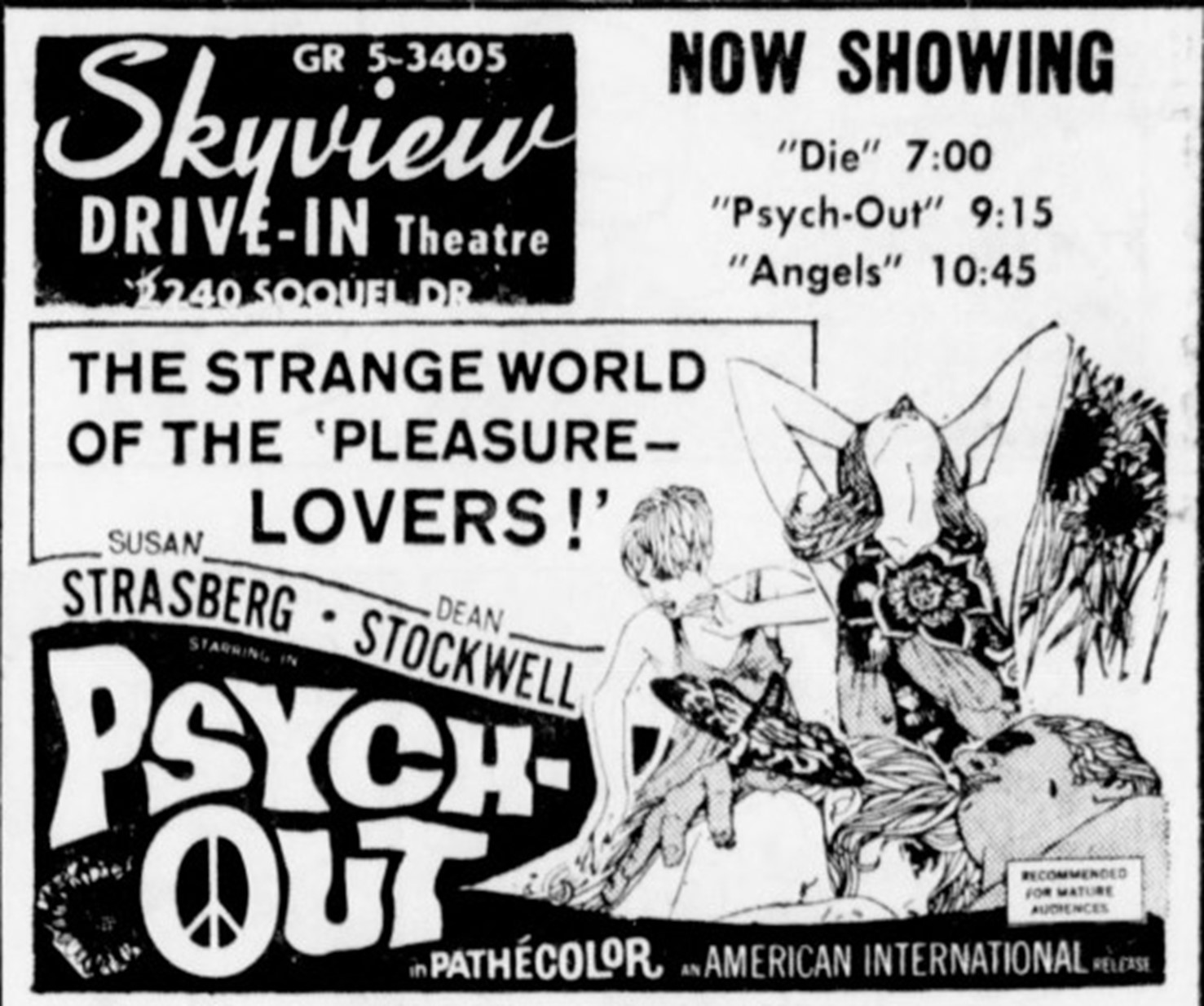
Drive-in advertisement from 1968.

Dick Clark, who produced the film, wrote in his memoirs that he insisted that the film have an anti-drug message:

"... because I'd seen the kids in the hippie commune living in awful squalor. In the film you see scenes where it’s all wonderful, they’re all stoned-out having a great time. Then there’s the morning-after scene — the garbage lying around, a roach crawling through the food, a half-eaten orange crawling with maggots... If you saw it [the film] today you’d say it was a reasonably accurate view of what was going on then."

The film was originally titled The Love Children, but was changed at the request of distributors who worried that audiences might think it was "a film about bastards." Producer Samuel Z. Arkoff came up with the new title of Psych-Out based on a recent successful reissue of Psycho.

Filming took place between October and November 1967 on a 22 day schedule.

The film's special effects were created by stunt coordinator Gary Kent.

The majority of the songs in the film and on the original soundtrack album were performed by the Storybook, a San Fernando Valley garage band. The version of "The Pretty Song from Psych-Out" that appears on the film's soundtrack album was recorded by the Storybook, but the version heard in the film was by Strawberry Alarm Clock.

== Release ==
Director Richard Rush's cut came in at 101 minutes and was edited to 82 minutes by the producers, a version that would be released on DVD by Fox Video in 2003, along with The Trip (1967) as a double-bill. HBO Video's VHS release used a 98-minute version. On February 17, 2015, a 101-minute director's cut was released on DVD and Blu-ray.

== See also ==
- List of American films of 1968
- Hippie exploitation films
- List of films featuring hallucinogens
- List of films featuring the deaf and hard of hearing
