= Gary Kent =

American film actor and director (1933–2023)

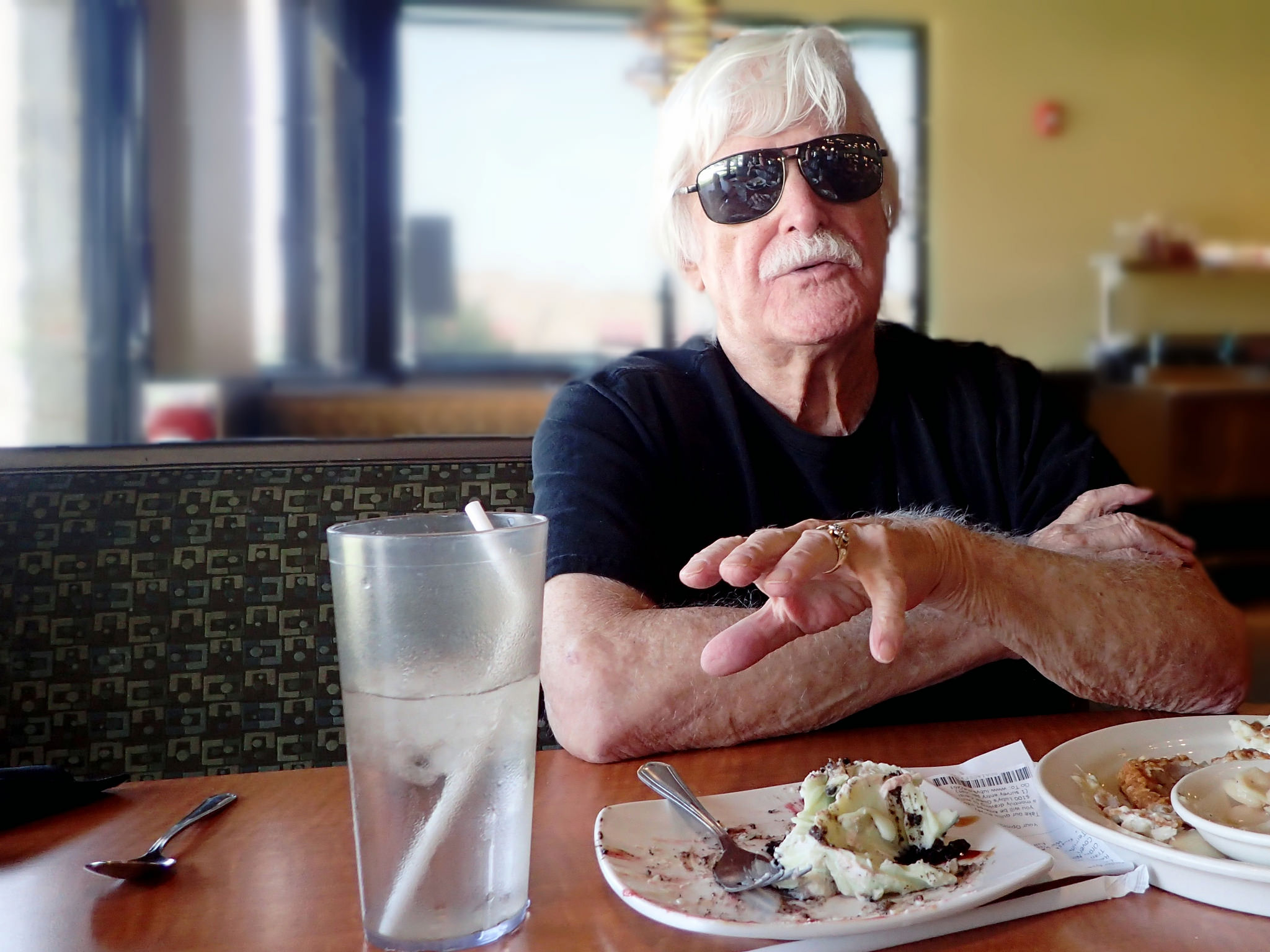
- Kent in 2016
- Born: June 7, 1933; Walla Walla, Washington, U.S.
- Died: May 25, 2023 (aged 89); Austin, Texas, U.S.
- Education: University of Washington
- Occupations: Actor; stuntman
- Years active: 1959–2023

Gary Kent (June 7, 1933 – May 25, 2023) was an American film director, actor, and stuntman notable for his appearances in various independent and exploitation films. A native of Washington, Kent studied at the University of Washington before later embarking on a film career. He made his feature film debut in Battle Flame (1959) and had roles in several additional low-budget films in the 1960s, including The Black Klansman (1966) and the biker film The Savage Seven (1968). He also served as a stunt double for Bruce Dern in Psych-Out (1969).

Kent and his experiences as a stuntman served as one of the inspirations for Cliff Booth, the character portrayed by Brad Pitt in Quentin Tarantino's Once Upon a Time in Hollywood (2019).

== Biography ==
=== Early life ===
Kent was born on June 7, 1933, on a wheat ranch in Walla Walla, Washington, the son of Arthur E. and Iola Kent. He graduated from Renton High School in Renton, Washington, a suburb of Seattle, and attended the University of Washington, where he studied journalism, played football and pole-vaulted on the track team. In 1952, after one quarter at UW, he dropped out to join the U.S. Navy. Stationed in Texas, he wrote promotion and publicity for the elite flying team, The Blue Angels. He was honorably discharged in 1954.

=== Career ===
In 1955 Kent moved to Hollywood with his wife, Joyce, and son, Greg, and worked as a parking lot attendant while looking for acting jobs. He eventually worked primarily in drive-in exploitation films. He acted, worked stunts, and directed action for directors Richard Rush, Monte Hellman, Al Adamson, Don Jones, Ray Dennis Steckler, Peter Bogdanovich, and Brian De Palma. He performed television stunts and acted on Green Hornet, The Man from U.N.C.L.E., and NBC's Daniel Boone starring Fess Parker. Some of the films he directed were The Pyramid (1975) and Rainy Day Friends (1983). Kent doubled Jack Nicholson in stunts in the Richard Rush films Hells Angels on Wheels, The Savage Seven and Psych-Out, and also did his very first stunts in 1966 Nicholson films Ride in the Whirlwind and The Shooting, which shot back to back in Kanab, Utah, under the direction of Monte Hellman.

In his 2009 memoir Shadows and Light, Kent wrote of an "outlaw" cinema aimed at breaking film taboos and barriers. In the book he talks of shooting at Spahn Ranch when Charles Manson and his followers were there. He retired from stunts in 2003 after an accident on Don Coscarelli's film Bubba Ho-Tep, for which Kent served as stunt coordinator, but continued to act in independent films.

=== Personal life ===
Kent was married four times, to Joyce Peacock, 1953-1964 (divorce); Rosemary Galleghly, 1961-1968 (divorce); Sherry Lee Tilley, 1973 (divorce); and Shirley Willeford, 1977-2005 (her death). He had six children: Greg, Colleen, and Andrew with Joyce, and Chris, Alex, and Mike with Rosemary.

=== Later years ===
As of 2018, Kent resided in Austin, Texas. Kent and his career as a stuntman in Hollywood (specifically his experience working at Spahn Ranch while the Manson family resided there) served as inspiration for the character of Cliff Booth (played by Brad Pitt) in Quentin Tarantino's Once Upon a Time in Hollywood (2019). Kent is the subject of Joe M. O'Connell's documentary Danger God.

Kent died in Austin on May 25, 2023, at the age of 89.

== Filmography ==
Year	Title	Role	Notes	Ref.
1959	Battle Flame	Gilcrist		
1964	The Thrill Killers	Barcroft		
1966	The Black Klansman	Wilkins		
1966	Ride in the Whirlwind	—N/a	Stunts	
1966	The Shooting	—N/a	Stunts	
1967	Hells Angels on Wheels	Bearded Hood	Uncredited; also stunts	
1968	Psych-Out	Thug leader	Also stunts	
1968	The Savage Seven	Lansford		
1968	Targets	Gas tank worker		
1968	A Man Called Dagger	—N/a	Stunts	
1969	One Million AC/DC	Olaf		
1969	The Mighty Gorga	Arnold		
1969	Satan's Sadists	Johnny		
1969	Body Fever	Frankie		
1970	Hell's Bloody Devils	Hit Man		
1971	The Incredible 2-Headed Transplant	Motorcyclist	Stunts	
1971	The Return of Count Yorga	—N/a	Stunts	
1971	Dracula vs. Frankenstein	Bob		
1972	Angels' Wild Women			
1973	Schoolgirls in Chains	Frank		
1974	Freebie and the Bean	Ambulance Attendant	Also stunts	
1982	The Forest	John		
1983	Lost	Jack		
1988	Lethal Pursuit	Bud		
1994	Color of Night			
1996	Street Corner Justice	Monsignor Rowan		
2002	Bubba Ho-Tep	—N/a	Stunts	
