= Kent Taylor =

American actor (1907–1987)

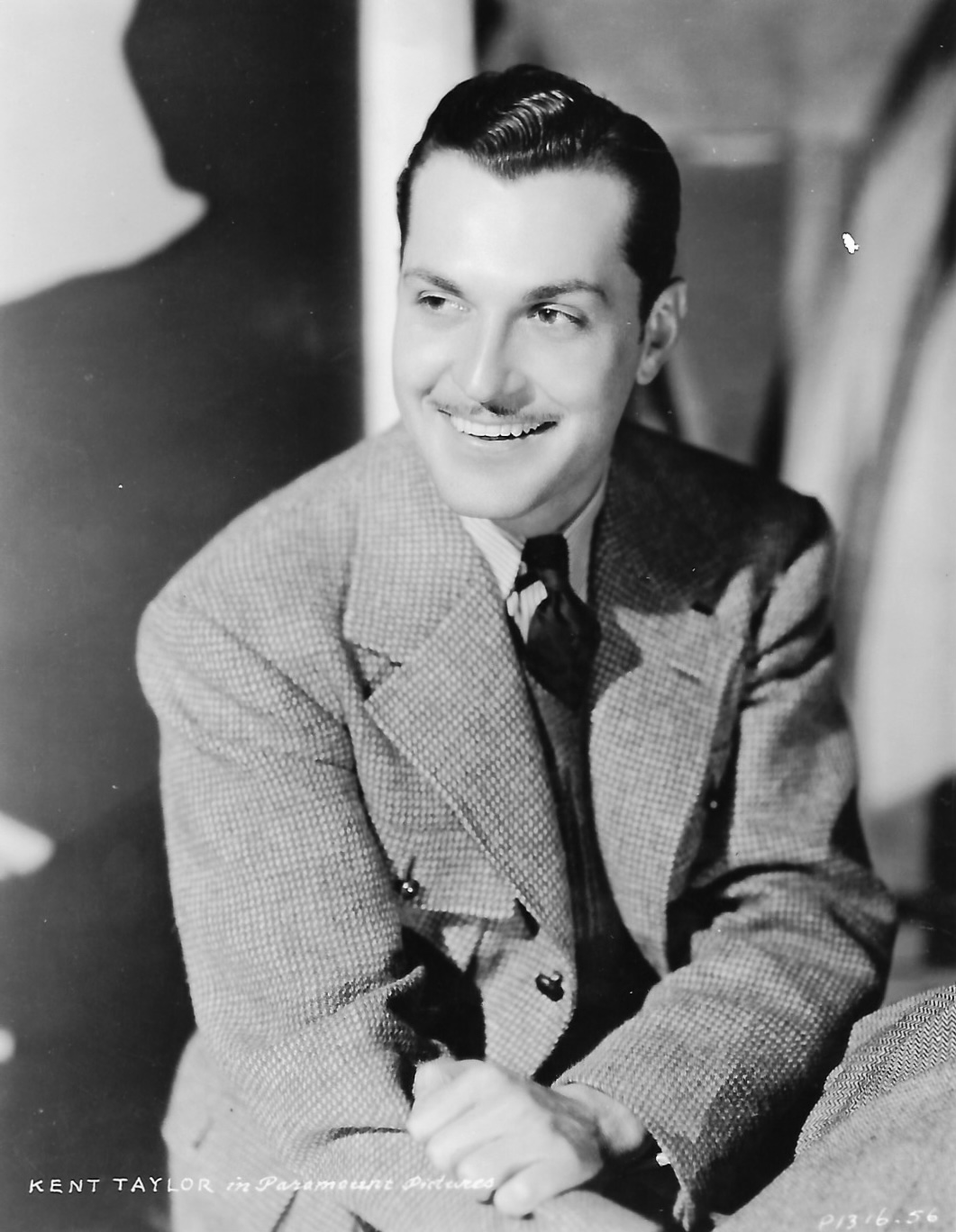
- Taylor c. 1940s
- Born: Louis William Weiss; May 11, 1906; Nashua, Iowa, U.S.
- Died: April 11, 1987 (aged 80); Woodland Hills, Los Angeles, California, U.S.
- Burial place: Westwood Village Memorial Park Cemetery in Los Angeles
- Years active: 1931–1974
- Spouse: Augusta Kulek Taylor (m. 1930)
- Children: 3

Kent Taylor (born Louis William Weiss; May 11, 1906 – April 11, 1987) was an American actor of film and television. Taylor appeared in more than 110 films, the bulk of them B-movies in the 1930s and 1940s, although he also had roles in more prestigious studio releases, including Merrily We Go to Hell (1932), I'm No Angel (1933), Cradle Song (1933), Death Takes a Holiday (1934), Payment on Demand (1951), and Track the Man Down (1955). He had the lead role in Half Past Midnight in 1948, among a few others.

== Early years ==
Kent Taylor was born Louis William Weiss on May 11, 1906, to a Jewish family in Nashua, Iowa, Taylor moved with his family to Waterloo, Iowa, when he was 7. He worked at a variety of jobs after high school, and for two years he studied engineering at the Darrah Institute of Technology in Chicago. He and his family moved to California in 1931.

== Career ==
With no prior professional acting experience, Kent began working as a film extra in 1931 on the advice of a friend who said he had the right looks for "a good screen type." Prior to background work, he was co-operator of an awning service shop with his father. After a few very minor extra roles in films such as Kick In (1931), he was called in "to try out a new camera idea;" a silent sequence was shot using Taylor and Claire Dodd, who was by then an established player at Paramount. The test led to Taylor being offered a contract with Paramount, which he signed on July 11, 1931.

In his early career at Paramount Taylor was often paired with Evelyn Venable. By 1934, they had made six films together for Paramount, including Death Takes a Holiday and The Country Chairman. In 1936, Taylor left Paramount and was signed under contract by Universal. In the 1940s, Taylor was noted for his performance as a dare-devil stunt-man in the Hollywood tale I'm Still Alive. Later, Taylor portrayed Doc Holliday in Tombstone, the Town Too Tough to Die (1942) starring Richard Dix as Wyatt Earp. During the production of Arm Surgeon (1942), Taylor suffered an on set injury when he fractured multiple ribs during a fight scene.

In 1951–1952, with his movie career on the decline and television production on the upswing, he played the title role in 58 episodes of the detective series Boston Blackie and the lead, as Captain Jim Flagg, in ABC's The Rough Riders, an adventure series about three soldiers, two Union and one Confederate, traveling together through the American West after the Civil War. The Rough Riders aired thirty-nine episodes from 1958 to 1959.

Other minor screen credits include My Little Margie, Tales of Wells Fargo, Zorro, Riverboat, The Rifleman, Tombstone Territory, Sugarfoot, Bat Masterson, Laramie, Mr. Lucky, Tightrope, Peter Gunn, Hawaiian Eye, The Brothers Brannagan, The Ann Sothern Show, Voyage to the Bottom of the Sea, and Rango.

He starred in the 1962 film The Broken Land with Jack Nicholson and Diana Darrin. The last years of his career were spent in low budget Biker, SciFi, and Horror films such as, “The Day Mars Invaded Earth” released in 1962, Brides of Blood (1968), Satan's Sadists (1969), The Mighty Gorga (1969), Brain of Blood (1971), Blood of Ghastly Horror (1972), Angels' Wild Women (1972), and Girls for Rent (1974).

== Clark Kent ==
Along with Clark Gable, Kent Taylor served as the inspiration behind the name of Superman's alter-ego Clark Kent.

== Personal life ==
Taylor died on April 9, 1987, at age 80, at the Motion Picture & Television Country House and Hospital in Woodland Hills, California, of complications during heart surgery. He was survived by his wife and three children.

== Selected filmography ==
- Born to Love (1931) as Dancing Doughboy (uncredited)
- Ladies' Man (1931) as Night Club Patron (uncredited)
- Kick In (1931) as Counter Man in Shop (uncredited)
- The Magnificent Lie (1931) as Cafe Customer (uncredited)
- The Road to Reno (1931) as One of Jackie's Admirers (uncredited)
- The False Madonna (1931) as Footman (uncredited)
- Husband's Holiday (1931) as Miguel Balboa (scenes deleted)
- Two Kinds of Women (1932) as Milt Fleisser (uncredited)
- Dancers in the Dark (1932) as Saxophonist (uncredited)
- One Hour with You (1932) as Party Guest Greeted by Colette (uncredited)
- Sinners in the Sun (1932) as Dancing Gigolo (uncredited)
- Forgotten Commandments (1932) as Gregor
- Merrily We Go to Hell (1932) as Gregory 'Greg' Boleslavsky
- The Man from Yesterday (1932) as Military Policeman (uncredited)
- Make Me a Star (1932) as Theatre Doorman Ticket Taker (uncredited)
- Devil and the Deep (1932) as A Friend at Party (uncredited)
- Blonde Venus (1932) as Hiker (uncredited)
- The Night of June 13 (1932) as Reporter (uncredited)
- If I Had a Million (1932) as Bank Teller (uncredited)
- The Sign of the Cross (1932) as Romantic Spectator (uncredited)
- Under-Cover Man (1932) as Russ (uncredited)
- The Mysterious Rider (1933) as Wade Benton
- Tonight Is Ours (1933) as Minor Role (uncredited)
- A Lady's Profession (1933) as Dick Garfield
- The Story of Temple Drake (1933) as First Jellybean (uncredited)
- Sunset Pass (1933) as Clink Peeples
- I'm No Angel (1933) as Kirk Lawrence
- White Woman (1933) as David von Elst
- Cradle Song (1933) as Antonio Perez
- David Harum (1934) as John Lennox
- Death Takes a Holiday (1934) as Corrado
- Double Door (1934) as Rip Van Brett
- The Scarlet Empress (1934) as Paul (uncredited)
- Many Happy Returns (1934) as Movie Actor (uncredited)
- Mrs. Wiggs of the Cabbage Patch (1934) as Bob Redding
- Limehouse Blues (1934) (aka East End Chant) as Eric Benton
- The County Chairman (1935) as Ben Harvey
- College Scandal (1935) as Seth Dunlap
- Smart Girl (1935) as Nick Graham
- Without Regret (1935) as Steven Paradin
- Two-Fisted (1935) as Clint Blackburn
- My Marriage (1936) as John DeWitt Tyler III
- The Sky Parade (1936) as Tommy Wade
- Florida Special (1936) as Wally Tucker
- Ramona (1936) as Felipe Moreno
- The Accusing Finger (1936) as Jerry Welch
- When Love Is Young (1937) as Andy Russell
- Wings Over Honolulu (1937) as Gregory Chandler
- Love in a Bungalow (1937) as Jeff Langan
- The Lady Fights Back (1937) as Owen Merrill
- A Girl with Ideas (1937) as Frank Barnes
- Prescription for Romance (1937) as Steve Macy
- The Jury's Secret (1938) as Walter Russell
- The Last Express (1938) as Duncan MacLain
- Pirates of the Skies (1939) as Robert Maitland
- Four Girls in White (1939) as Nick Conlon
- The Gracie Allen Murder Case (1939) as Bill Brown
- Five Came Back (1939) as Joe Brooks
- Three Sons (1939) as Gene Pardway
- Sued for Libel (1939) as Steve Lonegan
- Escape to Paradise (1939) as Richard Fleming
- I Take This Woman (1940) as Phil Mayberry
- Two Girls on Broadway (1940) as 'Chat' Chatsworth
- Girl in 313 (1940) as Gregg Dunn
- Girl from Avenue A (1940) as MacMillan Forrester
- Men Against the Sky (1940) as Martin Ames
- I'm Still Alive (1940) as Steve Bennett
- Repent at Leisure (1941) as Richard Hughes
- Washington Melodrama (1941) as Hal Thorne
- Frisco Lil (1942) as Peter Brewster
- Gang Busters (1942, Serial) as Det. Lt. Bill Bannister
- Mississippi Gambler (1942) as John J. 'Johnny' Forbes
- Tombstone, the Town Too Tough to Die (1942) as Doc Holiday
- Halfway to Shanghai (1942) as Frederick Barton
- Army Surgeon (1942) as Lt. Philip 'Phil' Harvey
- Bomber's Moon (1943) as Capt. Paul von Block
- Roger Touhy, Gangster (1944) as Police Capt. Steven Warren
- Alaska (1944) as Gary Corbett
- The Daltons Ride Again (1945) as Bob Dalton
- Young Widow (1946) as Peter Waring
- Smooth as Silk (1946) as Mark Fenton
- Tangier (1946) as Ramon
- Deadline for Murder (1946) as Steve Millard
- Dangerous Millions (1946) as Jack Clark
- The Crimson Key (1947) as Lawrence 'Larry' Morgan
- Second Chance (1947) as Kendal Wolf
- Half Past Midnight (1948) as Wade Hamilton
- The Sickle or the Cross (1949) as Rev. John Burnside
- Federal Agent at Large (1950) as Mark Reed, aka Nick Ravel
- Western Pacific Agent (1950) as Rod Kendall
- Trial Without Jury (1950) as Jed Kilgore
- Payment on Demand (1951) as Robert Townsend
- Playgirl (1954) as Ted Andrews
- Track the Man Down (1955) as John Ford
- Secret Venture (1955) as Ted O'Hara
- The Phantom from 10,000 Leagues (1955) as Dr. Ted Stevens
- Slightly Scarlet (1956) as Frank Jansen
- Ghost Town (1956) as Anse Conroy
- Frontier Gambler (1956) as Roger 'The Duke' Chadwick
- The Iron Sheriff (1957) as Phil Quincy
- The Restless Gun (1958) Episode "Imposter for a Day"
- Fort Bowie (1958) as Col. James Garrett
- Gang War (1958) as Bryce Barker, Meadows' Attorney
- Walk Tall (1960) as Frank Carter
- The Purple Hills (1961) as Johnny Barnes
- The Broken Land (1962) as Marshal Jim Cogan
- The Firebrand (1962) as Maj. Tim Bancroft
- The Day Mars Invaded Earth (1962) (aka Spaceraid 63) as Dr. David Fielding
- Harbor Lights (1963) as Dan Crown
- The Crawling Hand (1963) as Dr. Max Weitzberg
- Law of the Lawless (1964) as Attorney Rand McDonald
- Blood of Ghastly Horror (1967) as Dr. Elton Corey
- Brides of Blood (1968) as Dr. Paul Henderson
- Satan's Sadists (1969) as Lew
- The Mighty Gorga (1969) as Tonga Jack Adams
- Hell's Bloody Devils (1970) as Count Otto Von Delberg
- Brain of Blood (1971) as Dr. Trenton
- Angels' Wild Women (1972) as Parker
- I Spit on Your Corpse (1974) (aka Girls for Rent) as Moreno
