= C.C. and Company =

1970 film

- Theatrical release poster
- Directed by: Seymour Robbie
- Written by: Roger Smith
- Produced by: Allan Carr; Roger Smith
- Starring: Joe Namath; Ann-Margret; William Smith
- Cinematography: Charles Wheeler
- Edited by: Fred Chulack
- Music by: Lenny Stack
- Production companies: Namanco; Rogallan Productions
- Distributed by: AVCO Embassy Pictures
- Release date: October 14, 1970
- Running time: 94 minutes
- Country: United States
- Language: English
- Box office: $1.1 million (US/ Canada rentals) or $2.8 million

C.C. and Company is a 1970 American biker film directed by Seymour Robbie. It starred Joe Namath as biker C.C. Ryder, Ann-Margret as fashion journalist Ann, and William Smith as Moon, the leader of the fictitious outlaw biker club the "Heads Company". The film also features singer Wayne Cochran and his band The C.C. Riders.

== Plot ==
C.C. Ryder falls in with a biker gang in the desert, and then rescues Ann from trouble with the same gang. There next occurs a motocross race tied in with a fashion shoot. The Heads disrupt the event, but C.C. Ryder enters the race to gain Ann's favor. This puts him in conflict with Moon. When Ryder wins the race and leaves with his award money the gang kidnaps Ann, and Ryder must ride back to save her.

== Cast ==
- Joe Namath as C. C. Ryder
- Ann-Margret as Ann McCalley
- William Smith as Moon
- Jennifer Billingsley as Pom Pom
- Mike Battle as Rabbit
- Greg Mullavey as Lizard
- Teda Bracci as Pig
- Don Chastain as Eddie Ellis
- Sid Haig as Crow
- Bruce Glover as Captain Midnight
- Keva Kelly as Tandalaya
- Jackie Rohr as Zit-Zit
- Robert Keyworth as Charlie Hopkins
- Alan Pappe as Photographer
- Ned Wertimer as Motorcycle salesman
- Wayne Cochran as himself and his band

== Reception ==
Reviews were mostly negative. It was described by The New York Times reviewer Vincent Canby as "the picture to name when someone asks you to recommend 'a good bad movie.'":

It's not very long; it pays attention to every hallowed idiocy of its genre, and its characters talk a marvelously unreal type of movie repartee.

(Truck-driver: "You a student?"

She (cheerfully): "No. I'm a teen-age prostitute. Give you any ideas?")

What's more, its images are crammed with advertisements (for, among other things, Hamm's Beer, Hondas and Kraft Cheese) that are its own kind of relevant symbology.

In his Chicago Tribune review, Gene Siskel, who supplied it with no stars, felt it was "hateful", adding:

"C.C. and Company" is the film that asks the musical question, "What do you want—bad acting or bad taste?" Director Seymore Robbie's idea is to have the women in the film make obscene remarks with their fingers and mouth.

After 20 minutes of visual effluvia, the big race is finally on. No, not around the dirt motorcycle track ... the one up in the aisles.

Ann-Margret has a brief nude scene in which she proves that in addition to having a foul mouth she is fat.

The film was also blasted by the Cleveland Press' Tony Mastroianni:

"C. C. and Company" arrives on the waves of such big budget ballyhoo that it seems a shame to dismiss it by simply calling it awful, which it is.

How about meretricious? That's a big budget word for awful and the fellows responsible for this picture needn't feel they've been short-changed in the adjective department. "C. C." is a simple-minded movie for simple-minded audiences. There were times when it came close to being a fairly simple-hearted exercise in action melodramatics if it weren't so purposely and unrelievedly foul mouthed. The motorcycle movie is trying very hard to be a type by itself but it remains basically a western with wheels instead of hooves. This one is a variation on the old melodrama romance plot that at various times has been about an outlaw and a lady, a rustler and the rancher's daughter, a virgin and a gypsy, a princess and commoner and on and on. Football player Joe Namath should have stuck to football ... Actress Ann Margret should have taken up football or something else other than acting.

...

[William] Smith offers a perfect picture of nastiness, especially with his whisper-soft voice. He should stick to acting. In one scene a man points to [Joe] Namath and says " ... that's what gives motorcycling a bad name."

So do movies like this one.

Filmink called it a "remarkably poor vehicle for Ann-Margret "considering it was written by her husband".

The film's trailer is played during a scene in a movie theater in Quentin Tarantino's 2019 film Once Upon a Time in Hollywood. (This constitutes an anachronism, as Tarantino's film is set in February 1969, and C.C. and Company was not released until October 1970.)

== See also ==
- The Black Six, a 1974 biker film starring six then-current NFL players
- List of American films of 1970
