= The Mini-Skirt Mob =

1968 film by Maury Dexter

- Teaser poster
- Directed by: Maury Dexter
- Written by: James Gordon White
- Produced by: Maury Dexter
- Starring: Diane McBain; Jeremy Slate; Sherry Jackson; Patty McCormack
- Cinematography: Archie R. Dalzell
- Edited by: Sidney Levin
- Music by: Les Baxter; Val Johns
- Distributed by: American International Pictures
- Release date: May 23, 1968
- Running time: 82 minutes
- Country: United States
- Language: English
- Box office: $1,500,000 (US/ Canada)

The Mini-Skirt Mob is a 1968 American outlaw biker film directed by Maury Dexter and starring Diane McBain, Jeremy Slate, Sherry Jackson, Patty McCormack, Harry Dean Stanton and Sandra Marshall. It was written by James Gordon White. An all-female motorcycle gang leader torments her former boyfriend and his bride.

== Plot ==
Jilted by her ex-boyfriend Jeff Logan, Shayne (the leader of an all-female motorcycle gang) and her new boyfriend Lon decide to torment Jeff and his new bride, Connie. The harassment backfires when Shayne's sister Edie is accidentally killed by a Molotov cocktail and when Shayne herself ends up hanging by her fingernails off a cliff and falls to her death.

== Cast ==
- Jeremy Slate as Lon
- Diane McBain as Shayne
- Sherry Jackson as Connie
- Patty McCormack as Edie
- Ross Hagen as Jeff
- Harry Dean Stanton as "Spook"

== Production ==
Referring to McBain's lead role, the movie's trailer exclaimed, "Nothing is more vicious than a scorned, guilt-ridden blonde. The mini-skirt mob. They like it rough." Following the film's release, McBain said she enjoyed the role, "I thought it would be fun playing a sadistic killer because women don't usually get those roles." McBain also noted that she and Sherry Jackson did their own fight scene and said it wasn't a problem since they were actually good friends.

Maury Dexter says the film was the most successful of all the ones he made at AIP.

== Reception ==
One of the more amusing, if outlandish permutations of the biker flick genre, which by 1968 had already started to lose steam as a straight "exploitation" trope, The Mini-Skirt Mob well illustrates AIP's knack for cashing in on current trends. Gorgeously filmed in the vast expanses of the Arizona desert, Mini-Skirt is an exploitation film that really delivers. For the exploitation crowd, the film offers orgies, catfights, some strong language and discreet nudity; there is also some impressive stunt action with cars and bikes.

The Monthly Film Bulletin wrote: "The crude melodrama turns exclusively on jealousy and violence, and its sole, minor interest lies in the fact – borne out when the 'heroine' lets Shayne fall to her death – that the victims' tactics of threats and flight make them no more morally attractive than their aggressors. Diane McBain has a little fun with Shayne's petulance and sadism, but otherwise performances from both cast and technicians are strictly routine."

Variety wrote: "Since neither taste nor logic seems to be necessary for the success of film cycle gang slam-bangs, American-International quite likely has another moneymaker. B.O prospects look particularly good from teeny-boppers, tired old men, and others who like sex and violence revved up and explicit. As produced and directed by Maury Dexter, film does have slickness and polish, however, helped, too, by Les Baxter's excellent scoring."

Boxoffice wrote: "Producer-director Maury Dexter has set his slight tale in some scenic desert locations, nicely caught by Arch R. Danzell's color cameras. ... Much of James Gordon White's screenplay will draw laughs, but the young set doesn't take this kind of film seriously to begin with. There is some exciting motorcycle footage and a hair-curling cat fight between the two female leads. At any rate, it's nice to see the action shifted to the distaff side for a change, although it might be best to ignore the psychological implications."

Nostalgia Central wrote: "There is plenty of rambunctious vitality and crude humour but the film never stoops for the cheap thrill. It’s sharply-paced, well-photographed, and the whole production has a great sense of freedom."

== See also ==
- List of American films of 1968
