= Jack Starrett =

American actor

- Born: Claude Ennis Starrett Jr. November 2, 1936; Refugio, Texas, U.S.
- Died: March 27, 1989 (aged 52); Sherman Oaks, California, U.S.
- Occupations: Actor, film director
- Years active: 1961–1987
- Spouse: Valerie Starrett

Claude Ennis "Jack" Starrett Jr. (November 2, 1936–March 27, 1989) was an American actor and film director.

Starrett is perhaps best known for his role as Gabby Johnson, a parody of George "Gabby" Hayes, in the 1974 film Blazing Saddles and is also known for his role as the brutal policeman Art Galt in the 1982 action film First Blood. He also played the cruel foreman Swick in The River (1984).

Starrett acted in the biker films The Born Losers, Hells Angels on Wheels (both from 1967), Angels from Hell (1968) and Hell's Bloody Devils (1970), and directed two more: Run, Angel, Run in 1969 and Nam's Angels (1970), as well as the horror film Race with the Devil (1975)—that was filmed in his home state of Texas – in which he also played a gas station attendant.

== Life and career ==
Starrett was raised in Refugio, Texas and worked in the oil fields before coming to Hollywood. He starred in the 1961 film Like Father Like Son as Coach Jennings and later reprised the role in The Young Sinner in 1965 and Like Father Like Son in 1987.

Valerie Starrett, his wife at one time, said Jack had always wished to direct rather than act. He made an uncredited first attempt at direction when the original director of The Girls from Thunder Strip needed assistance.

Throughout his career, Starrett directed feature films and episodes of television programs. In addition, he made guest appearances on TV shows including Hill Street Blues, Hunter, The A-Team, and Knight Rider (in which he made three guest appearances as different characters.) Starrett starred in three short films directed by Tony Schweikle. Starrett and Schweikle stayed close friends until Starrett's death.

He played the mumbling Gabby Johnson in Mel Brooks' 1974 film Blazing Saddles that was deemed "culturally, historically, or aesthetically significant" by the Library of Congress and was selected for preservation in the National Film Registry.

== Death ==
Starrett died from liver failure in Sherman Oaks, California at the age of 52. According to his sister, he had been ill for "some time". At the time of his death he was married to Valerie Starrett.

== Filmography ==
=== Film ===
Director

- Run, Angel, Run! (1969)
- House of Zodiac (1969)
- Nam's Angels (1970)
- Cry Blood, Apache (1970)
- The Strange Vengeance of Rosalie (1972)
- Slaughter (1972)
- Cleopatra Jones (1973)
- The Gravy Train (1974)
- Race with the Devil (1975)
- The New Spartans (1975)
- A Small Town in Texas (1976)
- Hollywood Man (1976)
- Walking Tall: Final Chapter (1977)
- Kiss My Grits (1982)

Actor

Year	Title	Role	Notes
1965	The Young Sinner	Coach Jennings	Filmed in 1961
1967	Hells Angels on Wheels	Sergeant Bingham	
1967	The Born Losers	Deputy Fred	
1968	Angels from Hell	Bingham	
1969	The Gay Deceivers	Colonel Dixon	
1970	Hell's Bloody Devils	Rocky	
1970	The Girls from Thunder Strip	Sheriff	
1970	Nam's Angels	Chet Davis	Uncredited
1970	Cry Blood, Apache	The Deacon	
1973	Kid Blue	Tough Guy	
1974	Blazing Saddles	Gabby Johnson	
1974	The Gravy Train	Gentleman Rancher	
1975	Race with the Devil	Gas Station Attendant	
1976	A Small Town in Texas	Buford Tyler	
1979	The Rose	Dee	
1982	First Blood	Deputy Sergeant Art Galt	
1983	Grizzly II: The Concert	Papas	Unreleased film
1984	The River	Swick	
1987	Like Father Like Son	Coach Jennings	Uncredited
1988	Death Chase	Lieutenant MacGrew	
1988	Brothers in Arms	Father	
1989	Family Reunion	Charlie	
1989	Nightwish	Professor	
1990	Hollywood Heartbreak	Lou Budowski	(final film role)

=== Television ===
==== TV series ====
Director

Year	Title	Notes
1969	The Bold Ones: The New Doctors	2 episodes
1974	Planet of the Apes	Episode: "The Horse Race"
1975-1977	Starsky & Hutch	3 episodes
1978	What Really Happened to the Class of '65?	Episode: "Class Underachiever"
1979	Paris	Episode: "Decisions"
1979	A Man Called Sloane	Episode: "Sweethearts of Disaster"
1979-1980	The Dukes of Hazzard	Two episodes
1980	Beyond Westworld	Episode: "The Lion"
1980	Eischied	Episode: "Powder Burn"
1981	Hill Street Blues	Episode: "Life, Death, Eternity"

Actor

Year	Title	Role	Notes
1971	Cade's County	Wilbur Bain	Episode: "The Mustangers"
1983	Hill Street Blues	Farley	Episode: "Moon Over Uranus"
1983-1985	Knight Rider	Hagen / Lieutenant George Barth / Sheriff	3 episodes
1985	Wildside	General Abraham Wollock	Episode: "Well Known Secret"
1985	Hunter	Dennis Balzer / The Bartender / The Sniper	3 episodes
1986	The A-Team	Wade Blackburn	Episode: "The Duke of Whispering Pines"

==== TV movies ====
Director

- Night Chase (1970)
- Roger and Hary: The Mitera Target (1977)
- Nowhere to Hide (1977)
- Thaddeus Rose and Eddie (1978)
- Big Bob Johnson and His Fantastic Speed Circus (1978)
- Mr. Horn (1979)
- Survival of Dana (1979)

Actor

Year	Title	Role	Notes
1977	Nowhere to Hide	Gus	
1979	Mr. Horn	General George Crook	
1979	Survival of Dana	Police Photographer	Uncredited
