= Like Father, Like Son (1961 film) =

- Theatrical poster
- Directed by: Tom Laughlin
- Written by: Tom Laughlin
- Produced by: Tom Laughlin
- Starring: Tom Laughlin; Stefanie Powers
- Cinematography: Ed Martin; Sven Walnum
- Edited by: Tom Laughlin (as Donald Henderson)
- Music by: Shelly Manne
- Production company: T.C. Frank
- Distributed by: Laurel Films; United Screen Arts
- Release dates: 1961 (limited release); August 1, 1965 (general release)
- Running time: 90 minutes
- Country: United States
- Language: English

Like Father, Like Son, also known as The Young Sinner, is a 1961 American film written, produced and directed by and starring Tom Laughlin. The film was shot in 1961 but not released until 1965 as part of a double feature with A Swingin' Summer. A name used for trailers was "Among the Thorns", and a working title for the film was "We Are All Christ".

== Premise ==
A small town football star is expelled from high school after being caught in bed with his girlfriend.

== Cast ==
- Tom Laughlin as Cris Wotan
- Stefanie Powers as Ginny Miller
- William Wellman Jr. as John
- Robert Fuca as Priest (credited as Robert Angelo)
- Linda March as Tury Martin
- James Stacy as Art
- Chris Robinson as Bobby
- Dennis O'Flaherty as Marty
- Bob Colonna as Harry
- Roxanne Heard as Joan Meyers
- Jack Starrett as Football Coach Jennings
- John Burns as Head Coach Ferguson
- Ed Cook as Assistant Coach Webster
