= Hells Angels on Wheels =

1967 American biker film directed by Richard Rush

- Theatrical release poster
- Directed by: Richard Rush
- Written by: R. Wright Campbell
- Produced by: Joe Solomon
- Starring: Adam Roarke; Jack Nicholson; Sabrina Scharf; Jack Starrett; Jana Taylor; Richard Anders; John Garwood; I.J. Jefferson; James Oliver; Sonny Barger
- Cinematography: László Kovács
- Edited by: William Martin
- Music by: Stu Phillips
- Production company: Fanfare Films
- Distributed by: U.S. Films
- Release date: June 1, 1967
- Running time: 95 minutes
- Country: United States
- Language: English
- Box office: $3 million (rentals)

Hells Angels on Wheels is a 1967 American biker film directed by Richard Rush, and starring Adam Roarke, Jack Nicholson, and Sabrina Scharf. The film tells the story of a gas-station attendant with a bad attitude who finds life more exciting after he is allowed to hang out with a chapter of the Hells Angels outlaw motorcycle club.

== Plot ==
The Angels first take note of "Poet" (Jack Nicholson) after he is fired from his job for assaulting a customer. Later on, Poet pulls up to a convenience store where the gang are doing motorcycle stunts in the carpark. Here, one of the gang accidentally breaks the headlight on Poet's motorcycle and insults it. Poet, with far more guts than brains, challenges the Angel that hit his motorcycle. This is an act that would traditionally result in every Angel present participating in a group beating of the attacker. "When a non-Angel hits an Angel, all Angels retaliate." But the leader of the Angels, Buddy (Adam Roarke), intervenes and tells Poet that the Angels will replace the headlight. In the meantime, he is welcome to ride with them while they take care of business—which turns out to be going to a bar and beating up the members of another club who previously beat an Angel. Poet is told to wait outside, but ends up helping the Angels.

Later that night, after he parted the Angels, Poet accidentally bumps into a sailor. He speaks rudely to him before he realizes that the sailor has three other sailors with him. The four sailors refuse to accept his apology and beat up Poet at four-against-one odds.

The Angels hunt down and beat up the four sailors who beat Poet on odds approaching four to one. One of the sailors pulls a knife on the Angels and is then killed accidentally in the fight.

Poet is allowed to ride with the Angels and is eventually elevated to "prospect" status. He is attracted to Buddy's some-time girlfriend (Sabrina Scharf) who toys with him while remaining hopelessly committed to Buddy.

Much of the story that follows consists of scenes of the Angels partying or being provoked to violence by "squares." Other scenes include running an older man in a car off the road to his death; forcing two cops off the road when freeing their friend, arrested for the death; or trying to enter a bar where they are not welcome, provoking yet another fight.

Eventually, Buddy's girlfriend succeeds in provoking a confrontation between Buddy and Poet, with only one of the men surviving.

== Cast ==
- Adam Roarke as "Buddy"
- Jack Nicholson as "Poet"
- Sabrina Scharf as "Shill"
- Jana Taylor as Abigale
- Richard Anders as "Bull"
- John Garwood as "Jocko"
- I.J. Jefferson as Pearl
- James Oliver as Darrell "Gypsy" Whitman
- Jack Starrett as Sergeant Bingham
- Bruno VeSota as Priest
- Sonny Barger as Hells Angels President
- Robert Allen as Dr. Carstairs
- Virgil Frye as Biker

== Production ==
Adam Roarke, who plays the Angels club president Buddy, starred in several other motorcycle films of the era. Ralph "Sonny" Barger, the president of the Oakland, California chapter of the Hells Angels, is seen in an early scene but has no spoken lines in the film. He was also credited as a consultant. Sabrina Scharf later played the role of Sara in the film Easy Rider (1969), one of the two girls met in the commune.

== Release ==
United States: February 1967(drive-in theater premiere)

Hells Angels on Wheels was released in U.S. theaters on June 1, 1967. The film was released on DVD on December 30, 2003.

== See also ==
- List of American films of 1967
- Outlaw biker film
- List of biker films
- Exploitation film
