= Hell's Bloody Devils =

- Directed by: Al Adamson
- Written by: Jerry Evans
- Produced by: Al Adamson
- Starring: John Gabriel; Anne Randall; Broderick Crawford; Scott Brady; Kent Taylor; Robert Dix; Keith Andes; John Carradine; Jack Starrett; William Bonner; Erin O'Donnell; Vicki Volante; Emily Banks; Bambi Allen; Jill Woelful
- Cinematography: László Kovács; Frank Ruttencutter
- Edited by: John Winfield
- Music by: Don McGinnis
- Distributed by: Independent-International Pictures
- Release date: January 1, 1970
- Running time: 89 min.
- Country: United States
- Language: English

Hell's Bloody Devils (also known as The Fakers and Operation M) is a 1970 American film directed by Al Adamson and written by Jerry Evans.

== Plot ==
FBI agent Mark Adams (John Gabriel) poses as a member of a Las Vegas crime syndicate in order to infiltrate the hideout of a neo-Nazi group. Led by World War II Nazi war criminal Count von Delberg (Kent Taylor), the group prints counterfeit U.S. dollars, which they plan to circulate to help finance their party. Adams is aided from an undercover Israeli agent (Vicki Volante) whose parents were killed by von Delberg during the war; the count has in turn recruited a vicious Swastika-clad motorcycle gang, the Bloody Devils, to do his dirty work.

== Cast ==
- Broderick Crawford as Gavin
- Scott Brady as Brand
- Kent Taylor as Count Otto von Delberg
- Keith Andes as Joe Brimante
- John Carradine as Pet Shop Owner
- John Gabriel as Mark Adams
- Erin O'Donnell as Leni Marvenga
- Vicki Volante as Carol Bechtal
- Anne Randall as Amanda Whitfield
- Jack Starrett as Rocky
- Emily Banks as Jill Harmon
- Dan Kemp as Karl
- Robert Dix as Cunk
- Jerry Mills as Bloody Devil
- Bambi Allen as Pick-up Girl
- Jill Woelfel as Pick-up Girl
- Carol Brewster as Baroness Whitfield
- Leslie McCrea as Maggie
- Gene Otis Shane as Driker
- Arland Shubert as Doctor
- Alyce Andrace as Girl in Pet Shop
- Rhae Andrace as Girl in Pet Shop
- Alice Wong as Receptionist
- Jane Wald as Girl on Boat
- Richard Brander as Lester
- Greydon Clark as Anderson
- Gary Kent as Hit Man
- Bill Bonner as Bloody Devil
- Simon Prescott as Bloody Devil (as Sy Prescott)
- Sid Lawrance as Bloody Devil
- John Cardos as Bloody Devil
- Kent Osborne as Bloody Devil
- Sheldon Lee as Bloody Devil
- Philip de Firmian as Bloody Devil
- Colonel Sanders as himself (uncredited)

== Production ==
Shooting began in 1967 as a spy thriller under the working title Operation M, and then the film was subsequently retitled The Fakers. However, after the film couldn't be sold to a proper distributor, new footage featuring bikers was filmed, incorporated into the plot, and released through Adamson's and producer Sam Sherman's own newly-formed at the time Independent-International Pictures in 1970. According to Tom Weaver's book, It Came from Horrorwood, the bikers used in the film were from a real motorcycle gang and were busted for carrying weapons during production.

Colonel Sanders makes an uncredited cameo appearance inside one of his restaurants, where the protagonists are dining. KFC paid for product placement and also fed the cast and crew.

Nelson Riddle is co-credited as the composer of the opening titles' theme song, however, he was not involved with the production of the film. Sherman and Adamson bought the rights to a pre-existing Riddle cue and used it in the titles.

== Reception ==
A short review of the film by Howard Thompson of The New York Times referred to the use of young motorbike riders he described as "brutes" to be "box-office bait". He also expressed dismay at seeing Broderick Crawford, Scott Brady and Kent Taylor's involvement in the "smoking out" of a Nazi-minded counterfeiter. The review by Peter Roberts of The Grindhouse Cinema Database noted the "funky psychedelic" opening credits montage which he described as "real cool." He also said that "this was more of an espionage film than a biker film." He said that the advertising of the film was to bring in the drive-in audiences. He also said that it was entertaining and those who were "looking for a Hells Angels on Wheels" wouldn't find it in this one. Instead, viewers would get "a crazy mash up of babes, neo-Nazis, sexy bikers spies, undercover cops and shootouts."
