= Run, Angel, Run! =

- Theatrical release poster
- Directed by: Jack Starrett
- Written by: Jerome Wish; V.A. Furlong
- Produced by: Joe Solomon
- Starring: William Smith; Valerie Starrett; Lee de Broux; Gene Shane; Eugene Cornelius; Paul Harper; Dan Kemp
- Cinematography: John M. Stephens
- Edited by: Renn Reynolds
- Music by: Stu Phillips
- Distributed by: Fanfare Films
- Release date: May 22, 1970
- Running time: 95 minutes
- Country: United States
- Language: English
- Budget: $96,000
- Box office: $13 million

Run, Angel, Run! is a 1969 film directed by Jack Starrett and starring William Smith and Valerie Starrett. It was the 20th highest-grossing film of 1969.

== Plot synopsis ==
When Angel writes a story about the Devil's Advocates motorcycle gang, his luck changes. The good news is he sells the story to a magazine for $10,000. The bad news is he is a wanted man, now hunted by the biker gang.

== Cast ==
- William Smith as Angel
- Valerie Starrett as Laurie
- Dan Kemp as Dan Felton
- Gene Shane as Ron
- Lee de Broux as Pappy
- Eugene Cornelius as Space
- Paul Harper as Chic
