= William Wellman Jr. =

American actor (born 1937)

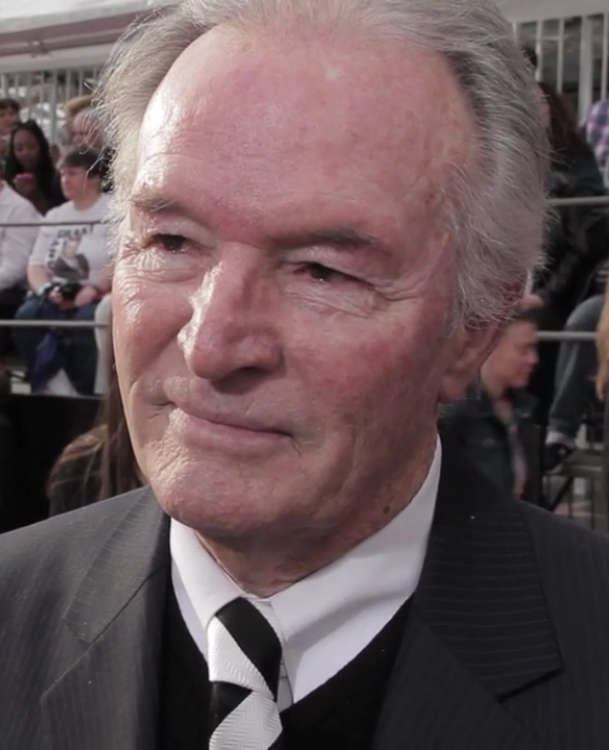
- Wellman in 2012
- Born: January 20, 1937 (age 89); Los Angeles, California, U.S.
- Occupation: Actor
- Years active: 1945–2010
- Parent(s): William A. Wellman; Dorothy Wellman

William Wellman Jr. (born January 20, 1937) is an American former actor. In a career spanning 65 years, he appeared in about 77 films and television series.

== Life and career ==
Wellman was born in Los Angeles, California, and is the son of actress Dorothy Wellman (née Coonan) and director William A. Wellman, about whose life and career he has talked in a number of interviews. His sister is actress Cissy Wellman.

Wellman played the main character, David Michaels, in Image of the Beast and The Prodigal Planet, the last two movies in the Christian end times film series A Thief in the Night. He co-wrote The Prodigal Planet. He also starred in Brother Enemy, which was produced by Mark IV Pictures, the same company that produced the Thief movies.

He played the beatnik biker, Child, in the first Billy Jack (Tom Laughlin) movie The Born Losers and then other characters in follow-up Billy Jack movies, The Trial of Billy Jack and The Return of Billy Jack.

Wellman appeared in the Fred Williamson blaxploitation film Black Caesar and its sequel Hell Up in Harlem, as a character named Alfred Coleman. Both films were directed by Larry Cohen, who also cast him in It's Alive.

In 1959, he appeared in the TV Western Have Gun Will Travel S3, E31 and Gunsmoke as “Roy” and again in 1962 as “Pvt. King”. Wellman appeared in a Chrysler sales training film in the 1970s. He also had a role in Star Trek: Of Gods and Men (2007 three-part, unofficial miniseries) as Charlie Evans (as William Wellman).

== Partial filmography ==
- Darby's Rangers (1958) as Eli Clatworthy
- Lafayette Escadrille (1958) as Bill Wellman Sr.
- Macumba Love (1960) as Warren
- The Errand Boy (1961) as Actor / Lover in Film
- The Alfred Hitchcock Hour (1963) (Season 2 Episode 11: "How to Get Rid of Your Wife") as Delivery Man
- A Swingin Summer (1965) as Rick
- Winter A-Go-Go (1965) as Jeff Forrester
- The Born Losers (1967) as Child
- Hook, Line & Sinker (1969) as CIA Man (uncredited)
- The Brady Bunch (1972) (Season 3 Episode 22: "My Fair Opponent") as Colonel Dick Whitfield
- Adam-12 (1972-1973) (2 episodes)
  - (Season 5 Episode 9: "The Surprise") as Officer Snyder (first aired 11-15-1972)
  - (Season 5 Episode 15: "Clear with a Civilian") as Officer Snyder (first aired 1-17-1973)
- It's Alive (1974) as Charley
- Image of the Beast (1980) as David Michaels
- The Prodigal Planet (1983) as David Michaels
- Star Trek: Of Gods and Men (2008) as Charlie Evans
