= Billy Jack Goes to Washington =

1977 American political drama film by Tom Laughlin

- Theatrical release poster, with its original intended Christmas Day 1976 date
- Directed by: T.C. Frank
- Written by: Tom Laughlin; Delores Taylor
- Produced by: Frank Capra Jr.
- Starring: Tom Laughlin
- Cinematography: Jack A. Marta
- Edited by: Susan Morgan
- Music by: Elmer Bernstein
- Distributed by: Taylor-Laughlin
- Release date: April 16, 1977 (Los Angeles)
- Running time: 155 minutes
- Country: United States
- Language: English

Billy Jack Goes to Washington is a 1977 American political drama film starring Tom Laughlin, the fourth film in the Billy Jack series, and although the earlier films saw enormous success, this film did not. The film only had limited screenings upon its release and never saw a general theatrical release, but has since become widely available on DVD. The film is a loose remake of the 1939 Frank Capra film Mr. Smith Goes to Washington, and is directed by Laughlin under the on-screen pseudonym "T.C. Frank".

== Plot ==
Billy Jack is appointed a United States Senator to fill out the remaining term of another senator. It is hoped that he will quietly vote the party line, but his term in the Senate runs into trouble when he proposes a bill to fund a national youth camp which happens to be on the property where a nuclear power plant is also being proposed. His fellow senator, Joseph Paine, claims to oppose nuclear power but is secretly taking graft to influence his votes in favor, and moves to try to keep Billy Jack out of the way when the bill is being debated.

Seeking to keep Billy out of the Senate on a day when a controversial energy bill is being voted on, Senator Paine suggests he should meet with a grassroots group that day instead. The group is working to pass a national initiative and Billy Jack becomes convinced of their cause.

Billy is invited to meet with a group of lobbyists attempting to offer him bribes and other perks if he will vote their way. Up against a man named Bailey who wields a powerful influence in his home state, Billy Jack has his political career and reputation at stake if he does not cooperate. Billy responds with anger at their threat.

The next day in the Senate, he tries to speak on the floor in opposition to the nuclear power plant. Paine responds by proposing to expel Billy from the Senate as unfit for office. Billy's assistant quits after the murder of a lobbyist, fearing for her own safety, but returns after Billy Jack is about to be expelled from the Senate, to help him learn Senate procedure in order to filibuster. Billy collapses on the Senate floor in the effort, whereupon Paine confesses to his colleagues that every word Billy spoke was the truth.

== Cast ==
- Tom Laughlin as Billy Jack
- E. G. Marshall as Senator Joseph Paine
- John Lawlor as Dan McArthur
- Lucie Arnaz as Saunders
- Delores Taylor as Jean
- Suzanne Somers as Sue
- Sam Wanamaker as Bailey
- Richard Sanders as Jerry
- Peter Donat as Ralph Butler
- Pat O'Brien as The Vice President
- Dick Gautier as Governor Hopper
- Gwen Farrell as Reporter

== Production ==
Following the failure of The Master Gunfighter, producer Frank Capra Jr. approached Laughlin about his longstanding desire to remake his father's film, Mr. Smith Goes to Washington as a Billy Jack film, after a previous attempt at adapting the film as a musical with John Denver as the lead fell through. Laughlin was receptive towards the idea feeling that venturing into mainstream politics was a natural step for the character of Billy Jack. Laughlin staged junkets to show off the set and to raise more money for the independently financing, even promising investors bit parts in the film. Laughlin posed for photos against Washington, D.C. landmarks in his black Billy Jack costume to generate more press attention.

As with the two previous films in the series, Laughlin's wife Delores Taylor and daughter Teresa Laughlin reprise their roles. Julie Webb and several other supporting actors from Billy Jack and The Trial of Billy Jack return as well. Author and political journalist Joe Klein appears briefly as a reporter in the opening scene. (Klein became friends with Laughlin after interviewing him for Rolling Stone in 1975.)

A new version of the song "One Tin Soldier" (the original theme for Billy Jack) sung by Teresa Laughlin is played over the closing credits.

== Release ==
Billy Jack Goes to Washington was a failure, partly due to distribution problems, and it proved to be Laughlin's last film as a director. Despite being made in 1976, the film never made it into theaters which Laughlin attributed to the film being blackballed under pressure from politicians involved with nuclear power.

Scenes featuring Suzanne Somers and William Wellman Jr. were cut from the DVD release, which is missing 40 minutes. Wellman's cut scenes had him reprising the national guardsman he played in The Trial of Billy Jack, who was now on the board of the Freedom School's directors.

== Reception ==
Variety wrote, "By comparison with the spine-tingling emotionalism and technical brilliance of the Capra version, the pic is much flatter and largely devoid of performing or visual nuances. Most of the humor is gone, and the characters are thinned out, replaced with a rhetorical talkathon interspersed with a few chopsocky sequences." Gary Arnold of The Washington Post described the film as "a talky, static, derivative picture that seems to run on forever," adding, "Laughlin relies so heavily on the original plot and dialogue of 'Mr. Smith Goes to Washington' that one may feel a little embarrassed on his behalf. It's obvious that he's used the Capra film as a crutch rather than an inspiration."

The film has a score of 0% on Rotten Tomatoes based on eight reviews, with an average grade of 2.71 out of 10.

== Lawsuit ==
After investing $18 million on the reputation of the first two Billy Jack movies, Laughlin's backers sued when the production dragged on long enough to overrun his overly optimistic repayment schedule. Laughlin argued his case in full-page ads in Variety, blaming delays on obstruction by Washington insiders. Due to the litigation by Laughlin's creditors the film missed its intended release window and while it did play at some venues, it never achieved wide release resulting in the film's under performance.

== Sequel ==
The unfinished sequel to this movie is The Return of Billy Jack (1985/86).
