= List of 1973 box office number-one films in the United States =

This is a list of films which placed number one at the weekly box office in the United States during 1973.

== Number-one films ==
†	This implies the highest-grossing movie of the year. (Note: Playing weeks represent one film in one theatre for one week)

#	Week ending	Film	Gross	Notes	Ref
1	January 3, 1973	The Poseidon Adventure †	$773,000		
2	January 10, 1973	The Getaway	$874,800	The Getaway reached number one in its third week of release	
3	January 17, 1973	The Poseidon Adventure †	$634,500	The Poseidon Adventure returned to number one in its fifth week of release	
4	January 24, 1973	The Poseidon Adventure †	$649,400		
5	January 31, 1973	The Poseidon Adventure †	$533,300		
6	February 7, 1973	The Poseidon Adventure †	$1,274,500		
7	February 14, 1973	The Poseidon Adventure †	$1,116,400		
8	February 21, 1973	The Poseidon Adventure †	$1,104,100		
9	February 28, 1973	The Poseidon Adventure †	$749,800		
10	March 7, 1973	The Poseidon Adventure †	$596,700		
11	March 14, 1973	The Getaway	$489,280	The Getaway returned to number one in its twelfth week of release	
12	March 21, 1973	The Poseidon Adventure †	$438,100	The Poseidon Adventure returned to number one in its 14th week of release	
13	March 28, 1973	Five Fingers Of Death	$696,000		
14	April 4, 1973	Cabaret	$983,950	Cabaret reached number one in its 59th week of release. It grossed $1,880,000 nationally, a record for Allied Artists	
15	April 11, 1973	Cabaret	$833,700		
16	April 18, 1973	Five Fingers Of Death	$440,500	Five Fingers Of Death returned to number one in its fourth week of release	
17	April 25, 1973	Soylent Green	$674,500		
18	May 2, 1973	Soylent Green	$537,150		
19	May 9, 1973	Fists of Fury	$697,000		
20	May 16, 1973	The Poseidon Adventure †	$363,800	The Poseidon Adventure returned to number one in its 22nd week of release	
21	May 23, 1973	Last Tango in Paris	$384,200	Last Tango In Paris reached number one in its 16th week of release	
22	May 30, 1973	High Plains Drifter	$791,700	High Plains Drifter reached number one in its eighth week on the chart	
23	June 6, 1973	High Plains Drifter	$460,500		
24	June 13, 1973	The Chinese Connection	$694,850	The Chinese Connection reached number one in its second week of release	
25	June 20, 1973	The Hammer of God	$467,000		
26	June 27, 1973	Scarecrow	$627,600	Scarecrow reached number one in its ninth week on the chart	
27	July 4, 1973	Live and Let Die	$1,868,100		
28	July 11, 1973	Live and Let Die	$1,203,690		
29	July 18, 1973	Live and Let Die	$858,900		
30	July 25, 1973	Live and Let Die	$731,400		
31	August 1, 1973	Karado: The Hong Kong Flash	$725,000		
32	August 8, 1973	Live and Let Die	$514,950	Live and Let Die returned to number one in its sixth week of release	
33	August 15, 1973	Coffy	$625,750	Coffy reached number one in its 14th week of release	
34	August 22, 1973	Paper Moon	$911,685	Paper Moon reached number one in its twelfth week on the chart	
35	August 29, 1973	Enter the Dragon	$802,280	Enter the Dragon reached number one in its second week of release	
36	September 5, 1973	Enter the Dragon	$825,300		
37	September 12, 1973	Lady Kung Fu	$699,000		
38	September 19, 1973	The Shanghai Killers	$399,600	Shanghai Killers reached number one in its third week on the chart	
39	September 26, 1973	Dillinger	$412,000	Dillinger reached number one in its 13th week on the chart	
40	October 3, 1973	Deadly China Doll	$400,000		
41	October 10, 1973	Enter the Dragon	$643,200	Enter the Dragon returned to number one in its eighth week of release	
42	October 17, 1973	The Cheerleaders/Fritz the Cat (double bill)	$260,000		
43	October 24, 1973	Paper Moon	$465,800	Paper Moon returned to number one in its 21st week on the chart	
44	October 31, 1973	Billy Jack (reissue)	$2,526,455		
45	November 7, 1973	Billy Jack (reissue)	$2,085,425		
46	November 14, 1973	Billy Jack (reissue)	$1,258,167		
47	November 21, 1973	The Way We Were	$1,345,000	The Way We Were reached number one in its fifth week on the chart	
48	November 28, 1973	The Way We Were	$1,496,100		
49	December 5, 1973	The Way We Were	$967,700		
50	December 12, 1973	The Way We Were	$772,500		
51	December 19, 1973	The Way We Were	$504,100		
52	December 26, 1973	Serpico	$907,102	Serpico reached number one in its third week of release	

== Highest-grossing films ==
Highest-grossing films of 1973 by calendar year gross based on the cities covered by Variety for the weekly charts. (Note: Variety noted that the total grosses that they collated represented about one-third of total U.S. grosses as defined by the US Department of Commerce. The grosses of the top 25 films represented 37% of the total grosses collated. Variety noted that the grosses they reported were based on mostly first-run theatres in major metropolitan markets and that the performance of films from distributors such as Walt Disney Studios and Universal Pictures, which sought out smaller markets and subsequent run marketing strategies for their films, were not fully reflected in their charts.)

Rank	Title	Studio	Playing weeks (Note: Playing weeks represent one film in one theatre for one week)	Gross ($)
1.	The Poseidon Adventure	20th Century Fox	1,229	12,850,359
2.	Billy Jack	Warner Bros.	1,446	9,328,613
3.	Last Tango in Paris	United Artists	804	8,937,300
4.	The Way We Were	Columbia	690	8,184,256
5.	Live and Let Die	United Artists	803	7,739,979
6.	The Devil in Miss Jones	MBL	607	7,681,782
7.	Paper Moon	Paramount	954	7,245,869
8.	The Getaway	National General Pictures	594	5,244,568
9.	The Heartbreak Kid	20th Century Fox	663	4,708,831
10.	Deliverance	Warner Bros.	757	4,626,320
11.	Deep Throat	Damiano	182	4,617,211
12.	Sleuth	20th Century Fox	547	4,528,312
13.	Cabaret	Allied Artists	1,080	4,511,703
14.	Jesus Christ Superstar	Universal	485	4,267,763
15.	The Day of the Jackal	Universal	563	4,234,494
16.	American Graffiti	Universal	411	4,227,708
17.	A Touch of Class	Avco Embassy	527	4,202,988
18.	Enter the Dragon	Warner Bros.	351	3,835,710
19.	Tom Sawyer	United Artists	335	3,688,035
20.	Sounder	20th Century Fox	566	3,675,623
21.	Five Fingers Of Death	Warner Bros.	408	3,638,868
22.	Across 110th Street	United Artists	528	3,560,285
23.	Pete 'n' Tillie	Universal	510	3,432,595
24.	Westworld	Metro-Goldwyn-Mayer	434	3,369,655
25.	Man of La Mancha	United Artists	361	3,192,703

== See also ==
- List of American films — American films by year
- Lists of box office number-one films

== Chronology ==
Preceded by 1972	1973	Succeeded by 1974
