= List of 1974 box office number-one films in the United States =

This is a list of films which placed number one at the weekly box office in the United States during 1974.

== Number-one films ==
†	This implies the highest-grossing movie of the year. (Note: Playing weeks represent one film in one theatre for one week)

#	Week ending	Film	Gross	Notes	Ref
1	January 2, 1974	Papillon	$1,463,300	Papillon reached number one in its second week of release	
2	January 9, 1974	The Exorcist †	$1,007,800	The Exorcist reached number one in its second week of release	
3	January 16, 1974	The Exorcist †	$1,365,500		
4	January 23, 1974	The Exorcist †	$1,532,611		
5	January 30, 1974	The Exorcist †	$1,535,896		
6	February 6, 1974	The Exorcist †	$1,589,500		
7	February 13, 1974	The Exorcist †	$1,369,500		
8	February 20, 1974	The Exorcist †	$1,506,188		
9	February 27, 1974	The Exorcist †	$1,312,000		
10	March 6, 1974	The Exorcist †	$1,182,600		
11	March 13, 1974	The Exorcist †	$1,012,100		
12	March 20, 1974	The Exorcist †	$835,200		
13	March 27, 1974	The Exorcist †	$743,283		
14	April 3, 1974	The Sting	$1,332,300	The Sting reached number one in its 14th week on the chart	
15	April 10, 1974	The Sting	$1,585,100		
16	April 17, 1974	Blazing Saddles	$1,233,700	Blazing Saddles reached number one in its tenth week of release	
17	April 24, 1974	The Sting	$1,145,900	The Sting returned to number one in its 17th week on the chart	
18	May 1, 1974	The Sting	$1,032,900		
19	May 8, 1974	The Sting	$853,300		
20	May 15, 1974	The Sting	$815,000		
21	May 22, 1974	The Sting	$725,500		
22	May 29, 1974	The Great Gatsby	$1,044,438	The Great Gatsby reached number one in its ninth week on the chart	
23	June 5, 1974	The Sting	$759,700	The Sting returned to number one in its 23rd week on the chart	
24	June 12, 1974	The Poseidon Adventure (reissue)	$575,500		
25	June 19, 1974	The Lords of Flatbush	$612,000	The Lords of Flatbush reached number one in its seventh week on the chart	
26	June 26, 1974	The Exorcist †	$4,061,300	The Exorcist returned to number one in its 26th week of release. First film to gross over $4 million in a week in the cities sampled	
27	July 3, 1974	The Exorcist †	$2,547,437		
28	July 10, 1974	The Exorcist †	$1,542,825		
29	July 17, 1974	Herbie Rides Again	$860,200	Herbie Rides Again reached number one in its sixth week on the chart	
30	July 24, 1974	Dirty Mary, Crazy Larry	$869,202	Dirty Mary, Crazy Larry reached number one in its ninth week on the chart	
31	July 31, 1974	For Pete's Sake	$1,015,150	For Pete's Sake reached number one in its fifth week on the chart	
32	August 7, 1974	For Pete's Sake	$661,500		
33	August 14, 1974	Return of the Dragon	$1,168,500	Return of the Dragon reached number one in its third week on the chart	
34	August 21, 1974	That's Entertainment!	$1,307,900	That's Entertainment! reached number one in its 14th week on the chart	
35	August 28, 1974	Chinatown	$1,272,000	Chinatown reached number one in its tenth week on the chart	
36	September 4, 1974	Chinatown	$1,175,900		
37	September 11, 1974	That's Entertainment!	$781,150	That's Entertainment! returned to number one in its 17th week on the chart	
38	September 18, 1974	That's Entertainment!	$524,350		
39	September 25, 1974	Macon County Line	$458,000	Macon County Line reached number one in its twelfth week on the chart	
40	October 2, 1974	The Longest Yard	$513,630	The Longest Yard reached number one in its sixth week on the chart	
41	October 9, 1974	Cabaret (reissue)	$1,345,000		
42	October 16, 1974	Cabaret (reissue)	$687,000		
43	October 23, 1974	Airport 1975	$903,934		
44	October 30, 1974	The Longest Yard	$905,854	The Longest Yard returned to number one in its tenth week on the chart	
45	November 6, 1974	The Longest Yard	$926,200		
46	November 13, 1974	The Longest Yard	$816,500		
47	November 20, 1974	The Trial of Billy Jack	$2,390,000		
48	November 27, 1974	The Trial of Billy Jack	$2,026,000		
49	December 4, 1974	The Trial of Billy Jack	$1,268,200		
50	December 11, 1974	Death Wish	$693,951	Death Wish reached number one in its twentieth week on the chart	
51	December 18, 1974	Death Wish	$600,900		
52	December 25, 1974	The Godfather Part II	$1,450,135	The Godfather Part II reached number one in its second week of release	

== Highest-grossing films ==
Highest-grossing films of 1974 by calendar year gross based on the cities covered by Variety for the weekly charts. (Note: Variety noted that the total grosses that they collated represented about one-third of total U.S. grosses as defined by the US Department of Commerce. The grosses of the top 25 films represented 47% of the total grosses collated. Variety noted that the grosses they reported were based on mostly first-run theatres in major metropolitan markets and that the performance of films from distributors such as Walt Disney Studios, Universal Pictures and American International Pictures, which sought out smaller markets and subsequent run marketing strategies for their films, were not fully reflected in their charts.)

Rank	Title	Studio	Playing weeks (Note: Playing weeks represent one film in one theatre for one week)	Gross ($)
1.	The Exorcist	Warner Bros.	1,522	31,541,887
2.	The Sting	Universal	2,099	26,380,982
3.	Papillon	Allied Artists	2,024	14,732,236
4.	Serpico	Paramount	1,312	10,287,816
5.	American Graffiti	Universal	1,321	9,526,412
6.	That's Entertainment!	United Artists	842	9,368,447
7.	Blazing Saddles	Warner Bros.	1,197	9,234,062
8.	Chinatown	Paramount	994	8,570,732
9.	The Longest Yard	Paramount	1,037	7,604,614
10.	The Great Gatsby	Paramount	848	7,443,580
11.	The Trial of Billy Jack	Taylor-Laughlin	854	6,789,030
12.	Vanishing Wilderness	Pacific International Enterprises	367	6,117,307
13.	Death Wish	Paramount	611	6,089,607
14.	Butch Cassidy and the Sundance Kid	20th Century Fox	878	6,025,067
15.	For Pete's Sake	Columbia	820	5,856,767
16.	Sleeper	United Artists	811	5,852,424
17.	Uptown Saturday Night	Warner Bros.	444	5,413,089
18.	Airport 1975	Universal	394	5,390,607
19.	Magnum Force	Warner Bros.	534	5,309,704
20.	Mame	Warner Bros.	364	4,955,672
21.	Herbie Rides Again	Buena Vista	477	4,769,028
22.	Earthquake	Universal	153	4,535,053
23.	The Way We Were	Columbia	943	4,489,653
24.	Buck and the Preacher	20th Century Fox	685	4,234,429
25.	Return of the Dragon	Bryanston	398	4,223,269

== See also ==
- List of American films — American films by year
- Lists of box office number-one films

== Chronology ==
Preceded by 1973	1974	Succeeded by 1975
