= Wide release =

Widespread release of a film through a nation or other countries

In the motion picture industry, a wide release (short for nationwide release) is a film playing at the same time at cinemas in most markets across a country. This is in contrast to the formerly common practice of a roadshow theatrical release in which a film opens at a few theaters in key cities before circulating among theaters around a country, or a limited release in which a film is booked at fewer theaters (such as "art house" venues) in larger cities in anticipation of lesser commercial appeal. It acts as a grand opening for films. In some cases, a film that sells well in limited release will then "go wide". Since 1994, a wide release in the United States and Canada has been defined by Nielsen EDI as a film released in more than 600 theaters.

The practice emerged as a successful marketing strategy in the 1970s. It became increasingly common in subsequent decades, in parallel with the expansion of the number of screens available at multiplex cinemas. With the switch to digital formats – lowering the added cost of wide release and increasing the opportunity for piracy – "opening wide" has become the default release strategy for big-budget mainstream films, sometimes expanding to include closely spaced wide releases in various countries, or even simultaneous worldwide release.

== History ==
Prior to the 1980s, most feature films initially opened in major cities such as New York, Los Angeles, Paris, and London, with a small set of prints then circulating as a "roadshow" among cinemas regionally over the course of a few months. The number of prints in circulation would be increased only to accommodate demand for highly popular features, which might be "held over" beyond their originally scheduled run. Many of the most successful major releases during this period were handled this way.

In 1944, MGM opened An American Romance in the Cincinnati area in multiple theaters but had negative results. In 1946, David O. Selznick's Duel in the Sun was given a "blitz" release, where it was released simultaneously in a number of theaters in an area or city — as many as 54 theaters in one area at the same time. The "blitz" system had been used "for some years" prior to 1947 in Los Angeles, due to that city's geographic sprawl. Advantages of the new release approach included economies of scale on advertising costs and the fact that "it allows for the old circus technique of 'get out of town before they find out how lousy you are.'" The following year, MGM used a "splash" approach on The Hucksters, opening in 350 theaters before expanding to 1,000 theaters a week later.

By 1949, most film companies had started to move to multiple regional openings on the same day and date in limited areas, known as "saturation booking". Paramount Pictures had it as a long-established policy including on Streets of Laredo and El Paso. RKO opened Mighty Joe Young on 358 theaters in New England and upstate New York and Roseanna McCoy in four states. 20th Century Fox opened It Happens Every Spring and Sand in 300 theaters within a week. Universal Pictures tested it for The Life of Riley and then released Calamity Jane and Sam Bass via 600 dates in Texas and Oklahoma. Warner Bros. opened Colorado Territory in 250 theaters in the Rocky Mountain area. United Artists opened Black Magic in 400 theaters nationwide and Columbia Pictures planned to release Anna Lucasta in 300 theaters nationwide.

In 1952, Terry Turner of RKO, who ran the marketing campaign for Mighty Joe Young, used saturation booking for a reissue of King Kong (1933) and then expanded this concept with Warner Bros.' The Beast from 20,000 Fathoms (1953), planning to have most of its bookings in its first two months, opening in New York and Los Angeles before expanding to 1,422 theaters within the first week.

Joseph E. Levine, a distributor/exhibitor based in Boston who had worked on the "blitz" release of Duel in the Sun, hired Turner and adopted a similar approach on the 1958 US release of the Italian film Attila, quickly moving 90 prints through regional distribution hubs, renting them to mostly low-end theaters where he could book short runs with favorable box office terms. Booking dense concentrations of venues in a region allowed for the effective use of costly local TV and radio spots. Levine was able to generate over $2 million in US box office theatrical rentals with runs averaging only ten days per screen. Warner Bros. then paid him a $300,000 advance to secure the distribution rights to Hercules. Released the following summer with over 600 prints (175 of these played simultaneously in the greater New York City area) with the assistance of Warner's nationwide network of print exchanges, the film secured $4.7 million in rentals.

In 1974, Tom Laughlin gave The Trial of Billy Jack, a sequel to his independently distributed Billy Jack, one of the widest releases to date, opening in 1,200 theatres in the United States on November 13. The following year, Breakout was the first major studio film to go into wide release in its opening week, with Columbia Pictures distributing 1,325 prints nationwide, combined with a heavy national advertising campaign. The following month, Jaws was released in a similar way on 409 screens, expanding to nearly 1,000 by mid-August in conjunction with nationwide advertising. The modest success of Breakout and the blockbuster success of Jaws led other distributors to follow suit with other mass-market films. On June 6, 1978, Jaws II opened in the United States and Canada in 640 theaters the same day that Grease opened in 862 theaters, with both grossing more than $9 million in the opening weekend, showing to distributors the success that could be achieved with such a release strategy. In December 1980, Any Which Way You Can beat the record set by Breakout, opening in a record 1,541 theaters.

The growth in the number and size of multiplexes since the 1980s, increasing the availability of screens with more flexible scheduling, facilitated this strategy and, together with the reduction in the number of movie palaces, saw an end to the roadshow release strategy. In 1984, Beverly Hills Cop was the first film playing simultaneously on more than 2,000 screens in the United States and Canada, in its third weekend in December. In 1990, 14 films were shown on 2,000 screens simultaneously, and in 1993 the number had almost doubled to 23. In 1993, 145 films (41% of films released) received a wide release in the United States and Canada with an average widest point of release of 1,493 engagements with 29% of the films' grosses coming from their opening week.

In May 1996, Mission: Impossible was the first film to be released in over 3,000 theaters in the United States and Canada. Meanwhile, Showgirls (1995) was the first film with an NC-17 rating to have a wide release in the United States, opening in 1,388 theaters. In 1996, 67 films were released in the United States and Canada on more than 2,000 screens and by 1997, the average widest point of release for wide release films in the United States and Canada had reached 1,888 engagements with 37% of the films' grosses coming from their opening week. By 2000, 22 films were released on more than 3,000 screens in the year, while the average widest point of release had increased to 2,228.

In the 1980s and 1990s, the main downside to a wide release was the massive cost of actually creating and shipping release prints to be displayed on all those screens. At a typical cost of about $1,500 per release print, a wide release that opened on 4,000 screens would cost about $6 million. This is why after the turn of the 21st century, film studios started to encourage movie theaters to begin the transition from traditional film projection to digital cinema, thereby relieving studios of the burden of making all those prints.

By 2002, opening globally on the same day became more commonplace, with Spider-Man being released on 7,500 screens at 3,615 theaters in the United States and Canada and 838 prints in 18 other countries. The same month, Star Wars: Episode II – Attack of the Clones opened in 3,161 theaters in the United States and Canada, and in 73 other countries on 5,854 screens. In 2003, 20th Century Fox released X2, the second installment of the X-Men film series, in 3,741 theaters in the United States and Canada, and in 93 markets on 7,316 screens overseas. Later that year, Warner Bros. released the third Matrix film, The Matrix Revolutions, simultaneously in 108 territories on November 5, 2003, at 1400 Greenwich Mean Time on around 18,000 screens with 10,013 prints overseas and in 3,502 theaters in the United States and Canada.

In 2004, Shrek 2 became the first film to open in over 4,000 theaters in the United States and Canada. By 2005, 55 films were released on more than 3,000 screens in the year, while the average opening theater count was 2,591. In 2016, 142 films were released in more than 2,000 theaters in the United States and Canada. In 2019, The Lion King set the record for the widest opening in the United States and Canada, being released in 4,725 theaters before expanding two weeks later to 4,802 theaters. In 2019, 120 films released in the United States and Canada played in 2,000 theaters or more however, following the COVID-19 pandemic, the number reduced to 34 in 2020. The number had increased to 112 by 2025.

=== Films released in the United States and Canada ===
Year	Number of releases	In 2,000 theaters or more	Milestone
1984	169	1	Beverly Hills Cop first film shown in 2,000 theaters simultaneously
1985	191	1	
1986	201	2	
1987	226	1	
1988	239	3	
1989	235	6	
1990	236	14	
1991	253	12	
1992	247	17	
1993	267	23	
1994	259	33	
1995	291	43	
1996	306	67	Mission: Impossible first film to be released in over 3,000 theaters
2004	700	TBD	Shrek 2 first film to open in over 4,000 theaters
2010	651	121	
2011	731	126	
2012	807	124	
2013	826	119	
2014	849	112	
2015	845	119	
2016	855	142	
2017	854	126	
2018	993	117	
2019	910	120	The Lion King released in record 4,725 theaters later expanding to record 4,802 theaters
2020	457	34	
2021	442	72	
2022	502	77	
2023	592	101	
2024	677	94	
2025	667	112	

== Classification ==
Since 1994, a wide release in the United States and Canada has been defined by EDI as a film released in more than 600 theaters. In 1996, Variety considered a wide release as a film with 700 or more playdates or a film in the top 50 markets with at least 500 playdates. New Line distribution president Mitch Goldman called the term a misnomer as he claimed that a film needed to open in more than 800 theaters to be considered a wide release but that such a film might not even play the top cities and that a film could open in the top 50 markets with just 600 prints and be in wide release.

== See also ==
- Art film
- Film release
