= Rolling Thunder (person) =

American religious leader from Arkansas, U.S. (1916–1997)

- Born: John Pope; September 10, 1916; Stamps, Arkansas, US
- Died: January 23, 1997 (aged 80); Elko, Nevada, US
- Citizenship: American
- Known for: New Age spiritualist and spiritual leader of Meta Tantay, community near Carlin, Nevada
- Spouses: Spotted Fawn (died 1984) Carmen Sun Rising (after 1984)
- Children: Mala Spotted Eagle; Buffalo Horse; Ozella Morning Star; Patty Mocking Bird

Rolling Thunder (born John Pope; September 10, 1916 – January 23, 1997) was an American spiritual leader from Nevada, U.S. He was also an activist for Native American rights and the environment.

Born in Stamps, Arkansas, Pope was raised in Oklahoma and later moved to Nevada where he married Helen "Spotted Fawn" Pope.

He worked for much of his adult life as a brakeman for the Southern Pacific Railroad before becoming known for his teachings inspired by Native American traditions, healing, environmental stewardship, and living in harmony with nature.

Rolling Thunder became prominent in the 1960s and 1970s through his work as a teacher and through his relationships with musicians, writers, activists, and spiritual teachers. He became a close friend and collaborator of Mickey Hart, drummer of the Grateful Dead, who recorded Rolling Thunder's invocation on his 1972 solo album Rolling Thunder. Rolling Thunder was also associated with the Billy Jack films and with Native American rights and environmental activism.

Rolling Thunder has been described as a "plastic shaman" and a "pretendian", with little or no genuine connection to the culture or religion he claimed to represent or study. He is mentioned in a number of books on the New Age, 1960s counterculture, cultural appropriation, cultural imperialism, and neoshamanism.

== Early life and family ==
Rolling Thunder was born John Pope on September 10, 1916, in Stamps, Arkansas, and was raised in Oklahoma. His daughter Mala Spotted Eagle Pope wrote that John's father was from the Cherokee Nation and that her mother, Helen "Spotted Fawn" Pope, was Western Shoshone. Spotted Fawn became an important figure in Rolling Thunder's spiritual and community work and was regarded as the "heart" of the Meta Tantay community.

Rolling Thunder and Spotted Fawn married and established their family in Nevada. Through his marriage to Spotted Fawn and his life among Western Shoshone people, Rolling Thunder studied Shoshone traditions and communities in the region. Spotted Fawn was described by Ervin Laszlo as a Western Shoshone woman who became the clan mother and principal organizer of Meta Tantay.

Journalist Dina Gilio-Whitaker (Colville descent) wrote: "According to Steven Crum, [a Western Shoshone professor at the University of California, Davis,] Pope claimed to be a legal advisor to Western Shoshone traditionalists, although there is no record of his having a law or even a college degree." She continues, "He claimed to be Cherokee but had no ties to any of the three federally recognized Cherokee tribes."

== Meta Tantay ==
In the 1970s, Rolling Thunder and Spotted Fawn established Meta Tantay, a commune near Carlin, Nevada. The community occupied approximately 262 acres (1.06 km^{2}) and operated for roughly a decade, from the mid-1970s until about 1985. Its purpose was to provide a place where Native and non-Native people could learn about Rolling Thunder's and Spotted Fawn's perspectives on Native American traditions, environmental stewardship, and ways of living in greater harmony with the natural world.

The land for Meta Tantay was purchased with financial assistance from Mickey Hart and other members and supporters of the Grateful Dead. According to psychologist Stanley Krippner, who visited Meta Tantay on several occasions, the community occupied 262 acres and attracted visitors including Joan Baez, Joni Mitchell, Buckminster Fuller, Candice Bergen, and Muhammad Ali. Other accounts describe visits by Tibetan monks, peace activists, musicians, and people from Europe and North America.

Meta Tantay was intended to be both a functioning community and a place of education. Residents worked to make the land productive through agriculture and animal husbandry. A contemporary 1981 interview with Rolling Thunder published in Mother Earth News described an orchard, crops, livestock, honeybees, reforestation efforts, irrigation, and efforts to restore the land's ecological health. Rolling Thunder described the community's purpose as developing skills that combined traditional knowledge with modern abilities needed for sustainable living.

The community also operated a schoolhouse for children living at Meta Tantay. The educational program incorporated conventional academic instruction with lessons about Native American history, plants, animals, and the natural environment. Children were taught to understand human beings as part of the natural world and to live in greater harmony with the Earth.

Meta Tantay became a gathering place for people interested in Native American spirituality, environmentalism, alternative education, and communal living. Rolling Thunder served as its principal spiritual teacher, while Spotted Fawn played a central organizational and community role.

== Teachings and activism ==
Rolling Thunder was a frequent speaker at colleges and universities, where he discussed his views about Native American traditions, spirituality, environmental stewardship, and contemporary issues affecting Indigenous peoples. In the 1970s and 1980s, he gave talks and healing demonstrations at the University of California, Berkeley, the University of Texas at Austin, and the Association for Humanistic Psychology in San Francisco. He also spoke at the World Symposium on Humanity in Vancouver, British Columbia, and undertook a speaking tour of Europe that included Austria, Sweden, and Denmark.

A 1970s listing in the Cornell Chronicle advertised a recording of Rolling Thunder speaking at the World Symposium as a campus program at Cornell University. He also participated in international gatherings to speak about peace, Indigenous rights, and humanity's relationship with the Earth. In 1978, he was invited to speak at the World Symposium on Humanities in London; when he was unable to travel, his presentation was recorded for transmission to the international gathering.

His public work brought his interpretations of Native American perspectives on land, ecology, spirituality, and cultural survival to audiences outside Native communities, including students, activists, and international audiences. He was also involved in activism concerning Native American rights and environmental issues. His environmental activism included opposition to the destruction of pinyon pine forests on Native lands in Nevada and efforts to protect Native American land and cultural resources.

== Relationship with Mickey Hart and the Grateful Dead ==
Rolling Thunder developed a close friendship with Mickey Hart during the early 1970s. Hart recorded Rolling Thunder's morning prayer and used the recording at the beginning of his 1972 solo album Rolling Thunder. Their friendship continued for many years, and Hart and other members of the Grateful Dead helped provide financial support for the establishment of Meta Tantay.

== Death ==
Spotted Fawn died in 1984. Rolling Thunder subsequently experienced declining health and died on January 23, 1997, in Elko, Nevada. He suffered from diabetes and emphysema during his later years.

== Reception and controversy ==
Rolling Thunder's identity and status as a Native American medicine man have been the subject of debate. Some writers and scholars have questioned the extent to which his teachings corresponded to specific tribal traditions and have characterized him as a "plastic shaman," a term used critically to describe non-Native or insufficiently authorized practitioners who present themselves as Native American spiritual authorities.

Doug Boyd emphasized his Cherokee ancestry, his relationship with the Western Shoshone community, his years of teaching, and the community he established at Meta Tantay.

== Bibliography ==
- Boyd, Doug (1974). Rolling Thunder: An Exploration into the Powers of an American Indian Medicine Man. Random House / Robert Briggs Associates. ISBN 9780394488868. — Foreword by Dee Brown
- Lake-Thom, Bobby; Lake, Robert G. (1991). Native Healer: Initiation Into an Ancient Art. Quest Books. ISBN 978-0-8356-0667-7. — Foreword by Rolling Thunder

== Discography ==
- Rolling Thunder – Mickey Hart (1972)
- Rolling Thunder Speaks: the Owyhee Confrontation. Los Angeles: Pacifica Tape Library. 1969. (audiobook) — also contains a preliminary list of grievances by the Native Americans Oscar Johnny and Craig Carpenter.
- From Alcatraz to Chicago. (audiobook) - with John Trudell and Michael Chosa

== Filmography ==
- Tom Laughlin (director), Rolling Thunder (actor) (1971). The Trial of Billy Jack.
- Rolling Thunder (director) (February 22, 2005). Rolling Thunder: Healer of Meta Tantay. UFO TV.
