= List of 1975 box office number-one films in the United States =

This is a list of films, which placed number one at the weekly box office in the United States during 1975.

== Number-one films ==
†	This implies the highest-grossing movie of the year.

#	Week ending	Film	Gross	Notes	Ref
1	January 1, 1975	The Godfather Part II	$1,872,700		
2	January 8, 1975	The Godfather Part II	$1,473,000		
3	January 15, 1975	The Towering Inferno	$1,158,400	The Towering Inferno reached number one in its fourth week on the chart	
4	January 22, 1975	Murder on the Orient Express	$1,011,700	Murder on the Orient Express reached number one in its eighth week on the chart	
5	January 29, 1975	Murder on the Orient Express	$1,133,300		
6	February 5, 1975	Young Frankenstein	$1,130,440	Young Frankenstein reached number one in its seventh week on the chart	
7	February 12, 1975	The Towering Inferno	$1,171,579	The Towering Inferno returned to number one in its eighth week on the chart	
8	February 19, 1975	The Towering Inferno	$1,580,114		
9	February 26, 1975	The Towering Inferno	$1,112,071		
10	March 5, 1975	The Towering Inferno	$964,550		
11	March 12, 1975	The Towering Inferno	$1,003,132		
12	March 19, 1975	Funny Lady	$1,072,254	Funny Lady grossed $2,254,3851 in its first five days nationally	
13	March 26, 1975	The Godfather Part II	$1,357,143	The Godfather Part II returned to number one in its 15th week of release	
14	April 2, 1975	The Godfather Part II	$1,509,856		
15	April 9, 1975	The Godfather Part II	$1,184,325		
16	April 16, 1975	The Godfather Part II	$1,161,950		
17	April 23, 1975	The Godfather Part II	$792,400		
18	April 30, 1975	Alice Doesn't Live Here Anymore	$713,250	Alice Doesn't Live Here Anymore reached number one in its 14th week on the chart	
19	May 7, 1975	Alice Doesn't Live Here Anymore	$668,700		
20	May 14, 1975	The Happy Hooker	$475,000		
21	May 21, 1975	The Happy Hooker	$321,500		
22	May 28, 1975	Breakout	$1,701,796	Breakout grossed $8.2 million in its first six days nationally	
23	June 4, 1975	Breakout	$1,263,016	Breakout grossed $12,711,224 in its first two weeks nationally	
24	June 11, 1975	Shampoo	$575,500	Shampoo reached number one in its 17th week on the chart	
25	June 18, 1975	The Return of the Pink Panther	$889,200	The Return of the Pink Panther reached number one in its fourth week of release	
26	June 25, 1975	Jaws †	$2,590,531	Jaws grossed $7,061,513 nationally from all markets in the weekend ended June 22, setting the opening weekend record	
27	July 2, 1975	Jaws †	$4,317,542	Jaws grossed $6,810,584 nationally from all markets in the weekend ended June 29	
28	July 9, 1975	Jaws †	$4,029,365	Jaws grossed $6,443,138 nationally from all markets in the weekend ended July 6	
29	July 16, 1975	Jaws †	$3,818,556	Jaws grossed $5,954,787 nationally from all markets in the weekend ended July 13	
30	July 23, 1975	Jaws †	$3,078,793	Jaws grossed $5,229,811 nationally from all markets in the weekend ended July 20	
31	July 30, 1975	Jaws †	$2,687,163	Jaws grossed $6,150,000 nationally from all markets in the weekend ended July 27	
32	August 6, 1975	Jaws †	$2,225,509		
33	August 13, 1975	Jaws †	$2,260,793		
34	August 20, 1975	Jaws †	$1,968,605		
35	August 27, 1975	Jaws †	$1,913,651		
36	September 3, 1975	Jaws †	$1,626,685		
37	September 10, 1975	Jaws †	$1,422,753		
38	September 17, 1975	Jaws †	$972,589		
39	September 24, 1975	Jaws †	$729,993		
40	October 1, 1975	Love and Death	$588,300	Love and Death reached number one in its 16th week on the chart	
41	October 8, 1975	The Master Gunfighter	$606,350		
42	October 15, 1975	Hard Times	$1,141,605		
43	October 22, 1975	Three Days of the Condor	$1,071,168	Three Days of the Condor reached number one in its fourth week on the chart	
44	October 29, 1975	Three Days of the Condor	$963,633		
45	November 5, 1975	Three Days of the Condor	$847,609		
46	November 12, 1975	Let's Do It Again	$726,010	Let's Do It Again reached number one in its fifth week on the chart	
47	November 19, 1975	Three Days of the Condor	$635,425	Three Days of the Condor returned to number one in its eighth week on the chart	
48	November 26, 1975	Let's Do It Again	$938,044	Let's Do It Again returned to number one in its seventh week on the chart	
49	December 3, 1975	Let's Do It Again	$1,154,700		
50	December 10, 1975	Let's Do It Again	$614,200		
51	December 17, 1975	Let's Do It Again	$391,300		
52	December 24, 1975	The Killer Elite	$849,000		
53	December 31, 1975	Dog Day Afternoon	$1,931,500	Dog Day Afternoon reached number one in its 14th week on the chart	

== See also ==
- List of American films — American films by year
- Lists of box office number-one films

== Chronology ==
Preceded by 1974	1975	Succeeded by 1976
