= Delores Taylor =

American actress

- Taylor in 1978
- Born: Delores Judith Taylor; September 27, 1932; Winner, South Dakota, U.S.
- Died: March 23, 2018 (aged 85); Los Angeles, California
- Occupations: Actress; screenwriter; producer
- Years active: 1965–1977
- Spouse: Tom Laughlin (m. 1954; died 2013)
- Children: 3

Delores Judith Taylor (September 27, 1932 – March 23, 2018) was an American film actor, screenwriter, and producer, known for her roles in the Billy Jack films of the 1970s.

== Life and career ==
Taylor was born in 1932 in Winner, South Dakota, and grew up near the Rosebud Indian Reservation. Her father, Harry Taylor, was a postmaster, who ran a post office that was frequented by Native Americans. Her mother, Ann Nelson, was a homemaker.

She met actor Tom Laughlin while a student at the University of South Dakota in 1953, and married him while she was a graphic artist on October 15, 1954. They borrowed a car and moved to Los Angeles in 1955. They had three children: Frank, Teresa, and Christina. Her daughter Teresa is a fashion designer.

Together the couple developed the character of "Billy Jack", who first appeared in the 1967 film The Born Losers. They followed that with Billy Jack in 1971, then The Trial of Billy Jack in 1974, and Billy Jack Goes to Washington in 1976. Taylor and Laughlin played the starring roles in the latter three films. Taylor co-produced both The Born Losers and the 1975 film The Master Gunfighter.

She was nominated for a Golden Globe for New Star of the Year – Actress in 1972.

== Death ==
Taylor died on March 23, 2018, of natural causes at the Motion Picture & Television Country House and Hospital in Los Angeles, California, aged 85.

== Filmography ==
Year	Title	Role	Notes
1967	The Born Losers	Pedestrian with Children / Opening Off Screen Narrator	Uncredited
1971	Billy Jack	Jean Roberts	
1974	The Trial of Billy Jack	Jean Roberts	
1976	Billy Jack Goes to Washington	Jean Roberts	
1986	The Return of Billy Jack	Jean Roberts	(final film role)
