= List of 1976 box office number-one films in the United States =

This is a list of films which placed number one at the weekly box office in the United States during 1976.

== Number-one films ==
Rocky became the highest-grossing film of 1976. But its reign at the #1 spot occurred in early 1977, it never reached #1 during 1976.

#	Week ending	Film	Gross	Notes	Ref
1	January 7, 1976	Dog Day Afternoon	$1,488,800		
2	January 14, 1976	The Adventures of the Wilderness Family	$1,375,799	The Adventures of the Wilderness Family reached number one in its third week on the chart	
3	January 21, 1976	Dog Day Afternoon	$880,306	Dog Day Afternoon returned to number one in its 17th week on the chart	
4	January 28, 1976	The Sunshine Boys	$680,119	The Sunshine Boys reached number one in its twelfth week on the chart	
5	February 4, 1976	The Sunshine Boys	$604,423		
6	February 11, 1976	One Flew Over the Cuckoo's Nest	$592,200	One Flew Over the Cuckoo's Nest reached number one in its twelfth week on the chart	
7	February 18, 1976	One Flew Over the Cuckoo's Nest	$844,199		
8	February 25, 1976	One Flew Over the Cuckoo's Nest	$1,946,036		
9	March 3, 1976	One Flew Over the Cuckoo's Nest	$1,709,906		
10	March 10, 1976	One Flew Over the Cuckoo's Nest	$1,684,971		
11	March 17, 1976	One Flew Over the Cuckoo's Nest	$1,334,384		
12	March 24, 1976	Taxi Driver	$1,340,430	Taxi Driver reached number one in its sixth week on the chart	
13	March 31, 1976	One Flew Over the Cuckoo's Nest	$1,371,142	One Flew Over the Cuckoo's Nest returned to number one in its 19th week on the chart	
14	April 7, 1976	One Flew Over the Cuckoo's Nest	$1,936,408		
15	April 14, 1976	All the President's Men	$1,947,300	All the President's Men grossed $4,565,826 nationally in its first 3 days and $7,016,001 for the week	
16	April 21, 1976	All the President's Men	$1,909,844		
17	April 28, 1976	The Bad News Bears	$1,438,400	The Bad News Bears reached number one in its third week of release	
18	May 5, 1976	All the President's Men	$1,336,364	All the President's Men returned to number one in its fourth week of release	
19	May 12, 1976	All the President's Men	$1,092,273		
20	May 19, 1976	All the President's Men	$839,617		
21	May 26, 1976	The Missouri Breaks	$1,616,000		
22	June 2, 1976	The Missouri Breaks	$1,336,060		
23	June 9, 1976	The Missouri Breaks	$661,495		
24	June 16, 1976	Mother, Jugs & Speed	$889,200	Mother, Jugs & Speed reached number one in its third week of release	
25	June 23, 1976	Midway	$1,825,600	Midway grossed $4,356,666 nationally from all markets in the weekend ended June 20	
26	June 30, 1976	The Omen	$2,490,600	The Omen grossed $4,273,886 nationally from all markets in the weekend ended June 27, 20th Century Fox's biggest opening weekend at that time	
27	July 7, 1976	The Omen	$2,341,182		
28	July 14, 1976	The Omen	$2,151,161		
29	July 21, 1976	The Omen	$1,866,975		
30	July 28, 1976	The Omen	$1,194,577		
31	August 4, 1976	The Exorcist (reissue)	$950,000		
32	August 11, 1976	Silent Movie	$1,837,983	Silent Movie reached number one in its sixth week on the chart	
33	August 18, 1976	Silent Movie	$1,385,124		
34	August 25, 1976	Silent Movie	$1,175,393		
35	September 1, 1976	Silent Movie	$1,063,567		
36	September 8, 1976	Survive!	$1,485,362	Survive! reached number one in its sixth week on the chart	
37	September 15, 1976	Obsession	$638,946	Obsession reached number one in its sixth week on the chart	
38	September 22, 1976	Obsession	$424,979		
39	September 29, 1976	Alice in Wonderland	$354,207	Alice in Wonderland reached number one in its 13th week on the chart	
40	October 6, 1976	Burnt Offerings	$683,100		
41	October 13, 1976	Alice in Wonderland	$1,009,636	Alice in Wonderland returned to number one in its 15th week on the chart	
42	October 20, 1976	Marathon Man	$1,071,500	Marathon Man reached number one in its second week of release	
43	October 27, 1976	Marathon Man	$952,871		
44	November 3, 1976	Marathon Man	$715,213		
45	November 10, 1976	The Front	$686,563	The Front reached number one in its sixth week on the chart	
46	November 17, 1976	Two-Minute Warning	$1,084,800		
47	November 24, 1976	Carrie	$1,155,200	Carrie reached number one in its third week of release	
48	December 1, 1976	Carrie	$1,283,735		
49	December 8, 1976	Carrie	$921,765		
50	December 15, 1976	Carrie	$641,909		
51	December 22, 1976	King Kong	$2,710,649	King Kong grossed $7,023,921 nationally from all markets in the weekend ended December 19, Paramount Pictures' biggest opening weekend at that time, and set the record for a December opening	
52	December 29, 1976	King Kong	$3,347,758		

== See also ==
- List of American films — American films by year
- Lists of box office number-one films

== Chronology ==
Preceded by 1975	1976	Succeeded by 1977
