= List of 1971 box office number-one films in the United States =

This is a list of films which placed number one at the weekly box office in the United States during 1971.

== Number-one films ==
†	This implies the highest-grossing movie of the year. (Note: Playing weeks represent one film in one theatre for one week)

#	Week ending	Film	Gross	Notes	Ref
1	January 6, 1971	Love Story †	$800,400	For the weekend ending January 3, 1971, Love Story grossed $2,493,167 from all markets in the United States and Canada.	
2	January 13, 1971	Love Story †	$910,500	For the weekend ending January 10, 1971, Love Story grossed $2,405,809 from all markets in the United States and Canada.	
3	January 20, 1971	Love Story †	$926,100		
4	January 27, 1971	Love Story †	$892,200		
5	February 3, 1971	Love Story †	$815,900		
6	February 10, 1971	The Owl and the Pussycat	$1,051,428	The Owl and the Pussycat reached number one in its 14th week of release	
7	February 17, 1971	Love Story †	$1,191,227	Love Story returned to number one in its ninth week of release	
8	February 24, 1971	Love Story †	$908,800		
9	March 3, 1971	Love Story †	$821,500		
10	March 10, 1971	Love Story †	$673,300		
11	March 17, 1971	Love Story †	$634,600		
12	March 24, 1971	Love Story †	$599,100		
13	March 31, 1971	Husbands	$556,000	Husbands reached number one in its 16th week of release	
14	April 7, 1971	A New Leaf	$535,950	A New Leaf reached number one in its fourth week of release	
15	April 14, 1971	Cold Turkey	$715,833	Cold Turkey reached number one in its tenth week of release	
16	April 21, 1971	Patton/MASH (double bill)	$740,421		
17	April 28, 1971	Patton/MASH (double bill)	$567,500		
18	May 5, 1971	Patton/MASH (double bill)	$373,100		
19	May 12, 1971	Bob & Carol & Ted & Alice/Cactus Flower (double bill)	$340,000		
20	May 19, 1971	Sweet Sweetback's Baadasssss Song	$357,500	Sweet Sweetback's Baadasssss Song reached number one in its seventh week on the chart	
21	May 26, 1971	Sweet Sweetback's Baadasssss Song	$421,000		
22	June 2, 1971	A New Leaf	$778,100	A New Leaf returned to number one in its 12th week on the chart	
23	June 9, 1971	Gimme Shelter	$283,027	Gimme Shelter reached number one in its 21st week on the chart	
24	June 16, 1971	Lawrence of Arabia (reissue)	$549,500	Lawrence of Arabia reissue reached number one in its 14th week on the chart	
25	June 23, 1971	Lawrence of Arabia (reissue)	$255,000		
26	June 30, 1971	Love Story †	$2,242,900	Love Story returned to number one after 28 weeks of release. First film to gross over $2 million in a week in the cities sampled	
27	July 7, 1971	Love Story †	$1,116,951		
28	July 14, 1971	Love Story †	$672,207		
29	July 21, 1971	Summer of '42	$666,435	Summer of '42 reached number one in its 13th week on the chart	
30	July 28, 1971	Willard	$1,329,970	Willard reached number one in its sixth week on the chart	
31	August 4, 1971	Willard	$755,500		
32	August 11, 1971	Klute	$596,000	Klute reached number one in its seventh week on the chart	
33	August 18, 1971	The Andromeda Strain	$479,000	The Andromeda Strain reached number one in its 20th week on the chart	
34	August 25, 1971	The Anderson Tapes	$654,200	The Anderson Tapes reached number one in its tenth week on the chart	
35	September 1, 1971	The Omega Man	$500,000	The Omega Man reached number one in its fifth week on the chart	
36	September 8, 1971	Sweet Sweetback's Baadasssss Song	$387,000	Sweet Sweetback's Baadasssss Song returned to number one in its 19th week on the chart	
37	September 15, 1971	Sweet Sweetback's Baadasssss Song	$283,000		
38	September 22, 1971	McCabe & Mrs. Miller	$343,652	McCabe & Mrs. Miller reached number one in its eleventh week on the chart	
39	September 29, 1971	The Stewardesses	$450,070	The Stewardesses reached number one in its 43rd week on the chart	
40	October 6, 1971	The Stewardesses	$526,216		
41	October 13, 1971	The Stewardesses	$454,700		
42	October 20, 1971	The Omega Man	$500,000	The Omega Man returned to number one in its tenth week on the chart	
43	October 27, 1971	The Organization	$646,500		
44	November 3, 1971	The Organization	$473,600		
45	November 10, 1971	Cry Uncle!	$502,500	Cry Uncle! reached number one in its twelfth week on the chart	
46	November 17, 1971	The French Connection	$489,600	The French Connection reached number one in its sixth week on the chart	
47	November 24, 1971	The French Connection	$776,050		
48	December 1, 1971	The French Connection	$914,700		
49	December 8, 1971	The French Connection	$628,078		
50	December 15, 1971	The French Connection	$508,207		
51	December 22, 1971	Diamonds Are Forever	$1,521,800	For the weekend ending December 19, 1971, Diamonds Are Forever grossed $1,569,249 from all markets in the United States and Canada.	
52	December 29, 1971	Diamonds Are Forever	$2,033,500		

== Highest-grossing films ==
Highest-grossing films of 1971 by calendar year gross based on the cities covered by Variety for the weekly charts. (Note: Variety noted that the total grosses that they collated represented about 30% of total US grosses as defined by the US Department of Commerce. The grosses of the top 25 films represented 37% of the total grosses collated. Variety noted that the grosses they reported were based on mostly first-run theatres in major metropolitan markets and that the performance of films from distributors such as Walt Disney Studios and Universal Pictures, which sought out smaller markets and subsequent run marketing strategies for their films, were not fully reflected in their charts.)

Rank	Title	Studio	Playing weeks (Note: Playing weeks represent one film in one theatre for one week)	Gross ($)
1.	Love Story	Paramount	1,163	19,303,390
2.	Summer of '42	Warner Bros.	936	7,704,068
3.	Little Big Man	National General Pictures	664	6,552,922
4.	Carnal Knowledge	Avco Embassy	463	6,280,736
5.	The Owl and the Pussycat	Columbia	656	6,046,961
6.	The Stewardesses	Sherpix	522	5,712,562
7.	Ryan's Daughter	Metro-Goldwyn-Mayer	587	5,371,146
8.	The French Connection	20th Century Fox	279	5,009,791
9.	The Anderson Tapes	Columbia	323	4,766,507
10.	A New Leaf	Paramount	348	4,670,247
11.	Willard	CRC	271	4,599,340
12.	Tora! Tora! Tora!	20th Century Fox	439	3,934,026
13.	Shaft	Metro-Goldwyn-Mayer	257	3,916,721
14.	Klute	Warner Bros.	408	3,686,063
15.	Diamonds Are Forever	United Artists	145	3,588,437
16.	Plaza Suite	Paramount	285	3,525,483
17.	The Andromeda Strain	Universal	333	3,431,440
18.	Five Easy Pieces	Columbia	535	3,237,844
19.	Fiddler on the Roof	United Artists	82	3,204,410
20.	Song of Norway	CRC	351	3,130,729
21.	Bananas	United Artists	396	3,016,073
22.	The Love Machine	Columbia	244	3,007,834
23.	Sweet Sweetback's Baadasssss Song	Cinemation	179	2,994,704
24.	Cold Turkey	United Artists	421	2,857,938
25.	Kotch	CRC	407	2,762,265

== See also ==
- List of American films — American films by year
- Lists of box office number-one films

== Chronology ==
Preceded by 1970	1971	Succeeded by 1972
