= The Trial of Billy Jack =

1974 American Western action film by Tom Laughlin

- Theatrical release poster
- Directed by: Tom Laughlin
- Written by: Frank Christina; Teresa Christina (pen names for Tom Laughlin and Delores Taylor)
- Produced by: Joe Cramer
- Starring: Delores Taylor; Tom Laughlin
- Cinematography: Jack A. Marta
- Edited by: Michael Economou; George Grenville; Michael Karr; Jules Nayfack; Tom Rolf
- Music by: Elmer Bernstein
- Distributed by: Warner Bros. Taylor-Laughlin
- Release date: November 13, 1974
- Running time: 173 minutes
- Country: United States
- Language: English
- Budget: $2.5 million

The Trial of Billy Jack is a 1974 American Western action film starring Delores Taylor and Tom Laughlin. It is the sequel to the 1971 film Billy Jack and the third film overall in the series.

Directed by Laughlin, the film has a running time of nearly three hours. Although commercially successful, it was panned by critics. The film was included in the book The Fifty Worst Films of All Time.

== Plot ==
The entire story is told through flashbacks by teacher Jean Roberts from her hospital bed after a shooting has taken place.

Billy Jack goes to court facing an involuntary manslaughter charge stemming from events in the earlier film. During Billy's trial, he mentions the 1968 My Lai massacre and recalls, in a flashback scene, witnessing a similar incident while serving in Vietnam. He is found guilty and sentenced to a prison term for a minimum of five years. Meanwhile, the kids at the Freedom School—an experimental school for runaways and troubled youth on a Native American reservation in Arizona—vow to rebuild the school. They raise funds and acquire a new building, eventually starting their own newspaper and television station.

Inspired by Nader's Raiders, they begin using the newspaper and TV station to conduct investigative reporting, angering several politicians and townspeople in the process with their exposés.

The school's activities range from having their own search and rescue team to artistic endeavors such as a marching band and belly dancing. The school hosts a large marching-band contest and arts festival, called "1984 Is Closer Than You Think," to raise money for the school.

Billy Jack is released from prison and, trying to reconnect with his spiritual beliefs, begins a series of lengthy vision quests. He also meets a hapkido master in Han. He becomes involved with a radical group on the reservation that opposes the federal effort to cease recognition of their tribe and the surrender of their tribal lands to local developers. When one of the tribal members is arrested for poaching deer on what was formerly tribal land, the school comes to his defense.

The school begins to hold hearings on the rights of the native people and child abuse. The school defies a court order to return Danny (a boy at the school) to his father who had abused the boy and cut off his hand. The FBI begins visiting the school and taps their phones.

As tensions mount between the school and the people in the nearby town, a mysterious explosion at the school knocks their television station off the air. Debate rages on with the students on whether to meet brute power with nonviolence or with brute power itself. Jean tries to resist giving advice to the students so as to let them decide their actions. The governor calls a state of emergency and mobilizes the National Guard, and a curfew is established in town. The students respond by holding a parade in the town in violation of the curfew. On the way back to the school, their bus breaks down and local townspeople confront the students and threaten to set their bus on fire.

Billy Jack appears during the incident to protect the students and then comes to the attempted rescue of a tribal member who is being harassed and nearly beaten to death at a local dance in town. Billy Jack and fellow karate master Han take on the gang of people assaulting the man. When Posner threatens to arrest them for assault with a gun, he shoots Han in the chest. Billy managed to use his karate on Posner, who gets killed by the kick to the throat. Han is taken to the hospital. The sheriff tries to take in Billy Jack, but the students close in on the car and cause a riot that allows him to get away.

The National Guard is then stationed around the school (under orders by the Governor to stay there until Billy Jack is put under arrest). Billy Jack agrees to surrender as long as the soldiers leave the school. Later that night, the State Police take him outside the car to "take a leak" while giving him a gun despite his handcuffs for the dark. Despite being shot in the back, Billy Jack escapes into the dark only to return for keys to get away. He attempts to recuperate with the natives and calls on them to help while writhing in pain.

Jean decides to intervene during a school meeting and tells the students about the love that should not be extinguished by retaliatory violence. Danny, now with a hook on his missing hand, is assisted by Carol in delivering a brief song. Later on, the students burn a supply shack for a bonfire. Jean tries to call the Governor to call back the militia (told to fire one warning shot and then one shot to kill if confronted), if she can pull the students back into the school.

Meanwhile, the Guard make a move when they think they see a sniper after hearing a shot. This was actually a warning shot fired by someone upon hearing chants of "Sieg Heil". Under orders to open fire on the students, the Guard and state troopers kill four and wound hundreds more, including Jean, Danny and Carol. All of a sudden, an array of Natives (including the tribal chief) with torches come from behind the area along with the local sheriff. Several of the troops throw their weapons down while the militia notifies the Governor.

Now back in the bed, Jean muses about the freedoms that had been present in the school along with peace and harmony. When asked if she would bring back the school, she notes the townspeople seemed to enjoy the massacre. Billy Jack, lapsed into a deep sleep seemingly with the loss of will to live, wonders why he is not deemed ready to be on the other side. The spirits tell him that he has not learned enough to be on the other side permanently because he does not value his visions. In theory, if he changes his ways and finds inner peace, people will see it and find a good example set by him. Billy Jack is told he will only find his spiritual guide by practicing the fourth way that would have him stop covering his weakness with violence. Billy Jack awakens to Jean, who is now in a wheelchair, and tells her to come back to the school. A selection of students with casts and limps tell her about how they will march to build the school again and work harder on their exposés. Jean is wheeled in and cries upon the sight of so many students present.

Some may feel this picture is too violent... but the real massacres which inspired this fictionalized version were a thousand-fold more violent for those innocent people who were its victims... Rather than direct anger at this re-creation... please channel your energy toward those officials who either ordered, condoned, or failed to take action against these events...and perhaps towards ourselves for also turning our backs and letting such events occur unchallenged. All we are saying is...give peace a chance...

— End title card from the film.

== Cast ==
- Tom Laughlin as Billy Jack
- Delores Taylor as Jean Roberts
- Victor Izay as Doc
- Teresa Kelly as Carol (credited as Teresa Laughlin)
- Sara Lane as Russell
- Geo Anne Sosa as Joanne
- Lynn Baker as Lynn
- Riley Hill as Posner
- Sparky Watt as Sheriff Cole
- Gus Greymountain as Blue Elk
- Sacheen Littlefeather as Patsy Littlejohn
- Michael Bolland as Danny
- Jack Stanley as Grandfather
- Bong-Soo Han as Master Han
- Rolling Thunder as Thunder Mountain
- William Wellman Jr. as National Guardsman

== Production ==
Part of the film was shot in the Coronado National Forest along with Monument Valley in Utah. Several Arizona tribal nations cooperated on the film, such as the Navajo, Papago, Havasupai, and Pima, who are each listed in the end credits under special thanks. Bong Soo Han, who had done some of the harder stunts of the previous film, has a supporting role here.

== Release ==
The film opened on November 13, 1974 in one of the widest releases of the time. It opened in an additional 150 theaters two days later, totaling more than 1,000 theaters in its opening week, including 180 four wall distribution locations in New York, Philadelphia and Phoenix. The wide release was accompanied by a $3 million advertising campaign in the opening week. As per an agreement with Laughlin and Taylor, after six weeks of release, Warner Bros. took over distribution of the film, starting from Christmas Day.

== Reception ==
=== Box office ===
In its opening five days, the film grossed $9 million and was number one at the U.S. box office, where it remained for three weeks. By 1976 the film had earned $6,716,000 in theatrical rentals in the United States and Canada. Its international take was very small; Laughlin suggested that American government agencies conspired to force the film to be "banned in almost every country in the world" to hide its "scorching exposés" from foreign audiences, though he admitted that he had no supporting evidence.

=== Critical ===
The film was a commercial success upon its release in theaters, but met with a harsh reaction from critics.

Vincent Canby of The New York Times called it "three hours of naiveté merchandised and marketed with the not-so-innocent vengeance that I associate with religious movements that take leases on places like the Houston Astrodome."

Variety wrote that the film was "badly in need of trimming its 170-minutes running time" and that Laughlin sometimes seemed to be "only a visiting guest star, since he does not figure in what seems to be reels of irrelevant school action. It is only when he is on-camera that the picture picks up, a commanding figure whose low-key characterization adds to the brilliance of his performance."

Gene Siskel of the Chicago Tribune gave the film one star out of four and called it "gross, misleading and a run-on bore," writing that "whereas the original had moments of genuine humor and refreshing improvisation, 'The Trial of Billy Jack' comes on as totally committed to establishing half-truths. In reality, both My Lai and Kent State are testaments to the danger of arming young men and placing them in combat situations. But 'The Trial of Billy Jack' twists those facts so as to make the killings a direct policy statement of the national government."

Charles Champlin of the Los Angeles Times described the film as "one of the longest, slowest, most pretentious and self-congratulatory ego trips ever put to film. The running time is an excruciating three hours, which make you wonder what the five count 'em five credited editors did for their pay."

Gary Arnold of The Washington Post called it "such a rambling, maudlin, sanctimonious rehash of its phenomenally successful predecessor that one can at least hope for a few defections among the legions of young fans who evidently thrilled to the self-flattering gospel according to 'Billy Jack,'" concluding, "Laughlin's point of view may be militantly liberal, but his artistic methods are reactionary in the extreme."

Pauline Kael of The New Yorker declared, "This film probably represents the most extraordinary display of sanctimonious self-aggrandizement the screen has ever known."

Donald J. Mayerson wrote in Cue that "this sequel proved more of a trial for me than it was for Billy." Leonard Maltin's film guide assigned its lowest possible grade of BOMB and called the film "Laughable" until the final massacre scene that rendered its peaceful message "ludicrous."

In a retrospective review, Donald Guarisco of AllMovie wrote: "Ultimately, most viewers are likely to be baffled by The Trial of Billy Jack, and it can only be recommended to B-movie fans with a hearty constitution...it's a mess, but it's a fascinating mess."

When the film was reissued for another theatrical run in the spring of 1975, an accompanying newspaper ad campaign attacked critics as being out of touch with the tastes of mass audiences.

The Trial of Billy Jack was included among the selections in the 1978 book The Fifty Worst Films of All Time.

== Legacy ==
The film was followed by Billy Jack Goes to Washington in 1977, which never saw a widespread theatrical release. A fifth film, The Return of Billy Jack, filmed in 1985–1986, was never completed.

== See also ==
- List of American films of 1974
