= List of 1972 box office number-one films in the United States =

This is a list of films which placed number one at the weekly box office in the United States during 1972.

== Number-one films ==
†	This implies the highest-grossing movie of the year. (Note: Playing weeks represent one film in one theatre for one week)

#	Week ending	Film	Gross	Notes	Ref
1	January 5, 1972	Diamonds Are Forever	$1,551,359		
2	January 12, 1972	Diamonds Are Forever	$1,717,800		
3	January 19, 1972	Diamonds Are Forever	$963,450		
4	January 26, 1972	Diamonds Are Forever	$834,600		
5	February 2, 1972	Diamonds Are Forever	$660,962		
6	February 9, 1972	The French Connection	$769,200	The French Connection returned to number one in its 18th week on the chart	
7	February 16, 1972	The French Connection	$711,400		
8	February 23, 1972	Dirty Harry	$601,500	Dirty Harry reached number one in its ninth week on the chart	
9	March 1, 1972	The Last Picture Show	$465,350	The Last Picture Show reached number one in its 21st week on the chart	
10	March 8, 1972	The Hospital	$623,380	The Hospital reached number one in its twelfth week on the chart	
11	March 15, 1972	Dirty Harry	$726,500	Dirty Harry returned to number one in its twelfth week on the chart	
12	March 22, 1972	The Godfather †	$568,800		
13	March 29, 1972	The Godfather †	$2,698,500		
14	April 5, 1972	The Godfather †	$2,495,100		
15	April 12, 1972	The Godfather †	$2,348,100		
16	April 19, 1972	The Godfather †	$1,978,300		
17	April 26, 1972	The Godfather †	$1,775,800		
18	May 3, 1972	The Godfather †	$1,574,200		
19	May 10, 1972	The Godfather †	$1,313,600		
20	May 17, 1972	The Godfather †	$1,164,700		
21	May 24, 1972	The Godfather †	$3,188,000	First film to gross over $3 million in a week in the cities sampled	
22	May 31, 1972	The Godfather †	$2,976,600		
23	June 7, 1972	The Godfather †	$2,691,200		
24	June 14, 1972	The Godfather †	$1,814,100		
25	June 21, 1972	The Godfather †	$1,633,600		
26	June 28, 1972	The Godfather †	$1,687,800		
27	July 5, 1972	The Godfather †	$1,398,541		
28	July 12, 1972	The Godfather †	$1,112,900		
29	July 19, 1972	The Godfather †	$1,811,400		
30	July 26, 1972	The Godfather †	$1,316,800		
31	August 2, 1972	The Godfather †	$1,275,435		
32	August 9, 1972	The Godfather †	$895,500		
33	August 16, 1972	The Godfather †	$719,200		
34	August 23, 1972	The Godfather †	$610,810		
35	August 30, 1972	Butterflies Are Free	$678,900	Butterflies Are Free reached number one in its eighth week on the chart	
36	September 6, 1972	The Godfather †	$1,029,900	The Godfather returned to number one in its 25th week of release	
37	September 13, 1972	The Godfather †	$668,000		
38	September 20, 1972	The Godfather †	$456,150		
39	September 27, 1972	Super Fly	$625,500	Super Fly reached number one in its eighth week on the chart	
40	October 4, 1972	Super Fly	$457,050		
41	October 11, 1972	The New Centurions	$652,550	The New Centurions reached number one in its tenth week on the chart	
42	October 18, 1972	The New Centurions	$429,950		
43	October 25, 1972	Slaughter	$525,000	Slaughter reached number one in its tenth week on the chart	
44	November 1, 1972	Deliverance	$324,720	Deliverance reached number one in its thirteenth week on the chart	
45	November 8, 1972	The Valachi Papers	$749,000	The Valachi Papers reached number one in its third week on the chart	
46	November 15, 1972	The Valachi Papers	$740,300		
47	November 22, 1972	Lady Sings the Blues	$868,300	Lady Sings the Blues reached number one in its fifth week on the chart	
48	November 29, 1972	Lady Sings the Blues	$924,250		
49	December 6, 1972	Lady Sings the Blues	$581,600		
50	December 13, 1972	Lady Sings the Blues	$468,245		
51	December 20, 1972	Man of La Mancha	$365,996		
52	December 27, 1972	The Poseidon Adventure	$777,700	The Poseidon Adventure reached number one in its second week of release	

== Highest-grossing films ==
Highest-grossing films of 1972 by calendar year gross based on the cities covered by Variety for the weekly charts. (Note: Variety noted that the total grosses that they collated represented about one-third of total U.S. grosses as defined by the US Department of Commerce. The grosses of the top 25 films represented 48% of the total grosses collated. Variety noted that the grosses they reported were based on mostly first-run theatres in major metropolitan markets and that the performance of films from distributors such as Walt Disney Studios and Universal Pictures, which sought out smaller markets and subsequent run marketing strategies for their films, were not fully reflected in their charts.)

Rank	Title	Studio	Playing weeks (Note: Playing weeks represent one film in one theatre for one week)	Gross ($)
1.	The Godfather	Paramount	2,176	43,170,087
2.	Fiddler on the Roof	United Artists	920	13,714,068
3.	Cabaret	Allied Artists	1,254	10,869,847
4.	The French Connection	20th Century Fox	1,279	10,868,314
5.	What's Up, Doc?	Warner Bros.	733	8,714,177
6.	A Clockwork Orange	Warner Bros.	611	8,039,240
7.	Diamonds Are Forever	United Artists	683	7,526,861
8.	The Hospital	United Artists	953	6,878,594
9.	The Last Picture Show	Columbia	911	6,824,005
10.	Dirty Harry	Warner Bros.	750	6,392,199
11.	Super Fly	Warner Bros.	399	6,279,996
12.	Butterflies Are Free	Columbia	639	5,092,177
13.	Lady Sings the Blues	Paramount	435	4,874,806
14.	Frenzy	Universal	601	4,819,132
15.	Everything You Always Wanted to Know About Sex* (*But Were Afraid to Ask)	United Artists	533	4,718,382
16.	Play It Again, Sam	Paramount	442	4,700,092
17.	The New Centurions	Columbia	628	4,629,644
18.	Nicholas and Alexandra	Columbia	463	4,311,812
19.	Deliverance	Warner Bros.	265	4,048,073
20.	The Valachi Papers	Columbia	272	3,713,719
21.	Fritz the Cat	Cinemation	388	3,683,108
22.	Midnight Cowboy	United Artists	10	3,335,739
23.	Shaft's Big Score	Metro-Goldwyn-Mayer	225	3,151,923
24.	Buck and the Preacher	Columbia	276	3,089,286
25.	Conquest of the Planet of the Apes	20th Century Fox	375	2,638,754

== See also ==
- List of American films — American films by year
- Lists of box office number-one films

== Chronology ==
Preceded by 1971	1972	Succeeded by 1973
