= Han Bong-soo =

South Korean martial artist (1933–2007)

- Born: 25 August 1933; Jinsen, Chōsen (now Incheon, South Korea)
- Died: 8 January 2007 (aged 73); Santa Monica, California, U.S.
- Style: Hapkido
- Teacher: Choi Yong-sul
- Rank: 9th dan hapkido

Other information
- Website: Official website

- Han Bong-soo
- Hangul: 한봉수
- RR: Han Bongsu
- MR: Han Pongsu

Han Bong-soo (Korean: 한봉수; August 25, 1933 – January 8, 2007) was a South Korean martial artist. He is often referred to as the "Father of Hapkido" in America, and founded the International Hapkido Federation. He was one of the foremost and internationally recognized practitioners of the art through his participation in books, magazine articles, and popular films featuring the martial art.

== Early life ==
Han was born on August 25, 1933, in Jinsen (now known as Incheon), Korea. He began his study of hapkido as a teenager with Yongsul Choi in Seoul, Korea but the bulk of his training came from numerous other hapkido instructors where he received most of his black belt rankings. Han studied and refined this Korean martial art for more than 50 years. He held the rank of 9th dan black belt in hapkido. He was the founder of the International Hapkido Federation, and was its president until his death.

During the brutal occupation of Korea by Japan between 1910 and 1945, all Korean school-children were forced to read, write, and speak Japanese. In addition they were taught judo and kendo for discipline and physical education. Han studied these arts from 1943 to 1945.

From 1948 to 1950, Han studied kwon bup, which was a mixture of Chinese chuan fa methods and Shudokan karate, and earned a black belt in the art under Byung-in Yoon. Yoon's teachings later led to the development of one of the Korean schools of kong soo do and greatly influenced two of the early schools who helped to form modern taekwondo, the chang moo kwan and the jido kwan. At the outbreak of the Korean War, all martial arts schools in Korea were closed.

Han began his training in Hapkido after going to see a demonstration put on by the founder, Yong-sul Choi. From then on, he committed himself to hapkido training under Choi.

In the late 1950s, Han would meet with other instructors to train and exchange ideas. From time to time, between 1956 and 1959, he traveled to Hwa Chun, Kang Won Province, where he spent time training in the art of tae kyon, under Bok-yong Lee.

== Discovering hapkido ==
Han and his friend, Seo-oh Choi, were both employed by the Hankuk Shil Up Company which assisted other companies in bidding on army surplus goods. Both had prior training in striking-based martial arts, Choi in the Jidokwan taekwondo and Han in kwon bup and tae kyon. They became bodyguards to Korean Labour Party presidential candidate Jun Jin-han. When Jun withdrew his candidacy they both decided to continue their training in hapkido.

Han being a senior student of Yong-sul Choi, assisted in promoting the first hapkido school in the country's capital city. In 1959, Han opened his own hapkido school in the Samgangji section of Seoul. Han became an influential teacher and taught people in both the Korean military and the Korean presidential guard. Eventually, he secured a position teaching martial arts to U.S. security personnel at the Osan American air force base where he taught for 6 years.

In 1967, during the Vietnam War, Han taught self-defense to hundreds of American and Korean military personnel as part of a demonstration team for the Korea Hapkido Association.

== United States ==
In 1967, Han emigrated to the United States of America, first staying with and teaching at his friend Seo-oh Choi's hapkido school in California. Han later opened his own school in Los Angeles in 1968. His early years were difficult and he worked in a factory during the day while he taught at a struggling hapkido school in the evening, located in an economically depressed area. Later, he relocated his school to the Pacific Palisades area in an effort to be closer to Hollywood and the movie industry.

On July 4, 1969, Han Bong-soo was giving a demonstration of hapkido at a park in Pacific Palisades, California. In the audience was Tom Laughlin. After a spectacular demonstration, Laughlin approached Han about being involved in a movie project called Billy Jack. Han gained critical acclaim for staging and performing some of the most realistic martial arts fight sequences in a film. Before Billy Jack, movies contained at most brief references to martial arts, with fights portrayed by actors who had little training. With Billy Jack, Han introduced authentic hapkido techniques to Western audiences. In its sequel, The Trial of Billy Jack, he received a co-starring part where he spoke about and demonstrated the art, mentioning the art by name for the first time.

In 1974, he had a starring role with Master Edmund K. Parker, the father of American Kenpo Karate, in the action film Kill The Golden Goose. Han continued to choreograph fight sequences and bring martial arts to the big screen. In 1977, he played the evil Dr. Klahn in the spoof film, The Kentucky Fried Movie; in 1980, he appeared as the Karate Master to a group of boys in the action-comedy film, The Little Dragons, and he was the Reverend Rhee in the 1981 movie, Force: Five. In a serious demonstration of pressure-point techniques, Han also arranged the fight scene in the 1988 movie The Presidio, in which Sean Connery uses one thumb to defeat a burly assailant.

Han has been the subject of many magazine and newspaper articles, martial arts magazine cover stories, and was a member of the Black Belt Magazine Hall of Fame in 1978 and the Martial Arts History Museum Hall of Fame in 1999. He was also featured in the A&E documentary, The Martial Arts and the Wesley Snipes-produced Master of the Martial Arts.

In addition to being cited in dozens of martial arts books, he wrote many articles on the way of martial arts, and also authored the book Hapkido, The Korean Art of Self-Defense, which was published by Ohara Publications in 1974 and is now in its 23rd printing. He completed a series of ten instructional Hapkido DVDs which are in worldwide distribution.

In 1974, Han founded the International Hapkido Federation (IHF). On July 6, 2006, Black Belt Magazine presented the IHF with its 2006 Industry Award for Best Traditional School for its commitment to preserving the legacy of Hapkido.

Han died at his home in Santa Monica, California, on January 8, 2007. He was buried in the Westwood Village Memorial Park Cemetery.
