= The Out-of-Towners (1970 film) =

1970 film by Arthur Hiller

- Theatrical release poster
- Directed by: Arthur Hiller
- Written by: Neil Simon
- Produced by: Paul Nathan
- Starring: Jack Lemmon; Sandy Dennis
- Cinematography: Andrew Laszlo
- Edited by: Fred Chulack
- Music by: Quincy Jones
- Production company: Jalem Productions
- Distributed by: Paramount Pictures
- Release date: May 28, 1970
- Running time: 98 minutes
- Country: United States
- Language: English
- Box office: $7.2 million (U.S./Canada rentals)

The Out-of-Towners is a 1970 American comedy film written by Neil Simon, directed by Arthur Hiller, and starring Jack Lemmon and Sandy Dennis. It was produced through Lemmon's Jalem Productions and released by Paramount Pictures on May 28, 1970. The film centers on the many troubles George and Gwen Kellerman encounter as they travel from their home in suburban Ohio to New York City, where George, a sales executive, has a job interview.

== Plot ==
The plot revolves around Gwen and George Kellerman, whose company has invited him to interview for a possible job promotion in New York City. From the moment they depart their home town of Twin Oaks, Ohio, the couple suffers nearly every indignity out-of-towners possibly could experience: Heavy air traffic and dense fog forces their flight to circle around JFK Airport and the New York skyline for hours before finally being rerouted to Boston's Logan Airport, where they discover their luggage – in which George's ulcer medication and Gwen's extra cash are packed – was left behind.

Just missing the train at South Station in Boston, they chase it to the next stop by cab, board it (it is extremely overcrowded), and wait two hours for seats in the dining car, only to discover the only food left is peanut butter sandwiches, green olives, and crackers, with nothing to drink but tonic water and clam juice ("but they ain't cold"). Upon arrival at Grand Central Terminal in New York by 2:00 a.m., they discover that the city's subway and bus drivers, taxicab drivers, and sanitation workers are all on strike. Making their way the eight long city blocks to the Waldorf-Astoria on foot past tons of garbage in a torrential downpour, they discover upon arrival at the hotel their reservation, guaranteed for a 10:00 p.m. arrival—it is now nearly 3:00 a.m.—has been given away, and the hotel, like every other one in the city, is booked to capacity due to the strikes.

What follows is a series of calamities that includes being robbed at gunpoint by a spurious good Samaritan, a man named Murray; the apparent apathy of the police when the Kellermans report the robbery; kidnapping by armed liquor store robbers after a high-speed chase while the Kellermans are riding in a police car en route to an armory; being mugged while sleeping in Central Park; George cracking a tooth on stale Cracker Jacks left by a rambunctious Great Dane under Trefoil Arch; Gwen's broken heels; accusations of child molestation; Gwen losing her ring; being kicked off a bus because they can't pay the fare; an exploding manhole cover; expulsion from a church; and an attack by protestors in front of the Cuban embassy. With each successive catastrophe, George angrily writes down each perpetrator's name and promises to sue them or their company when he returns home.

The only thing that goes right for George is that he somehow manages to arrive on time for his 9:00 a.m. interview, unshaven, wearing rumpled clothing, a broken tooth, and virtually no food or sleep in nearly 24 hours. However, after George returns to the hotel with a very lucrative promotion, Gwen helps George realize an upwardly mobile move to New York City is not what they truly cherish after the urban problems and indignities they have suffered through, and both make the decision to remain in their small town in Ohio, only to be subjected to one more major catastrophe on the return trip—their flight home is hijacked to Cuba. Gwen says "Oh, my God!" (which she had said various other times during the movie) ending the film.

== Cast ==
- Jack Lemmon as George Kellerman
- Sandy Dennis as Gwen Kellerman
- Sandy Baron as Lenny Moyers (TV Man)
- Anne Meara as Woman in Police Station
- Robert Nichols as Man in Airplane
- Ann Prentiss as 1st Stewardess
- Ron Carey as Barney Polaczek (Cab Driver in Boston)
- A.P. Westcott as Porter on Train (uncredited)
- Philip Bruns as Officer Meyers
- Graham Jarvis as Murray (Mugger)
- Carlos Montalbán as Cuban Diplomat
- Pepe Hern as Hijacker
- Robert King as Agent in Boston
- Johnny Brown as Waiter on Train
- Dolph Sweet as Police Sergeant
- Jack Crowder as Police Officer
- Jon Korkes as Looter
- Robert Walden as Looter
- Richard Libertini as Baggage Man in Boston
- Paul Dooley as Waldorf-Astoria Hotel day Clerk
- Anthony Holland as Mr. Winkler (Waldorf Astoria night clerk)
- Billy Dee Williams as Clifford Robinson (Lost and Found Agent in Boston)
- Bob Bennett as Man in Phone Booth in Boston

== Production ==
The film was primarily shot in New York and Boston, from April to August 1969.

== Release ==
The film had its premiere May 28, 1970 at Radio City Music Hall in New York before a general release on June 24 in 326 theaters in all major US cities.

== Reception ==
=== Critical reception ===
As of June 2020, the film holds a rating of 63% on Rotten Tomatoes based on 16 reviews, with an average score of 5.88/10.

Roger Greenspun of The New York Times wrote that the film "fails so insistently that it seems a conscious exercise in dulled insights and mixed opportunities. Except for a few minor artifices ... it never improves upon the most predictable disasters or relents from that mechanical reiteration of characteristics (no character) upon which Neil Simon seems to have built his career." Arthur D. Murphy of Variety called the film "a total delight." Gene Siskel of the Chicago Tribune gave the film two stars out of four and wrote that Simon "has given his screenplay more play than screen. There's much too much dialog, and each gag has the same syntax." Charles Champlin of the Los Angeles Times stated, "There are a number of laughs in 'The Out-of-Towners' but only the shut-ins on Baffin Bay will genuinely be able to regard it as escapist fare. It is too close to truth for comfort, or unmitigated hilarity." Gary Arnold of The Washington Post described the film as "no mean let-down," explaining that "Simon has missed the point by making his leading characters unattractive. Lemmon and Miss Dennis need to be an easygoing, tolerant and sensible couple. Instead, they're a nagging and childish couple, and although audiences may be laughing at their stupidity and the disasters that befall them, I doubt if anyone is laughing out of a basic, shared sense of recognition or human sympathy." Stanley Kauffmann of The New Republic wrote- "The Out-of-Towners was written by Neil Simon and, except that it doesn't have many funny lines, it is typical of him: an interesting idea but insufficient stamina or honesty to see it through".

=== Box office ===
The film grossed $250,000 in its opening week at Radio City Music Hall, finishing joint ninth at the US box office with Beneath the Planet of the Apes which opened the same week. It reached number one in its eleventh week of release with a gross of $550,237.

=== Awards ===
Both Lemmon and Dennis were nominated for Golden Globe awards in the comedy acting categories. Simon's screenplay won him the Writers Guild of America award for Best Comedy Written Directly for the Screen.

== Remake ==
The movie was later remade in 1999 with Steve Martin, Goldie Hawn and John Cleese.

== See also ==
- List of American films of 1970
