= List of 1970 box office number-one films in the United States =

This is a list of films which have placed number one at the weekly box office in the United States during 1970.

== Number-one films ==
†	This implies the highest-grossing movie of the year.

#	Week ending	Film	Gross	Notes	Ref
1	January 7, 1970	On Her Majesty's Secret Service	$1,209,000		
2	January 14, 1970	On Her Majesty's Secret Service	$614,700		
3	January 21, 1970	Butch Cassidy and the Sundance Kid	$500,489	Butch Cassidy and the Sundance Kid returned to number one after 17 weeks of release	
4	January 28, 1970	Butch Cassidy and the Sundance Kid	$384,598		
5	February 4, 1970	The Secret of Santa Vittoria	$401,500	The Secret of Santa Vittoria reached number one in its 16th week of release	
6	February 11, 1970	Funny Girl	$795,000	Funny Girl returned to number one after 73 weeks of release	
7	February 18, 1970	Funny Girl	$596,000		
8	February 25, 1970	Funny Girl	$729,500		
9	March 4, 1970	Funny Girl	$480,750		
10	March 11, 1970	Cactus Flower	$936,200	Cactus Flower reached number one in its 12th week of release	
11	March 18, 1970	Cactus Flower	$660,500		
12	March 25, 1970	Airport †	$741,500	Airport reached number one in its third week of release	
13	April 1, 1970	Airport †	$747,400		
14	April 8, 1970	Marooned	$758,000	Marooned reached number one in its 17th week of release	
15	April 15, 1970	Butch Cassidy and the Sundance Kid/The Prime of Miss Jean Brodie (double bill)	$650,000		
16	April 22, 1970	Butch Cassidy and the Sundance Kid/The Prime of Miss Jean Brodie (double bill)	$553,000		
17	April 29, 1970	Airport †	$502,500	Airport returned to number one after 8 weeks of release	
18	May 6, 1970	Airport †	$426,500		
19	May 13, 1970	The Liberation of L.B. Jones	$532,400	The Liberation of L.B. Jones reached number one in its eighth week of release	
20	May 20, 1970	Airport †	$409,250	Airport returned to number one after 11 weeks of release	
21	May 27, 1970	Airport †	$400,000		
22	June 3, 1970	Bob & Carol & Ted & Alice	$1,064,100	Bob & Carol & Ted & Alice reached number one in its 34th week of release	
23	June 10, 1970	Bob & Carol & Ted & Alice	$914,100		
24	June 17, 1970	A Man Called Horse	$549,500	A Man Called Horse reached number one in its eighth week of release	
25	June 24, 1970	Jenny	$380,000	Jenny reached number one in its 26th week of release	
26	July 1, 1970	Airport †	$1,015,000	Airport returned to number one after 17 weeks of release	
27	July 8, 1970	Beneath the Planet of the Apes	$863,500	Beneath the Planet of the Apes reached number one in its sixth week of release	
28	July 15, 1970	Airport †	$631,600	Airport returned to number one after 19 weeks of release	
29	July 22, 1970	Beyond the Valley of the Dolls	$707,000	Beyond the Valley of the Dolls reached number one in its fifth week of release	
30	July 29, 1970	Patton	$500,600	Patton reached number one in its 25th week of release	
31	August 5, 1970	Z	$540,000	Z reached number one its 34th week of release	
32	August 12, 1970	The Out-of-Towners	$550,237	The Out-of-Towners reached number one in its 11th week on release	
33	August 19, 1970	Getting Straight	$589,400	Getting Straight reached number one in its 14th week of release	
34	August 26, 1970	Woodstock	$746,500	Woodstock reached number one in its 22nd week of release	
35	September 2, 1970	Getting Straight	$568,500	Getting Straight returned to number one in its 16th week of release	
36	September 9, 1970	On a Clear Day You Can See Forever	$741,500	On a Clear Day You Can See Forever reached number one in its twelfth week of release	
37	September 16, 1970	On a Clear Day You Can See Forever	$415,100		
38	September 23, 1970	MASH	$463,100	MASH reached number one in its 34th week of release	
39	September 30, 1970	MASH	$371,700		
40	October 7, 1970	Hello, Dolly!	$345,000	Hello, Dolly! reached number one in its 42nd week of release	
41	October 14, 1970	The Bird with the Crystal Plumage	$727,200	The Bird with the Crystal Plumage reached number one in its twelfth week of release	
42	October 21, 1970	C.C. and Company	$532,000		
43	October 28, 1970	The Professionals/In Cold Blood (reissues double bill)	$334,490		
44	November 4, 1970	Trog/Taste the Blood of Dracula (double bill)	$300,000		
45	November 11, 1970	Sunflower	$308,000	Sunflower reached number one in its seventh week of release	
46	November 18, 1970	Five Easy Pieces	$382,314	Five Easy Pieces reached number one in its ninth week of release	
47	November 25, 1970	Lovers and Other Strangers	$521,200	Lovers and Other Strangers reached number one in its 15th week of release	
48	December 2, 1970	Scrooge	$604,100	Scrooge reached number one in its fourth week of release	
49	December 9, 1970	Lovers and Other Strangers	$515,900	Lovers and Other Strangers returned to number one in its 17th week of release	
50	December 16, 1970	Scrooge	$475,800	Scrooge returned to number one in its sixth week of release	
51	December 23, 1970	Scrooge	$555,500		
52	December 30, 1970	Love Story	$983,770	Love Story reached number one in its second week of release. For the weekend ending December 27, 1970, Love Story grossed $2,363,767 from all markets in the United States and Canada.	

== Highest-grossing films ==
Highest-grossing films of 1970 by calendar year gross based on the cities covered by Variety for the weekly charts. (Note: Variety noted that the total grosses that they collated represented about 33% of total US grosses as defined by the US Department of Commerce. The grosses of the top 25 films represented 41% of the total grosses collated.)

Rank	Title	Studio	Playing weeks (Note: Playing weeks represent one film in one theatre for one week)	Gross ($)	Rank on 1970 rental chart
1.	Airport	Universal	629	12,378,259	1
2.	MASH	20th Century Fox	932	12,186,906	2
3.	Patton	20th Century Fox	832	9,327,636	3
4.	Hello, Dolly!	20th Century Fox	739	9,078,338	6
5.	Z	C5	928	7,919,478	14
6.	Bob & Carol & Ted & Alice	Columbia	748	7,160,506	4
7.	Woodstock	Warner Bros.	536	7,108,600	5
8.	Catch-22	Paramount	391	5,982,490	8
9.	Cactus Flower	Columbia	486	5,167,043	7
10.	Lovers and Other Strangers	CRC	478	4,496,608	34
11.	Cotton Comes to Harlem	United Artists	303	4,458,401	22
12.	Butch Cassidy and the Sundance Kid (Note: Butch Cassidy and the Sundance Kid was listed twice on the chart. Once on its own when it played its major dates and also in 40th place in a double bill with The Prime of Miss Jean Brodie. If the grosses for the double bill were attributed to Butch Cassidy and the Sundance Kid it would rank at least three places higher however, as Variety did not know how Fox split the grosses for the double bill, they listed the releases separately.)	20th Century Fox	717	4,413,816	N/A (Note: Listed on 1969 rental chart. Rental for Butch Cassidy and the Sundance Kid increased by $11.2 million on 1970 All-Time Box Office Champs list)
13.	The Out-of-Towners	Paramount	286	4,411,683	13
14.	They Shoot Horses, Don't They?	CRC	468	4,317,835	15
15.	Getting Straight	Columbia	451	4,298,712	23
16.	Midnight Cowboy	United Artists	551	4,036,491	N/A (Note: Listed on 1969 rental chart. Rental for Midnight Cowboy increased by $5.3 million on 1970 All-Time Box Office Champs list)
17.	Paint Your Wagon	Paramount	444	3,919,143	N/A (Note: Listed on 1969 rental chart. Rental for Paint Your Wagon increased by $12.3 million on 1970 All-Time Box Office Champs list)
18.	Beneath the Planet of the Apes	20th Century Fox	331	3,822,161	12
19.	Funny Girl	Columbia	343	3,800,202	N/A (Note: Listed on 1969 rental chart. Rental for Funny Girl increased by $8.1 million on 1970 All-Time Box Office Champs list)
20.	On a Clear Day You Can See Forever	Paramount	336	3,737,760	29
21.	Joe	Cannon	371	3,553,283	42
22.	Marooned	Columbia	327	3,370,833	33
23.	The Adventurers	Paramount	338	3,292,310	11
24.	Darling Lili	Paramount	184	3,226,802	37
25.	The Boys in the Band	National General Pictures	436	3,216,380	36

Highest-grossing films of 1970 by rental in the United States and Canada accruing to the distributor to the end of 1970 (not total receipts as listed above for a selection of cities and includes rentals from December 1969).

Rank	Title	Studio	Director	Producer	Rental ($)
1.	Airport	Universal	George Seaton	Ross Hunter	37,650,796
2.	MASH	20th Century Fox	Robert Altman	Ingo Preminger	22,000,000
3.	Patton	20th Century Fox	Franklin J. Schaffner	Frank McCarthy	21,000,000
4.	Bob & Carol & Ted & Alice	Columbia	Paul Mazursky	Larry Tucker	13,900,000^{*}
5.	Woodstock	Warner Bros.	Michael Wadleigh	Bob Maurice	13,500,000
6.	Hello, Dolly!	20th Century Fox	Gene Kelly	Ernest Lehman	13,000,000^{*}
7.	Cactus Flower	Columbia	Gene Saks	M. J. Frankovich	11,300,000^{*}
8.	Catch-22	Paramount	Mike Nichols	John Calley	9,250,000
9.	On Her Majesty's Secret Service	United Artists	Peter R. Hunt	Albert R. Broccoli; Harry Saltzman	9,000,000^{*}
10.	The Reivers	Cinema Center Films; National General Pictures	Mark Rydell	Irving Ravetch	8,000,000^{*}

^{*}Includes December 1969 rental

== See also ==
- List of American films — American films by year
- Lists of box office number-one films

== Chronology ==
Preceded by 1969	1970	Succeeded by 1971
