= Karado: The Kung Fu Flash =

1973 Hong Kong film by Joseph Kong Hung

Karado: The Kung Fu Flash is a 1973 martial arts action drama film starring Cheung Nick, that has also been released under various other titles, including Karado: The Hong Kong Cat, Superior Youngster and Super Kung Fu Kid.

Bolo Yeung (of Enter the Dragon fame) co-stars as the villainous Tiger, and James Nam has a supporting role as the hero's brother, Man Ho. Other industry stalwarts such as Yuen Biao and Mars, also appear in early roles, as thugs.

As with other martial arts films of the era, criticism is aimed at the hilarious dubbing, and nonsense fights.

== Plot ==
Ah Lung is a young man with amazing martial arts skills, who is often dealing with the local bullies, because he "only fights for truth and justice" - like his late father did. After his mother witnesses him in a fight with two brothers who were bothering him with their group, she decides that it's best they move away to be with Ah's brother, Man Ho. But unknown to Ah Lung, Man Ho is a servant of a triad leader called Tiger.

Upon docking in Yukmon, Scarly, one of Tiger's goons who is bald, takes notice of Ah Lung kicking one of his men off the pier when he refuses to pay up. When Ah Lung asks around for the whereabouts of his brother, the inn keeper is quick to brush him off, knowing Man Ho is bad news.

Local fishermen also grow suspicious of Ah Lung's presence when they see him talking to a friend, and so two of them (Monkey and Kong Hoi) follow him into the woods. Ah Lung beats them up for attacking and accusing him of being sent by someone. Scarly sees this from hiding nearby, then returns to his boss, and explains to him that he thinks "revolutionists" (whom Tiger has beef with) may have sent him to the land, to serve as a spy, and that the mystery guy has formidable fighting talent. The fishermen were also wary of Ah Lung, for the opposite reason, believing him to be an informant as well, but for the North Ocean army.

Tiger and Scarly confront Ah Lung on a beach, and begin to attack him. Afterwards, once Tiger concludes he is outperformed, Tiger states he wants to make friends with Ah Lung (obviously to keep a watch on him), but Tiger is ignored. Following this encounter, Tiger sends Man Ho to attack him in his sleep at night, but Man Ho and Ah Lung stop fighting upon hearing their mother speak, realising they're in fact long lost siblings. Man Ho explains that he is wealthy now, because he is working for Tiger.

Man Ho has Ah Lung and their mother meet with Tiger for to see about Ah Lung gaining employment as a trainer, but Ah Lung, aware of Tiger's deviousness, refuses to work for such a man. The fishermen are still suspicious of Ah Lung and won't give him a job when he greets them, as they saw him leaving Tiger's house earlier, believing he may be a recruit. But when Scarly, Man Ho and their goons attack them, Ah Lung sorts them out, and then the villagers realise they made a mistake, and befriend him. Ah Lung gives Monkey his fighting sticks after he is impressed by Ah Lung's use of them. Ah Lung then goes on a fishing trip with Monkey, Kong Hoi, Ah Fook and Kong's sister, Su Yuk.

Tiger then sends his female servant, the recently widowed and attractive Wildflower, to seduce Ah Lung. Although this trick also fails, because Ah Lung is too smart to fall for such a ruse. Wildflower however, warns Ah Lung that Tiger will use other tactics to get what he wants.

Knowing Ah Lung will continue to be a hindrance, Tiger has two friends visit him, Fung Hung and Lao Byu, who are also tough martial artists. Lao Byu has a revolver, and a lot of bullets. They bring a Japanese warrior along with them, claiming they won't stay for long, and then head to Japan. These thugs go bullying random people in a gambling joint and cheat using dice with lead, and later on, even kill an innocent woman in front of her husband, Ah Fook, after following him home. However, they make the mistake of targeting a local that Ah Lung befriended.

Although Ah Fook (who lost his wife) is shot to death during an encounter with Tiger's associates, Ah Lung gets away with the others after enduring a gunshot wound. And realising that Ah Lung is proven too much of a problem for the villains, they kidnap his mother while his brother is out of bounds, taken money to leave on Tiger's boat.

Ah Lung shows up to attempt to rescue his mother, fallen into a trap. But as they try to flee the scene together, his mother also suffers a gunshot wound. Right before she dies, she tells Ah Lung to tell his brother that Tiger was responsible for her death. Wildflower is also assaulted for switching sides and then stealing medicine to help treat Ah Lung's mother, and also for tampering with the bullets inside Lao Byu's gun, just after having sex with him. Although just as Wildflower is about to be shot, Ah Lung appears and fights the villains, but Scarly is accidentally shot to death by Tiger when trying to get at Ah Lung. The Japanese villain is also killed by Ah Lung, after being stabbed with a sword, and several goons are also eradicated.

Ah Lung escapes by jumping onto a rooftop, and he recalls that he was told by his pals that the revolutionists are coming, so they need not worry, as they will be dealing with Tiger in due course.

Running off to inform the others, Ah Lung finds his brother and more thugs not far from Tiger's getaway boat, but they still don't see eye to eye and have a knife fight before Ah Lung can explain what has occurred. Once the fight ends, which results in some goons being killed, Ah Lung lets Man Ho know that their mother was recently murdered by Tiger, vowing to seek revenge. Ah Lung walks away from his brother, disowning him for following Tiger, and Man Ho begins sobbing, finally realising that he was on the wrong side all along. But Tiger and his men soon show up, and when Man Ho berates his boss over his mother's murder, the villains impose their physical will on him. When Ah Lung returns several minutes later to see that his brother is being beaten up by Tiger and his followers, he leaps into action, and helps him in combating their arch rivals. Lao Byu is also strangled by Ah Lung, with a whip.

Man Ho is killed after suffering stab wounds from the thug who shot his mother. This only enrages Ah Lung even more. Ah Lung chases after Tiger and finishes off several more henchmen, before battling Tiger's last major heavy, Fung Hung.

Monkey and Kong Hoi run down the beach to assist Ah Lung in fighting Tiger, but are outmatched by him, with Monkey being severely injured and Kong Hoi beaten to death. Tiger makes it to the boat, while Ah Lung is fighting Fung Hung. Once Ah Lung finishes off Fung Hung, he sees that Monkey is laying on the sand nearby, barely alive. Monkey returns the weapons Ah Lung gave to him, and tells him not to let Tiger escape, before dying.

Ah Lung pole vaults onto Tiger's boat, and deals with all of Tiger's remaining guards with his nunchucks, before facing Tiger one-on-one.

After an exhausting and bloody battle, which sees Tiger trying to kill Ah Lung with the boat's anchor, and then ascending and descending the mast in an attempt to stall his defeat, Ah Lung finally kicks Tiger off the ship, to an uncertain fate. Although hereby finally avenging the deaths of his family members, as well as his friends.

== Reception ==
The film was released in the United States during the chopsocky movie craze of the era, that also included the works of Bruce Lee, beginning with the Lo Lieh film, Five Fingers of Death. The film was released in 69 theaters in New York at the end of July 1973 as Karado: The Hong Kong Flash by Hallmark and grossed $725,000 in its first week which placed it number one at the US box office.

== Alternate versions ==
Some cuts removed the following scenes, probably for censorship reasons, as well as the pacing...

- The opening fight is longer in Karado: The Hong Kong Cat, and the credits play a bit earlier. Superior Youngster starts with the goon played by Mars, saying to Cheung Lik's heroic lead character, "Man Lung. What you've done to my brother, I'm going to do to you today. Fight!"
- Longer versions show Ah Lung training during the opening credits.
- Superior Youngster totally omits the sex scene between a villain's henchman and Anna Ho's prostitute type character.
- A raunchy scene, with Bolo's pectoral muscles being massaged.
- After the end fight, there's a longer shot of Ah Lung looking into the distance, but the shortened version just goes to say 'Fine', as Tiger struggles to stay afloat.
