= The Born Losers =

1967 film by Tom Laughlin

Born Losers
- Film poster by Reynold Brown
- Directed by: T. C. Frank
- Screenplay by: Elizabeth James (as James Lloyd)
- Produced by: Donald Henderson
- Starring: Tom Laughlin; Elizabeth James; Jeremy Slate; William Wellman Jr. Jane Russell
- Cinematography: Gregory Sandor
- Edited by: John Winfield
- Music by: Mike Curb
- Production company: Otis Productions
- Distributed by: American International Pictures
- Release date: July 12, 1967
- Running time: 113 minutes
- Country: United States
- Language: English
- Budget: $400,000
- Box office: $36 million

The Born Losers is a 1967 American outlaw biker film. The film introduced Tom Laughlin as the half-Native American Green Beret Vietnam veteran Billy Jack. Since 1954, Laughlin had been trying to produce his Billy Jack script about discrimination toward Native Americans. In the 1960s, he decided to introduce the character of Billy Jack in a quickly written script designed to capitalize on the then-popular trend in motorcycle gang movies. The story was based on a real incident from 1964 where members of the Hells Angels were arrested for raping two teenage girls in Monterey, California. The movie was followed by Billy Jack (1971), which saw American International Pictures (AIP) pull out of production midway through before others stepped in.

== Plot ==
Billy Jack is introduced as an enigmatic, half-Native American Vietnam veteran who shuns society, taking refuge in the peaceful solitude of the California Central Coast mountains. His troubles begin when he descends from this unspoiled setting and drives into a small beach town named Big Rock. A minor traffic accident in which a motorist hits a motorcyclist results in a savage beating by members of the Born Losers Motorcycle Club, led by Danny Carmody. The horrified bystanders are too afraid to help or be involved in any way. Billy Jack jumps into the fray and rescues the man by himself. At this point the police arrive and arrest Billy for using a rifle to stop the fight.

The police throw Billy in jail and the judge fines him $1,000 for discharging a rifle in public (the assaulters get a $150 fine or thirty days in jail), which leads him to sell his jeep. He is treated with suspicion and hostility by the police. Meanwhile, the marauding bikers terrorize the town, rape four teenage girls, and threaten anyone slated to testify against them, with the kid brother of the leader being fingered as part of the rape. One of the girls later recants, saying she willingly gave herself to the biker gang after the gang goes to her house and turns the power off before breaking into the house to spook her. Despite the efforts of the police to get her not to recant, her mother (Jane Russell) defends her decision to not testify.

Vicky Barrington, a bikini-clad damsel-in-distress, is twice abducted and abused by the gang. The first time, she goes along with the idea of being a biker mama if she can get drugs from her bike to take as a way to sneak up on a biker to knock him out and flee. Her supposed plan of ditching her bike to flee on foot results in her being caught and raped to the point where she is put in hospital. The second time, the bikers steal a cop car and try to steal her from the hideout after she agrees to testify for the trial. Her attempted escape has her run into Billy, who takes a swing at the bikers and takes Vicky to his location on her bike; she is spooked enough not to testify. The gang comes back to his place when the two are out for lunch and steal his money. Little by little, the other victims are spooked out by the bikers and ineffective sheriffs. In the night, Billy drives out to see the bikers to talk to their leader about his stolen money. He gives them until tomorrow to get it back before leaving. The next day, the bikers confront the two at a gas station. Billy fights Gangrene and beats him before getting some of the money back and taking one of their bikes. Danny offers Vicky the chance to serve as the sexually compliant "biker mama" the easy way rather than being there by force, which she declines. The gang comes to the hideout to ask them to see Danny by their hideout, which reveals they have kidnapped one of the rape victims. The dad tries to intervene, but he fails. Billy is hit from behind with a tire iron and beaten after trying to distract long enough for Vicky to escape, but both fail. It is then that Vicky agrees to be a biker mama to get them to let go of Billy.

At the police station, Billy is unable to get help from the police or the local residents and must return to the gang's lair to rescue Vicky by himself, particularly when the last victim recants. Billy, armed with a bolt-action rifle, captures the gang, shoots the leader (Jeremy Slate) between the eyes in cold blood, and forces some of the others to take Vicky, who's been badly beaten, to the hospital. As the police finally arrive, Billy abruptly rides away on one of the gang's motorcycles.

The anti-authority sentiment continues up to the end when a police deputy accidentally shoots Billy in the back, mistaking him for a fleeing gang member. He is later found, nearly dead, lying by the shore of a lake. He is placed on a stretcher and is flown to the hospital in a helicopter as Vicky and the sheriff give him a salute.

== Cast ==
- Tom Laughlin as Billy Jack
- Elizabeth James as Vicky Barrington
- Jeremy Slate as Daniel 'Danny' Carmody
- William Wellman Jr. as Child
- Jack Starrett as Deputy Fred
- Paul Bruce as District Attorney George Davis
- Robert Cleaves as Mr. Crawford
- Paul Prokop as Speechless
- Robert Tessier as Cueball (credited as Robert W. Tessier)
- Jeff Cooper as Gangrene
- Stuart Lancaster as Sheriff Harvey (credited as Stewart Lancaster)
- Anne Bellamy as Mrs. Prang
- Gordon Hoban as Jerry Carmody
- Susan Foster as Linda Prang
- Janice Miller as Jodell Shorn
- Jane Russell as Mrs. Shorn

== Production ==
The movie was filmed on location in California at Seal Beach, Huntington Beach, Rancho Palos Verdes, University of California, Los Angeles, Big Sur, Morro Bay, Playa del Rey, and other coastal locales. The bikers' lair in Playa del Rey was once owned by silent film star Mae Murray.

According to Laughlin's DVD audio commentary, filming was completed in just three weeks on an operating budget of $160,000. To cut costs, a stunt scene of a biker crashing into a pond was taken from American International's 1966 comedy The Ghost in the Invisible Bikini..

Laughlin ran out of money during post production, but showed the film to American International Pictures who bought out the original investors and gave Laughlin $300,000 to finish it.

The film was commercially successful, and resulted in Laughlin being able to raise the funds to make its sequel, Billy Jack. In 1974, after the sequel proved financially successful, American International Pictures re-released Born Losers with the taglines "The film that introduced Billy Jack" and "Back By Popular Demand: "Born Losers" The Original Screen Appearance of Tom Laughlin as Billy Jack". The film was the highest grossing American International release until 1979, when The Amityville Horror was released.

== Reception ==
Critical response was generally negative. Film critic Leonard Maltin criticized Laughlin's films for "using violence as an indictment of violence'. The websites Letterboxd, The Grindhouse Database, and the book Search and Clear: Critical Responses to Selected Literature and Films of the Vietnam War list this movie as belonging to the vetsploitation subgenre.

In 1967, The Born Losers earned an estimated $2,225,000 in theatrical rentals in the United States and Canada. It was re-released by AIP in 1974, following the success of Billy Jack. AIP issued ads which proclaimed 'THE ORIGINAL BILLY JACK IS BACK!' which led to a lawsuit from Laughlin; following this, the advertising for the re-release of The Born Losers was changed. All newspaper advertising had to include the disclaimer 'This is a Re-Release' to make viewers aware that the film was not Billy Jack.

By 1977, The Born Losers had earned $12.5 million in U.S. and Canadian rentals. It set a record in Mexico City playing at the Teatro Metropólitan for more than 26 weeks, the longest run for a 35mm film, selling over 500,000 tickets.

== Banned Hungarian version ==
The Born Losers was released in Hungary as Halálfejesek ("Death's-heads"), dubbed by cult Hungarian actors like Zoltán Latinovits, Gábor Agárdy, Gyula Szabó, and Éva Almási. The film caused a sensation in Hungary, registering a full house at the Pushkin Cinema in Budapest and at other cinemas in capital city. A month later the film was banned in Hungary. Forty years later, the film has become very popular among Hungarian Internet circles and on YouTube.

== See also ==
- List of American films of 1967
