= The Master Gunfighter =

1975 Western film by Tom Laughlin

- Theatrical release poster
- Directed by: Tom Laughlin
- Written by: Tom Laughlin
- Based on: Goyokin; 1969 film by Hideo Gosha; Kei Tasaka
- Produced by: Philip L. Parslow
- Starring: Tom Laughlin; Ron O'Neal; Barbara Carrera
- Narrated by: Burgess Meredith
- Cinematography: Jack A. Marta
- Edited by: Danford B. Greene; William Reynolds
- Music by: Lalo Schifrin
- Production company: Taylor-Laughlin Productions
- Distributed by: Warner Bros.
- Release date: October 3, 1975 (United States)
- Running time: 121 minutes
- Country: United States
- Language: English
- Budget: $3.5-3.8 million
- Box office: $1.8 million

The Master Gunfighter is a Western film released in 1975 in Panavision, written and directed by Tom Laughlin, who also played the lead as Finley. The Master Gunfighter is mainly a remake of the 1969 Japanese film Goyokin, although the story revolves around a true incident in the early 1800s involving massacred Indians that occurred in the vicinity of Goleta, California.

== Plot ==
In southern California near Santa Barbara shortly after California became part of the United States, American settlers and the U.S. government discriminate against the Mexican landowners and frequently take their land by force or legal skullduggery. Wealthy Latino ranchers whose land and wealth are at risk decide to misdirect a U.S. government ship carrying gold so that it will be wrecked and plundered. To prevent themselves from being caught, they plan to massacre the local Chumash Indians. The hero is the now-estranged adoptive son Finley (Tom Laughlin), a master swordsman and gunfighter, who tries to prevent this while still saving his family.

== Cast ==
- Tom Laughlin as Finley
- Ron O'Neal as Paulo
- Lincoln Kilpatrick as Jacques
- Geo Anne Sosa as Chorika
- Barbara Carrera as Eula
- Victor Campos as Maltese
- Hector Elias as Juan
- Burgess Meredith as Narrator

The director was Tom Laughlin, but officially the director credited was his son Frank (in 1975 he was 9).

== Release ==
Due to the success of Billy Jack and The Trial of Billy Jack, Laughlin anticipated The Master Gunfighter would also be a hit and the film was accompanied with a $3.5 million marketing budget coupled with a nationwide distribution to 1,000 theaters by Laughlin's distribution company, Taylor-Laughlin Distribution Co. The film only stayed in theaters for 12 days and General Cinema Corporation withdrew exhibition for the film after Taylor-Laughlin demanded a $10,000 rental advance along with $500 per theater advertising commitment. One of Laughlin's marketing stunts involved the rental of an electric sign in Times Square attacking film critics as failed writers who couldn't make it in the movie business.

== Critical reception ==
Film critic Roger Ebert was harsh in his criticism of the film, writing, "The movie opens with a long-winded narration, in a hapless attempt to orient us, but not long afterward the narrator has to break in again—we're lost already. It's all to little avail. I don't think there's any way an intelligent moviegoer could sit through this mess and accurately describe the plot afterward." Richard Eder of The New York Times wrote, "It is long, stilted, self-conscious, badly acted and boring. Apart from that, there is little to recommend it." Joseph McBride of Variety called it "[a] curious blend of amateurish plotting and slick production values," adding that "John Wayne never killed so many bad guys as Laughlin does in this film, and Errol Flynn at his most spectacular lacked the uncanny fighting skills Laughlin displays here. It's a throwback to an earlier age of swashbuckling, but the blend with contemporary bleeding heart attitudes makes the film seem hypocritical." Gene Siskel of the Chicago Tribune gave the film 1 star out of 4 and wrote, "'The Master Gunfighter' reminds me of a made-for-television movie: The story is forever being interrupted by messages from the sponsor. In this case the sponsor is Billy Jack ... every so often the action grinds to a halt when Billy-as-Gunfighter delivers a sanctimonious lecture on fidelity, honor, or racial injustice. The speeches are outrageous, funny, embarrassing, and insulting by turns." Kevin Thomas of the Los Angeles Times wrote, "Stunningly photographed by veteran Jack A. Marta, 'The Master Gunfighter,' a splendid period re-creation, is awash with striking imagery that finds beauty even in chaos—just as in a samurai movie. Sometimes young Laughlin's pacing verges on the static, but the action sequences are excitingly staged." Gary Arnold of The Washington Post wrote, "You know you're in for a long, slow evening when the picture begins with a preamble of several hundred words, recited by Burgess Meredith over shots of the sun coming up. The opening sequences set a pattern of confused, incoherent action and stilted acting that is adhered to with a kind of kamikaze devotion for the duration of the movie. By the time Laughlin rides into the sunset most of the audience will be in a coma or already back home, trying to laugh off a bad investment."

Time Out magazine was also critical, writing, "The film could have worked but for an excess of formula ingredients and muddled preachings. Adapted from a Japanese film, the transposition dubiously retains much samurai sword fighting and semi-Oriental costumes. Meanwhile, the over-mannered camerawork pays its dues to the Italian Western. In the resulting cultural hash, the plot with its strong anti-religious theme is too often disregarded."

== Filming locations ==
- Monterey, California
- La Purísima Mission State Historic Park, Lompoc, California

== Awards ==
=== Nominations ===
- Golden Globes: Best Acting Debut in a Motion Picture—Female, Barbara Carrera, 1976.

== See also ==
- List of American films of 1975
