= Tom Laughlin =

American actor and filmmaker (1931–2013)

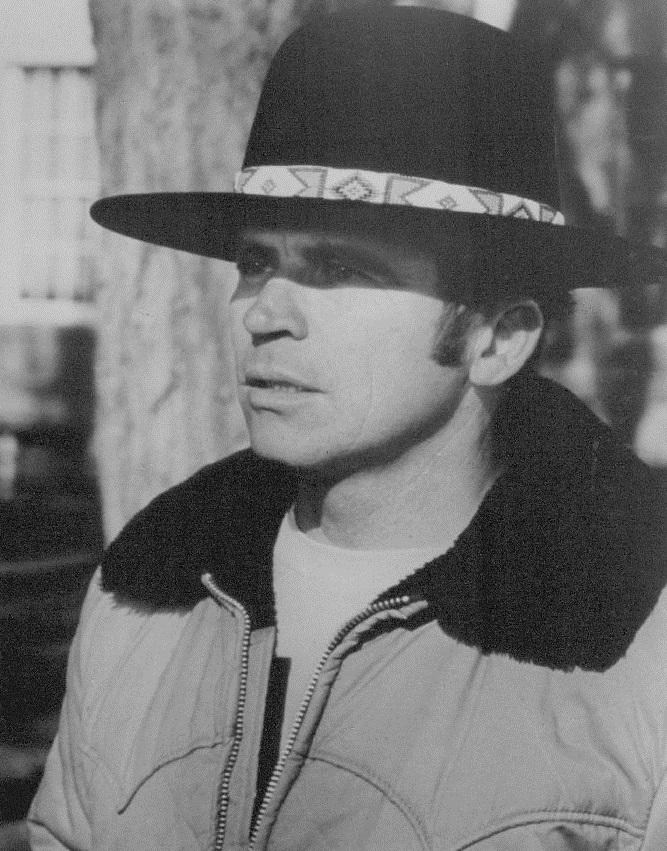
- Laughlin in 1978
- Born: Thomas Robert Laughlin Jr. August 10, 1931; Milwaukee, Wisconsin, U.S.
- Died: December 12, 2013 (aged 82); Thousand Oaks, California, U.S.
- Other names: Tommy Laughlin, T.C. Frank, Don Henderson, Mary Rose Solti, Frank Laughlin, Frank Christina, Lloyd E. James
- Occupations: Actor, film director, film producer, screenwriter, educator
- Years active: 1955–2010
- Spouse: Delores Taylor (m. 1954)
- Children: 3

Thomas Robert Laughlin Jr. (August 10, 1931 – December 12, 2013) was an American actor, filmmaker, educator, activist, and perennial candidate. He was best known as the star and director of the Billy Jack tetralogy of action drama films, produced between 1969 and 1977. His unique promotion of the 1974's The Trial of Billy Jack (TV trailers during national news and an "opening day" nationwide release) was a major influence on the way films are marketed.

In the early 1960s, Laughlin put his film career on hiatus to start a Montessori preschool in Santa Monica, California; it became the largest school of its kind in the United States. In his later years, he sought the office of President of the United States in 1992, 2004, and 2008. He was involved in psychology and domestic violence counseling, writing several books on Jungian psychology and developing theories on the causes of cancer. He was married to actress Delores Taylor from 1954 until his death.

== Early life and career (1931–1960) ==
Laughlin was born in Milwaukee, Wisconsin, the son of Margaret and Thomas Laughlin. He attended Washington High School, where he was involved in an athletics controversy that made headlines throughout the city, caused by Laughlin being forced to attend another school for a brief period, making him ineligible to play football at his former school on his return.

Laughlin attended the University of Wisconsin, before transferring to Marquette University; he played football at both. He played safety and halfback at Marquette.

Laughlin decided to become an actor after seeing a production of A Streetcar Named Desire. According to a 1956 newspaper interview, he became involved in the drama program at Marquette after being encouraged by a university professor, Father John J. Walsh.

While a student, he formed a stock group and directed and starred in a production of Arthur Miller's All My Sons. He finally transferred to the University of South Dakota, where he majored in radio acting, directing, and producing. He met his future wife Delores Taylor in South Dakota.

Laughlin wrote the original screenplay for the film Billy Jack in 1954, after witnessing the treatment of Native Americans in his wife's hometown, Winner, South Dakota. The two wed on October 15, 1954.

He began his screen-acting career in the 1955 television series Climax!. From there, he went on to appear in several feature films, including: These Wilder Years, (1956), Tea and Sympathy (1956), Lafayette Escadrille (1958), and South Pacific (1958).

He appeared in several episodes of various television series throughout the late 1950s. In 1958, Laughlin appeared in a small but memorable role in South Pacific, the movie version of the James Michener book and Rodgers and Hammerstein musical as a Navy pilot, Lt. Buzz Adams.

In 1959, he was cast as young Tom Fowler in the episode "The Fight Back" of the NBC Western series, Riverboat. In the story line, Fowler has made himself the boss of Hampton, a corrupt river town near Vicksburg, Mississippi. He blocks farmers from shipping their crops to market. In a dispute over a wedding held on the river vessel, the Enterprise, a lynch mob led by Fowler comes after Captain Grey Holden (series star Darren McGavin). Also appearing in this episode are John Ireland as Chris Slade and Karl Swenson as Ansel Torgin.

That same year, Laughlin starred in the western series Tales of Wells Fargo, the episode titled "The Quiet Village". Laughlin also appeared in the 1959 movie Battle of the Coral Sea with Cliff Robertson and L. Q. Jones.

Also in 1959, Laughlin appeared in the film Gidget as Lover Boy. However, he failed to earn a living in the early years, having told People magazine in 1975, "We were living on $5 a week and eating Spam. I stole Christmas cards from a church so I could write home saying how well we were, but then I couldn't afford the stamps."

Laughlin's first starring film role was in Robert Altman's 1957 film The Delinquents, in which he played Scotty White, a teenager who gets mixed up with a gang when he is told he can no longer see his girlfriend. Despite the film's low budget, it became a cult film, with Alfred Hitchcock reportedly among its fans. However, Laughlin and Altman did not get along well, having sharply differing views on acting, Altman later describing Laughlin as "an unbelievable pain in the ass."

Laughlin made his directorial debut later that year with The Proper Time, though the film wasn't released until 1962. The film was a romantic drama set on the campus of UCLA. Laughlin shot the film on the campus in six days working with a $20,000 (Note: equivalent to $217,660 in 2025) budget.

Laughlin wrote, directed, and starred in The Young Sinner. Originally filmed in 1960, and shot in Milwaukee over a period of 14 days, it is the story of a star high-school athlete who falls deeper and deeper into trouble after being caught in bed with his girlfriend. The film was intended to be the first of a trilogy titled We Are All Christ. It premiered in 1963 under the original title Among the Thorns, which was changed to The Young Sinner upon its 1965 re-release. In 1960, Laughlin planned to make a film, Poison in Our Land, based on the true story of a Texas couple affected by atomic radiation, but the project was never realized.

== Leaving Hollywood (1961–1966) ==
In 1959, Laughlin and his wife founded a Montessori preschool in Santa Monica, California. By 1961, Laughlin had left the film business to devote all of his time to the school, which by 1964 had become the largest school of its kind in the United States. It was profiled by Time in July of that year. However, by 1965, the school had gone bankrupt. One of his students was Christian Brando, son of Laughlin's friend, Marlon Brando.

== Billy Jack years (1967–1977) ==
In 1965, Laughlin told the Milwaukee Sentinel that he planned to make a film on the life of a noted Catholic priest, Father William DuBay. However, the picture did not get past the planning stages. Two years later, in 1967, he wrote, directed (as T. C. Frank), and starred in the motorcycle-gang exploitation film The Born Losers. This was the first picture in which the character of Billy Jack appeared. It was a surprise box-office hit.

After The Born Losers, Laughlin was set to begin a film project with backing from such figures as Marlon Brando, Jack Lemmon, Candice Bergen, and director Robert Wise. The movie was to be a documentary on the issues facing African Americans in the 1960s and would have focused greatly on the life of Martin Luther King Jr., followed by a discussion of race. However, the film was never made.

He followed this up with the sequel to The Born Losers, Billy Jack, in 1971. American International Pictures initially agreed to distribute the picture, but after viewing it, the studio refused to release the film unless many of the political references – as well as frontal nudity – were cut. This led the Laughlins to withhold the sound reels of the movie, which in effect made it a silent film. Eventually, Laughlin made a distribution deal with Warner Bros., but he disapproved of the studio's marketing of the film, sued Warner, and re-released the picture himself in 1973. The movie's re-release was successful but controversial. Roger Ebert, in his review of the film, wrote, "Billy Jack seems to be saying that a gun is better than a constitution in the enforcement of justice. Is democracy totally obsolete, then? Is our only hope that the good fascists defeat the bad fascists?"

However, the picture was embraced by much of America's youth, leading Laughlin to claim in 1975, "The youth of this country have only two heroes, Ralph Nader and Billy Jack." When adjusted for inflation, Billy Jack was, as of 2007, the highest-grossing independent film of all time. The film was among the first to introduce martial arts, especially hapkido, to American audiences and contained elements of Jungian psychology, and fictional depictions of American Indian beliefs, depicting a tribe that does not exist, the "Nishnobie". As part of the film's promotion, Bong Soo Han, who was in charge of the martial arts choreography for the film, toured the United States giving hapkido demonstrations.

The Born Losers was reissued in 1974 and earned more than twice as much as it had in its original release.

The second sequel, The Trial of Billy Jack, released in late 1974, was a huge box-office hit, while not registering as quite as big a critical success. It is notable for its casting of notable Native Americans, and counterculture figures like Rolling Thunder, as well as its strong criticism of the Kent State shootings. However, Laughlin's unique promotion of the film was its real legacy. Unlike most films of the era, which opened in only a few cities before gradually spreading across the country, The Trial of Billy Jack opened in cities nationwide on the same day and commercials were broadcast for it during the national news. This promotion forever changed the way films are marketed and has been called "the first blockbuster."

Laughlin had been in dispute with AIP and reached a settlement in 1974, agreeing to pay them $2 million, (Note: equivalent to $13.1 million in 2025) including $500,000 (Note: equivalent to $3.26 million in 2025) from The Born Losers reissue and $250,000 (Note: equivalent to $1.63 million in 2025) for AIP's percentage share of The Trial of Billy Jack.

In 1975, Laughlin released The Master Gunfighter, a Western set in the 1840s, detailing the plight of the Chumash people. Laughlin grew a full beard for the film and his character fought with both a 12-shot revolver and a samurai sword. Although it did reasonably well at the box office, critics were not pleased with the film.

Laughlin returned to the Billy Jack franchise in 1977. However, the fourth entry in the series, Billy Jack Goes to Washington, was a failure because of distribution problems, and it proved to be Laughlin's final film. Laughlin blamed individuals within the United States government for the failure of the picture, telling CNN's Showbiz Tonight in 2005:

At a private screening, Senator Vance Hartke [Note: Hartke was not re-elected in 1976] got up, because it was about how the Senate was bought out by the nuclear industry. He got up and charged me. Walter Cronkite's daughter was there, [and] Lucille Ball. And he said, 'You'll never get this released. This house you have, everything will be destroyed.' "

At the time of the picture's release, Laughlin's company, Billy Jack Enterprises, had plans for a new Montessori school funded by his own foundation, a record label, an investigative magazine, books, a distribution company, and more message-laden movies, including a special subsidiary to produce films for children. He told People magazine at the time, "Three years from today, we'll be the new United Artists. Either that, or we'll be out on our butt on the street." In 1976, Laughlin announced that he was more than $7 million (Note: equivalent to $39.6 million in 2025) in debt and blamed the financial troubles on unethical behavior by Warner Bros. Pictures, which he said had illegally sold the television rights to his films.

== Later career ==
In 1984, he purchased a series of 12 advertisements in Variety condemning various aspects of the film industry and its treatment of independent filmmakers. He created a blueprint for taking control of the home video distribution industry as a way for independent films to be seen. In 1985, he began production of a fifth Billy Jack film, The Return of Billy Jack, which featured the title character fighting child pornographers in New York City. However, he suffered a concussion and neck injury during filming, which led to the production being suspended. During this hiatus, funding for the picture ran out and production was never resumed. Later on, Laughlin had his mansion in Brentwood, California foreclosed. He attempted to sue to get it back a couple of years later.

In 2009, a few scenes from the unfinished film were released on Laughlin's website. A notable incident occurred while he was filming in New York City, when he broke up a street fight on Manhattan's West Side, threatening to rip a man's arm off. He garnered notoriety at this time for making a citizen's arrest of a man after an argument over Laughlin's driving.

Laughlin had sought funding to finish the fifth Billy Jack film since at least 1996, when he spoke about it during a lawsuit against a man who had (Laughlin claimed) illegally changed his name to "Billy Jack", and at one point Laughlin had plans to make a Billy Jack television series. In 2004, he announced that the film would be entitled Billy Jack's Crusade to End the War in Iraq and Restore America to Its Moral Purpose; this was shortened to Billy Jack's Moral Revolution in 2006.

In 2008, the film's title was changed to Billy Jack for President. It was retitled Billy Jack and Jean. Laughlin claimed it would be a "new genre of film" and a great deal of social commentary on politics, religion, and psychology will be discussed, and a debate will take place between Billy Jack and President George W. Bush via computer manipulation of archived speeches.

In 2009, Laughlin released plot details of this film on a video on his website. The video contained several scenes from the film.

In 2010, Frank, Chris, and Teresa Laughlin co-founded Billy Jack Rights, LLC, which manages the rights to all of Tom Laughlin's films, including the Billy Jack franchise.

== Other work ==
=== Politics ===
In his later years, Laughlin turned his attention to politics. He had developed an idea for a film involving a general who returns from war to run for president, but when researching by talking to voters, he thought about running for the office himself. In 1992, as a protest he sought the Democratic Party nomination for U.S. President. He told the Milwaukee Sentinel, "I am the least qualified person I know to be President, except George Bush."

He appeared on the primary ballots in New Hampshire and Louisiana. He campaigned on a platform of a tax cut for "ordinary Americans", term limits, an overhaul of public education, universal health care, and nuclear disarmament. While campaigning for the Iowa caucus, he said of a fellow candidate and an Iowan, U.S. Senator Tom Harkin: "I think he's a sleazebag. I despise him."

Excluded from debates by party officials who did not consider him a serious candidate, Laughlin received 1,986 votes in the New Hampshire primary. He blamed the results on lack of cooperation by the Democratic Party, which allowed him and other candidates only five minutes to speak at the state's convention while giving the five front-runners 20 minutes each. He participated in the independent presidential candidates' debate on March 25, 1992, along with former U.S. Senator Eugene J. McCarthy and others who had been excluded from the major debates. However, he was seen by much of the press as a "fringe candidate".

Laughlin later protested at being excluded from the primary ballot in his home state of Wisconsin at the same time that David Duke, the former Grand Wizard of the Ku Klux Klan, was included. After dropping out of the race, he worked as an advisor to the campaign of Ross Perot.

He ran for president again in 2004, this time as a Republican. Campaigning as an opponent of the Iraq War, he received 154 votes in the New Hampshire primary against President George W. Bush, who received 53,962 votes. He again was not allowed to participate in the debates. He ran again for president in 2008 as a Democrat, getting 47 votes in the New Hampshire primary.

Laughlin was an outspoken critic of the Iraq War and President George W. Bush. His website presented several writings calling the Iraq conflict worse than the Vietnam War, in addition to pieces on what he called "realistic exit strategies". He devoted several pages of the Billy Jack website to reasons that he felt justified an impeachment of George W. Bush and repeatedly stated the need for a viable, mainstream third political party. In addition, he criticized what he called the "Christian right", which he called "false Evangelicals", "false prophets", and the "Christo-fascist movement". He released several videos and writings during the 2008 election.

=== Psychology and counseling ===
Although not a professionally trained psychologist, Laughlin had an interest in psychology, having studied the subject independently. A 1975 profile of Laughlin in People mentioned his deep interest in psychology and mentioned that he had a personal "dream secretary" to whom Laughlin told his recollections of his dreams. They were written down to be analyzed later.

Laughlin lectured on Jungian psychology at universities and colleges throughout the United States since the 1970s, including Yale University and Stanford University.

In 1995, because of his background in football and psychology, he was brought in to counsel Nebraska Cornhuskers football player Lawrence Phillips after Phillips' suspension from the team. He said of Phillips at the time, "He should not be rewarded by being allowed to play unless there is real substantive change. I don't mean surface change. But if he does change, then he's not only going to not batter this girl, he's not going to batter the girl he marries at 30 and 35. If he just pretends to change, of course he should not be allowed to play, but Lawrence has already been sanctioned in ways other batterers on this campus are not". Phillips ended up being reinstated late in the season and left for the pros after 1995.

Laughlin wrote several books on psychology, including The Psychology of Cancer; Jungian Psychology vol. 2: Jungian Theory and Therapy, published in 1980; 9 Indispensable Ingredients to Writing a Hit (1999), which details the psychology involved in the box office and hit filmmaking, and The Cancer Personality (1998), in which he posited his theories about cancer.

One of his concerns was the issue of domestic abuse. He became involved in this after witnessing a neighbor, a police officer, beating his wife. He blamed the murder of Nicole Brown Simpson on domestic abuse, saying

O.J. Simpson was my neighbor up the street on Rockingham. He lived at 300 Rockingham Drive, I lived at 100 Rockingham. I've known O.J. forever. This is one of the sickest, sorriest days in our culture, that he was [found] not guilty... I've told him since 1985 he'd end up in jail... Eight times [Nicole] cried out and eight times, because it was O.J. and it was woman-battering, it was dismissed. But now, with the trivialization, people are afraid to call because they don't trust that the system will help them. The fact that he was found not guilty is going to make that 10 times worse.

== Personal life ==
Laughlin married Delores Taylor in 1954. They had three children: Frank, Teresa, and Christina. His daughter Teresa is a fashion designer. He derived at least two of his pseudonyms from his children: Frank Laughlin, his son's name and the name he used to direct The Trial of Billy Jack and The Master Gunfighter, and T.C. Frank, which stood for Teresa Christina Frank.

In 2001, it was announced that Laughlin was suffering from a cancer of the tongue that was inoperable. His website claimed the cancer was in remission. His book The Psychology of Cancer was about faith, attitude, and other factors that might affect cancer.

In January 2007, a tearful Tom Laughlin gave the eulogy for the man who taught him hapkido for the movie Billy Jack, the late hapkido grandmaster Han Bong-soo, whom Laughlin remembered as "a holy man".

On November 20, 2007, he posted a video on YouTube explaining that poor health had caused him to leave his BillyJack.com website in a dormant state. The site was later revived. Laughlin suffered from celiac disease, an autoimmune disorder, and suffered a series of strokes. In the video, he announced that he had his health issues under control, that he updated the website, and that he was planning a new Billy Jack film. However, that film was never made.

== Filmography ==
As director

- The Proper Time (1960) (also served as writer)
- Like Father, Like Son (1961) (also served as writer)
- The Born Losers (1967)
- Billy Jack (1971) (also served as writer)
- The Trial of Billy Jack (1974) (also served as writer)
- The Master Gunfighter (1975) (also served as writer)
- Billy Jack Goes to Washington (1977) (also served as writer)
- The Return of Billy Jack (1986; unreleased)

== Death ==
Laughlin died of complications from pneumonia on December 12, 2013, at Los Robles Hospital and Medical Center in Thousand Oaks, California.

== See also ==
- List of people diagnosed with coeliac disease
- Political cinema
