= Billy Jack =

1971 action drama film directed by Tom Laughlin

- Theatrical release poster
- Directed by: Tom Laughlin (as T. C. Frank)
- Written by: Tom Laughlin; (as Frank Christina); Delores Taylor; (as Theresa Christina)
- Produced by: Tom Laughlin (as Mary Rose Solti)
- Starring: Tom Laughlin; Delores Taylor
- Cinematography: Fred J. Koenekamp; John M. Stephens
- Edited by: Larry Heath; Marion Rothman
- Music by: Mundell Lowe; Dennis Lambert; Brian Potter
- Production company: National Student Film Corporation
- Distributed by: Warner Bros.
- Release date: May 1, 1971
- Running time: 114 minutes
- Country: United States
- Language: English
- Budget: $800,000
- Box office: $32.5 million (rentals)

Billy Jack is a 1971 American action drama independent film, the second of four films centering on a character of the same name (played by Tom Laughlin, who directed and co-wrote the script) which began with the movie The Born Losers (1967). Filming began in Prescott, Arizona, in the fall of 1969, but the movie was not completed until 1971. American International Pictures pulled out, halting filming. 20th Century Fox came forward and filming eventually resumed but when that studio refused to distribute the film, Warner Bros. stepped forward.

Still, the film lacked distribution, so Laughlin booked it into theaters himself in 1971. The film grossed $10 million in its initial run, but eventually added close to $50 million in its re-release, with distribution supervised by Laughlin.

== Plot ==
Men from a western U.S. town herd wild mustangs into a remote pen to be illegally slaughtered as dog food. The county's corrupt political boss Stuart Posner tells his son Bernard to shoot the first mustang, but he refuses. The men are interrupted by Billy Jack, a mixed-race Navajo and Green Beret Vietnam War veteran; he threatens the men with a rifle and they release the mustangs.

Sheriff Cole brings Barbara, a teenage runaway, home to her father, Deputy Mike. She is pregnant, does not know who the father is, and admits to having sex with numerous men including several who were not white. Mike punches her in the face and she flees to the town doctor. The doctor and Sheriff Cole fear Mike will continue abusing her, so they arrange for her to live in secret at the counterculture Freedom School, which the distrustful townspeople seldom visit. Billy Jack is the school's protector. Barbara is initially uncomfortable at the school but feels more welcome after the director, Jean Roberts, encourages her to participate in improvisational theatre. Barbara befriends Martin, a Native American student.

Freedom School students visit the town. Bernard and his friend Dinosaur harass students being refused service at an ice cream shop because the group includes Native Americans. After Bernard punches and humiliates Martin, Billy Jack enters the shop and beats up Bernard and Dinosaur. Prevented from leaving by Stuart Posner and other townspeople, Billy Jack performs a hapkido kick to Stuart's face and subdues several others before being overwhelmed. Sheriff Cole disperses the crowd but refuses to arrest anyone.

Stuart Posner and the town council discuss limitations on student visits to town. The students express their opposition, and council members agree to visit the Freedom School. Barbara stays with Billy Jack at an ancient Native American ruin while Mike unsuccessfully searches for her at the school. Council members attend an improvisational comedy performance at the school, and the students hold comedic street performances in town, amusing the townspeople.

Billy Jack undergoes a Navajo initiation in which he deliberately allows a large rattlesnake to bite him. Bernard and Dinosaur contemplate shooting him.

Jean and Billy Jack stop Bernard from sexually assaulting a female Freedom School student in his Corvette. Bernard drives the car into a lake to avoid Billy Jack breaking his arm.

Bernard kidnaps and rapes Jean. Jean refuses to tell Billy Jack because she fears he will attack Bernard, undermining the townspeople's newfound goodwill towards the school. Meanwhile, Barbara miscarries when she falls from a horse. The town doctor reveals that the baby would have been white. Bernard finds out and lies to Mike, telling him that Martin was the father. Mike kidnaps Martin. Barbara, in love with Martin, offers to come home if Mike lets him go. However, Martin escapes, Bernard and Dinosaur pursue him, and Bernard shoots him dead.

Billy Jack finds out that Bernard raped Jean and killed Martin, then catches Bernard having sex with a 13-year-old girl. Bernard shoots Billy Jack, but Billy Jack kills him using hapkido.

Police bring search warrants to the school, but Barbara and Billy Jack escape and barricade themselves in an abandoned church. A shootout with police ensues and Barbara is wounded. After Jean tells Billy Jack she loves him, he surrenders in exchange for a decade-long guarantee the school will stay open with Jean, as its head, given custody of Barbara. As Billy Jack is driven away in handcuffs, a large crowd of supporters raise their fists in a show of defiance and support.

== Cast ==
- Tom Laughlin as Billy Jack
- Delores Taylor as Jean Roberts
- David Roya as Bernard Posner
- Clark Howat as Sheriff Cole
- Victor Izay as Doctor
- Julie Webb as Barbara
- Debbie Schock as Kit
- Teresa Kelly as Carol
- Lynn Baker as Sarah
- Stan Rice as Martin
- John McClure as Dinosaur
- Susan Foster as Cindy
- Susan Sosa as Sunshine
- Bert Freed as Mr. Stuart Posner
- Kenneth Tobey as Deputy Mike
- Howard Hesseman as Howard (credited as Don Sturdy)
- Alan Myerson as O.K. Corralles
- Richard Stahl as Council Chairman
- Cisse Cameron as Miss False Eyelashes (credited as Cissie Colpitts)
- Han Bong-soo Fight double for Tom Laughlin

== Box-office and critical reception ==
Billy Jack holds a "Fresh" rating of 65% at Rotten Tomatoes based on 17 reviews, with an average grade of 5.4/10. The website The Grindhouse Database, and the book Search and Clear: Critical Responses to Selected Literature and Films of the Vietnam War list this movie as belonging to the vetsploitation subgenre.

Film critic Leonard Maltin at first gave Billy Jack 3.5 stars out of 4, calling it "Uneven in spots but tremendously powerful." Later, he downgraded it to 1.5 stars, writing, "Seen today, its politics are highly questionable, and its 'message' of peace looks ridiculous, considering the amount of violence in the film." Roger Ebert gave the film 2.5 stars out of 4 and also saw the message of the film as self-contradictory, writing: "I'm also somewhat disturbed by the central theme of the movie. Billy Jack seems to be saying the same thing as Born Losers: that a gun is better than a constitution in the enforcement of justice." Howard Thompson, writing for The New York Times, agreed, calling the film "well-aimed but misguided" as he wrote, "For a picture that preaches pacifism, Billy Jack seems fascinated by its violence, of which it is full." He added that "some of the non-professional delivery of lines in the script by Mr. Frank and Teresa Christina is incredibly awful." Variety magazine opined that "the action frequently drags" and at nearly two hours' running length, "The message is rammed down the spectators" throats and is sorely in need of considerable editing to tell a straightforward story." Gene Siskel gave Billy Jack 3.5 stars out of 4, calling it "a film that tries to say too many things in too many ways within an adequate story line, but it has such freshness, original humor and compassion that one is frequently moved to genuine emotion". Kevin Thomas, in the Los Angeles Times, also liked Billy Jack, praising its "searing tension that sustains it through careening unevenness to a smash finish. Crude and sensational yet urgent and pertinent, this provocative Warners release is in its unique, awkward way one of the year's important pictures."

Gary Arnold, writing for The Washington Post, panned Billy Jack as "horrendously self-righteous and devious", explaining, "Every social issue is dramatized in terms of absolute, apolitical good and evil. The good guys... are next to angelic, while the bad guys are, according to the needs of the moment, utter buffoons or utter devils. Anyone with the slightest trace of skepticism or sophistication would tend to reject the movie out of hand and with good reason, since this kind of simplification is dramatically and socially deceitful." David Wilson, in The Monthly Film Bulletin, wrote: "If in the end Billy Jack is as much a sell-out as any glossier version of commercialized iconoclasm (Billy Jack is persuaded to accept guarantees which a hundred years of Indian history have repudiated), there is enough innocent sincerity in the film to demonstrate that Tom Laughlin at least has the courage of his convictions, even if those convictions are scarcely thought out."

Delores Taylor received a Golden Globe nomination as Most Promising Newcoming Actress. Tom Laughlin won the grand prize for Billy Jack at the 1971 Taormina Film Fest in Italy.

== Accolades ==
The film is recognized by American Film Institute in these lists:

- 2003: AFI's 100 Years...100 Heroes & Villains:
  - Billy Jack – Nominated Hero

== Sequels ==
A direct sequel followed with The Trial of Billy Jack (1974). Billy Jack Goes to Washington (1977) had only a brief, limited release. In 1985, filming began on a third sequel, The Return of Billy Jack, but the production ran out of money and was never completed.

== Soundtrack ==
Billy Jack

Soundtrack album by Mundell Lowe
- Released: 1972
- Recorded: 1971
- Genre: Film score
- Labels: Warner Bros. WS 1926
- Producer: Mundell Lowe

Mundell Lowe chronology
Satan in High Heels (1961)	Billy Jack (1972)	California Guitar (1974)

The film score was composed, arranged and conducted by Mundell Lowe and the soundtrack album was originally released on the Warner Bros. label.

=== Reception ===
The AllMusic review states "a strange and striking combination of styles that somehow is effective ... a listenable disc whose flaws only add to the warmth". A cover of Canadian band The Original Caste, the film's theme song, "One Tin Soldier" was recorded by Jinx Dawson, of the band Coven, with session musicians providing the backing and later a re-recording, renamed as "One Tin Soldier (The Legend of Billy Jack)", credited to the band Coven, became a Top 40 hit in 1971 and again in 1973.

Professional ratings
Review scores
Source	Rating
AllMusic	3.5/5 stars

=== Track listing ===
All compositions by Mundell Lowe, except as indicated.

1. "One Tin Soldier" (Dennis Lambert, Brian Potter) – 3:18
2. "Hello Billy Jack" – 0:45
3. "Old and the New" – 1:00
4. "Johnnie" (Teresa Kelly) – 2:35
5. "Look, Look to the Mountain" (Kelly) – 1:40
6. "When Will Billy Love Me" (Lynn Baker) – 3:24
7. "Freedom Over Me" (Gwen Smith) – 0:35
8. "All Forked Tongue Talk Alike" – 2:54
9. "Challenge" – 2:20
10. "Rainbow Made of Children" (Baker) – 3:50
11. "Most Beautiful Day" – 0:30
12. "An Indian Dance" – 1:15
13. "Ceremonial Dance" – 1:59
14. "Flick of the Wrist" – 2:15
15. "It's All She Left Me" – 1:56
16. "You Shouldn't Do That" – 3:21
17. "Ring Song" (Katy Moffatt) – 4:25
18. "Thy Loving Hand" – 1:35
19. "Say Goodbye 'Cause You're Leavin'" – 2:36
20. "The Theme from Billy Jack" – 2:21
21. "One Tin Soldier (End Title)" (Lambert, Potter) – 1:06

=== Personnel ===
- Mundell Lowe: arranger, conductor
- Coven featuring Jinx Dawson (tracks 1 & 21), Teresa Kelly (tracks 4 & 5), Lynn Baker (tracks 6 & 10), Gwen Smith (track 7), Katy Moffatt (track 17): vocals
- Other unidentified musicians

== Influence ==
Marketed as an action film, the story focuses on the plight of Native Americans during the civil rights era. It attained a cult following among younger audiences due to its youth-oriented, anti-authority message and the then-novel martial arts fight scenes, which predate the Bruce Lee/kung fu movie trend that followed. The centerpiece of the film features Billy Jack, enraged over the mistreatment of his Native American friends, fighting racist thugs using hapkido techniques.

In 2019, it was revealed that writer-director Quentin Tarantino and actor Brad Pitt used the film and Laughlin's performance as an influence while developing Pitt's character Cliff Booth in Once Upon a Time in Hollywood.

== See also ==
- The Legend of Billie Jean
- The Trial of Billy Jack
