= The Return of Billy Jack =

Unfinished American film

- Directed by: Tom Laughlin
- Written by: Tom Laughlin
- Produced by: Tom Laughlin
- Starring: Tom Laughlin; Delores Taylor; Rodney Harvey
- Cinematography: Robert Saad
- Edited by: Raja Gosnell; Nicholas C. Smith
- Country: United States
- Language: English

The Return of Billy Jack is an unfinished theatrical film starring Tom Laughlin (who also directed), reprising his role as Billy Jack, and co-starring Rodney Harvey and Delores Taylor. The film was in production from December 1985 to early 1986 in New York City (with some scenes filmed in Central Park), with additional scenes filmed in Toronto. Only 17 minutes were filmed.

== Plot ==
Billy Jack takes on child pornographers in New York City.

== Production ==
During the course of its filming, Laughlin suffered a head injury when a breakaway bottle malfunctioned while filming a scene in Toronto. By the time he recovered, funds to complete the film were depleted, and production never resumed. Laughlin originally planned to sell the film to a major studio, but plans either fell through or were never realized. At the time production stopped, approximately only fifteen minutes of the motion picture had been filmed.

In addition, while filming was taking place in New York City, Laughlin broke up a street fight on Manhattan's West Side and made a citizen's arrest of a man following an argument over Laughlin's driving.

== Attempted revivals ==
Despite The Return of Billy Jack being unfinished, Laughlin attempted to make another Billy Jack film.

In March 2002, it was announced 3 Arts Entertainment and Danny DeVito's Jersey films were in negotiations with Laughlin for a new Billy Jack film with Keanu Reeves set to play the titular role. The following month, DreamWorks Pictures announced their intention to buy the distribution rights for the project for $400,000 against $1.5 million, with Laughlin and his wife Delores Taylor hoping to reprise their roles from the original series and setup passing the torch to Reeves.

After 3 Arts and Jersey Films dropped out, Laughlin negotiated with Intermedia for the rights to make yet another Billy Jack sequel, however that endeavor ended in a lawsuit, with the rights reverting back to Laughlin in 2004 Laughlin died on December 12, 2013.
