= Tom Simcox =

American actor

- Simcox in Code R, 1977
- Born: Thomas William Simcox; June 17, 1937 (age 89); Medford, New Jersey, U.S.
- Occupation: Actor
- Years active: 1962–1991
- Spouse: Kit Smythe

Thomas William Simcox (born June 17, 1937) is an American film and television actor.

== Early life ==
Simcox was born in Medford, New Jersey.

== Career ==
Simcox began his career in 1962, first appearing in the police procedural television series Naked City. He then made an appearance on the medical drama television series Ben Casey. He guest-starred in television programs including Gunsmoke, Bonanza, Hawaii Five-O, Matt Houston, Ironside, The Virginian, Vega$, Charlie's Angels, Trapper John, M.D., Perry Mason, Columbo and Wagon Train. In 1964, he made his film debut for which Simcox first appeared in the television film The Ghost of Sierra de Cobre. He then played the role of Lt. Johnson in the 1965 film Shenandoah.

Simcox starred in the 1966 film Incident at Phantom Hill, which also starred Robert Fuller, Jocelyn Lane and Dan Duryea. He also made an appearance in the 1976 film Hollywood Man, which starred William Smith, Ray Girardin, Jude Farese and Jennifer Billingsley. Simcox played the role of the sheriff. In 1977, he starred in the action and adventure television series Code R. His final credit was from Jack Webb's Dragnet remake which was The New Dragnet in 1991.

== Filmography ==
=== Film ===
Year	Title	Role	Notes
1965	Shenandoah	Lt. Johnson	
1966	Incident at Phantom Hill	Adam Long	
1972	Piranha	Art Greene	
1976	Hollywood Man	The Sheriff	
1990	Grim Prairie Tales	Horn	

=== Television ===
Year	Title	Role	Notes
1962	Naked City	Fred	Episode: "A Case Study of Two Savages"
1962	Ben Casey	Jerry Lavin	Episode: "When You See an Evil Man"
1962	Perry Mason	Waiter	Episode: "The Case of the Playboy Pugilist"
1962	Alcoa Premiere	Finney	Episode: "The Masked Marine"
1963	The Eleventh Hour	Joe Foster	Episode: "Hang by One Hand"
1963	Stoney Burke	Jeff Hadley	Episode: "Tigress by the Tail"
1963	The Lieutenant	Capt. Brett Parker	Episode: "To Take Up Serpents"
1963	Death Valley Days	Billy	Episode: "The Holy Terror"
1963	Channing	Art Townsend	Episode: "Beyond His Reach"
1963	The Great Adventure	Foord	Episode: "The Man Who Stole New York City"
1963–1974	Gunsmoke	Various roles	8 episodes
1964	The Ghost of Sierra de Cobre	Henry Mandore	Television film
1964, 1965	Wagon Train	Adam Pierce / Tim Riggs	2 episodes
1964, 1965	Alfred Hitchcock Presents	Jerry Walsh / John Sprague	2 episodes
1964–1969	The Virginian	Various roles	3 episodes
1965	Broadside	Bill Larsen	Episode: "The Wolfman Cometh"
1965	Bob Hope Presents the Chrysler Theatre	Lieutenant Walter Matthew	Episode: "The Filers"
1965	Bonanza	Andy Watson	Episode: "The Other Son"
1965	Diamond Jim: Skulduggery in Samantha	Walters	Television film
1966	Laredo	Shamus McCloud	Episode: "Sound of Terror"
1966	Run for Your Life	Johnny Cadell	Episode: "The Grotenberg Mask"
1966	The Doomsday Flight	Chipps	Television film
1966	The Iron Men	Noah Wylie	Television film
1966, 1967	Combat!	Dolan / Marsini	2 episodes
1967	The Green Hornet	Dan Scully	2 episodes
1969	Premiere	Braddock	Episode: "Braddock"
1968	Istanbul Express	Leland McCord	Television film
1968	Ironside	George Huff / Brian Turner	2 episodes
1970	Matt Lincoln	David Cunningham	Episode: "Jilly"
1970	The Aquarians	Jerry Hollis	Television film
1971	Bearcats!	Stengler	Episode: "Ground Loop at Spanish Wells"
1971	Monty Nash	Ed Stanley	Episode: "Tension in a Troubled Town"
1973	Hawaii Five-O	Anthony Porter	Episode: "The Sunday Torch"
1973	Emergency!	Brad	Episode: "Promotion"
1974	Columbo	William Haynes	Episode: "By Dawn's Early Light"
1976	Gibbsville	Smith	Episode: "Afternoon Waltz"
1976, 1978	Police Story	Sgt. Duvall / Officer Stover	2 episodes
1977	The Ghost of Cypress Swamp	Pa Bascombe	Television film
1977	Code R	Walt Robinson	13 episodes
1977	Charlie's Angels	Lon Molton	Episode: "Angel in Love"
1977–1980	The Magical World of Disney	Pa Bascombe	3 episodes
1978	Baretta	Anderson	Episode: "The Appointment"
1978	How the West Was Won	Marshal Logan	2 episodes
1979	David Cassidy: Man Undercover	Dixon	Episode: "Teammates"
1980	Vegas	Mr. Gleaver	Episode: "Magic Sister Slayings"
1983	Matt Houston	Gershwin	Episode: "Needle in a Haystack"
1983	Whiz Kids	Loring	Episode: "Candidate for Murder"
1983–1986	Simon & Simon	Various roles	3 episodes
1985	Trapper John, M.D.	Mr. Michaelson	Episode: "A False Start"
1985	Street Hawk	Keller	Episode: "The Arabian"
1986	Knight Rider	Deputy Clark	Episode: "Hills of Fire"
1986	Acceptable Risks	Joe Reed	Television film
1986	Airwolf	Weldon Rossiter	Episode: "The Girl Who Fell from the Sky"
1991	Dragnet	Mr. Cerone	Episode: "Who Killed My Boat?"
