= Robert C. Dennis =

Canadian-born American pulp author and screenwriter

- Born: November 17, 1915; Courtright, Ontario, Canada
- Died: September 14, 1983 (aged 67); Los Angeles, U.S.A.
- Other name: Robert Cecil Dennis
- Occupations: Author of pulp stories, radio scripts, teleplays, screenplays and novels
- Years active: 1938–1980s

Robert Cecil Dennis (November 17, 1915 – September 14, 1983) was an author of pulp fiction, radio plays, over 500 teleplays, and two novels.

== Biography ==
Dennis was born on November 17, 1915, in Courtright, Ontario, to parents Earl Sylvester Dennis and Clara Edith Huff. He had two brothers, Wilford Claude Dennis and Marion Jean Dennis, and was half brother to Iva Loretta Dennis and John Arthur Dennis.

In 1933, he graduated from Sarnia Collegiate Institute and Technical School.

Keen on playing semi-professional baseball, as well as following the advice of a doctor who suggested moving to a warmer and drier climate, Dennis travelled to Los Angeles. Arthritis dashed his hopes of playing for the major leagues.

== Pulp fiction ==
His later writing partner Earl Barret recalled that Dennis took an aptitude test at a Los Angeles school that said Dennis should be a writer.

"That was the last thing in the world he thought he was qualified for," Barret said. But the school officials convinced the young man to sign up for a writing class. "He found out later that the only reason he qualified to be a writer was because they needed one more student, or the class was going to be cancelled."

Dennis had his first short story, Rubber Proof published in Street & Smith's Detective Story Magazine in February 1938, beginning a prolific career writing over 150 mostly mystery stories.

He married Eileen Whitfield (1907–1981) on November 8, 1941, in Los Angeles. Dennis's future writing partner Earl Barret recalled Dennis was an expert at spelling, wrote his stories and scripts on yellow legal pads, and had his wife type them out.

== Radio and television ==
Dennis moved into writing mystery stories for American radio on the 1947 The Cases of Mr. Ace, an outgrowth of the George Raft film Mr. Ace.

He moved into television in 1950, creating and writing Mysteries of Chinatown, China Smith (1952), The New Adventures of China Smith (1954), Passport to Danger (1954) and television pilots for The Tracers (1955) and Expert Witness (1958) that aired as Hide and Seek on Fireside Theatre. Dennis complained that producers would change his scripts from anything for 10 to 100%.

In 1955, Dennis penned the first of 30 episodes of Alfred Hitchcock Presents, both original pieces and adaptations of other writers, and 22 episodes of Perry Mason.

Dennis began motion picture screenwriting in 1955 with Crime Against Joe, The Man is Armed, Revolt at Fort Laramie (1957) and My World Dies Screaming (1958) filmed in Psychorama.

He was a prolific television writer throughout the 1960s for a variety of popular American television series. He met Earl Barret through Barret's mother who was taking one of Dennis' writing classes. "No matter how busy he was, no matter what show he was working on, he gave a free class every Wednesday night", Barret said. The two cooperated on several projects, including dreaming up King Tut for Batman (1966) when the producers requested the pair to come up with new villains for the series because the old regular villains were demanding too much money.

Dennis wrote into the 1980s, writing several Dan August television films. His final work was a script for the police drama T.J. Hooker.

== Novels ==
Dennis authored two novels, The Sweat of Fear (1973) and Conversations with a Corpse (1974).

== Personal life ==
Dennis divorced Eileen Whitfield on April 27, 1953, and remarried Leta Bernice Peterson on June 4, 1969, until his death September 14, 1983. He was survived by five children and two sisters.

== Death ==
Dennis died on September 14, 1983, in Los Angeles, California, at the age of 67. He is buried at Forest Lawn Memorial Park in California.
