= Gloria Marshall =

American actress

- Publicity Photo of Gloria Marshall
- Born: August 27, 1931
- Died: December 18, 1994 (aged 63)

Gloria Marshall (August 27, 1931 – December 18, 1994) was an American actress seen on television in the 1950s in mainly small parts. She portrayed Evelyn Phelps in the 1954 episode, "Husband Pro-Tem", of the anthology series, Death Valley Days, hosted by Stanley Andrews, with Jock Mahoney in the starring role as engineer Andy Prentis.

Marshall also appeared in The Beverly Hillbillies and Sea Hunt and The Bob Cummings Show. She was in two films, Escape to Burma (1955) and Roadraceers (1959).

== Filmography ==
Year	Title	Role	Notes
1955	Escape to Burma		
1959	Roadraceers		

== Selected Television ==
Year	Title	Role	Notes
1955	Death Valley Days	Evelyn Phelps	Season 2, Episode 14, "Husband Pro-Tem"
1957	Gunsmoke	Season 2, Episode 21, "Bloody Hands"	Linda
1959	Beverly HillbilliesSeason 1, Episode 16,		Episode Back to Californy, Airline Hostess.
1960	The Bob Cummings Show.		Episode
1961	Sea Hunt		Season 4, Episode 12
