= Code R =

American action-adventure television series

- Genre: Action; Adventure
- Starring: James Houghton; Martin Kove; Tom Simcox; Joan Freeman; Susanne Reed; Ben Davidson; Robbie Rundle; W. T. Zacha
- Theme music composer: Lee Holdridge
- Country of origin: United States
- Original language: English
- No. of seasons: 1
- No. of episodes: 13

Production
- Producer: Edwin Self
- Camera setup: Single-camera
- Running time: 44 minutes
- Production company: Warner Bros. Television

Original release
- Network: CBS
- Release: January 21 – June 10, 1977

Code R is an American action-adventure television series that aired on CBS from January 21 to June 10, 1977. Code R focuses on the emergency services (police, fire, and ocean rescue) of the California Channel Islands. The series starred James Houghton, Martin Kove and Tom Simcox and ran for a single season of thirteen episodes.

== Synopsis ==
Simcox was cast as Walt Robinson, the island police chief. Joan Freeman played his wife, Barbara, and Robbie Rundle appeared as their young son, Bobby. Former professional footballer Ben Davidson played Walt's police deputy, Ted Milbank. Houghton was cast as Rick Wilson, chief of the island's fire services, and Kove was George Baker, the chief of beaches and ocean rescue. As all of the Island's Emergency Services were based in the same building, Susanne Reed played Suzy, their dispatch operator. WT Zacha played Harry, the owner and bartender of the Lighthouse Bar where the rescue teams often went while off-duty.

== Episodes ==
No.	Title	Original release date
1	"High Adventure"	January 21, 1977
2	"The Great Boat Race"	January 28, 1977
3	"Mutiny"	February 4, 1977
4	"A Federal Case"	February 11, 1977
5	"The Invaders"	February 18, 1977
6	"The Firebug"	February 25, 1977
7	"Suzy's Day Off"	March 4, 1977
8	"The Drifter"	March 11, 1977
9	"Grounded"	April 1, 1977
10	"Beauty and the Beach"	April 15, 1977
11	"Black Out"	April 22, 1977
12	"The Aliens"	June 3, 1977
13	"Decisions"	June 10, 1977
