= Brute Corps =

- Film poster
- Directed by: Jerry Jameson
- Written by: Michael Kars; Abe Polsky
- Starring: Alex Rocco; Felton Perry; Paul Carr; Joseph Kaufmann; Jennifer Billingsley; Michael Pataki; Charles Macaulay
- Music by: Jack Walker
- Release date: 1971
- Running time: 87 minutes
- Country: United States
- Language: English

Brute Corps is a 1971 American exploitation film. It was the directorial debut of Jerry Jameson.

== Plot ==
Kevin, a draft dodging pacifist and Terry, a beautiful hitchhiker, travel to Mexico and encounter a gang of mercenaries awaiting their next mission. Wicks, a psychotic mercenary, takes a liking to the woman and sets the couple on a brutal course of torture and pain.

== Cast ==
- Paul Carr - Ross
- Joseph Kaufmann - Kevin
- Alex Rocco - Wicks
- Jennifer Billingsley - Terry
- Michael Pataki - MacFarlane
- Charles Macaulay - The Colonel
- Roy Jenson - Quinn
- Felton Perry - Hill
- Joseph Bernard - Sheriff Alvarez
- Parker West as Ballard
