= The Ghost of Sierra de Cobre =

- Genre: Horror; Mystery; Thriller
- Written by: Joseph Stefano
- Directed by: Joseph Stefano
- Starring: Martin Landau; Judith Anderson; Diane Baker; Tom Simcox
- Music by: Dominic Frontiere
- Country of origin: United States
- Original language: English

Production
- Producer: Joseph Stefano
- Cinematography: Conrad Hall
- Editor: Tony Di Marco
- Running time: 80 minutes
- Production companies: Villa Di Stefano; United Artists Television

Original release
- Network: CBS
- Release: 1964

The Ghost of Sierra de Cobre is a 1964 American made-for-television horror–thriller film starring Martin Landau, Judith Anderson and Diane Baker. It was written, produced and directed by Joseph Stefano, author of the screenplay for Alfred Hitchcock's 1960 thriller Psycho, and he cast actors who had been in Hitchcock's films. Landau was in North by Northwest (1959), Anderson was in Rebecca, and Baker was in Marnie (1964). Four of the cast members appeared in episodes of The Outer Limits during Stefano's Season 1 tenure: Landau, Burt, Stone, and Morrill.

The film was a pilot for a proposed supernatural anthology series for CBS called The Haunted. The series was not picked up after CBS president James T. Aubrey left but some additional footage was filmed and it was released as a standalone film.

== Plot ==
Nelson Orion (Martin Landau) is an architect by profession and paranormal investigator by choice. He is engaged by heiress Vivia Mandore (Diane Baker) who mistakenly thought herself free from the domination of her recently deceased mother-in-law. However, the old woman appears determined to continue her controlling ways... from beyond the grave.

== Cast ==
- Martin Landau as Nelson Orion
- Judith Anderson as Paulina
- Diane Baker as Vivia Mandore
- Tom Simcox as Henry Mandore
- Nellie Burt as Mary Finch
- Leonard Stone as Benedict Sloane
- Priscilla Morrill as The School Teacher
- Dolores Starr as blonde woman on beach (uncredited)
