= Passport to Danger (TV series) =

American adventure TV series

- restored episodes DVD box
- Created by: Robert C. Dennis
- Starring: Cesar Romero
- Country of origin: United States

Original release
- Release: 1954 – 1958

Passport to Danger is an American TV series which ran 1954–1958 in first-run syndication.

== Premise and actors ==
Passport to Danger starred Cesar Romero as Steve McQuinn, a U.S. diplomatic courier and spy. Episodes illustrated ways in which other countries' spies tried to steal classified U. S. documents. Other cast included Charles Horvath, and Victor Romito.

Guest stars included Carolyn Jones.

== Production ==
The show was created by Robert C. Dennis and produced by Hal Roach Jr. and Jerry Stagg. Two years elapsed between its 1952 pilot and the beginning of production in 1954. In that interval, Romero could have taken the lead in The Lone Wolf TV show, but a $16,000 option payment kept him available for Passport to Danger.

Filming occurred in Hollywood, with settings of foreign locales provided by use of stock footage.

An article in the trade publication Billboard described the show's pilot as having high production values and said the show "packs a suspense wallop".

In 1956 A. B. C. Film Syndication, Incorporated, sold the series to TV stations in Nagoya and Osaka, Japan, where they were to be shown "as is, without Japanese sound-tracks."
