= Young and Willing =

1943 film by Virginia Van Upp, Edward H. Griffith

- Theatrical release poster
- Directed by: Edward H. Griffith
- Screenplay by: Virginia Van Upp
- Based on: Out of the Frying Pan by Francis Swann
- Produced by: Edward H. Griffith
- Starring: William Holden; Eddie Bracken; Robert Benchley; Susan Hayward
- Cinematography: Leo Tover
- Edited by: Eda Warren
- Music by: Victor Young
- Production companies: Paramount Pictures; Cinema Guild Productions
- Distributed by: United Artists
- Release date: February 5, 1943 (United States)
- Running time: 83 minutes
- Country: United States
- Language: English

Young and Willing is a 1943 American comedy film produced and directed by Edward H. Griffith and starring William Holden, Eddie Bracken, Robert Benchley, and Susan Hayward. With a screenplay by Virginia Van Upp based on the play Out of the Frying Pan by Francis Swann, the film is about young, aspiring actors—three men and three women—who combine their resources and move into the same apartment, hoping to keep the landlady in the dark until they can become famous. Young and Willing was made by Paramount Pictures (as Cinema Guild Productions) and distributed by United Artists.

== Plot ==
Struggling young actors (three males and three females) share an apartment to make ends meet. This scenario is pretty daring considering the conservative and censorious attitudes of that period. The landlady provides a play to the actors that turns out to have been left behind long ago by a destitute, evicted tenant (Robert Benchley). That former tenant is now a successful theater producer and playwright who has recently taken a room in his old haunts to recharge his creativity and try to rewrite his first play—one that the landlady had kept when he was evicted. The young actors attempt to sell his own play to him. Complications begin when Cousin Muriel (Florence MacMichael) visits and discovers the sinful cohabitation; she tattles to her folks, who charge over to investigate and drag the daughters home. Silliness and mayhem ensue, propelled by Muriel's actions and highlighted by her unique little-girl, tattletale voice.

== Cast ==
- William Holden as Norman Reese
- Eddie Bracken as George Bodell
- Robert Benchley as Arthur Kenny
- Susan Hayward as Kate Benson
- Martha O'Driscoll as Dottie Coburn
- Barbara Britton as Marge Benson Dennison
- Mabel Paige as Mrs. Garnet
- Florence MacMichael as Muriel Foster
- James Brown as Tony Dennison
- Jay Fassett as J.T. Coburn
- Paul Hurst as First Cop
- Olin Howland as Second Cop
- Billy Bevan as Phillips

== Production ==
The play on which the film is based opened at the Windsor Theatre, New York City, on February 11, 1941, with Alfred Drake, Barbara Bel Geddes, and Mabel Paige in the cast.

== Reception ==
The film was described as a "light farce comedy that has to do with a care-free group of young actors and actresses all living together."
