= Incident at Phantom Hill =

1966 film by Earl Bellamy

- Directed by: Earl Bellamy
- Screenplay by: Frank Nugent; Ken Pettus
- Story by: Harry Tatelman
- Produced by: Harry Tatelman
- Starring: Robert Fuller; Jocelyn Lane; Dan Duryea; Tom Simcox
- Cinematography: William Margulies
- Edited by: Gene Milford
- Music by: Hans J. Salter
- Color process: Technicolor
- Production company: Universal Pictures
- Distributed by: Universal Pictures
- Release date: July 1, 1966
- Running time: 88 minutes
- Country: United States
- Language: English

Incident at Phantom Hill is a 1966 American Techniscope Western film, directed by Earl Bellamy and starring: Robert Fuller, Jocelyn Lane, Dan Duryea and Tom Simcox.

The story involves a Union gold shipment, which is stolen and buried in the desert. Both Union and rebel forces struggle to find it while threatened by the Comanche. A romance complicates the action.

== Plot ==
At the end of the American Civil War, a group of Southern rebels steal a Union shipment of gold and bury it in a cave near an area known as Fort Phantom Hill, Texas. After they are captured by Union forces, their leader secretly makes a deal with the army to reveal the gold's location in return for his release; a release based on a pardon promised him by the Confederate States of America at the beginning of the Civil War.

An army captain and four other men are given the job of accompanying the rebel on the journey to locate the gold. As the men are getting ready to leave, they are compelled to take with them a woman who is essentially being ordered out of town. She and the captain are attracted to each other, though initially the relationship is not warm.

Phantom Hill is located on land newly assigned to the Comanche and the group must deal with hostilities from them. Eventually, after the gold is located, the rebel gets one of the group drunk, kills him and steals his gun. He kills another man, then escapes with the group's weaponry, the wagon filled with the gold, and the woman. The remaining men, without guns, must again face the Comanche. After this confrontation, only the captain and one other remain alive. They set off in pursuit of the rebel.

Enjoying some unexpected luck, the two arrive ahead of the rebel and the woman at a location important to all of them, due to their need of water. A short pursuit occurs which ends when the woman tosses a rifle to the captain, who kills the rebel. The three survivors begin the return trek, to deliver the gold to the American government.

== Cast ==
As appearing in order of screen credits (main roles identified):

- Robert Fuller as Matt Martin
- Jocelyn Lane as Memphis
- Dan Duryea as Joe Barlow
- Tom Simcox as Adam Long
- Linden Chiles as Dr. Hanneford
- Claude Akins as Krausman
- Noah Beery Jr. as O'Rourke (as Noah Beery)
- Paul Fix as General Hood
- Denver Pyle as 1st Hunter
- William Phipps as Trader
- Don Collier as S. Drum
- Mickey Finn as 2nd Hunter

== See also ==
- List of American films of 1966
