= Welcome Home, Soldier Boys =

1971 film by Richard Compton

- Theatrical release poster
- Directed by: Richard Compton
- Written by: Guerdon Trueblood
- Produced by: Marvin Schwartz
- Starring: Joe Don Baker; Paul Koslo; Alan Vint; Elliott Street; Jennifer Billingsley; Billy "Green" Bush
- Cinematography: Donald H. Birnkrant
- Edited by: Patrick Kennedy
- Music by: Ronee Blakley; Country Gazette
- Production company: 20th Century Fox
- Distributed by: 20th Century Fox
- Release date: December 10, 1971
- Running time: 91 minutes
- Country: United States
- Language: English

Welcome Home, Soldier Boys is a 1971 American drama film directed by Richard Compton and starring Joe Don Baker, Paul Koslo, Alan Vint, Elliott Street, Jennifer Billingsley and Billy "Green" Bush. Written by Guerdon Trueblood, the film was released on December 10, 1971, by 20th Century Fox. The website Letterboxd lists this movie as belonging to the vetsploitation subgenre.

== Plot ==
Danny, Shooter, Kid and Fatback are a group of four veterans returning home from Vietnam who decide to subsequently go on a road trip. They decided to purchase a Cadillac, managing to hustle the price down from $6,200 to $5,500 from the dealer and load the Cadillac with weapons. On their way they pick up a girl who begins to party with the gang, having sex with them, but after she demands money from the gang Danny assaults her and throws her out of the car driving at 65 mph, killing her.

The gang decide to visit a bunch of old settlements, meet up in a basketball court inside of a local high school and watching the game, reminiscing on the old times at the school. They meet up in a motel and order a room, where they are accompanied by various women where they play around and start to somewhat discuss about their pasts. Eventually, they leave and try to find another place to stay and crack up a deal with the sheriff in order to allow them to use the cells as a place to stay for the night. He agrees but treats the event almost as if he's performing a routine arrest in order to keep with policy.

Their car breaks down and eventually they must seek repairs culminating in a total of $1,400 which they eventually pay up after an argument, and then get back to driving. The gang eventually meet up in a diner where they apparently have won $50 from a contest although the diner can not pay up, so the gang eventually steal from the cash register and make the owner prepare a bunch of meals in order to recuperate for the cost. They drive off again and eventually stop at a gas pump, although they are completely broke.

Danny tries to vandalise a gas-pump in order to steal gas from it, when someone peers out the window with a shotgun and shoots at the gang, before eventually being shot by one of the gang members in retaliation. The rest of the gang eventually arm up and go on a killing spree, killing everybody in the village and subsequently destroying various vehicles and houses. The gang begin to experience intense memories of their time in Vietnam and dress up in uniform - taking the village as their own, almost like a compound of their own.

Amidst the chaos, the National Guard are called in to dispatch the soldiers, replete with a convoy of armoured vehicles and a helicopter. The gang manage to shoot the helicopter down with a rocket launcher. The National Guard attempt to dispatch the soldiers by throwing gas bombs down on the area causing the gang to slowly suffocate. A troop of National Guardsmen wearing gas masks slowly march towards the gang, each with a rifle in hand, and the gang decide to retaliate against the guardsmen by throwing grenades at them and trying to shoot them, but each of them are shot dead by the guardsmen.

The final shot is of an unknown woman walking slowly among the carnage resulting from the massacre, over a voice-over of Danny reading the Oath of Enlistment at the recruitment centre.

== Cast ==
- Joe Don Baker as Danny
- Paul Koslo as Shooter
- Alan Vint as Kid
- Elliott Street as Fatback
- Jennifer Billingsley as Broad
- Billy "Green" Bush as Sheriff
- Geoffrey Lewis as Francis Rapture
- Francine York as Lydia
- Timothy Scott as Mike
- Lonny Chapman as Danny's Father
- Florence MacMichael as Danny's Mother
- Cherie Foster as Gloria
- Beach Dickerson as Used Car Salesman
- Ted Markland as Hick #1
- Joel Lawrence as Trooper
- Luanne Roberts as Charlene
- Damienne Oliver as Ruby

== See also ==
- List of American films of 1971
