= Ten Girls Ago =

1962 unfinished film

- Film crew celebrating Buster's 40 years in show business
- Directed by: Harold Daniels
- Starring: Buster Keaton; Bert Lahr; Eddie Foy Jr. Dion DiMucci; Jennifer Billingsley; Jan Miner
- Cinematography: Lee Garmes
- Distributed by: Can-Am Productions
- Running time: 32 minutes
- Countries: United States, Canada
- Language: English

Ten Girls Ago is an unfinished American-Canadian film shot in 1962 and directed by Harold Daniels. Buster Keaton, Bert Lahr and Eddie Foy Jr. appeared in the planned widescreen color musical film. It was to be the starring debut of Dion and the return of three Hollywood comic legends. Production began at Toronto International Film Studios in March, 1962, but the feature film was never finished. It was 98% complete before a series of mishaps shut the production down

== Plot ==
Bert Lahr plays an old-time comic who experiences a decline in popularity due to the newest talent of a Basset Hound on television.

== Cast ==
- Buster Keaton as Casper Dan
- Bert Lahr as Ed Dooley
- Eddie Foy Jr. as Gopher Garson
- Dion DiMucci as Tad Martin
- Jennifer Billingsley as Dollina
- Riselle Bain as Jamie Jackson
- Jan Miner as Aunt Minnie
- Pokey as Nellie

== Production ==
Jennifer Billingsley: "That Keaton is the craziest! We love Buster. Yesterday he fell through a crate by accident. And you know, he didn't even change his expression! Can you imagine that? Most people would have at least looked surprised if they fell through a crate."

Eddie Foy Jr.: "You know, this picture would have cost $3 million in Hollywood. They could make it here in Canada for half a million! They only got into money trouble here because they didn't budget right. Look, we came in on schedule, even though we had some sickness and power trouble. But I'll tell you one thing. The investors will get their money back. I wish I owned this picture. It's a nice little picture."

Bert Lahr: "They came to me. I read the script. It wasn't good. They were giving me a three-week guarantee for a tremendous amount of money. When I read the script, I realized they couldn't get it done in twenty weeks. It was a real amateur situation."

Dion DiMucci: "Only Keaton was friendly. We used to shoot a little pool, but the others paid no attention to me. Foy was in another world, and once I saw him duck behind the set and throw up. Lahr was always trying to upstage everyone. But Buster was sweet and quiet."

Jan Miner: "They [Keaton, Lahr and Foy Jr.] played three bums who lived in the park, and I ran a cafeteria and used to feed them coffee on the sly. The picture never came out but it was brilliant. It took six months to make this one movie. I remember I started out across a bridge in the park carrying a Basset Hound puppy, and six months later when the sequence was completed I came off that bridge carrying a full-sized Basset Hound.

John Darch (the dog trainer): "I'd cover Lahr's face with liver paste. Pokey loved liver. Everytime the director wanted Pokey to lick Lahr's face on went the liver paste."

Buster Keaton: "I wonder how this movie will work out. I'm dying to see the ending."
