= Lady in a Cage =

1964 film by Walter Grauman

- 1964 Theatrical poster
- Directed by: Walter Grauman
- Written by: Luther Davis
- Produced by: Luther Davis
- Starring: Olivia de Havilland; James Caan
- Cinematography: Lee Garmes
- Edited by: Leon Barsha
- Music by: Paul Glass
- Production companies: AEC; Luther Davis Productions
- Distributed by: Paramount Pictures
- Release date: July 8, 1964
- Running time: 94 minutes
- Country: United States
- Language: English
- Box office: $1.65 million (US/ Canada)

Lady in a Cage is a 1964 American psychological thriller film directed by Walter Grauman, written and produced by Luther Davis, and starring Olivia de Havilland and James Caan. The film was released by Paramount Pictures.

== Plot ==
When an electrical power failure occurs, Cornelia Hilyard, a wealthy widow recuperating from a broken hip, becomes trapped between floors in the cage-like elevator she has installed in her mansion. With her son, Malcolm, away for the Fourth of July weekend, she relies on the elevator's emergency alarm to attract attention, but the only response comes from an unsympathetic alcoholic derelict, George Brady, who steals some small items from the house.

The wino sells the stolen goods to a fence, Mr. Paul, visits his hustler friend Sade, and tells her of the treasure trove he has stumbled upon. The expensive goods George fences attract the attention of three young hoodlums, Randall O'Connell, Elaine and Essie. They follow George and Sade to the house, where Cornelia lives. Cornelia begs them for help, offering to let them take whatever they want and promising not to report them to the police so long as they free her. Instead, the intruders mock her, as they ransack her home and become roaring drunk on the contents of her liquor cabinet. As Cornelia watches in horror, the intruders perform an orgy, killing George and locking Sade in a closet.

Randall pulls himself up to the elevator and taunts Cornelia by suggesting that Malcolm might be gay. Randall shows her a letter that Malcolm left on her nightstand that morning, in which Malcolm threatens suicide because of her domineering manner. Shocked by the revelation, Cornelia faints. Shortly afterwards, Paul and his goons arrive to steal the goods from the hoodlums' car. After Cornelia regains consciousness, she breaks the elevator door and uses the broken pieces to make a pair of shivs. She falls to the floor and injures herself, but manages to crawl to the front door, before Randall returns. As he drags Cornelia back inside the house, she stabs him in the eyes with the shivs. He goes inside the house and commands his accomplices to bring her inside. Once in the doorway, Cornelia mocks Randall's blindness and his cohorts join in, leaving him to stumble aimlessly through the living room. Her violent act, coupled with the stress of the whole ordeal, causes Cornelia to experience temporary insanity and leave her disoriented.

As the thieves start to leave, Cornelia mistakes Essie for Malcolm and speaks to him in a daze, expressing guilt over her monstrous hold on her son. She crawls out the front door again and Randall pursues Cornelia outside. Randall stumbles onto the road and is struck and killed by a car. Numerous witnesses stop for the accident and rescue Cornelia. As the police arrive, Essie and Elaine attempt to flee in a car, but they crash into the electric box, which restarts the power in the house and the elevator descends to the floor. Essie and Elaine are arrested, while the others comfort the distraught Cornelia.

== Cast ==
- Olivia de Havilland as Mrs. Cornelia Hilyard
- James Caan as Randall Simpson O'Connell
- Jennifer Billingsley as Elaine
- Jeff Corey as George L. Brady Jr. aka Repent
- Ann Sothern as Sade
- Rafael Campos as Essie
- William Swan as Malcolm Hilyard
- Charles Seel as Mr. Paul (Junkyard Proprietor)
- Scatman Crothers as Junkyard Proprietor's Assistant
- Richard Kiel as Pawn shop strongman (uncredited)
- Ron Nyman as Neighbor (uncredited)

== Production ==
The film is based on an original idea by Davis, when he was working on a play about the effects of a power outage on the inhabitants of a house in oil country in the Midwest. The incident turned into a battle for survival, one in which Davis shifted the action in his story from a house to an elevator "since like so many New Yorkers I have a sense of claustrophobia in these little automatic elevators." He later said he was also inspired by the New York blackout of August 17, 1959. He knew a lady who was trapped in the elevator of a private residence on the city's Upper East Side. She called for help and was heard by two men who raped her. During his research, he learned that all elevators in New York have to be equipped with a phone, which would have ruined the story, so the film is set in an unnamed city.

The film was announced in August 1962 with Ralph Nelson to direct and Robert Webber attached as star. Joan Crawford and Elizabeth Montgomery were being sought for the female lead. Rosalind Russell was offered the part but turned it down. In December 1962, Olivia de Havilland took the leading role. Her fee was $300,000. Grauman signed as director, rather than the originally intended Nelson. Filming took place in February 1963. It took fourteen days and de Havilland called the experience "wonderful", praising the talent of James Caan (in his first credited role).

== Reception ==
Commercially, the film was profitable for Paramount.

The film was initially met with negative reviews from critics who thought it to be vulgar and substandard for a performer of de Havilland's prestige. Bosley Crowther wrote a special column in The New York Times criticising the film, calling it "reprehensible", which led to a press controversy. Columnist Hedda Hopper wrote, "The picture should be burned [...] Why did Olivia do it?". Variety believed that there is "not a single redeeming character or characteristic" in the "vulgar screenplay", criticizing de Havilland's performance as Oscar bait and Caan's as a copy of Marlon Brando. The Pittsburgh Post-Gazette also negatively compared Caan's performance to that of Brando, while criticizing the story's perceived plot holes. Time mentioned that the film "adds Olivia de Havilland to the list of cinema actresses who would apparently rather be freaks than be forgotten".

Re-evaluated decades later, the film is now seen as one that represented the turbulence and changes of society in the 1960s, and a "deeply disturbing thriller". TV Guide gives it 3 stars out of 5 and calls it "realistic, intense". In his Movie Guide, film critic Leonard Maltin gives it three out of four stars: "unpleasant to watch, but undeniably truthful and prophetic." FilmInk magazine said in 2022, "The film's been reappraised in recent years, deservedly, as the tough, unusual thriller it is, even if it only has half an hour's worth of plot if you're honest about it".

== Home media ==
The film was released on Region 1 DVD on March 29, 2005.

== See also ==
- List of films featuring home invasions
