= Lock-Up (TV series) =

American television series

- Video cover
- Genre: Crime drama
- Directed by: Walter Doniger; Fred Hamilton; Jack Herzberg; Henry S. Kesler; Otto Lang
- Starring: Macdonald Carey; John Doucette
- Country of origin: United States
- Original language: English
- No. of seasons: 2
- No. of episodes: 78

Production
- Executive producer: Frederick W. Ziv
- Producers: Jack Herzberg; Henry S. Kesler
- Camera setup: Single-camera
- Running time: 30 minutes
- Production companies: Ziv Television Programs; United Artists Television

Original release
- Network: Syndication
- Release: September 26, 1959 – June 17, 1961

Lock-Up is an American crime drama series that premiered in syndication in September 1959 and concluded in June 1961. The half-hour episodes had little time for character development or subplots. It instead presented a compact story without embellishment.

== Series overview ==
The program stars Macdonald Carey as real-life Philadelphia corporate attorney Herbert L. Maris (1880–1960) and John Doucette as police detective Lieutenant Jim Weston. Maris died during the program's initial run.

Each episode began with the following introduction: "These stories are based on the files and case histories of Herbert L. Maris, prominent attorney, who has devoted his life to saving the innocent."

The foundation of each episode is the cornerstone of English and American jurisprudence: a person charged with a crime is innocent until proven guilty in a court of law. The series featured stories of persons who were unjustly accused, usually due to circumstantial evidence. The program's primary theme is that when individuals are charged with a crime, not all is as it first appears and a thorough investigation is duly warranted in order to uncover vital facts pertinent to the case.

Herbert L. Maris had an uncanny sense about the honest, innocent persons who had been falsely accused. With his lucrative private practice of corporate law, he also had the time and resources to help these people. He was an attorney who spent his spare time helping defendants unjustly charged by the State. The stories portrayed in this series do not involve federal crimes.

== Episodes ==
=== Season 1 (1959–60) ===
No. overall	No. in season	Title	Directed by	Written by	Original release date
1	1	"Stake Out"	Henry S. Kesler	Gene L. Coon	September 26, 1959
2	2	"The Harry Connors Story"	Paul Guilfoy	Charles Larson	October 3, 1959
3	3	"Change of Heart"	Robert Florey	Malvin Wald & Mortimer Braus	October 10, 1959
4	4	"The Failure"	Henry S. Kesler	Jack Jacobs	October 17, 1959
5	5	"End of the World"	Henry S. Kesler	Guy de Vry	October 24, 1959
6	6	"Shadow of a Giant"	Henry S. Kesler	Stanley H. Silverman	October 31, 1959
7	7	"Presumption of Guilt"	Henry S. Kesler	Donn Mullally	November 7, 1959
8	8	"The Angry Men"	Walter Doniger	Mikhail Rykoff	November 14, 1959
9	9	"Writ of Terror"	Henry S. Kesler	Story by : Alexander Richards and Stanley H. Silverman & Stan Cutler; Teleplay by : Stanley H. Silverman & Stan Cutler	November 21, 1959
10	10	"Music to Murder By"	Jack Herzberg	Robert Dillon & Anthony Lawrence	November 28, 1959
11	11	"With Malice for One"	Eddie Davis	Stanley H. Silverman	December 5, 1959
12	12	"Framed Ex-Con"	Dane Clark	Lee Berg	December 12, 1959
13	13	"Death in the Streets"	Eddie Davis	George & Gertrude Fass	December 19, 1959
14	14	"The Drop"	Dane Clark	Story by : Robert E. Thompson & Phil Tucker; Teleplay by : Robert E. Thompson	December 26, 1959
15	15	"The Manly Art of Murder"	Henry S. Kesler	Richard Baer	January 2, 1960
16	16	"A Reputation"	Unknown	Unknown	January 9, 1960
17	17	"His Father's Footsteps"	Dane Clark	Bob Mitchell	January 16, 1960
18	18	"Price of Charity"	Eddie Davis	George & Gertrude Fass	January 23, 1960
19	19	"Never Bet the Odds"	Henry S. Kesler	Gene Lesser	January 30, 1960
20	20	"Morality and the Shield"	Otto Lang	Tom Gries	February 6, 1960
21	21	"Dead Man's Shoes"	Henry S. Kesler	Stanley H. Silverman & Stan Cutler	February 13, 1960
22	22	"Strange Summons"	Jack Herzberg	Meyer Dolinsky	February 20, 1960
23	23	"Murder Plays It Cool"	Jack Herzberg	Story by : Joel Malcolm Rapp; Teleplay by : Joel Malcolm Rapp & Jack Rock	February 27, 1960
24	24	"Election Night"	Jack Herzberg	Jack Rock	March 5, 1960
25	25	"Poker Club"	William Conrad	Philip Saltzman	March 12, 1960
26	26	"The Trigger"	Franklin Adreon	Story by : Paul Franklin; Teleplay by : Paul Franklin & Jack Rock	March 19, 1960
27	27	"Murder is a Gamble"	Jack Herzberg	Robert Bloch	March 26, 1960
28	28	"Death and Texas"	Walter Doniger	Robert Bloch	April 2, 1960
29	29	"The Locket"	Jack Herzberg	Stuart Jerome	April 9, 1960
30	30	"The Trouble Cop"	Franklin Adreon	Anthony Spinner	April 16, 1960
31	31	"First Prize for Murder"	Walter Doniger	Stuart Jerome	April 23, 1960
32	32	"The Frame"	Jack Herzberg	Robert E. Thompson	April 30, 1960
33	33	"Society Marathon"	Leon Chooluck	Jack Rock	May 7, 1960
34	34	"Last Chance"	Franklin Adreon	Jack Jacobs	May 14, 1960
35	35	"Mind Over Murder"	Jack Herzberg	Meyer Dolinsky	May 21, 1960
36	36	"So Shall Ye Reap"	William Conrad	Sidney Morse	May 28, 1960
37	37	"Sentenced to Die"	Christian Nyby	Robert J. Shaw	June 4, 1960
38	38	"Voice of Doom"	Jack Herzberg	Robert Bloch	June 11, 1960
39	39	"The Blood Red Ruby"	Alan Crosland, Jr.	Guy De Vry	June 18, 1960

=== Season 2 (1960–61) ===
No. overall	No. in season	Title	Directed by	Written by	Original release date
40	1	"The Case of Joe Slade"	Jack Herzberg	Stuart Jerome	September 24, 1960
41	2	"The Tee Off"	Leon Benson	Sidney Morse	October 1, 1960
42	3	"Skid Row Story"	Eddie Davis	Stuart Jerome	October 8, 1960
43	4	"Flying High"	Jack Herzberg	Gene Lesser	October 15, 1960
44	5	"Beau and Arrow Case"	Eddie Davis	Robert Bloch	October 22, 1960
45	6	"The Frame Up"	Eddie Davis	Jack Rock	October 29, 1960
46	7	"Seventh Hour"	Jean Yarborow	Meyer Dolinsky	November 5, 1960
47	8	"The Sisters"	Jack Herzberg	Stuart Jerome	November 12, 1960
48	9	"Top Secret"	Leslie Goodwins	Gene Lesser	November 19, 1960
49	10	"Society Doctor"	Jack Herzberg	Teddi Sherman	November 26, 1960
50	11	"Number Please"	Fred Hamilton	Sidney Morse	December 3, 1960
51	12	"The Case of Alexis George"	Eddie Davis	Story by : George Callahan; Teleplay by : Jack Rock	December 10, 1960
52	13	"The Concrete Coffin"	Leslie Goodwins	Jack Lewis	December 17, 1960
53	14	"Compulsive Killer"	Leslie Goodwins	Jack Rock	December 24, 1960
54	15	"Girls Wanted"	Jack Herzberg	George & Gertrude Fass	December 31, 1960
55	16	"Diamond Dupe"	Leslie Goodwins	Vernon E. Clark	January 7, 1961
56	17	"His Brother's Keeper"	Jack Herzberg	Malvin Wald	January 14, 1961
57	18	"A Case of Arson"	Leslie Goodwins	George & Gertrude Fass	January 21, 1961
58	19	"Jennifer"	Fred Hamilton	Stuart Jerome	January 28, 1961
59	20	"Abandoned Mine"	Jack Herzberg	Robert Bloch	February 4, 1961
60	21	"A French Affair"	Joe MacDonald	Gene Lesser	February 11, 1961
61	22	"End of a Titan"	Henry S. Kesler	Stanley H. Silverman & Stan Cutler	February 18, 1961
62	23	"Fugitive from Fear"	Monroe Askins	Robert Bloomfield	February 25, 1961
63	24	"Design for Murder"	Jack Herzberg	Charles B. Smith	March 4, 1961
64	25	"Like Father, Like Son"	Leslie Goodwins	Monroe Manning & Alan Woods	March 11, 1961
65	26	"Red Confetti"	Jack Herzberg	Kathleen Blatz	March 18, 1961
66	27	"Planter's Death"	Jack Herzberg	Charles B. Smith	March 25, 1961
67	28	"Two Wrongs"	Leslie Goodwins	Bob Mitchell	April 1, 1961
68	29	"Jungle Compound"	Jack Herzberg	Jack Rock	April 8, 1961
69	30	"The Case of Willlie Betterly"	Joe MacDonald	Kathleen Blatz	April 15, 1961
70	31	"The Wildcatter"	Fred Hamilton	Gene Lesser	April 22, 1961
71	32	"The Accused"	Joe MacDonald	Stuart Jerome	April 29, 1961
72	33	"Leading Young Citizen"	Jack Herzberg	Vernon E. Clark	May 6, 1961
73	34	"Hurricane"	Jack Herzberg	Stuart Jerome	May 13, 1961
74	35	"Court Martial"	Unknown	Unknown	May 20, 1961
75	36	"Sacrifice Play"	Fred Hamilton	Bob Mitchell	May 27, 1961
76	37	"Face of Innocence"	Jack Herzberg	Kathleen Blatz	June 3, 1961
77	38	"The Intruder"	Jack Herzberg	Stuart Jerome	June 10, 1961
78	39	"The Case of Nan Havens"	Monroe P. Askins	Story by : Leigh Jason; Teleplay by : Jack Rock	June 17, 1961

== Guest stars ==
Among the many guest stars on the show were:

- Dyan Cannon
- Paul Carr
- John Carradine
- Albert Carrier
- Jean Carson
- Jack Cassidy
- Lon Chaney Jr.
- Andy Clyde
- Robert Conrad
- John Considine
- Ellen Corby
- Walter Coy
- Angie Dickinson
- James Drury
- Buddy Ebsen
- Don Eitner
- Ross Elliott
- Joe Flynn
- James Griffith
- Neil Hamilton
- Wanda Hendrix
- Clark Howat
- Anthony Jochim
- Adam Kennedy
- Douglas Kennedy
- Brett King
- Robert Knapp
- Ted Knight
- Joel Lawrence
- Dayton Lummis
- Gavin MacLeod
- Tyler McVey
- Joyce Meadows
- Mary Tyler Moore
- Leonard Nimoy
- Hal Jon Norman
- Stefanie Powers
- Sherwood Price
- Mike Ragan
- Richard Reeves
- Jack Reitzen
- Johnny Seven
- Harry Dean Stanton
- Lyle Talbot
- Robert Tetrick
- Carol Thurston
- Brad Trumbull
- John Vivyan
- Helen Walker
- Patrick Waltz
- Alan Wells

== Production notes ==
Ziv Television Programs, Inc., of Cincinnati, Ohio, a producer and distributor of more than 40 television shows during the 1950s including Highway Patrol, Sea Hunt, Science Fiction Theatre, and subsequently, ZIV-United Artists produced the television series. Later, Showcase Media of Studio City, California distributed the series.

== Home media ==
ClassicFlix announced that they would release Season 1 on DVD in region 1 in 2017. However, these plans were shelved indefinitely on April 17, 2018, when ClassicFlix announced that they wouldn't be moving on with the project after all, due to the film elements not being in good enough shape. In November 2024, Classic Flix has revived plans to release Lock Up in 2025, upon learning that there are 16mm prints in good shape for remastering.
