= Hollywood Man =

1976 film by Jack Starrett

- Directed by: Jack Starrett
- Written by: Tom Farese; Ray Girardin; Dominic Gombardella; William Smith
- Produced by: William Smith
- Starring: William Smith; Ray Girardin; Jude Farese; Jennifer Billingsley; Mary Woronov; Michael Delano; Tom Simcox; Don Stroud
- Cinematography: Robert C. Jessup
- Edited by: Arthur Anthony; John C. Horger
- Music by: D'Arneill Pershing
- Distributed by: Intercontinental Releasing Corporation
- Release date: 1976
- Running time: 93 minutes (Finland, uncut); 87 minutes (Finland, cut); 107 minutes (USA)
- Country: United States
- Languages: English, Spanish

Hollywood Man (released in the UK as Death Threat) is a 1976 American film directed by Jack Starrett. The film was featured in the 1997 Quentin Tarantino Film Festival.

== Plot ==
Cash-strapped actor/director Rafe Stoker reluctantly agrees to put up almost all of his personal fortune as collateral to shady investors to complete production on his action film. In turn, they hire Harvey, an unstable biker, to sabotage the production so that they can collect on Stoker's pledge. Harvey and his gang engage in escalating acts of violence against Stoker's film crew and other random people, while Stoker desperately attempts to complete his film shoot amid other production delays. After completing the movie, Stoker and his girlfriend Julie are gunned down by thugs hired by his backers.

== Cast ==
- William Smith as Rafe Stoker
- Ray Girardin as Harvey
- Jude Farese as Rhodes
- Jennifer Billingsley as "Buttons"
- Mary Woronov as Julie (credited as "Mary Waronov")
- Michael Delano as J.J.
- Tom Simcox as The Sheriff
- Don Stroud as Barney
- Carmine Caridi as Anthony
- Angelo Farese as Angelo
- John Alderman as Jesus
- Wayde Preston as "Tex"
- David Pritchard as Dennis
- Stefanie Auerbach as Audrey
- Art Hern as The Hollywood Producer
- Byron Mabe as John
- Clay Tanner as Dave
- Shelly Babcock as The Nurse
- Michelle Marley as The Lady In The Hospital
- Eddie Duncan as The Boy In The Hospital
- Stafford Morgan as Bill
- Billy Rose as The Bartender
- Peter Mengrone as Hit Man
- Don Sebastian as Hit Man
- Beau Gibson as The Hollywood Stuntman
- Bud Davis as The Hollywood Stuntman
- Charles Pitts as Newlywed
- Reggi Lynn as Newlywed
- Don Banashek as Boy In The Van
- Cheryl Dunn as Waitress
- John De Troia as The Stillman
- Gary Littlejohn as Biker

== Soundtrack ==
- Tony Chance - "Hollywood Man" (Music and Lyrics by Arnold Capitanelli)
