= The Dirt Gang =

- Theatrical release poster
- Directed by: Jerry Jameson
- Written by: Michael DeForrest (uncredited); Michael C. Healy
- Produced by: Joseph E. Bishop; Paul Carr; Arthur A. Jacobs; Ronald Jacobs; Roger Corman
- Starring: Paul Carr; Michael Pataki; Lee de Broux; Jon Shank; Nancy Harris; T.J. Escott; Jessica Stuart
- Cinematography: Howard A. Anderson
- Edited by: Byron 'Buzz' Brandt
- Production companies: Building "G" Productions, Inc.
- Distributed by: American International Pictures
- Release date: November 1972
- Running time: 89 minutes
- Country: United States
- Language: English

The Dirt Gang is a 1972 American action drama film directed by Jerry Jameson and starring Paul Carr, Michael Forest, Michael Pataki, Lee de Broux, Nanci Beck, Jon Shank, Nancy Harris, T.J. Escott, and Jessica Stuart. The film was released by American International Pictures in November 1972.

== Plot ==
The Dirt Gang is the last of six biker movies made by American International. It is a fascinating and compelling mixture of genres. It is a Biker/Western/Revenge Tragedy with smatterings of Sexploitation. Like all good Revenge Tragedies it has forebodings, prophecies and portents of doom throughout as the characters head towards their inevitable destinies.

The movie starts with a gas station robbery going wrong which Monk blames on Biff - a young biker who was supposed to be with them as their lucky charm. Monk says "Dammit! I wish that Biff was here we wouldn't have any trouble at all." Jesse says "You on that crazy kick about that kid bringing you luck?" Monk replies "That's no kick it's true." They ride away from the gas station leaving Willy behind who gets shot by the policeman.

Monk and the two remaining bikers flee in to the desert pursued by a policeman. They fool him in to leaving his car and callously knock him down with a bike before running over and killing him (as depicted in the film poster). Putting the body in the police car they torch it and drive off as it burns.

They arrive where the rest of the Dirt Gang are. The Padre, Biff, Stormy and Big Beth are relaxing together with Stormy, Biff and Big Beth entwined together in free love. The Padre gives an ominous prophecy of what is to come between Monk and Zeno. He says "Bless you my children. The time of Armageddon draws near. The great war between good and evil shall someday come to pass." Stormy asks: "What about us?" Padre: "We shall survive because we are righteous."

Monk arrives and physically attacks Biff for not being with him when he should have been. He blames Biff for what happened to Willy. After watching this Stormy says to Big Beth "Something else is going to happen. I'm afraid Beth." Beth asks "Like what?" Stormy replies "We're doomed."

Monk is looking at his poster of Zeno, who had taken part in a bike duel with him causing him to lose an eye, and talking about his obsession with finding him for a rematch. He has been searching for him all over America and will never rest until he finds him. Biff tries to talk him out of it but to no avail.

Monk leads the Dirt Gang towards Mexico and freedom from police pursuit but they come across a film company shooting a Western. When the Dirt Gang arrive at the top of the hill looking down at the movie set they are keen to go down. Stormy ominously tries to stop them. She says "We've got to go on to Mexico. We shouldn't fool around here." Big Beth adds "Stormy says the charts are all wrong for us today." But Monk ignores her and rides down to his fate.

At first the Dirt Gang are in playful spirits and offer to ride away after they are fed. They go in to the food tent and start eating and laughing while the film company continue to make their movie. Zeno warns them to call the police but they refuse to listen to him.

Mary, Zeno's girlfriend is called to the tent by Beth and humiliated to much laughter from the gang. A little later Zeno goes to get a coffee and stands staring at Monk. The atmosphere changes and the laughter stops. The Dirt Gang is silent and does not know how to react to this stranger. Monk recognises him and the two size each other up like gun fighters. Zeno says "I'm a peace loving man" and walks away. Monk follows him and the two talk. Zeno says, in Western tradition, "I hear you've been looking for me." He then says "There's nothing here for you." Monk replies "Oh you're wrong baby. Everything is here for me now."

From this moment on his obsession takes over and he is like a man possessed in his desperation to Death Duel with Zeno. Stormy, realising what is happening, tries to save the man she loves but to no avail. She tries to sweet talk him and tempt him in to leaving with her for pleasure but he angrily rejects her. He pushes her away and orders her never to touch or tempt him again. His obsession has taken over and nothing will stand in its way. Beth comforts Stormy saying "You shouldn't have done that Stormy." Stormy replies prophetically "He thinks he's some kind of King or something. Look at him. He's on a suicide trip."

The Padre also refers to Monk as being a King in the later tent party scene "In the beginning there was a King and the King was called Monk and Monk was a cool King." Monk was more than just their leader. He was their ruler and they were his willing subjects unable to see that he is leading them down a destructive path through his obsession with Zeno.

Zeno is very much like Shane who has put away his gun and refuses to use it again. Monk, on the other hand, is like Captain Ahab who sees Zeno as his Moby Dick who caused him to lose an eye. It becomes a battle of wills between them with Monk determined to find a way to make Zeno duel him. The losers will be all those around them between that moment and the inevitable duel. Monk and Zeno stand at the centre of an increasingly devastating storm.

After causing a lot of trouble for the film crew, which Zeno sits and passively watches, Monk says to him prophetically "You could save all these people a lot of damn trouble, you know that. You and me just settle it on bikes. Ah, what's it gonna take? I guess we're just gonna wait and see won't we."

The next scene reveals Zeno's Achilles Heel as Snake tries to molest Mary in the trailer. Zeno rescues her and they flee in to the desert in a Dune Buggy only to be recaptured after a high speed chase. From that point on Mary is defiantly by Zeno's side. She is a woman experiencing something new and frightening in her life but has hidden depths of strength. When Monk points the shotgun down at Zeno Mary does not flinch but stares defiantly up silently warning him not to pull the trigger.

From this moment on Monk has an admiration and respect for Mary. When they all hide from the police car it is he who personally guards her. While the rest of the film crew are forced to 'party' with the bikers he allows Mary to sit with Zeno which saves her from being involved in the orgy which follows. It is this freedom he allows her which enables her to untie Zeno and help him to escape. She then stays behind, putting herself in danger, to cover for his escape.

When Monk discovers that Zeno is missing he sees Mary sitting by herself and realises what has happened. Rather than physically threaten her, as he had previously done to Stormy, he threatens one of the film crew with a knife who consequently betrays Mary. Monk stares at her and then punches the betrayer to the ground for "being a snitch!" He turns to Mary saying that he will deal with her later but leaves her free while he goes after Zeno.

Zeno is captured in the desert and dragged back to the film set on his back with his legs tied to a bike. He is tied to a railing. Monk realises that Mary is his weakness as she fearlessly tries running to him. On the spur of the moment his obsession overrides all else and he allows Snake to start to molest her in front of Zeno. Mary fights back but Snake pulls out a knife and starts to cut away at her clothes. Throughout this Monk is watching both Mary and Zeno's reaction. His face is a mixture of emotions as he constantly looks at Zeno with his good eye hoping that Zeno will stop this molestation. He is waiting for Zeno' decency and feelings for Mary to force him to duel.

This scene is a marked contrast to the earlier scene where Big Beth and the gang humiliate and laugh at Mary. Here they stand silently watching. The only things to be heard are the night crickets and Mary's screams as she defiantly fights back. Not only has she gained Monk's respect but the respect of the rest of the gang who now hate what is happening to her but are unable to stop it.

It is also a marked contrast to the earlier scene in the trailer where Snake tries to molest her and Mary reacts like a rabbit frozen in headlights. Here she fights back until the knife is pulled but even then she is defiant with her body language and screams. She has grown and changed throughout the course of the movie and in doing so has changed those around her.

To save Mary Zeno agrees to the Death Duel much to Monk's delight. He steps forward and gently stops Snake from molesting Mary. Mary, though, is still defiant. As Snake reluctantly releases her she spits in his face twice. Jesse steps forward to physically disarm Snake and allow Mary to escape. He and Snake curl up crying on the street.

Monk has his duel but at what cost? The film crew and Dirt Gang have all been irrevocably changed and broken by events. Their carefree days of abandon and free living are gone.

The next morning Monk and Zeno face each other at opposite ends of the street like gunfighters on bikes. Biff stands with Monk getting him ready like his Squire. Monk is confident because Biff is his lucky charm and so therefore he thinks he cannot lose. His obsession and faith in Biff makes him overconfident and this leads to his downfall. Biff, on the other hand, is full of foreboding when he stands with the other bikers. He is unexpectedly nervous and dreads what Zeno is capable of doing.

The Death Duel begins and the two bikers try to defeat each other as they constantly race towards to each other like knights in a medieval joust. Monk's obsession drives him on and he is determined to kill his opponent and gain revenge for the loss of his eye. This gives him the edge. They both come off their bikes and fight on foot along the boardwalk smashing windows with their helmets. Zeno is forced thrown to the ground on the street carrying an Indian spear with him.

This is where the Captain Ahab symbolism is most evident. Ahab went to his doom having harpooned Moby Dick and then becoming accidentally entangled with it and dragged to his death. Monk is killed in a similar way. After remounting his bike he is harpooned by the spear as he obsessively charges at Zeno. The same obsession drove each man to die at the hand of their nemesis through a harpoon.

Zeno takes no pleasure in what he has done and leaves arm in arm with Mary. Biff, Stormy and the rest of the Dirt Gang stare on at their dead leader with disbelief and grief as the camera slowly pulls away. The prophecies and portents of this Revenge Tragedy have come true. Their carefree days as a biker gang are over as Monk was the King, now fallen on the field of battle, who held them together.

== Cast ==
- Paul Carr as Monk
- Michael Pataki as Snake
- Lee de Broux as Jesse
- Jon Shank as Padre
- Nancy Harris as Big Beth
- T.J. Escott as Biff
- Jessica Stuart as Stormy
- Tom Anders as Marty
- Joe Mosca as Villie
- Michael Forest as Zeno
- Jo Anne Meredith as Dawn Christian
- Nanci Beck as Mary
- Charles Macaulay as Curt
- Hal England as Sidney
- Ben Archibek as Jason
- William 'Billy' Benedict as Station Attendant
- Uschi Digard as Nude Gang Member with Blue Jeans at Orgy (uncredited)
