= Lee de Broux =

American actor (born 1941)

- Born: May 7, 1941 (age 85); La Mesa, California, U.S.
- Occupation: Actor
- Years active: 1969-present

Lee de Broux (born May 7, 1941) is an American character actor of film and television who is best known for his roles in such films and television series as Chinatown, RoboCop, The Gun, Geronimo: An American Legend, Norma Rae, Cannon and Gunsmoke.

== Filmography ==
- Run, Angel, Run! (1969) - Pappy
- Tell Them Willie Boy Is Here (1969) - 'Meathead'
- The Virginian (1969) - Jack (Season 7, Episode 18 "The Price of Love")
- Sometimes a Great Notion (1970) - Willard Eggleston
- Wild Rovers (1971) - 'Leaky'
- Evel Knievel (1971) - Wrangler #1
- The Dirt Gang (1972) - Jesse
- Coffy (1973) - Nick
- The Outfit (1973) - Walter Kinney (uncredited)
- The Nickel Ride (1974) - Harry
- The Terminal Man (1974) - Reporter
- Chinatown (1974) - Policeman #2
- The Gun (1974) Pawn Shop Owner
- The Klansman (1974) - Reverend Alverson
- Hawmps! (1976) - Fitzgerald
- The Incredible Hulk (1978-1982) - Mike Evans / Leo
- Norma Rae (1979) - Lujan
- Back Roads (1981) - 'Red'
- Frances (1982) - 'Flowing Gold' Director
- Voyager from the Unknown (1982) - Haggerty
- Hunter's Blood (1986) - 'Red Beard'
- Ratboy (1986) - Catullus Cop
- RoboCop (1987) - Salvator "Sal" Luccione
- Above the Law (1988) - CIA Interrogator
- Pumpkinhead (1988) - Tom Harley
- Young Guns II (1990) - Bounty Hunter
- Hangfire (1991) - Kuttner
- Diplomatic Immunity (1991) - McManus
- Conflict of Interest (1993) - Ray Dureen
- Geronimo: An American Legend (1993) - City Marshal Joe Hawkins
- Steal Big Steal Little (1995) - INS Official
- Wild Bill (1995) - Carl Mann
- Mars (1997) - Sheriff Bascom
- Most Wanted (1997) - Commander Goldstein
- The Last Letter (2004) - Mr. Brannigan
- The Metrosexual (2007) - Mr. Dawson
- Magic (2010) - Park & Ride Security Guard
- Killer by Nature (2010) - Medical Examiner
- 10 Years (2010) - Sheriff Hoss
- Kids vs Monsters (2015) - Norman
- Senior Love Triangle (2019) - Hank
