= Joel Lawrence =

American film and television actor

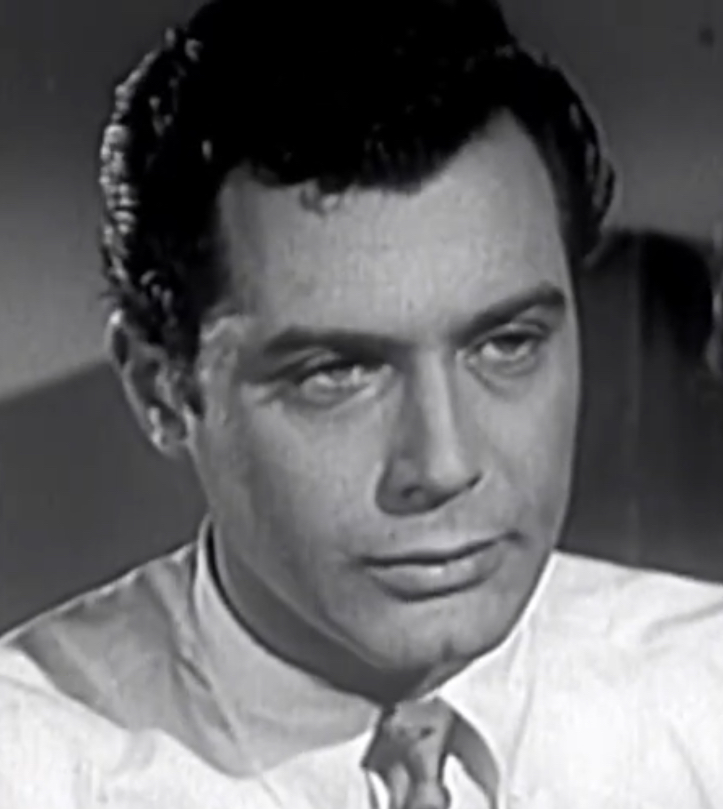
- Lawrence in Lock-Up, 1960
- Born: Joel Herbert List; November 23, 1932; The Bronx, New York, U.S.
- Died: May 23, 1999 (aged 66); Los Angeles, California, U.S.
- Occupations: Film and television actor

Joel Herbert List (November 23, 1932 – May 23, 1999) was an American film and television actor.

== Life and career ==
Lawrence was born in The Bronx, New York. He served in the United States Army during the Korean War. During his military service, he entertained troops with the comedy group The Lawrence Brothers. He began his screen career in 1959, starring as Rob Wilson, a race car driver in the film Roadracers. In the same year, he made his television debut in the syndicated crime drama television series Highway Patrol. He also appeared in the syndicated crime drama television series Lock-Up.

Later in his career, Lawrence guest-starred in television programs including 77 Sunset Strip, Mission: Impossible, Honey West, The Rockford Files, Dallas, Barnaby Jones, The Streets of San Francisco and The Paul Lynde Show. He also appeared in films such as Welcome Home, Soldier Boys, The Carpetbaggers and Parts: The Clonus Horror.

Lawrence retired from acting in 1986, last appearing in the NBC anthology television series Amazing Stories.

== Death ==
Lawrence died from complications of diabetes in Los Angeles, California on May 23, 1999, at the age of 66.
