= Florence MacMichael =

American character actress

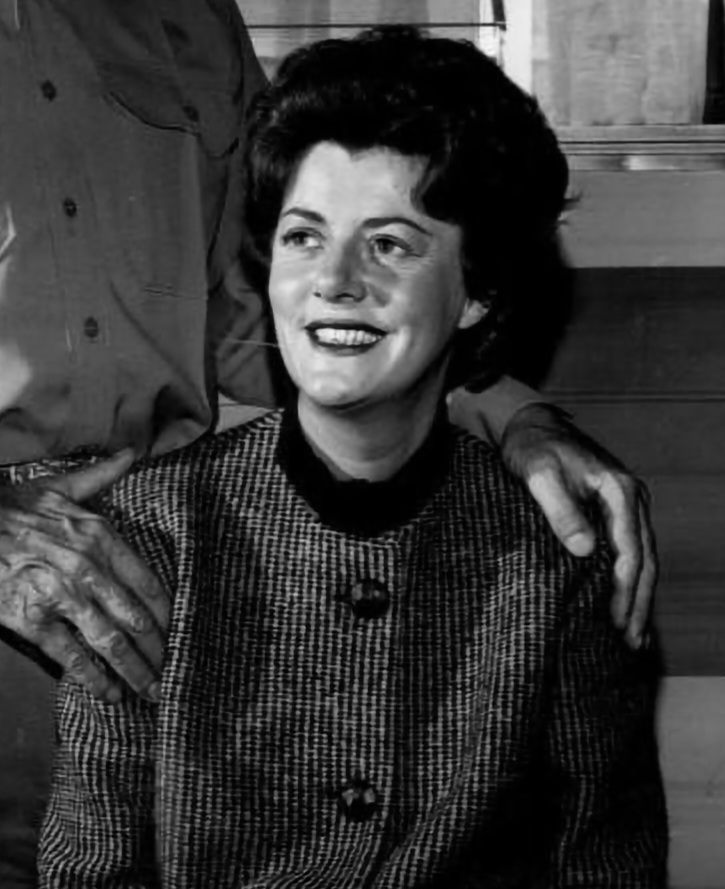
- MacMichael in Mister Ed (1963)
- Born: April 26, 1919; Hagerstown, Maryland, U.S.
- Died: May 28, 1999 (aged 80); Cambria, San Luis Obispo County, California, U.S.
- Occupation: Actress
- Spouse(s): Sebryn Myers (19??–1992; his death); James McCoy
- Children: 2

Florence MacMichael (April 26, 1919 – May 28, 1999) was an American character actress of stage, film and television, best known for playing Winnie Kirkwood in the television series Mister Ed.

== Early life and education ==
MacMichael was born on April 26, 1919, in Hagerstown, Maryland, to Mary Adele (née Wahl) and Roy Alexander MacMichael Sr. He taught at the Hagerstown School of Music. Her mother performed with the Potomac Playmakers. Her brother played guitar as a member of The Imperials.

MacMichael belonged to the Dramatic Club at Hagerstown High School, from which she graduated in 1938. She portrayed the heroine in the group's first production in January 1938. She graduated from the American Academy of Dramatic Arts in New York City in June 1940.

== Career ==
MacMichael began her entertainment career on local radio and theatre and later on Broadway. Her performance as Muriel, "vapid little deb who causes heaps of trouble", in Out of the Frying Pan with the Hilltop Theatre in Ellicott City, Maryland, resulted in her going to Broadway with the show when it premiered in February 1941. That performance led to her first film role in its 1943 adaptation, Young and Willing. Some of her subsequent film credits include Woman Obsessed (1959), The Horse in the Gray Flannel Suit (1968) and Welcome Home, Soldier Boys (1972).

On television MacMichael was cast in a recurring role as Florence Pearson in the sitcom My Three Sons (1960–1961), as Winnie Kirkwood in Mister Ed (1963–1965), and as Barney Fife's girlfriend in two episodes of The Andy Griffith Show. She also performed in several episodes of Alfred Hitchcock Presents, on The Twilight Zone episode "Mr. Bevis", on the Western series The Tall Man in "Millionaire MacBean", as well as on other television series such Bachelor Father, Dennis the Menace, The Donna Reed Show, and Alcoa Premiere.

MacMichael was active in local theater as both an actress and director. She was the founder of the Sierra Madre Studio Players and worked too at the Pasadena Playhouse. By the late 1970s, she began teaching stage acting at the Pasadena Repertory Theatre inside The Hotel Carver. One of her more notable exercises in instructing method acting was to have her students perform like a slice of bacon frying on a hot skillet.

== Personal life ==
MacMichael was married twice, first to Sebryn Myers (another source says Sellwyn Myers, married in February 1944 on Long Island) and then to James McCoy. She had two children, a son and a daughter (both with Myers). In 1999, at age 80, she died in Cambria in San Luis Obispo County, California.

== Filmography ==
Year	Title	Role	Notes
1943	Young and Willing	Muriel Foster	
1959	Woman Obsessed	Mrs. Bedelia Gibbs	
1960	Let's Make Love	Receptionist	Uncredited
1961	Alfred Hitchcock Presents	Mrs. Simmons	Season 6 Episode 21: "The Kiss-Off"
1961	Alfred Hitchcock Presents	Mrs. Hackett	Season 6 Episode 33: "A Secret Life"
1961	The Children's Hour	Minor Role	Uncredited
1962	Alfred Hitchcock Presents	Alice	Season 7 Episode 27: "Act of Faith"
1962	The Alfred Hitchcock Hour	Daisy	Season 1 Episode 7: "Annabel"
1968	The Horse in the Gray Flannel Suit	Catherine	
1971	Welcome Home, Soldier Boys	Danny's Mother	(final film role)
