= Paul Carr (actor) =

American actor (1934–2006)

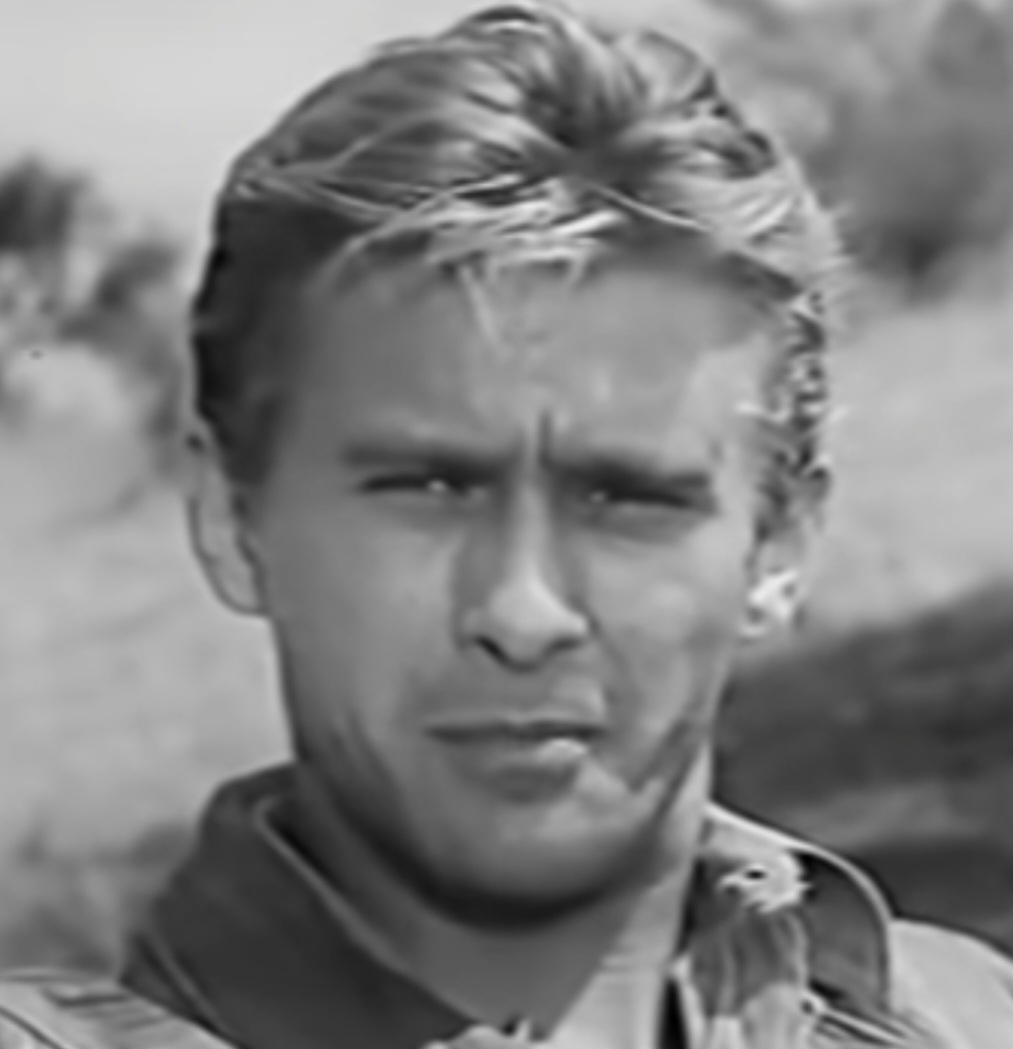
- Carr in an episode of One Step Beyond (1959)
- Born: January 31, 1934; Marrero, Louisiana, U.S.
- Died: February 17, 2006 (aged 72); Los Angeles, California, U.S.
- Occupations: Actor; director; writer; producer
- Spouse: Meryl (6 May 1979–2006; his death)
- Children: 3

Paul Wallace Carr (January 31, 1934 – February 17, 2006) was an American actor, director, writer, and producer who performed on stage, film, and television for half a century.

== Early life ==
As a teenager, Carr had an interest in both music and acting. Following some acting locally, he moved to New York and studied acting at the American Theatre Wing.

== Career ==
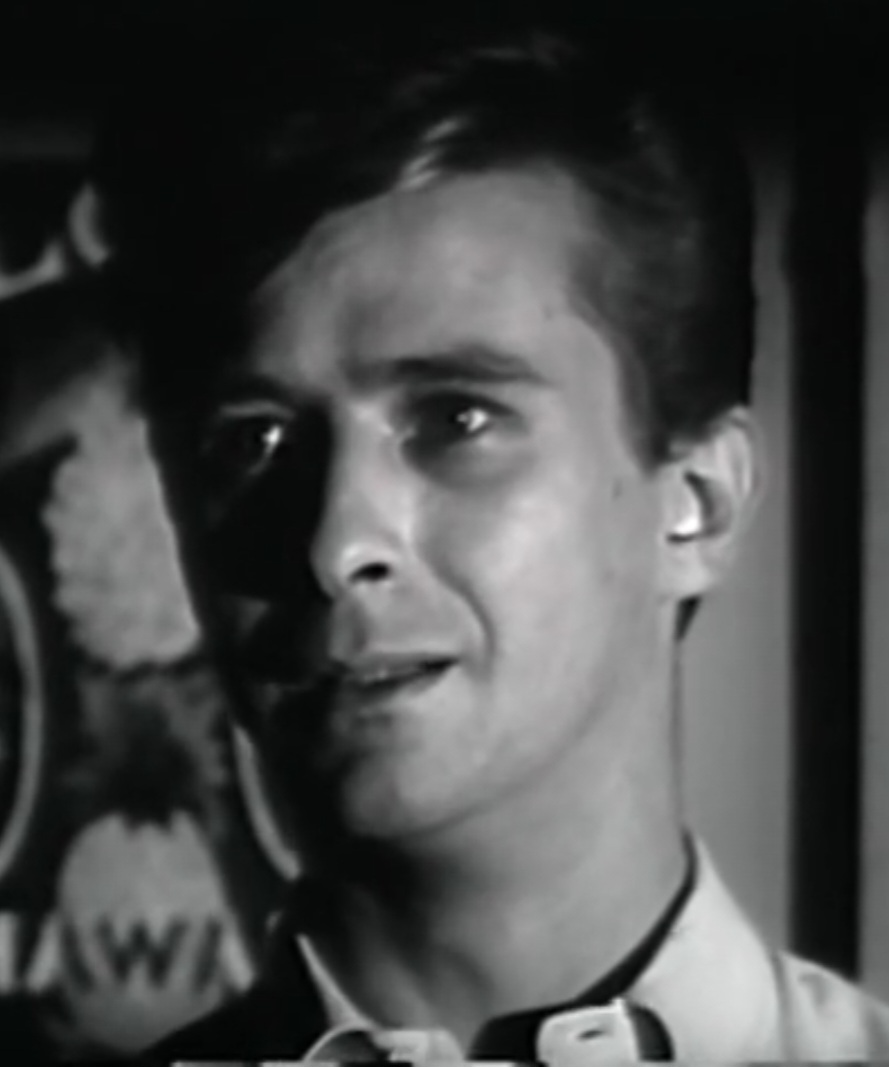
Carr in an episode of Lock-Up (1960)

After a short stint in the United States Marine Corps during his late teens, Carr launched his acting career with a role in a New Orleans production of Herman Melville's Billy Budd. By the middle 1950s, he was working on live television in New York City, including appearances on the popular Studio One and Kraft Television Theater, while continuing theatrical work in stock companies in Ohio and Michigan, including roles such as Peter Quilpe in The Cocktail Party, Haemon in Antigone, Jack in Tennessee Williams' The Rose Tattoo, and Hal Carter in William Inge's Picnic. He toured in summer stock with Chico Marx in Fifth Season.

Carr made his film debut in 1955 with a small uncredited role in Alfred Hitchcock's thriller The Wrong Man. That same year, he portrayed a prisoner of war in the New York Theatre Guild production of Time Limit on Broadway. His film career continued with a much larger role in Alfred Werker's The Young Don't Cry in 1957 starring James Whitmore and Sal Mineo; and that same year he appeared in the Warner Bros. rock and roll jukebox movie Jamboree as Pete Porter.

He worked steadily on television in the late 1950s and early 1960s with guest spots and supporting roles in many western series such as three appearances on Laramie, Trackdown, four appearances on Rawhide, Lawman, The Rifleman, Gunsmoke, The Tall Man, The Travels of Jaimie McPheeters, and The Virginian. He also appeared in many dramas. One such appearance was in 1964 when he played folk singer and defendant Con Bolton in the Perry Mason episode "The Case of the Tandem Target". He also appeared on 77 Sunset Strip, Straightaway, The Everglades, Dr. Kildare, Going My Way, Adam-12, Hawaii Five-O, The Fugitive, Twelve O'Clock High, and The Silent Force, interspersed with occasional film work, including Captain Newman, M.D.. Other television appearances were on One Step Beyond, Burke's Law, Combat!, The Time Tunnel, Land of the Giants, Star Trek, and The Invaders.

In 1965, Carr acted in the role of Bill Horton, the physician son of protagonist Dr. Tom Horton on Days of Our Lives in its first season. He was later a regular on General Hospital and The Doctors where he played Dr. Paul Summers. Carr went on to work in many of other television shows in the intervening years, including Get Smart, Mannix, The Rockford Files, Police Story and Murphy Brown. He may be remembered best, however, for his various appearances on science fiction shows over the years. In 1964/1965, he had the recurring role of uptight crewman Casey Clark on Voyage to the Bottom of the Sea.

In 1965, Carr played Lt. Lee Kelso, the USS Enterprise helmsman in the second Star Trek pilot episode, "Where No Man Has Gone Before". The episode finally aired, out of sequence in terms of new episodes produced, early in the first season of Star Trek in the autumn of 1966. Carr would later use the name Lee Kelso as a pseudonym for his voice performances in the English-language versions of the anime shows Cowboy Bebop and Trigun.

In 1981, he joined the cast of Buck Rogers in the 25th Century as 'Lt. Devlin', one of the officers on the Earth Starship Searcher.

Throughout his career, Carr's first love was the stage. He appeared in nearly 100 stage productions on Broadway, off-Broadway and off-off-Broadway, as well as touring companies, stock, and in regional theaters around the United States. He received the LA Weekly Theater Award for Best Actor in the Theatre East production of Manhattan Express in 1987 and garnered a 1995 Dramalogue Award for his role in the Los Angeles Repertory production of Assassins. Carr was also a writer and director, and headed the Play Committee of the L.A. Repertory Company.

== Death ==
Carr died of lung cancer in Los Angeles on February 17, 2006. He was 72.

== Selected filmography ==
- The Wrong Man (1956) as Young Man (uncredited)
- The Young Don't Cry (1957) as Tom Bradley
- Jamboree (1957) as Pete Porter
- One Step Beyond (1959), episode "Reunion" as Peter
- The Rifleman (1959-1960) as Derek Hanaway & Garth Healey & Doug Carter & Fred Harris
- Bonanza (1960), episode "Death at Dawn" as McNeil
- Gunsmoke (1961-1965) as Cully Tate & Jud Gibbijohn
- Posse from Hell (1961) as Jock Wiley
- Rawhide (1961) – Jason Adams in S3:E12, "Incident at the Top of the World"
- General Hospital (1963) as Dr. Peter Taylor No. 1 (1969) / Milton Stanus (1994)
- Captain Newman, M.D. (1963) as Arthur Werbel
- Days of Our Lives as Bill Horton (1965–66)
- Combat! (1966) as Kleinschmidt in two-part episode "Hills Are for Heroes"
- Star Trek: The Original Series (1966) – Lt. Lee Kelso in S1:E3, "Where No Man Has Gone Before"
- 1966

The Virginian (TV): season 05 episode 16: (Sue Ann) : Joe Stevens

- In Cold Blood (1967) as Flo's Lover (uncredited)
- The Green Hornet (1967) as Eddie Carter
- The Invaders (1967) as Billy Stear
- Adam-12 (1968) as Mr. Whitley Season 1 Episode 6 "And You Want Me to Get Married!"
- Adam-12 (1968) as Prof. Ray Pinter Season 1 Episode 20 "I'm Still a Cop"
- The Virginian (1968) season 6 episode 11 (To bear witness) : Pete Varig
- The Virginian (1969) season 7 episode 26 (The stranger) : Hodges
- The Silent Force (1970, in episode "The Judge") as Dr. Morris
- Columbo: Ransom for a Dead Man (1971) as Hammond
- Brute Corps (1971) as Ross
- Trampa mortal (1972)
- Ben (1972) as Kelly
- A Man for Hanging (1972) as Shep Barrenger
- The Dirt Gang (1972) as Monk and associate producer
- The Severed Arm (1973) as Sgt. Mark Richards
- Executive Action (1973) as Gunman (Chris) - Team A
- The Bat People (1974) as Dr. Kipling
- Truck Stop Women (1974) as Seago
- Adventures of the Queen (1975) as Walter Fletcher
- The Six Million Dollar Man as Timberlake / Reverend Essex / Police Officer Paul Cord
- The Rockford Files (1975) episode "The Four Pound Brick" as Police Sgt. Andy Wilson
- The Bionic Woman (1975) as Timberlake
- The Deadly Tower (1975) as Officer C.T. Foss
- The Lives of Jenny Dolan (1975) as Eddie Owens
- Sisters of Death (1976) as Mark
- The Doctors (1976) as Dr. Paul Summers
- The Rockford Files (1978) episode "Empty Frame" as Jeff Levane
- Greatest Heroes of the Bible (1979) as Belzar
- Scruples (1980) as Pat O'Byrnne
- Raise the Titanic! (1980) as CIA Director Nicholson
- The Incredible Hulk (1980) as Alan Grable
- Buck Rogers in the 25th Century (1981) as Lt. Devlin
- Airwolf (1984 Season 1 : Ep. 6) as Simon Sayes
- Akira (1988) as man on Nezu's Phone (2001 Pioneer dub) (English version)
- Under the Boardwalk (1989) as Track
- Generations (1989) as Alex Hawkins
- Eat a Bowl of Tea (1989) as Fry Cook
- Night Eyes (1990) as Tom Michaelson
- Solar Crisis (1990) as IXL executive #2
- Dangerous Women as Ben Cronin
- Father & Son: Dangerous Relations (1993)
- Scorned (1994) as Kramer
- Cowboy Bebop as Van; Pao Puzi (credited as Lee Kelso)
- Blood: The Last Vampire (2000) as School Headmaster (voice)
- Spotlight on Paul Carr (2002) as himself
- Ghost in the Shell: Stand Alone Complex as Matsuoka (English version, voice)
