= Harold Daniels =

American actor and director

Harold Daniels was an actor and then a director of American films. He directed about 14 films.

The 1958 Terror in the Haunted House he directed was one of the first to use the technique known as Psychorama.

Daniels was born Harold Goldstein in Pittsburgh. His brother, Sam, was a makeup artist for RKO Pictures.

== Filmography ==
=== Director ===
- They Met in Argentina (1941), assistant director
- The Greatest Gift (1942), short film
- The Woman from Tangier (1948)
- The Lawton Story (1948), co-director
- Daughter of the West (1949)
- Roadblock (1951)
- Sword of Venus (1953)
- Port Sinister (1953)
- Bayou (1957)
- Terror in the Haunted House (1958)
- Date with Death (1959)
- The Phantom (1961)
- Ten Girls Ago (1962)
- House of the Black Death (1965), one of the directors
- Diabolic Wedding (1971), one of the directors

=== Actor ===
- Trail Dust (1936)
- Hollywood Cowboy (1937)
- Doomed at Sundown (1937)
- Oklahoma Renegades (1940)
- Secrets of a Model (1940)
