= Psychorama =

Psychorama, also called the precon process, is the act of communicating subliminal information through film by flashing images on the screen so quickly that they cannot be perceived by the conscious mind. It is a subset of subliminal messaging that is applied only through non-verbal messages in film. The name most commonly refers to a "gimmick" in commercial movie production (sometimes using the marketing phrase "filmed in psychorama" as a play on the more common "filmed in Technicolor").

== History ==
In 1958, the film My World Dies Screaming (later retitled Terror in the Haunted House) marked Hollywood's first attempt to make use of this technique. At different points in this film, a skull is flashed to inspire terror, a snake to inspire hate, two hearts to inspire love, and large letters spelling out "blood" to create fear. It was produced by William Edwards, written by Robert C. Dennis, and directed by Harold Daniels. It starred Gerald Mohr and Cathy O'Donnell. Makeup was handled by Harry Thomas, who worked on a number of Ed Wood films in the 1950s. The plot concerned a woman who is brought by her husband to live in an old house that she saw many times before in her nightmares, and she desperately tries to get him to leave the house before something terrible happens. This technique was called an example of the "pure hype and hucksterism" surrounding subliminal messaging in the 1950s.

The following year, 1959, saw another film produced using this same format, titled A Date with Death. This film also starred Gerald Mohr, coincidentally.

The technique of psychorama has also been featured in later films, including The Exorcist and Fight Club. In the latter film, Tyler Durden splices images of pornography into family movies that play at the movie theater he works at as a part-time projectionist.

The band Evanescence used this technique in their Sweet Sacrifice music video. In it, images of bones, skulls, houses, fires, and videos of the band performing are flashed at various intervals. Evanescence also utilized samples from "My World Dies Screaming" in some versions of their song "Understanding", the demo of "Whisper" and the introduction to the album Origin.

The TV show Babylon 5 featured an in-universe reference to supposed psychorama (the words "Trust the Corps" and "The Corps is Your Friend" appear on screen for four frames), although it is debatable whether intentional in-universe references are true psychorama.

The name "psychorama" has also been used as the title of a film festival for the psycho film genre.
