= Clay Tanner =

American actor (1931–2002)

- Clay Tanner in Kung Fu, 1973
- Born: Allen Honaker; February 3, 1931
- Died: December 22, 2002 (aged 71)

Clay Tanner (February 3, 1931, in Clay City, Indiana, US, as Allen Honaker – December 22, 2002, in Hernando, Florida, US) was an American actor. He began his career with roles in various TV productions such as Bonanza, The Fugitive, Get Smart, Perry Mason, McHale's Navy, The Outer Limits, The Virginian, and Stoney Burke. Tanner also played the role of Satan in the rape scene of Rosemary's Baby.

== Partial filmography ==
- 1963 Stoney Burke (TV) as Russ
- 1963 The Nutty Professor as Man (uncredited)
- 1963 A Gathering of Eagles as Patient (uncredited)
- 1963 The Outer Limits (TV) as Second Hunter
- 1963 Alexander the Great (TV movie) as The Four Guardsmen
- 1964–1965 Broadside (TV) as The Marine / The Chief / The Marine Sergeant
- 1965 McHale's Navy Joins the Air Force as Lieutenant Wilson
- 1965 Perry Mason as Officer
- 1966 Get Smart (TV) as KAOS Agent #3
- 1962–1966 McHale's Navy as The 1st MP / The Marine Guard / The 2nd Marine / The Guard
- 1966 Seconds as Father (uncredited)
- 1964–1966 The Virginian (TV) as Station Agent / Frank / Baggage Man / Station Master / Freight Agent
- 1964–1967 The Fugitive (TV) - Policeman Landers / Deputy / 2nd Officer
- 1967 Laredo (TV) as Abe
- 1967 The Big Valley (TV) as Tanner
- 1966–1967 Bonanza (TV) as DeWitt / "Tex" / Wiggins / Herb (six episodes)
- 1968 Rosemary's Baby as The Devil (uncredited)
- 1968 The Shakiest Gun in the West as Deputy (uncredited)
- 1969 Hello, Dolly! as Laborer (uncredited)
- 1970 The High Chaparral (TV) as Jesse
- 1970 Night Chase (TV movie)
- 1971 How to Frame a Figg as Motorcycle Officer
- 1972 Lady Sings the Blues as The Detective #2
- 1972 Hawaii Five-O episode: "Journey out of Limbo" as Stark
- 1973 Cleopatra Jones as Cop in "Bust" (uncredited)
- 1974 She Lives! (TV movie) as Police Officer
- 1974 The Gravy Train as Bather
- 1973–1974 Kung Fu (TV) as Sheriff Talley / Deputy Ty / Barr
- 1975 Race with the Devil as Delbert
- 1974–1975 Harry O (TV) as Deputy / Leon, the Bartender / Marshall Coffey
- 1976 Cannon (TV) as Captain Middleman
- 1976 W.C. Fields and Me as Assistant Director (uncredited)
- 1976 Zebra Force as Lieutenant Claymore
- 1976 The Outlaw Josey Wales as First Texas Ranger
- 1976 A Small Town in Texas as Junior
- 1976 Drum as Mr. Holcomb
- 1976 Hollywood Man as Dave
- 1976–1977 Starsky and Hutch (TV) as Fields / Conrad
- 1977 Nowhere to Hide (TV movie) as Lee
- 1977 Final Chapter: Walking Tall as O.Q. Teal
- 1978 Thaddeus Rose and Eddie (TV movie) as Singer
- 1978 Big Bob Johnson and His Fantastic Speed Circus as Earl
- 1979 Mr. Horn (TV Movie) as Lieutenant Henry Lawton
- 1985 Wildside (TV) as Grosset (final television appearance)
