= Roadracers (1959 film) =

- Original AIP double feature film poster
- Directed by: Arthur Swerdloff
- Written by: Stanley Kallis; Ed Lakso
- Based on: original story by Stanley Kallis
- Produced by: Stanley Kallis
- Starring: Joel Lawrence
- Cinematography: Carl E. Guthrie
- Music by: Richard Markowitz
- Production company: Catalina Productions
- Distributed by: American International Pictures
- Release date: 1959
- Running time: 72 minutes
- Country: United States
- Language: English

Roadracers is a 1959 American action film. It was released by American International Pictures as a double feature with Daddy-O (1958).

== Cast ==
- Joel Lawrence as Rob Wilson
- Marian Collier as Liz
- Skip Ward as Greg Morgan
- Sally Fraser as Joanie Wilson
