= Jennifer Billingsley =

American actress

Jennifer I. Billingsley
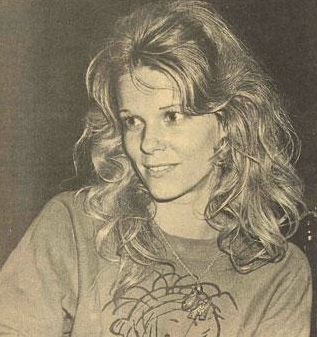
- Billingsley in 1972
- Born: Honolulu, Hawaii, U.S.
- Occupation: Actress
- Years active: 1962–1979
- Spouse: Jesse Lee Kincaid

Jennifer Billingsley is a retired American television, stage and film actress.

== Early years ==
One of two daughters of Army Col. Claude Augustus Billingsley, she was born in Honolulu, Hawaii, and relocated often as an "Army brat," attending schools in Vienna and Chicago, and graduating with honors from Fort Smith Senior High School in Arkansas.

== Career ==
Billingsley's stage debut came in Detroit, Michigan, and she debuted on Broadway in the musical Carnival!

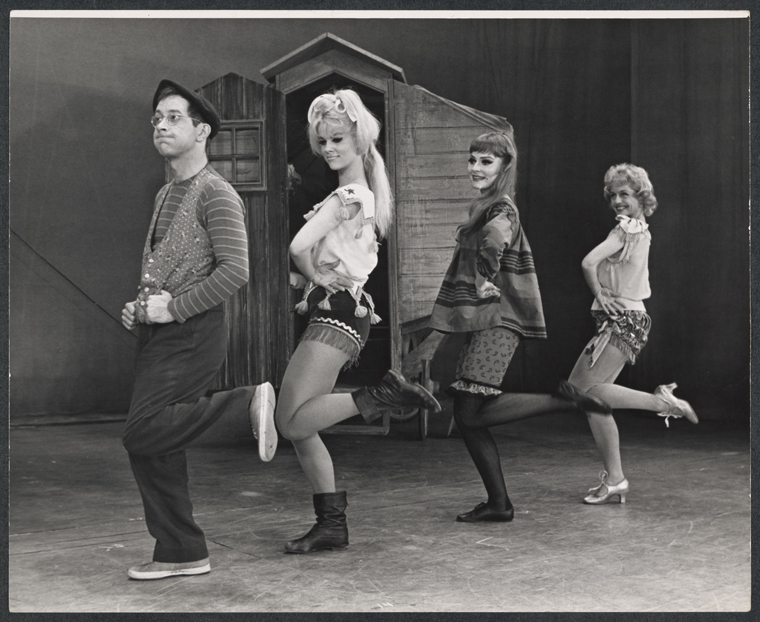
Pierre Olaf, Jennifer Billingsley, and dancers in the stage production of Carnival!

Her film debut came as James Caan's girlfriend in the 1964 thriller, Lady in a Cage, and she appeared in the romantic drama, The Young Lovers that same year. She had a recurring role on the daytime soap opera, General Hospital and prominent roles in such films as The Spy with My Face (1965), C.C. and Company (1970), Brute Corps (1971), Welcome Home, Soldier Boys (1972), White Lightning (1973), The Thirsty Dead (1974) and Hollywood Man (1976).

Billingsley's guest spots on TV included Cimarron Strip, Naked City, Gunsmoke, Route 66, The Adventures of Ozzie and Harriet, Dr. Kildare, The Lieutenant, Wagon Train, The Man from U.N.C.L.E., Mannix, The F.B.I., Hawaii Five-O, Police Story, Alice, Baretta, and The Amazing Spider-Man.

== Personal life ==
Billingsley was married to musician Jesse Lee Kincaid, who played classical guitar and composed music.

== Filmography ==
Year	Title	Role	Notes
1962	Naked City	Helen	Season 3 Episode 17 "One of the Most Important Men in the Whole World"
1962	Ten Girls Ago	Dollina	TV Movie 32m
1962	Route 66	Janie	Season 3 Episode 11 "Hey, Moth, Come Eat the Flame"
1963	General Hospital	Pollie Prentice	Season 1
1963	Dr. Kildare	Ruby Cullen	Season 3 Episode 2 "The Good Samaritan"
1963	Gunsmoke	Leah	Season 9 Episode 6 "My Sister's Keeper"
1964	The Greatest Show on Earth	Marie	Season 1 Episode 20 "Man in a Hole"
1964	The Lieutenant	Ginny McBain	Season 1 Episode 27 "Mother Enemy"
1964	Death Valley Days	Janet Wilgus	Season 12 Episode 22 "Trial at Belle's Springs"
1964	Lady in a Cage	Elaine	Not Rated 1h 34m
1964	Vacation Playhouse	Jo Anne Smith	Season 2 Episode 4 "I and Claudie"
1964	The Young Lovers	Elaine	Approved 1h 49m
1964	The Man from U.N.C.L.E.	Taffy	Season 1 Episode 8 "The Double Affair"
1965	Wagon Train	Eloise Blee/ Betsy Blee	Season 8 Episode 22 "The Betsy Blee Smith Story"
1965	The Spy with My Face	Taffy	Not Rated 1h 28m
1965	O.K. Crackerby!	Tish Kranepool	Season 1 Episode 6 "The Saint John Raid"
1965	The Man from U.N.C.L.E.	First Model	Season 2 Episode 13 "The Adriatic Express Affair"
1965	The Adventures of Ozzie and Harriet	Blonde	Season 13 Episode 23 "Breakfast for Harriet"
1966	The Adventures of Ozzie and Harriet	Tickle Feather	Season 14 Episode 17 "Wally's Traffic Ticket"
1966	The Rounders	Bonnie	Season 1 Episode 1 "A Horse on Jim Ed Love"
1967	Mannix	Audrey Chalmers	Season 1 Episode 11 "A Catalogue of Sins"
1968	Cimarron Strip	Josie	Season 1 Episode 18 "Knife in the Darkness"
1970	Hawaii Five-O	Annette Barnes	Season 2 Episode 21 "Most Likely to Murder"
1970	C.C. and Company	Pom Pom	R 1h 34m
1971	Brute Corps	Terry	R 1h 27m
1971	The F.B.I.	Wanda Moore	Season 6 Episode 26 "Three-Way Split"
1971	The F.B.I.	Mavis Barret	Season 7 Episode 6 "The Mastermind: Part 1"
1971	Welcome Home, Soldier Boys	Broad	R 1h 31m
1972	The Rookies	Jill Danko	Season 1 Episode 0 "Pilot"
1973	White Lightning	Lou	PG 1h 41m
1973	The New Perry Mason	Elsa Collins	Season 1 Episode 12 "The Case of the Perilous Pen"
1974	Police Story	Lorraine	Season 1 Episode 12 "Countdown: Part 1"
1974	Police Story	Lorraine	Season 1 Episode 13 "Countdown: Part 2"
1974	The Thirsty Dead	Laura	PG 1h 28m
1976	Alice	Gertrude Turner	Season 1 Episode 3 "A Piece of the Rock"
1976	Hollywood Man	Buttons	Not Rated 1h 47m
1976	Baretta	Dancer	Season 3 Episode 10 "Nothin' for Nothin'"
1979	The Amazing Spider-Man	Bonita Gray	Season 2 Episode 5 "Photo Finish'"
