= Terror in the Haunted House =

- Theatrical poster
- Directed by: Harold Daniels
- Screenplay by: Robert C. Dennis
- Produced by: William S. Edwards
- Starring: Gerald Mohr; Cathy O'Donnell; William Ching
- Cinematography: Frederick E. West
- Edited by: Tholen Gladden
- Music by: Darrell Calker
- Distributed by: Howco International Pictures
- Release date: November 1958
- Running time: 85 minutes
- Country: United States
- Language: English

Terror in the Haunted House (originally titled My World Dies Screaming) is a 1958 American horror film produced by William S. Edwards and directed by Harold Daniels. The movie stars Gerald Mohr, Cathy O'Donnell, William Ching, and John Qualen. Its plot follows newlywed Sheila, who moves with her husband Philp into a rural Florida mansion which she is horrified to discover was the subject of a recurring nightmare for which she sought psychiatric care in Switzerland. The house is the key to events that have haunted her husband's family for a generation, and Philip's intent is to use her mind to unlock the mystery.

The film is notable for being one of only two movies shot in Psychorama, a stylistic gimmick which incorporated subliminal imaging onscreen. Psychorama, also known as the Precon Process, is an example of the "pure hype and hucksterism" which was a component of the "effort to (...) cash in on the mid-1950s controversy over subliminal advertising."

== Plot ==
After living in Switzerland for seventeen years, Sheila marries Philip Justin. She also begins having nightmares about a mansion owned by the Tierneys, a family she does not know.

Back in the US, after driving up to their destination in Florida, Sheila is horrified to see the nightmare mansion. Philip insists that her nightmares will end if they stay there. Caretaker Jonah Snell tells Sheila that the house was abandoned seventeen years earlier and he has been waiting ever since for "the mad Tierneys" to come home.

Sheila begs Philip to take her away. He reluctantly agrees to leave, but the car will not start. Apparently someone has damaged the engine, forcing them to spend the night in the mansion.

Despite believing that she had never been there before, Sheila has vague memories of, as a little girl, falling in love with a boy who carved their initials on a tree trunk. Jonah denies the tree's existence.

That night, Sheila is awakened by screams, then sees a figure peering through her window. She tells Philip of what happened, and he decides it was Jonah trying to scare them away.

Come morning, Sheila finds a tree marked "SW + PT." SW are her old initials ("Sheila Wayne" was her maiden name) but cannot remember who PT is. Nevertheless, it proves that she had been there before.

Mark Snell, the mansion's owner, arrives and recognizes Philip each other. Confused about his presence, Mark decide to leave. Then he mistakenly calls Sheila "Mrs. Tierney", before quickly correcting himself. Sheila now understands the initials on the tree. PT is Philip Tierney – her husband's real name.

She asks Philip about his name and why he lied about the nightmare house. He admits everything and tells her that the two years she had spent in a Swiss sanatorium were not due to tuberculosis, as she thought, but because at age seven she had had a nervous breakdown. The only way Sheila will be cured is to discover why she blanked out her memories. But to do so, she will have to go into the attic, the room that terrifies her. She will not go, so Philip stomps off in anger.

Jonah tells Sheila that at midnight, on the same day seventeen years earlier, Matthew Tierney – Philip's grandfather – killed his sons Lawrence and Samuel in the attic with an axe. He then died. Samuel was Philip's father and Philip is the last of the Tierneys.

Mark convinces Sheila that Philip is trying to drive her mad. He says that he and Jonah will stand guard outside the bedroom. After being jolted awake by footsteps and screaming, she opens the door and sees Jonah fall from the stairs, to his death. Philip declares that Mark killed Jonah. Philip starts their car – which he himself had disabled – and tells Mark to head for the police station, as he is unfamiliar with the local roads. Mark leaves, and Sheila locks herself in the bedroom.

Philp bursts in and taunts Sheila to shoot him, to no avail. She loves him but believes he is becoming insane and asks to let her help him. He agrees, but only if she does whatever he says. He drags her to the attic, where she finally remembers witnessing the murders as a child. The recovered memory cures her on the spot. Sheila also suddenly knows that Jonah was the one who killed the Tierneys, insanely jealous of their wealth and wanting it all for his son, Mark.

In the attic, Mark attacks Philip with an axe. As they fight, Philip throws him onto the axe's pick end, impaling him on the point.

While leaving the mansion, Philip summarizes the situation for Sheila. A guilt-ridden Jonah paid for her to go to Switzerland after the murders. Mark killed Jonah before he could confess. They walk out the door and Sheila says of the mansion, "it was truly haunted."

== Cast ==
- Gerald Mohr as Philip Tierney
- Cathy O'Donnell as Sheila Wayne Tierney (in credits as Kathy O'Donnell)
- William Ching as Mark Snell (in credits as Bill Snell)
- John Qualen as Jonah Snell
- Barry Bernard as Dr. Victor Forel

== Production ==
Life magazine, in its 31 March 1958 issue, ran an article on the use of sublminals in movies. The article says that My World Dies Screaming was not shot as a "subliminal perception" film per se. Rather, producer Edwards met the developers of the Precon Process, liked the idea, and had them "dub in" the subliminal images after the film had been completed.

The film used a prologue and an epilogue as a framing device. In the prologue, Mohr, directly addressing the audience, explained what Psychorama is, and in the epilogue, how it works. However, both the prologue and the epilogue had been removed from the video of the film by the time it was issued. Also, according to the AFI, "in the [film] print viewed, the original subliminal frames were replaced by animated drawings created for the video release."

Only two films were made using Psychorama. The second, A Date with Death, a modern-day crime drama filmed in Roswell, New Mexico, was released in June 1959, less than a year after My World Dies Screaming. It too was from Howco Productions, produced by Edwards, directed by Daniels, and starred Mohr. Exactly what subliminal images were used in the film is apparently unknown. In the print the AFI viewed, "No inserted words or images were detected (...) either at normal or slow speed." But in certain parts of the film, "white dots flashed momentarily on the screen, indicating the likely places where the subliminal messages originally appeared."

== Subliminals ==
After My World Dies Screaming was completed, Edwards did a presentation of Psychorama to a film trade group, the FCC, and the National Association of Broadcasters (NAB), to whom he showed clips from two versions of the film. One version contained "subliminal messages" and the other "the exaggerated supraliminal symbols" which are visible to the naked eye and found in the film and video as they exist today. As to the use of Psychorama in movies, the Motion Picture Herald favorably noted in its 8 November 1958 issue that "exploitationwise, the undertaking as distinct showmanship possibilities" and "sarcastically predicted that it would soon be possible 'for a showman to tell his patrons that they are seeing a second-feature film unconsciously, at the same time they are seeing the top feature consciously.'"

Afraid of the supposed power of subliminals, the NAB amended its Television Code to prohibit TV stations from using "subliminal projection" in the advertisements they broadcast. Breaking the prohibition meant that the station might lose its NAB "Seal of Good Practice." The three television networks – ABC, CBS, and NBC – followed suit, banning the use of sublminals in advertising shown on their affiliated stations. However, no action was taken by any US governmental agency or by Congress, so that "To the present day there is no law [in the US] dealing with the issue of subliminally presented material" in advertising or programming on radio, television, or in film. In the UK, though, the use of subliminal imaging "as a persuasive technique" was banned "from 1962 onward (...) because of the effect of this mental-imprint on young children's minds."

== Distribution ==
My World Dies Screaming was distributed to theatres in the US by Howco Productions and in the UK by Eros Films.

As Terror in the Haunted House, the film was syndicated to TV stations in the US in February 1962 as part of Allied Artist's "Sci-Fi for the 60s" package of 22 films.

== Release ==
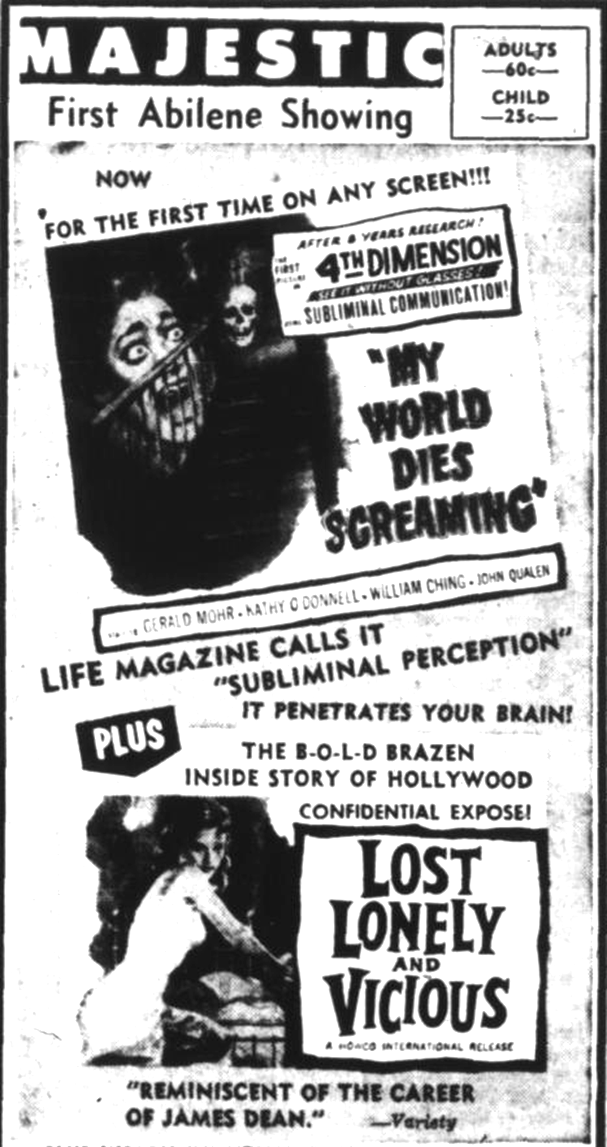
Advertisement from 1959 for My World Dies Screaming and co-feature, Lost, Lonely and Vicious

My World Dies Screaming was released theatrically in the United States on a double bill with Lost, Lonely and Vicious in 1958. However, according to the AFI. it did not have its "official" premiere until 1961 in Los Angeles, by which time it had already been re-titled Terror in the Haunted House. The movie also played on an American International Pictures double bill in May 1961 with Hammer Film Productions 1960 release The Two Faces of Dr. Jekyll (aka Jekyll's Inferno aka House of Fright), "but that didn't last long" and the film was withdrawn from further theatrical showings.

A X-certificate was issued for the film by the BBFC on 16 February 1959, which prevented it from being shown in the UK to theatre audience members under age 16. However, My World Dies Screaming only "made it onto the British circuits in late 1961. playing second feature to the King Brothers' monster movie Gorgo (1961)." The Encyclopedia of Horror Movies also states a UK release date of 1961.

In 2001, Rhino Entertainment released the film on DVD. The DVD's box, according to critic Clive Davies, claims erroneously that the film "was banned by the US Government."

== Reception ==
Reviews of My World Dies Screaming/Terror in the Haunted House appear to be scarce, and, of those, several are quite short and rather negative. For example. Davies calls the film a "b/w suspense bore" with "occasional, not at all scary subliminal images" and Clive Gilmour in the 2 January 1960 issue of Maclean's ranks My World Dies Screaming as the second-worst movie of 1959, although no review accompanies the ranking.

Likewise, British film scholar Phil Hardy's review is unfavorable, calling the film a "verbose slice of cut-price psychology devoted to the well-worn theme of the husband who tries to drive his wife mad. Or so it seems (...). Hardy also notes that "The sole interest of the film is that (...) the horror was supposedly enhanced by words or images subliminally superimposed on the screen."

The subliminal superimpositions are described by academic critic Kevin Heffernan as "single frame, 'hidden' images such as skulls, knives, and spelled words like 'death' designed to trigger the audience's emotional responses." He goes on to say that these "subliminal imprints (...) remain below the level of consciousness of the viewer, supposedly causing a palpable but unexplainable dread and horror."

In a similar vein, Atkinson describes the imprints as "a devil face, a bug-eyed face, a skull (in red), a cobra head and the message 'scream bloody murder'". But he gives the film a relatively favorable review, writing that it "is worth a look, if only to see how it was all done without the aide of copious amounts of Technicolour blood and gore that signified the psycho thrillers of the upcoming decades."

"Significantly," writes Ackland, "the film reiterates the idea that the mind has a secret life, one that can be accessed with specifically designed procedures and techniques." Within the film, "induced dreams and hypnosis can recover deeply repressed memories, the associated horror being relived and re-experienced' by the characters and shared with the audience through the use of Psychorama.

== Influence ==
The film is most notable for popularizing the notion that certain films contain subliminal images, which continues to arise from time to time, with recent allegations of, for example, sexual images inserted into Disney's animated children's films and "terrifying" images of corpses embedded in the Swedish-American horror film Midsommer (2019).

The film was sampled by the rock band Evanescence in the song "Understanding" from the Evanescence EP and "Origin" on the demo CD Origin.
