= Ray Girardin =

American film, stage, and television actor (1935–2019)

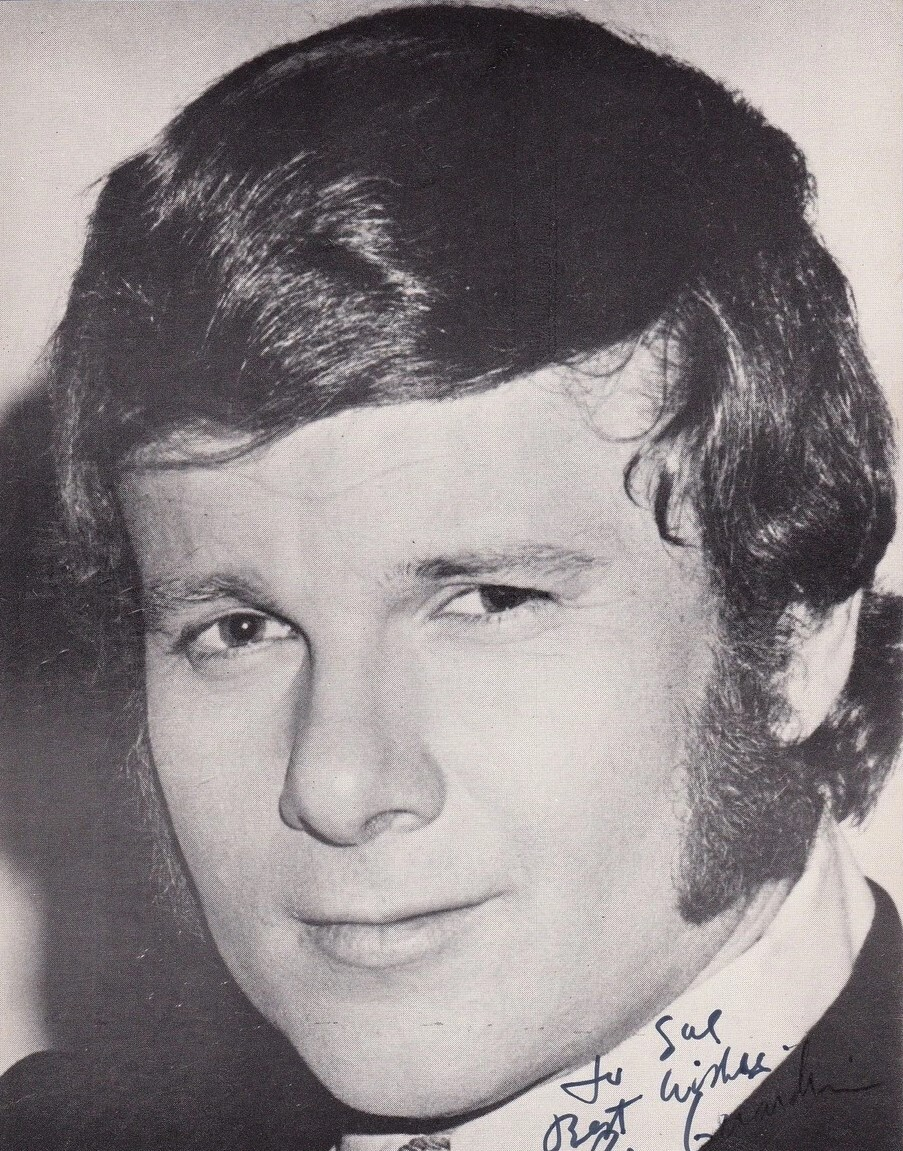
- Born: Raymond George Girardin Jr. January 23, 1935; Wakefield, Massachusetts, U.S.
- Died: February 28, 2019 (aged 84); Amherst, Massachusetts, U.S.
- Education: Boston University
- Occupations: Film, stage and television actor
- Years active: 1967–1999
- Spouse: Marlene Girardin
- Children: 1

Raymond George Girardin Jr. (January 23, 1935 – February 28, 2019) was an American film, stage, and television actor.

== Life and career ==
Girardin was born in Wakefield, Massachusetts. He attended and graduated from Wakefield High School, which after graduating, he served in the United States Marine Corps for two years, which after his discharge, he attended Boston University, studying theatre. He acted on summer stock theaters and Off-Broadway plays. He began his screen career in 1967, appearing in the NBC spy fiction television series The Man from U.N.C.L.E. In the same year, he appeared in the ABC legal drama television series Judd, for the Defense. The next year, he played Howie Dawson in the ABC soap opera television series General Hospital until 1974.

Later in his career, Girardin guest-starred in numerous television programs such as Barney Miller, The Rockford Files, Thunder, St. Elsewhere, The Greatest American Hero, Hart to Hart, Hardcastle and McCormick, Hill Street Blues, Newhart, Remington Steele, The Law & Harry McGraw, Married... with Children, The A-Team, What's Happening Now!!, Benson, Mork & Mindy, Happy Days, From Here to Eternity, Gunsmoke, The White Shadow, T.J. Hooker, Hooperman, The Magical World of Disney, Murder, She Wrote, Baywatch, New York Undercover, Capital News, and L.A. Law, and was a regular cast member of Flip Wilson's television sitcom Charlie & Co., playing Charles Richmond's boss Walter Simpson. He also appeared in numerous films including Max Dugan Returns, The Lonely Guy, Star!, Scandal in a Small Town, Loverboy, The Executioner's Song, Midnight Offerings, Dad, Silence of the Heart, Badge of the Assassin, Love Affair, Gospa, Number One with a Bullet, and Hollywood Man, which he co-wrote with William Smith, Tom Farese and Dominic Gombardella.

Girardin retired from acting in 1999, afterwards directing at the Academy Theater in Orleans, Massachusetts, on Cape Cod.

== Death ==
Girardin died on February 28, 2019, from complications of Alzheimer's disease, in Amherst, Massachusetts, at the age of 84.
