= Rafael Campos (actor) =

American actor (1936–1985)

- Campos in Temple Houston, 1963
- Born: May 13, 1936; Santiago de los Caballeros, Santiago Province, Dominican Republic
- Died: July 9, 1985 (aged 49); Los Angeles, California, U.S.
- Occupation: Actor
- Years active: 1955–1985
- Spouse: Dinah Washington (m. 1961; div. 1962)

Rafael Campos (May 13, 1936 – July 9, 1985) was a Dominican-American actor whose credits include Blackboard Jungle (1955), Dino (1957), The Light in the Forest (1958), Slumber Party '57 (1976), The Astro-Zombies (1968), Centennial (1978) and V (1983). He was briefly married to blues singer and pianist Dinah Washington. Rafael acted in at least 2 episodes of “The Big Valley” in the 1960s. One episode is “Fall of a Hero.” Rafael played the character of Charley White Horse. Also, he played the character of Santiago in the episode “Four Days to Furnace Hill.”

== Background ==
Originally from the Dominican Republic, he moved to the United States in 1949. From 1961 to 1962, he was married to Dinah Washington, who was 12 years his senior. In 1961, Jet magazine published a photo with Washington embracing both Campos, reportedly her seventh husband, and her ex-husband Eddie Chamblee, reportedly her fifth husband. He then married the model Sally Boyd, with whom he had two daughters.

One of Campos's brothers is the cryptographer, artist, and poet Luis Campos; another brother, Fernando Campos, is the president of New York's Latin ACE awards.

== Career ==
Campos had a career that lasted 30 years. He was spotted by the director Richard Brooks during a theater production of Heavenly Express. Thanks to Brooks, he had a starring role alongside Glenn Ford, Vic Morrow, Margaret Hayes and Sidney Poitier in the 1955 film Blackboard Jungle. In the 1955 film Trial, he reunited with Glenn Ford to play the part of a Chicano teenager wrongfully accused of murdering a white girl from a rich family at a beach party. Ford portrays a college law instructor who defends Campos' character. Other appearances include an episode of Have Gun – Will Travel, playing a teenager who stole a statue of St. Francis of Assisi and the episode "Pancho" in 1959. Also that year, he played the title character in "The Swift Cloud Story" (S2E27) on Wagon Train.

During the 1960s, he was in the Ted V. Mikels-directed film The Astro-Zombies, which starred John Carradine, Wendell Corey and Tura Satana. He played the part of Juan.

Among his TV credits is a 1962 appearance on Alfred Hitchcock Presents, titled "The Big Score". He played the lead as a teen gang member who kills and robs a man who turns out to be a mob boss. He also played a young Mexican boy, Juan De La O, who stole a horse in an episode of Laramie (season 3, episode 15), titled "The Barefoot Kid". Rafael played a young soldier on S12 E4 of Gunsmoke The Mission on October 8, 1966. Rafael had a memorable role in an episode of All In the Family where Archie is told to fire Little Immanuel, who was a member of his crew at work. From 1977 to 1978, the actor had a recurring role as Ramon Diaz Jr. in the series Rhoda. He appeared in 10 episodes of the show.

Possibly his last credited film role was in 1986 in The Return of Josey Wales, in which he played Chato.

== Death ==
Campos was diagnosed with stomach cancer and entered the Motion Picture and Television Hospital in Woodland Hills, Los Angeles in December 1984. He died at the hospital on July 9, 1985, aged 49. He was buried at Valley Oaks Memorial Park in Westlake Village.

== Filmography ==
Year	Title	Role	Notes
1955	Blackboard Jungle	Pete V. Morales	
1955	Trial	Angel Chavez	
1956	The Sharkfighters	Carlos	
1957	This Could Be the Night	Hussein Mohammed	
1957	Dino	Boy #2	
1958	The Light in the Forest	Half Arrow	
1958	Tonka	Strong Bear	
1959	Wanted Dead or Alive	Pachito	Season 2 Episode 11: "Desert Seed"
1959	Wagon Train	Swift Cloud	Season 2 Episode 27: "The Swift Cloud Story"
1959	The Restless Gun	El Diablo	Season 2 Episode 33: "Ride with the Devil"
1959	Have Gun – Will Travel	Pancho	Season 3 Episode 6: "Pancho"
1960	Wagon Train	Dr. Swift Cloud	Season 3 Episode 33: "Dr. Swift Cloud"
1962	Have Gun – Will Travel	Paco	Season 6 Episode 10: "A Miracle for St. Francis"
1962	Alfred Hitchcock Presents	Gino	Season 7 Episode 22: "The Big Score"
1963	Savage Sam	Young Warrior	
1964	Lady in a Cage	Essie	
1966	Agent for H.A.R.M.	Luis	
1966	Mister Buddwing	Dice Player #7	
1966	The Appaloosa	Paco	
1967	The Big Valley	Santiago	Season 3 Episode 12 "Four Days to Furnace Hill"
1968	The Big Valley	Charlie White Horse	Season 3 Episode 20 "Fall of a Hero"
1968	Girl in Gold Boots		Uncredited
1968	The Astro-Zombies	Juan	
1971	Outlaw Riders	Pedro	
1973	Oklahoma Crude	Jimmy	
1973	The Doll Squad	Rafael	
1974	Hangup	Longnose	
1976	Slumber Party '57	Dope Fiend	
1978	Centennial	Nacho Gomez	
1980	Where the Buffalo Roam	Rojas	
1983	Heartbreaker	Alfonso	
1984	V The Final Battle	Sancho Gomez	
1985	Fever Pitch	Rafael	
1986	The Return of Josey Wales	Chato	(final film role)
