= The Astro-Zombies =

1968 film by Ted V. Mikels

- Theatrical release poster
- Directed by: Ted V. Mikels
- Screenplay by: Ted V. Mikels; Wayne Rogers
- Produced by: Ted V. Mikels
- Starring: John Carradine; Wendell Corey; Tura Satana; Rafael Campos; Tom Pace
- Cinematography: Robert Maxwell
- Edited by: Art Names
- Music by: Nico Karaski
- Production companies: Ram Ltd.; Ted V. Mikels Film Productions
- Release date: May 19, 1968
- Running time: 94 minutes
- Country: United States
- Language: English
- Budget: $37,000
- Box office: $3 million+ (unconfirmed)

The Astro-Zombies is a 1968 American science fiction horror film written, directed and produced by Ted V. Mikels, and starring John Carradine, Wendell Corey, and Tura Satana.

== Plot ==
Having been fired by the space agency, a disgruntled scientist creates superhuman monsters from the body parts of murder victims. The creatures eventually escape and go on a killing spree, attracting the attention of both an international spy ring and the CIA.

== Cast ==
- Wendell Corey as Holman
- John Carradine as Dr. DeMarco
- Tom Pace as Eric Porter
- Joan Patrick as Janine Norwalk
- Tura Satana as Satana
- Rafael Campos as Juan
- Joseph Hoover as Chuck Edwards
- Victor Izay as Dr. Petrovich
- William Bagdad as Franchot
- Vincent Barbi as Tyros
- Vic Lance as the chauffeur
- Egon Sirany as Sergio Demozhenin
- Rod Wilmoth as Astro-Zombie #1 / Astro Zombie #2

== Production ==
Mikels said he started writing it when he made his first film, Strike Me Deadly.

Produced by Ram Ltd. and Ted V. Mikels Film Production, The Astro-Zombies was filmed on a low budget of $37,000, with $3,000 of the budget used to pay Carradine. The film would be Mikels' last collaboration with Wayne M. Rogers (of later M*A*S*H fame), who also co-wrote and co-produced the film. Scenes were shot at the residence of Peter Falk, a friend of Rogers that was to be featured in a cameo that Mikels cut because of being "too funny".

Mikels remembers it as "a very easy shoot. I shot half of it myself because I only had money for a crew for two weeks, so I spent two weeks shooting all the stuff around town, all the chases and all that".

The score was written by Nico Karaski, cinematography was handled by Robert Maxwell and editing by Art Names.

== Release and reception ==
The Astro-Zombies was released in May 1968, at a runtime of 94 minutes.

Variety wrote: "There's almost nothing good to say for this horror scifier ... The scifi aspects don't enthrall and the thrill aspects don't shock". Author and film critic Leonard Maltin awarded the film the lowest possible rating of "Bomb", calling it "yet another nominee for worst picture of all time". On his website Fantastic Movie Musings and Ramblings, Dave Sindelar called the film "wretched", criticizing the film's messy plot and "talky/dull" scenes. TV Guide called the film "one of the all-time worst sci-fi pictures".

In a retrospective review, David Cornelius of eFilmCritic.com gave the film 1 out of 5 stars, calling it the worst film ever made, and criticized the film's acting, its "painful-to-the-eyes production values", and the film's absence of reason.

== Sequels ==
Nearly 40 years after the film's release, Mikels would direct three low-budget sequels starting with 2004's Mark of the Astro-Zombies, 2010's Astro-Zombies M3: Cloned, and 2012's Astro-Zombies M4: Invaders from Cyberspace. Tura Satana would return for the second and third films prior to her death in 2011.

== Influence ==
American horror punk band the Misfits recorded a song titled "Astro Zombies", released on their 1982 album Walk Among Us. The lyrics, by frontman Glenn Danzig, were written from the perspective of mad scientist Dr. DeMarco. The film was riffed in 2016 by comedians Michael J. Nelson, Bill Corbett, and Kevin Murphy for Rifftrax.
