= Stuart Lancaster (actor) =

American actor (1920–2000)

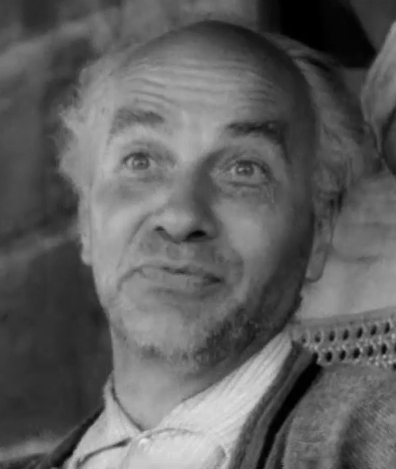
- Lancaster in Faster, Pussycat! Kill! Kill!, 1965
- Born: Stuart Gage Lancaster; November 30, 1920; Evanston, Illinois, U.S.
- Died: December 22, 2000 (aged 80); Los Angeles, California, U.S.
- Occupation: Actor
- Years active: 1963–1998
- Spouses: Martha Ann Rhubottom (m. 1944; div. 1947); Betty Warren (m. 1949; div. 1960); Ivy Bethune (m. 1971)

Stuart Gage Lancaster (November 30, 1920 – December 22, 2000) was an American actor known for roles in Russ Meyer films.

== Biography ==
Born in Evanston, Illinois, Lancaster's grandfather was circus owner Charles Ringling. He served as an aviator in the United States Navy in World War II. He moved to Los Angeles in 1962.

Lancaster appeared in several Meyer films, including Mudhoney, Faster, Pussycat! Kill! Kill!, Good Morning and... Goodbye!, Supervixens, and Beneath the Valley of the Ultra-Vixens. He also had a recurring role on The Young and the Restless and a part in Edward Scissorhands. He appeared on stage as the Marquis de Sade in a Los Angeles production of the play Marat/Sade. He was sometimes credited as Stewart Lancaster or Stud Lancaster.

Lancaster was the founder and director of the Palm Tree Playhouse in Sarasota, Florida. He died in Los Angeles, California. His wife Ivy Bethune and stepdaughter Zina Bethune were both actresses. He had five children, Mark Lancaster, Paul Gooding, Lynne Lancaster, John Lancaster aka Guruatma S. Khalsa and Michael Lancaster.

== Selected filmography ==
- Mudhoney (1965) – Lute Wade
- Faster, Pussycat! Kill! Kill! (1965) – The Old Man
- The Born Losers (1967) – Sheriff Harvey
- Good Morning and... Goodbye! (1967) – Burt Boland
- Mantis in Lace (1968) – Frank
- Thar She Blows! (1968) – Kenyon Adler
- The Secret Sex Lives of Romeo and Juliet (1969) – Lord Capulet
- The Ecstasies of Women (1969) – Bartender (uncredited)
- Precious Jewels (1969)
- Starlet! (1969) – Kenyon Adler
- The Satin Mushroom (1969) – Mexican Lawyer
- Wilbur and the Baby Factory (1970) – W.W.
- Captain Milkshake (1970) – Cabby
- The Long Swift Sword of Siegfried (1971) – King Gunther (English version, voice, uncredited)
- The Seven Minutes (1971) – Dr. Roger Trimble
- Godmonster of Indian Flats (1973) – Mayor Charles Silverdale
- Supervixens (1975) – Lute
- Goodbye, Norma Jean (1976) – George
- Alex Joseph and His Wives (1977) – Motel Manager
- Hughes and Harlow: Angels in Hell (1977) – Charlie
- The Brain Machine (1977) – Senator
- Beneath the Valley of the Ultra-Vixens (1979) – The Man From Small Town U.S.A.
- Mistress of the Apes (1979) – Brady
- The Loch Ness Horror (1982) – Professor Pratt
- The Naked Gun: From the Files of Police Squad! (1988) – Press Conference Toilet Voiceover (uncredited)
- Down on Us (1989) – New York Cabbie
- Goodnight, Sweet Marilyn (1989) – George
- Edward Scissorhands (1990) – Retired Man
- Batman Returns (1992) – Penguin's Doctor
- The Treat (1998) – Vinny (final film role)
