= Blood Orgy =

Blood Orgy may refer to:

== Books ==
- Blood Orgy, a 1966 novel by Helene Morgan, illustrated by Gene Bilbrew

== Film ==
- The Gore Gore Girls, a 1972 splatter film released as Blood Orgy in some markets
- "Blood Orgy", a segment of the 1976 film Fantasm
- Blood Orgy of the She-Devils, a 1973 horror film
- Blood Orgy of the Leather Girls, a 1988 horror film

== Music ==
- "Blood Orgy", a song on the band Autopsy on their 1996 album Shitfun
- Blood Orgy!!!, a 2003 EP by Les Mouches
- "(Theme from) Blood Orgy of the Atomic Fern", a song by the Dead Milkmen from their 1987 album Bucky Fellini
- Blood Orgy in College Park - Stalking the Airwaves, a 2010 live album by Deceased
