= Eye of the Cat =

1969 American horror film

- Directed by: David Lowell Rich
- Written by: Joseph Stefano
- Produced by: Bernard Schwartz; Phillip Hazelton
- Starring: Michael Sarrazin; Gayle Hunnicutt; Eleanor Parker
- Cinematography: Russell Metty; Ellsworth Fredericks
- Edited by: J. Terry Williams
- Music by: Lalo Schifrin
- Production company: Joseph L. Schenck Enterprises
- Distributed by: Universal Pictures
- Release date: June 18, 1969 (New York City)
- Running time: 102 minutes
- Country: United States
- Language: English
- Box office: $1.2 million (US/ Canada rentals)

Eye of the Cat is a 1969 American horror film directed by David Lowell Rich and starring Michael Sarrazin, Gayle Hunnicutt, and Eleanor Parker. The screenplay is by Joseph Stefano, best known as the co-creator and writer for the TV-series The Outer Limits, and who wrote the screenplay for Alfred Hitchcock's Psycho.

== Plot ==
Danielle, a rich, elderly woman, accompanied by her nephew, Luke, goes to a beauty parlor to get her hair done. While she is there, she begins to struggle breathing, due to two-thirds of her lungs being missing. When Danielle's beauty girl, Kassia Lancaster, sees this, she calls Danielle's other nephew, Wylie, who is with a girl when she comes to pick him up. Kassia takes Wylie to her parlor and explains that after she saw Danielle, or Danny as Wylie calls her, collapse, she got the idea to kill Aunt Danny by shutting off the oxygen supply in the oxygen tent she uses every night. Wylie agrees to do it, and then he hears a cat. He has an intense fear of cats, due to one attacking him when he was a child. Suddenly, Kassia sees an orange cat and tries to stop it, but it jumps onto Wylie, who throws it into a machine, electrocuting the cat.

The next day, Wylie goes to see Aunt Danny, but leaves her room when he sees cats everywhere. He then talks to his brother, Luke, who has been caring for Aunt Danny, despite the fact that she hates him. Luke thinks that Wylie is there so that he can get Aunt Danny's inheritance when she dies, but Wylie just brushes it off. Wylie gets angry at Kassia for sending him to a house full of cats, but she says that she didn't know about them. Wylie forgives her, and the two sleep together. Luke finds out that Aunt Danny is going to leave all of her money to her cats, which shocks Wylie, and he convinces Danny to make him her heir and to get rid of the cats, which Luke does by luring them into a car with a bowl of meat. Later, Danny overhears Wylie talking to Kassia about her murder, but when she confronts Wylie he plays it off as a joke. Meanwhile, the cats begin to return.

The following morning, the will is revised, and Wylie and Danny head out to breakfast. However, Danny notices Kassia in the window of her house. Wylie goes to confront her about wanting to see the will, and Danny moves her wheelchair down the sloped sidewalk. However, while trying to go back up, the wheelchair short circuits, and she becomes stuck. While the two are arguing in the house, Kassia notices Danny, and Wiley goes out to save her but stops when he sees a cat which jumps on Danny and causes her to lose control and start rolling down the road. Thankfully, Luke saves her just in time. Later, Danny wakes up in her bed and tries to tell the doctor that Wiley and Kassia are trying to kill her but goes unconscious due to being given a sleeping pill.

Kassia goes into Danny's room and tries to shut off her oxygen, but is thwarted by a hissing orange cat that appears to be the same one electrocuted earlier. When Kassia leaves the room, she sees a large number of cats come from the cellar and follow a trail of blood into Wylie's room. Wylie sees the cats and goes into a cataleptic state when one jumps on him. Luke pulls the cat off of Wylie, and when Kassia walks in, the two kiss. It is revealed that they teamed up to kill both Danny and Wylie, leaving Luke to be the only heir. While Luke takes Wylie into the cellar and then goes into Danny's room, Kassia picks up the bowl of meat used to lure the cats, and they cause her to spill it all upon herself. The cats attack her, causing her to run downstairs and into the greenhouse after the cats cut off her access to Danny's room. Meanwhile, Luke shuts off Danny's oxygen tank. Realizing that she is trapped and surrounded by the cats, Kassia slowly climbs up a nearby ladder, and a cat pursues her. When she reaches the top, the cat bites at her, causing her to lose her balance. The ladder topples over, and Kassia falls to her death. Luke hears the commotion and finds Kassia's body. When Luke approaches her, he discovers that Danny is still alive, revealing that Wylie had brought her into the greenhouse for "safekeeping." She orders him to phone the doctor to say that Kassia's death was an accident. Wylie then walks in having come out of his paralysis, despite several cats being in the room. He tells Danny and Luke that he never intended to stay with them, and then walks out of the room, with Danny and Luke looking on in shock, and the same orange cat watching them from the ledge above.

== Cast ==
- Michael Sarrazin as Wylie
- Gayle Hunnicutt as Kassia Lancaster
- Eleanor Parker as Aunt Danny
- Tim Henry as Luke
- Laurence Naismith as Dr. Mills
- Jennifer Leak as Poor Dear
- Linden Chiles as Bendetto
- Mark Herron as Bellemondo

== Reception ==
Howard Thompson of The New York Times called the plot "an overstated, reworked and all too familiar one," and found the climax "as hokey as it is horrible." Variety wrote that the plot developments were "telegraphed from the beginning of the pic" and that the script "was written for scare value with little attention paid to gaps in logic," though director David Lowell Rich was commended for getting the actors "to speak bad lines with straight faces." Kevin Thomas of the Los Angeles Times called the film "so unintentionally hilarious that one would be tempted to recommend it were not the price of theater admissions so high these days." Gary Arnold of The Washington Post called the film "Transparently clever but fundamentally trite," and suggested the film "would make more sense if the murderers succeeded and then found to their dismay that Aunt Danny's cats, supposedly long gone, were gradually finding their way back home, as cats are wont to do." The Monthly Film Bulletin called it "amiably outlandish" and "not so much a good film as an extravagantly enjoyable one."
