= Kona Coast =

Kona Coast may refer to:

- Kona Coast, geographical feature of Big Island's Kona District in Hawaii, U.S.
- Kona Coast (film), 1968 American film directed by Lamont Johnson
- "Kona Coast", 1977 song written by members of The Beach Boys, Al Jardine, and Mike Love; appears on 1978's M.I.U. Album
