= Betty Warren (disambiguation) =

Betty Warren (1907-1990) was a British actress.

Betty Warren may also refer to:

- Betty Ford (1918–2011), first lady to Gerald Ford
- Betty Warren (artist) (1920–1993), portrait artist
- Elizabeth Warren (born 1949), senator from Massachusetts (2013–present)
