= Stuart Lancaster =

Stuart Lancaster may refer to:

- Stuart Lancaster (actor), American actor
- Stuart Lancaster (rugby union), English rugby union coach
