= Dr. Sex =

- Opening titles
- Directed by: Ted V. Mikels
- Screenplay by: Ted V. Mikels; Wayne Rogers
- Produced by: Ted V. Mikels; Wayne Rogers
- Starring: Victor Izay; Julia Calda; Ave Lezli; Guido Lavotelli; Mario Barco; Bibo Tao; Marsha Jordan; Lolita Angeles; Giovanni Duvalier; Palva Itano; Nina Lucia; Chan Wingo
- Cinematography: Gregory Sandor
- Edited by: Gregorio Martino
- Music by: Nicholas Carras
- Release date: 1964
- Country: United States
- Language: English

Dr. Sex (also known as Dr. S- in the United States) is a 1964 American film directed by Ted V. Mikels, from a screenplay by Mikels and Wayne Rogers, who both also produced the film. The film follows three sexologists who discuss their strangest cases. Mikels said the film was originally called The Doctors and was based on an idea of Rogers', who had been impressed by Mikels' first film, Strike Me Deadly.

== Cast ==
- Victor Izay as Dr. Sex
- Julia Calda as Dr. Lovejoy
- Ave Lezli
- Guido Lavotelli
- Mario Barco
- Bibo Tao
- Marsha Jordan as Julie
- Lolita Angeles
- Giovanni Duvalier
- Palva Itano
- Nina Lucia
- Chan Wingo
