= Steve Ihnat =

Slovak-born American actor and director

- Ihnat in the made-for-television film Hunter (filmed in 1970)
- Born: Stefan Ihnat; August 7, 1934; Jastrabie pri Michalovciach, Czechoslovakia
- Died: May 12, 1972 (aged 37); Cannes, France
- Occupation: Actor
- Years active: 1958–1972
- Spouse: Marya Carter (m. 1970)
- Children: 1

Stefan Ihnat (August 7, 1934 – May 12, 1972) was a Slovak-born American actor and director, raised in Lynden, Ontario, Canada, who later moved to the US.

== Early life ==
Ihnat was born to Andrew and Mary Ihnat in Slovakia and was raised on a farm in Lynden, Ontario. His family settled there after fleeing his native Czechoslovakia in 1939, when he was five years old. Ihnat, his mother, father, younger sister, and two young boys from other families left Czechoslovakia three days before Prague was occupied by invading German forces in March of that year.

== Film and television career ==
Ihnat moved to the United States in 1956 to pursue a career in acting and attended the Pasadena Playhouse. He never gained United States citizenship. In 1959, he played a truck driver in with cargo hijackers in an episode of Highway Patrol. At a time when he had difficulty finding work, he enlisted in the United States Army for two years serving at Headquarters U.S. Army, Port Inchon, South Korea. In 1960, Pvt. Ihnat won second prize in the Republic of Korea poetry contest for his entry titled "Toil in the Night."

Ihnat guest-starred in many television series during the 1960s, including a mind-controlled lieutenant in the science fiction television series The Outer Limits in the two-part episode, "The Inheritors" (1964). In 1965, he guest starred as murderer Charlie Parks in the Perry Mason episode, "The Case of the Duplicate Case."

Ihnat held over 70 guest credits in such well known series as Star Trek episode "Whom Gods Destroy" (1969) as the psychotic Garth of Izar and also two episodes of The Fugitive, entitled "Cry Uncle" (alongside Ron Howard) and "The Walls of Night". Other credits include Blue Light ("Field of Dishonor"), Gunsmoke (“My Father’s Guitar”, "Exodus 21:22", "Jenny" with Lisa Gerritsen (December 28, 1970), “The Mission” & "Noose of Gold"), The Silent Force ("Take As Directed For Death"), Bonanza ("Dead and Gone" as Johann Brunner, "A Dream to Dream" as Josh Carter and "Terror at 2:00" as Mr. Ganns), The Virginian ("Jed" and "Last Grave at Socorro Creek"), Mission: Impossible ("The Astrologer"), ("The Mind of Stefan Miklos"), Cimarron Strip ("The Hunted"), I Dream of Jeannie ("My Master the Rainmaker"), Mannix ("Huntdown", "End Game" and "To Draw the Lightning"), The F.B.I. ("Region of Peril" and "The Prey"), The Name of the Game ("The Chains of Command" and "Nightmare"), Medical Center ("Fright and Flight") and Perry Mason ("The Case of the Duplicate Case"). In 1971 Inhat was in Sweet, Sweet Rachel, a TV movie that formed the basis for the series The Sixth Sense. He played Tom Blake in The Mod Squad episode “Search and Destroy.”

Ihnat had several guest roles in Mission: Impossible including the brilliant Soviet Union investigator Stefan Miklos in the 1969 episode "The Mind of Stefan Miklos," widely praised as one of the most cerebral and intelligent episodes of the entire series. While he played other roles (mostly villains, as in "The Astrologer") in the show, his performance in this episode is his most memorable.

From 1964 to 1968 he appeared in eight feature films. He often played villains, using his abilities to subtly turn one-dimensional characters into complex and multi-dimensional antagonists. In 1968, Lamont Johnson cast him in the film Kona Coast in which Ihnat played a murderous playboy in Hawaii doping up teenagers and causing mayhem to the property and person of the character played by lead actor Richard Boone. Also in 1968, he memorably portrayed a murderous thug in the film Madigan, starring Richard Widmark and Henry Fonda and a NASA administrator in the film Countdown, directed by Robert Altman and starring James Caan and Robert Duvall. His other film credits included The Chase (1966), In Like Flint (1967), Hour of the Gun (1967), Zig Zag (1970), and Fuzz (1972).

Ihnat was also a screenwriter and director. He wrote, produced and starred in Do Not Throw Cushions Into The Ring, which while never released, led to his directing The Honkers, starring James Coburn, with whom he had appeared in In Like Flint. He co-wrote the movie with Stephen Lodge.

== Personal life ==
Ihnat was married to Marya Carter, who posed as Playboy's Playmate of the Month for May 1962. Carter had a daughter from a previous marriage.

== Death ==
Ihnat died of a heart ailment on May 12, 1972, while attending the Cannes Film Festival in France. His death, at age 37, came one month after the birth of his son, Stefan. In addition to his wife, son and stepdaughter, he was also survived by his mother.

Ihnat was interred in the Westwood Village Memorial Park Cemetery in Los Angeles.

== Filmography ==
Year	Title	Role	Notes
1958	Dragstrip Riot	Dutch	
1960	Date Bait		
1963	Strike Me Deadly	Al	
1964	Passion Street, U.S.A.	Dick Budman	
1964	The Outer Limits	Lt. Minns	S2:E10 and S2:E11, The Inheritors pt. 1 and 2
1964	Voyage to the Bottom of the Sea	Pennell	S1:E501, The Price of Doom
1965	Brainstorm	Dr. Copleand, Interne	Uncredited
1965	Bonanza	Johann Brunner	S6:E7, Dead and Gone
1966	The Chase	Archie	
1967	In Like Flint	Carter	
1967	Countdown	Ross Duellan	
1967	Hour of the Gun	Andy Warshaw	
1968	Madigan	Barney Benesch	
1968	Kona Coast	Kryder	
1968	Bonanza	Josh Carter	S9:E26, A Dream to Dream
1969	Star Trek: The Original Series	Fleet Captain Garth of Izar	S3:E14, Whom Gods Destroy
1969	Here Come the Brides	Sergeant Todd	S2 E3 The Soldier
1970	Zig Zag	Asst. Dist. Atty. Herb Gates	
1970	Do Not Throw Cushions Into the Ring	Christopher Belton	
1972	Fuzz	Det. Andy Parker	Posthumous release
