= Zina Bethune =

American actress, dancer, and choreographer (1945–2012)

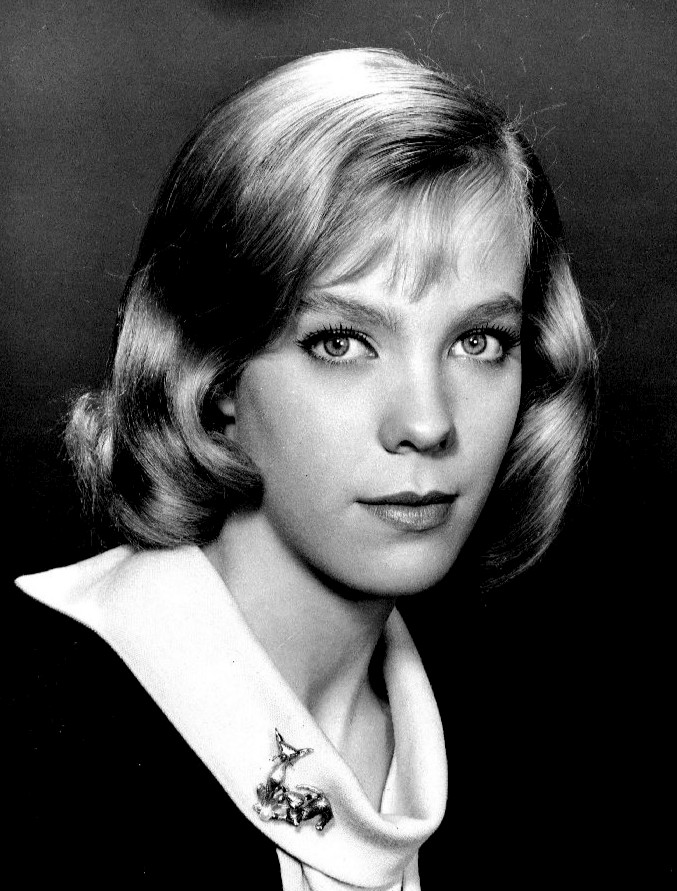
- Bethune in 1968
- Born: Zina Bianca Bethune; February 17, 1945; Staten Island, New York City, U.S.
- Died: February 12, 2012 (aged 66); Los Angeles, California, U.S.
- Occupations: Actor, ballet dancer, choreographer and teacher
- Years active: 1951–2006
- Known for: Theater Bethune
- Spouse: Sean Feeley (m. 1970)
- Parent: Ivy Bethune (mother)

Zina Bianca Bethune (February 17, 1945 – February 12, 2012) was an American actress, dancer, and choreographer. She was the daughter of actress Ivy Bethune.

== Early years ==
Bethune was born on Staten Island, the daughter of Ivy (née Vigder), a Russian-born (Sevastopol, present-day Ukraine) actress who started in the Superman radio series, and later became known for playing "Miss Tuttle" on Father Murphy and "Abigail" on General Hospital.

== Career ==
=== Theater and dance ===
Bethune began her formal ballet training aged six at George Balanchine's School of American Ballet.

By age 14 she was dancing with the New York City Ballet as Clara in the 1955 Balanchine production of The Nutcracker. Bethune's first professional acting role was at age six, with a small part in the off-Broadway play Monday's Heroes, produced by Stella Holt at the Greenwich Mews Theater.

=== Television ===
As a child performer, Bethune appeared in the original cast of The Most Happy Fella as well as several American daytime television dramas, including a stint as the first "Robin Lang" on The Guiding Light from May 1956 to April 1958.

Newspaper columnist Dick Kleiner described Bethune's performance in a 1958 television production as a "shatteringly beautiful portrayal of Tennessee Williams' young heroine in This Property Is Condemned."

In October 1958, she portrayed Amy March in the CBS musical adaptation of Little Women. She portrayed nurse Gail Lucas on The Nurses (1962–65), and appeared in other series, including Kraft Television Theatre (with Martin Huston in the series finale), Route 66, The Judy Garland Show, Pantomime Quiz, Hollywood Squares, Young Dr. Malone, Dr. Kildare, Gunsmoke, The Invaders, and Emergency!

=== Film ===
Bethune played President Franklin D. Roosevelt's daughter in Sunrise at Campobello in 1960. In 1967, Bethune starred as "The Girl" alongside Harvey Keitel in Martin Scorsese's first feature film, Who's That Knocking at My Door.

=== Other work ===
Throughout her life, Bethune worked with disabled students. She herself was diagnosed with scoliosis at age 11, and hip dysplasia.

Bethune founded Bethune Theatredanse (now called Theatre Bethune) in 1981, a nonprofit dance and drama company that has toured internationally and performed at the White House.

She founded Dance Outreach, now known as Infinite Dreams, in 1980, which, as of 2012, enrolls about 8,000 disabled children in dance-related activities throughout Southern California.

== Death ==
Bethune was killed in an apparent hit and run crash on February 12, 2012, while she was trying to help an injured opossum in Griffith Park, Los Angeles.

== Filmography ==
1960	Sunrise at Campobello	Anna Roosevelt	
1967	Who's That Knocking at My Door	Girl	
1974	Planet of the Apes	Arn	TV series, S1 E5, "The Legacy"
1977	CHiPs	Mother	TV series, S1 E12, "Aweigh We Go"
1985	Walking the Edge	Mrs. Johnson	
1988	The Boost	Dance Teacher / Choreographer	
