= Wayne Rogers =

American actor (1933–2015)

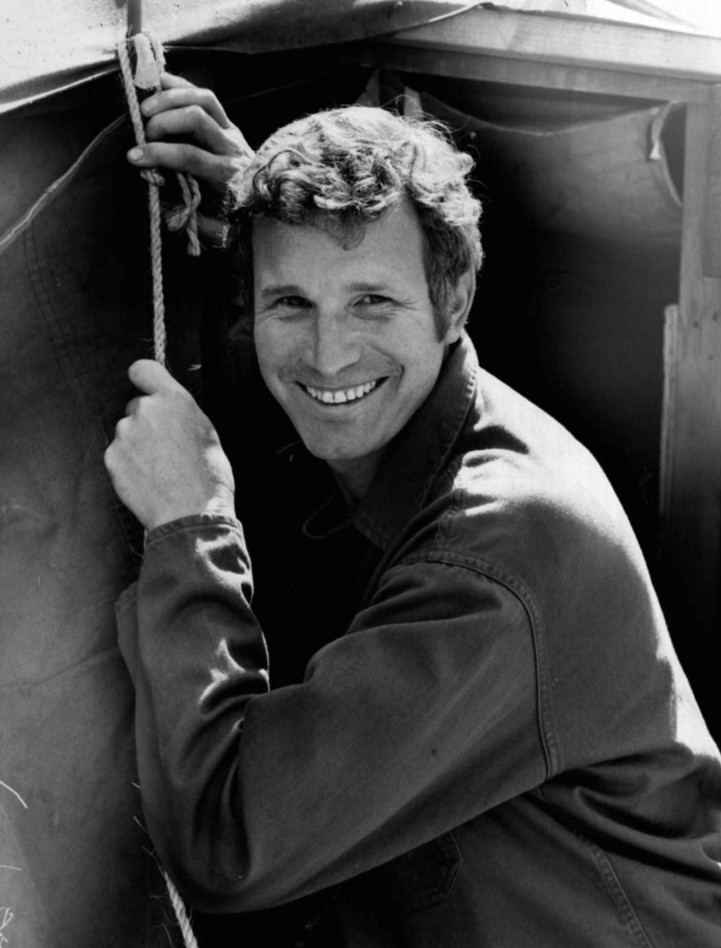
- Rogers as Trapper in M*A*S*H, 1972
- Born: William Wayne McMillan Rogers III; April 7, 1933; Birmingham, Alabama, U.S.
- Died: December 31, 2015 (aged 82); Los Angeles, California, U.S.
- Education: Princeton University, 1954
- Military career
- Allegiance: United States
- Branch: United States Navy
- Service years: 1954–1956
- Rank: Ensign
- Units: USS Denebola, navigator
- Conflicts: Cold War
- Occupations: Actor; investor; television personality
- Years active: 1959–2014
- Spouses: Mitzi McWhorter (m. 1960; div. 1983); Amy Hirsh (m. 1988)
- Children: 2

William Wayne McMillan Rogers III (April 7, 1933 – December 31, 2015) was an American actor, known for playing the roles of Captain "Trapper" John McIntyre in the CBS television series M*A*S*H and of Dr. Charley Michaels on House Calls (1979–1982).

He was a regular panel member on the Fox News Channel stock investment television program Cashin' In as a result of having built a career as an investor, investment strategist, adviser, and money manager.

== Early life ==
Born in Birmingham, Alabama, Rogers attended Ramsay High School in Birmingham and was a graduate of the Webb School in Bell Buckle, Tennessee. He earned a history degree from Princeton University in 1954. He was a member of the Princeton Triangle Club and the eating club Tiger Inn. While at Princeton, Rogers' roommate was Louis Rukeyser, who would later become a noted financial journalist and host of Wall Street Week. After college, Rogers served as an officer in the United States Navy, as a navigator on the USS Denebola, and planned to enter Harvard Law School before he became an actor.

== Career ==
=== Early career ===
Rogers appeared on television in both dramas and sitcoms such as The Invaders, The F.B.I., Combat!, Gunsmoke, Have Gun – Will Travel, Wanted Dead or Alive, Gomer Pyle, U.S.M.C., and The Fugitive, and had a small supporting role in the 1967 movie Cool Hand Luke. He also appeared on The Big Valley in 1968.

He played Slim Davis on the soap opera Search for Tomorrow in 1959. He also played a role in Odds Against Tomorrow, which was nominated for a Golden Globe Award in 1960 as Best Film Promoting International Understanding. He guest starred on an episode of the CBS western Johnny Ringo.

Rogers co-starred with Robert Bray and Richard Eyer in the western series Stagecoach West on ABC from 1960 to 1961.

Rogers was cast as U.S. Army Lieutenant Richard Henry Pratt in 1965 in Death Valley Days.

He appeared on the Cannon episode "Call Unicorn" in 1971.

=== M*A*S*H (1972–1975) ===
When Rogers was approached for M*A*S*H, he planned to audition for the role of Hawkeye Pierce. He found the character too cynical, however, and asked to screen test as Trapper John, whose outlook was brighter. Rogers was told that Trapper and Hawkeye would have equal importance as characters. That changed after Alan Alda, whose acting career and résumé up to that point had outshone that of Rogers, was cast as Hawkeye and proved to be more popular with the audience. Rogers enjoyed working with Alda and the rest of the cast as a whole (Alda and Rogers quickly became close friends), but eventually chafed that the writers were devoting the show's best humorous and dramatic moments to Alda.

When the writers took the liberty of making Hawkeye a thoracic surgeon in the episode "Dear Dad" (December 17, 1972), even though Trapper was the unit's only thoracic surgeon in the movie and the novel, Rogers felt Trapper had been stripped of his credentials. He decided to leave the show between production of the third and fourth seasons, making his last on-screen appearance in the episode Abyssinia, Henry, which was also the final episode for fellow cast member McLean Stevenson who had portrayed Lieutenant Colonel Henry Blake.

On the M*A*S*H 30th Anniversary Reunion Television Special aired by Fox-TV in 2002, Rogers spoke on the differences between the Hawkeye and Trapper characters, saying, "Alan [Alda] and I both used to discuss ways on how to distinguish the differences between the two characters as to where there would be a variance.... My character [Trapper John McIntyre] was a little more impulsive [than Hawkeye]." Rogers considerably reduced his Alabama accent for the character of Trapper.

He succeeded Elliott Gould, who had played the character in the Robert Altman movie MASH, and was himself succeeded by Pernell Roberts on the M*A*S*H spin-off Trapper John, M.D..

=== Post-M*A*S*H work ===
After leaving M*A*S*H, Rogers appeared as an FBI agent in the 1975 NBC-TV movie Attack on Terror: The FBI vs. the Ku Klux Klan, as Michael Stone in the 1980 miniseries Top of the Hill, and as civil rights attorney Morris Dees in 1996's Ghosts of Mississippi. He also starred in the short-lived 1976 period detective series City of Angels and the 1979–1982 CBS series House Calls, first with Lynn Redgrave (both were nominated for Golden Globes in 1981, as best actor and best actress in TV comedy, but did not win) and then later with actress Sharon Gless. Rogers also appeared in the 1980s miniseries Chiefs.

Rogers then was a guest star five times in a recurring role on CBS's Murder, She Wrote. He has served as an executive producer and producer in both television and film, and as a screenwriter, and a director.

Rogers also starred in several other movies. In 1981, he played the role of an art forger in Roger Vadim's The Hot Touch. Then, in the movie The Gig (1985), alongside Cleavon Little, he was a jazz musician-hobbyist whose group has an opportunity to play a Catskills resort and must confront failure. Also in 1985, he starred opposite Barbara Eden in the televised reunion movie I Dream of Jeannie... Fifteen Years Later based on the 1960s situation comedy I Dream of Jeannie. Rogers took on the role of Major Tony Nelson, which was originally portrayed by Larry Hagman in the television series when Hagman was unavailable to reprise the character he had originated. In 1986, Rogers hosted the short-lived CBS television series High Risk. He also starred as Walter Duncan in the 1987 movie Race Against the Harvest. Rogers got the opportunity to show off his southern accent in the 1988 movie, "Bluegrass." He appeared in the film along with costars Cheryl Ladd and Mickey Rooney. In 1990, Rogers co-starred with Connie Selleca in the CBS made-for-television movie Miracle Landing based on the true story of the 1988 Aloha Airlines Flight 243 crash landing after an explosive cabin depressurization.

=== Financial career ===
Rogers began to test the stock and real estate markets during his tenure as a M*A*S*H cast member and became a successful money manager and investor. In 1988 and 1990, he appeared before the United States House Committee on the Judiciary as an expert witness, testifying in favor of retaining the banking laws enacted under the Glass–Steagall Legislation act of 1933. He appeared regularly as a panel member on the Fox Business Network cable TV stocks investment/stocks news program Cashin' In, hosted since 2013 by Fox News anchor Eric Bolling. In August 2006, Rogers was elected to the board of directors of Vishay Intertechnology, Inc., a Fortune 1000 manufacturer of semiconductors and electronic components. He was also the head of Wayne Rogers & Co., a stock trading investment corporation.

On April 23, 2012, Rogers signed as the new spokesman for Senior Home Loans, a direct reverse mortgage lender headquartered in Long Island, New York.

=== Awards ===
Rogers received a star on the Hollywood Walk of Fame in 2005.

== Personal life and death ==
As a young actor, Rogers met actress Mitzi McWhorter in New York in the late 1950s. They married in 1960, had two children, and divorced in 1983. They had been separated for almost four years prior to the divorce. Rogers married his second wife, Amy Hirsh, in 1988.

In 2001, Rogers and his wife moved to Destin, Florida.

Rogers died on December 31, 2015, from complications of pneumonia in Los Angeles at the age of 82.

== Filmography ==
| Year | Show | Role | Notes |
|---|---|---|---|
| 1959 | Zane Grey Theater | Frank Sanders | |
| 1959 | Odds Against Tomorrow | Soldier In Bar | |
| 1959 | Gunsmoke | Tom | Season 5 Episode 14: "False Witness" |
| 1960 | Death Valley Days | George Schmidtlein | Season 8 Episode 36: "Mission to the Mountains" |
| 1960 | The Millionaire | Allan Merrick | Season 6 Episode 17: "The Story of Sylvia Merrick" |
| 1960 | Wanted Dead or Alive | Ash Langford | Season 2 Episode 18: "Angela |
| 1960 | Stagecoach West | Luke Perry | Main cast; 38 Episodes |
| 1962 | Alfred Hitchcock Presents | Kenneth | Season 7 Episode 37: "The Big Kick" |
| 1962 | Gunsmoke | Brack | Season 7 Episode 17: "Cody's Code" |
| 1963 | Have Gun – Will Travel | Daniel | Season 6 Episode 19: "The Debutante" |
| 1964 | Dr. Sex | Raincoat Man | Uncredited |
| 1964 | Gomer Pyle – USMC | Captain | Season 1 Episode 10: "A Date for the Colonel's Daughter" |
| 1965 | Gunsmoke | Stretch Morgan | Season 11 Episode 5: "Taps for Old Jeb" |
| 1965 | Death Valley Days | Lieutenant Richard H. Pratt | Season 13 Episode 24: "The Journey" |
| 1965 | The Glory Guys | Lieutenant Mike Moran | |
| 1965 | Honey West | Jerry, the Photographer (villain) | Season 1 Episode 14: "Invitation to Limbo" |
| 1966 | Chamber of Horrors | Sergeant Jim Albertson | |
| 1966 | Combat! | Reiser | Season 5 Episode 1: "The Gun" |
| 1966 | The Fugitive | Sergeant Fred Bragin | Season 3 Episode 23: "The Chinese Sunset" |
| 1967 | Cool Hand Luke | "Gambler" | |
| 1967 | The Invaders | Lieutenant Matteson | Season 2 Episode 7: "The Spores" |
| 1968 | The Big Valley | Don Jarvis | Season 4 Episode 6: "The Jonah" |
| 1970 | WUSA | Minter | |
| 1971 | Cannon | Steve | Season 1 Episode 3: "Call Unicorn" |
| 1972 | Pocket Money | "Stretch" Russell | |
| 1972–1975 | M*A*S*H | Captain "Trapper" John McIntyre | Main cast; Seasons 1 through 3 |
| 1973 | Barnaby Jones | Gil Atkens | Season 2 Episode 3: "Echo of a Murder" |
| 1975 | Attack on Terror: The FBI vs. the Ku Klux Klan | FBI Special Agent Don Foster | |
| 1976 | City of Angels | Jake Axminster | 13 episodes |
| 1977 | It Happened One Christmas | George Hatch | TV movie |
| 1978 | Once in Paris... | Michael Moore | |
| 1979–1982 | House Calls | Dr. Charley Michaels | 57 episodes |
| 1981 | The Hot Touch | Danny Fairchild | |
| 1983 | Chiefs | Will Henry Lee | TV miniseries |
| 1985 | I Dream of Jeannie... Fifteen Years Later | Colonel Tony Nelson | TV movie |
| 1985 | The Gig | Marty Flynn | |
| 1987 | The Killing Time | Jake Winslow | |
| 1987 | Race Against the Harvest | Walter Duncan | TV Movie |
| 1989 | Passion and Paradise | Raymond Schindler | TV movie |
| 1990 | Miracle Landing | Bob Schornstheimer | TV movie |
| 1993 | The Goodbye Bird | Ray Whitney | |
| 1993 | Murder, She Wrote | Charlie Garrett | Season 9, Episode 13: "Dead Eye" |
| 1994 | Murder, She Wrote | Charlie Garrett | Season 10, Episodes 7 & 14: "Fatal Paradise", "Deadly Assets" |
| 1995 | Murder, She Wrote | Charlie Garrett | Season 12, Episodes 2 & 9: "A Quaking in Aspen", "Deadly Bidding" |
| 1996 | Ghosts of Mississippi | Morris Dees | |
| 1997 | Diagnosis: Murder | Dr. Ken Morrisay | Season 4 Episode 22: "Physician, Murder Thyself" |
| 1999 | Love Lies Bleeding | Inspector Abberline | |
| 2000 | Coo Coo Cafe | | |
| 2001 | Frozen with Fear | Charles Sullivan | |
| 2002 | Three Days of Rain | Business Man | |
| 2003 | Nobody Knows Anything! | Gun Schnook | (final film role) |
