= Lost Flight =

1969 film by Leonard Horn

- Original film poster
- Directed by: Leonard J. Horn
- Written by: Dean Riesner
- Produced by: Frank Price (Executive Producer); Paul Donnelly
- Starring: Lloyd Bridges
- Cinematography: James A. Crabe
- Edited by: Douglas Stewart, Jack W, Schoengarth and Larry Lester
- Music by: Dominic Frontiere
- Production company: Universal City Studios ©1969
- Distributed by: Universal Pictures; National Broadcasting Company (NBC)
- Release dates: July 1, 1970 (U.S. theatrical); January 7, 1972 (NBC original broadcast)
- Running time: 104 min.
- Country: United States
- Language: English

Lost Flight is a 1969 dramatic film written and produced for television based on producer Frank Price's unsuccessful 1966 TV pilot, Stranded, that instead had a theatrical release in the US and Australia from mid-1970 through 1971. The plot resembles that of later disaster genre films and approximates an adult version of Lord of the Flies.

== Plot ==
Captain Steve Bannerman (Lloyd Bridges) has been asked to fly one last passenger flight from Hawaii to Australia for Trans-Pacific Airlines. During a violent thunderstorm, he crashes the jet airliner on an uninhabited South Pacific island. Bannerman takes charge of the survivors and teams with Merle Barnaby (Billy Dee Williams), a black marine returning from combat duty in Vietnam, to try to find a way to survive on the island.

Among the surviving passengers and crew, they have the support of Gina Talbot (Anne Francis) and Beejay Caldwell (Jennifer Leak) but oil magnate Glenn Walkup (Ralph Meeker), nightclub entertainer Eddie Randolph (Bobby Van) and Jonesy (Andrew Prine) begin to cause trouble.

In the midst of a power struggle, the captain has to contend with not only helping his crew and passengers survive but also dealing with a number of desperate and irrational passengers. Complicating matters is 10-year-old Charlie (Michael-James Wixted), who is suffering from acute appendicitis, and a pregnant woman.

When Bannerman rejects Walkup's idea of setting out in a raft as unsafe, he is brutally beaten. Randolph and two associates set out in the raft, but to no avail. Later on, a radio bulletin announces the cancellation of all rescue attempts for the surviving passengers and crew.

After watching Beejey bathe near a waterfall, Jonesy pursues her. Beejay falls from a cliff in an attempt to get away from Jonesy. Unbeknownst to Beejay and Jonesy, Barnaby heard the former's screams. To take the blame off of himself, Jonesy decides to accuse Barnaby of killing Beejay. A lynch mob is formed and Jonesy subsequently shoots Barnaby.

Before Jonesy could shoot Barnaby a second time, Bannerman and many of the passengers put themselves between Barnaby and the lynch mob. Gina soon announces that Beejay survived the fall and identified Jonesy as her attacker. Jonesy tries to escape into the jungle but is accidentally impaled by a boar trap that Barnaby had set up. When the pregnant woman gives birth to a baby later that day, the survivors unite to create a new society.

== Cast ==
- Lloyd Bridges as Captain Steve Bannerman
- Bobby Van as Eddie Randolph
- Anne Francis as Gina Talbot
- Ralph Meeker as Glenn Walkup
- Andrew Prine as Jonesy
- Linden Chiles as Allen Bedecker
- Michael Larrain as Francis Delaney
- Billy Dee Williams as Merle Barnaby
- Michael-James Wixted as Charlie Burnett
- Nobu McCarthy as Zora Lewin
- Jennifer Leak as Bee Jay Caldwell
- Kasey Rogers as Mrs. Peterson
- Joseph Bernard as Mr. Peterson
- Paul Comi as Joe Turley
- Dallas Mitchell as Dave Nathan
- William Mims as Fat Man
- Edward Faulkner as Hansen
- Georgene Barnes as Mary Ann McGee
- Dee Carroll as Mrs. Carroll
- Albert Popwell as Black Militant
- Gil Perkins as Australian
- Connie Kreski as Australian's Wife

== Production ==
Producer Frank Price originally came up with the idea of stranded passengers on a deserted island in 1966, naming his proposed TV series Stranded. When that project failed to attract much interest, it was put on hold with a new two-hour pilot movie later hatched in 1968 that resulted in Lost Flight. The pilot film was ordered by CBS but did not lead to a series, and the film did not air in 1969 as originally planned. Instead, Universal released it to theaters on July 1, 1970, and it ran alongside other Universal films such as "Airport," "Colossus: The Forbin Project," and "The Andromeda Strain" through much of 1971. The film did not get its first telecast until NBC ran it as a Friday night world premiere on January 7, 1972.

Capt. J.S. Solomon from Trans World Airlines (TWA) was the technical advisor on the film. A Boeing 707-138B N790SA on lease from Standard Airways served as the airliner in the film painted in the fictional Trans-Pacific livery. Location shooting at Honolulu Airport in Hawaii showed the movie stand-in being fueled and loaded while surrounded by JAL and United DC-8s and Pan American 707s. Most of the principal photography dealing with the stranded passengers and crew was filmed on Kauai.

On November 23, 1968, the last day of shooting, Billy Dee Williams married model and actress Marlene Clark on the set in Kauai. The couple wanted to get married right away, and since the company was due to wrap production and return to Honolulu at the end of the day that Saturday, Producer Paul Donnelly decided to spring into action and make the wedding happen. He ordered loads of flowers, secured a white lace mini wedding gown for the bride, and even found a bible for them in one of the survival kits supplied with the various life rafts used in the film. As the Rev. Harold Starks of Kauai was serving as an extra in the film, he volunteered to officiate. Hanalei Plantation musicians performed the wedding march, and the ceremony was performed in Haena Dry Cave on the island of Kauai (which served as the primary shelter for the story's characters throughout the latter half of the film) with Lloyd Bridges serving as best man, actress Nina Seaton as maid of honor, and Paul Donnelly giving the bride away.

== Reception ==
Destined for mainly television broadcast in 1969 on NBC, Lost Flight was re-broadcast in dubbed versions in Brazil, France and West Germany. The film also had a limited release on the U.S. Armed Forces overseas movie theater circuit. Despite the limited theatrical release of Lost Flight in Australia in 1970, the 1971 New York release, bundled with then current One More Train to Rob (1971) triggered a review in The New York Times by Roger Greenspun, who noted that the similarities to other "lost" genre films in that the "concept about a group of people lost on an uncharted island who are forced to carve out their own civilization..." approximates other efforts. His further critical review effused over a "lost" gem, "...it is a reasonably entertaining, well-paced, technically ambitious movie that receives great assistance from its performers—notably Lloyd Bridges (the pilot) for good, Ralph Meeker (the businessman) for evil, and Anne Francis (the mistress) for marriage and the family."
