= The Doll Squad =

1973 film by Ted V. Mikels

- Original film poster
- Directed by: Ted V. Mikels
- Screenplay by: Jack Richesin; Pam Eddy; Ted V. Mikels
- Produced by: Ted V. Mikels; Paul Burkett
- Starring: Michael Ansara; Francine York; Anthony Eisley; John Carter; Tura Satana
- Cinematography: Anthony Salinas
- Edited by: Ted V. Mikels
- Music by: Nicholas Carras
- Distributed by: Feature-Faire Productions
- Release date: September 19, 1973
- Running time: 101 minutes
- Country: United States
- Language: English

The Doll Squad is a 1973 low-budget Z-grade action film by Feature-Faire that was later re-released under the title Seduce and Destroy. Directed, edited, co-written and co-produced by Ted V. Mikels, it features Francine York, Michael Ansara, John Carter, Anthony Eisley, Leigh Christian and Tura Satana. Mikels claimed he filmed it for a total cost of $256,000.

== Plot ==
CIA operative Connolly assigns Sabrina, the leader of a group of five shapely female operatives individually selected by a computer. Code named the Doll Squad, they thwart the efforts of a madman who formerly worked alongside Sabrina as a fellow CIA agent who has become an entrepreneur to overthrow world governments. His plan is to release rats infected with bubonic plague.

== Cast ==
=== Members of "The Doll Squad" ===
- Jean London as Kim Luval
- Leigh Christian as Sharon O'Connor
- Sherri Vernon as Cat
- Bret Zeller as Cherisse
- Carol Terry as Carol Peirce
- Tura Satana as Lavelle Sumara
- Judith McConnell as Elizabeth White

=== Others ===
- Michael Ansara as Eamon O'Reilly
- Francine York as Sabrina Kincaid
- Anthony Eisley as Victor Connelly
- John Carter as Senator Stockwell
- Lisa Todd as Maria
- Rafael Campos as Rafael
- Lillian Garrett as Nancy Malone
- William Bagdad as Joseph
- Herb Robins as Munson
- Curt Matson as Captain Curran
- Christopher Augustine
- Bertil Unger as Mr. Cahaymen
- Gustaf Unger as Dr. Cahaymen
- Richard Reed
- William Bonano

== Production ==
Mikels said the script was brought to him by Pam Eddy and Jack Richesin: "It was three kind of naughty girls of the night getting together to take vengeance against somebody that did something to them. It evolved deeper and deeper, I did two or three re-writes on it, and finally the wife of Joseph Robertson did the final draft". Mikels said that Mary Martin and Sissy Spacek came in for parts but the roles had already been cast: "I'm very pleased with everybody I had in it though. That turned out to be a forerunner of female power films".

Time Inc. contributor Ed White notes that the visuals for the action sequences near the end of the film are unusually dark. This part of the film was shot in a single night. The multiple submachine guns used by the actresses in this sequence were really a single weapon that was on temporarily loan to the director.

== Reception ==
DVD reviewer and Rolling Stone contributor Doug Pratt called it "an enjoyable action romp". He adds, "the girls kick some serious butt and they look terrific in their hot black jumpsuits. Who can resist?" Film critic Michael Adams said the film is "so slow in parts I think it should be called The Dull Squad", but "it picks up at the end". He rated it a solid 37/100. Nonetheless, it has become something of a cult film for fans of actress Francine York.

=== Influence ===
This film may have been the inspiration for the Charlie's Angels television series. Aaron Spelling, who later produced the television series, and at the time was executive producer of Mod Squad, was invited to the premiere of this film, and the lead member of the squad was named Sabrina, just as in Charlie's Angels. Quentin Tarantino said the women in the film have a similar look to his Deadly Viper Assassination Squad in his film Kill Bill.

== See also ==
- List of American films of 1973
