= Jennifer Leak =

Canadian actress (1947–2024)

- Born: September 28, 1947; Cardiff, Wales, UK
- Died: March 18, 2024 (aged 76); Jupiter, Florida, U.S.
- Other name: Jennifer Leak D'Auria
- Occupation: Actress
- Years active: 1964–1986
- Known for: Yours, Mine and Ours; Eye of the Cat
- Spouse(s): Tim Matheson (m. 1968; div. 1971) James D'Auria (m. 1977)

Jennifer Mary Leak (September 28, 1947 – March 18, 2024) was a Canadian film and television actress, best known for her role as Colleen North in the 1968 film Yours, Mine and Ours.

== Early life ==
Leak was born on September 28, 1947, in Cardiff, Wales. Throughout her childhood, she grew up in various places, including Hertfordshire, England; Nova Scotia, Canada; Jerusalem; and Toronto. She began her career in Canada at the age of 17 after she appeared in the pilot of the Canadian television series Wojeck. Leak later moved to Los Angeles, and within a few months, she was cast as Lucille Ball's daughter in the 1968 feature Yours, Mine and Ours. On that set, Leak met her first husband, Tim Matheson.

== Career ==
Leak played the role of Olive Springer Gordon Randolph in the soap opera Another World (1976–1979), and Blanche Bouvier in Guiding Light (1981–82). In addition, Leak created the role of Gwen Sherman, who started out as a prostitute who fell in love with Greg Foster and ended up becoming a nun in the mid-1970s on the CBS program The Young and the Restless.

Leak also played guest spots on various television shows, including McMillan and Wife and Hawaii Five-O. In 1973, she played Erica Jordan, Mary's temporary replacement at WJM-TV, in the season four episode "Better Late...That's a Pun...Than Never" in The Mary Tyler Moore Show.

== Personal life and death ==
Leak was married to Tim Matheson from 1968 to 1971. She was later married to James D'Auria. Leak died in Jupiter, Florida on March 18, 2024, at the age of 76, after suffering with progressive supranuclear palsy for seven years.

== Filmography ==
=== Film ===
| Year | Title | Role | Notes |
|---|---|---|---|
| 1968 | Yours, Mine and Ours | Colleen North | |
| 1969 | Eye of the Cat | Poor Dear | |
| 1974 | The Photographer | Elowise Atkins | |
| 1981 | The Incubus | Deena Ferrin | |
| 1985 | Agent on Ice | Helen Pope | |

=== Television ===
| Year | Title | Role | Notes |
|---|---|---|---|
| 1966 | Wojeck | Gale Fletcher | 2 episodes |
| 1969 | The Good Guys | Suzi | Episode: "Take a Computer to Lunch" |
| 1969 | Hawaii Five-O | Diana Cole | Episode: "King Kamehameha Blues" |
| 1970 | Lost Flight | Beejay Caldwell | Television film |
| 1972 | The Delphi Bureau | Judy Rogers | Episode: "The Top Secret Secret Project" |
| 1973 | A Time for Love | Patricia | Television film |
| 1973 | McMillan & Wife | Nell | Episode: "Death of a Monster... Birth of a Legend" |
| 1973 | The Rookies | Sister Anne | Episode: "Prayers Unanswered, Prayers Unheard" |
| 1974 | The Mary Tyler Moore Show | Erica Jordan | Episode: "Better Late... That's a Pun... Than Never" |
| 1974 | Ironside | Judith MacDane | Episode: "A Death in Academe" |
| 1975 | Ryan's Hope | Nurse Klupper | Episode #1.44 |
| 1976–1979 | Another World | Olive Randolph | 6 episodes |
| 1981 | Nero Wolfe | Elizabeth Marsh | Episode: "Murder by the Book" |
| 1981 | Guiding Light | Blanche Bouvier | Episode dated 31 July 1981 |
| 1986 | One Life to Live | Matron Spitz | Episode dated 26 September 1986 |
| 1992 | Loving | Dr. Hennessy | 2 episodes |
