= Tura Satana =

American actress (1938–2011)

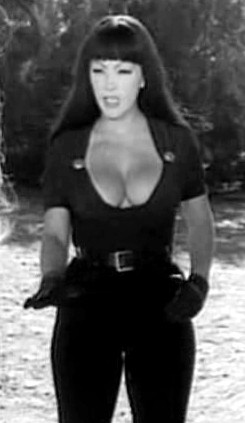
- Satana in Faster, Pussycat! Kill! Kill! (1965)
- Born: Tura Barretto Pascual; July 10, 1938; Chicago, Illinois, U.S.
- Died: February 4, 2011 (aged 72); Reno, Nevada, U.S.
- Occupation: Actress
- Years active: 1963–2011
- Spouses: John Satana (m. 1951–1952) Endel Jurman (m. 1981–2000)
- Children: 2
- Website: turasatana.com

Tura Satana (July 10, 1938 – February 4, 2011) was a Filipino-American actress, showgirl, and exotic dancer. Among her 13 film and television credits are the exploitation film Faster, Pussycat! Kill! Kill! (1965) and the science fiction horror film The Astro-Zombies (1968).

== Early life ==
Census records list Satana as being born Tura Barretto Pascual in Chicago, Illinois, U.S. Her father was Diosdado Pascual, a Filipino immigrant, and her mother was Hortense Miller, a woman from St. Louis, Missouri. Throughout her entire career, she would claim to have been born in Hokkaidō and that she was of mixed Japanese heritage, with her father being a Japanese silent movie actor of part-Filipino descent, and her mother a circus performer of White and Native American descent. This narrative gave her birth name as Tura Luna Pascual Yamaguchi and was repeated in several obituaries.

Walking home from school just before her 10th birthday, she was reportedly gang raped by five teenagers. According to Satana, her attackers were never prosecuted, and it was rumored that the judge had been paid off. She reports that this prompted her to learn martial arts, such as aikido and karate. Over the next 15 years, Satana tracked down each rapist and exacted revenge. "I made a vow to myself that I would someday, somehow get even with all of them," she said years later. "They never knew who I was until I told them." Around this time, she formed a gang, "The Angeles," with Italian, Jewish, and Polish girls from her neighborhood. In an interview with Psychotronic Video, Satana said, "We had leather motorcycle jackets, jeans, and boots and we kicked butt." Because of frequent delinquency, she was sent to reform school. When she was 13, her parents arranged her marriage to 17-year-old John Satana in Hernando, Mississippi, which lasted nine months.

Satana moved to Los Angeles and by age 15, using fake identification to hide the fact she was a minor, began burlesque dancing. She was hired to perform at the Trocadero nightclub on the Sunset Strip and became a photographic model for silent screen comic Harold Lloyd, whose photos of her appear in Harold Lloyd's Hollywood Nudes in 3-D.

Satana returned to Chicago to live with her parents and started dancing at the Club Rendevouz in Calumet City, where she was known as Galatea, the "Statue that Came to Life." She claimed that after singer Elvis Presley saw Satana perform at Chicago's Follies Theater, the two began a romantic relationship that some reports say ended in a marriage proposal she declined. Satana eventually became a successful exotic dancer, traveling from city to city. She credited Lloyd with giving her the confidence to pursue a career in show business: "I saw myself as an ugly child. Mr. Lloyd said, 'You have such a symmetrical face. The camera loves your face...You should be seen.'"

== Acting career ==
Satana's acting debut role was a cameo as Suzette Wong, a Parisian prostitute in the film Irma la Douce, which starred Jack Lemmon and Shirley MacLaine. Her next was as a dancer in Who's Been Sleeping in My Bed? (1963), starring Dean Martin and Elizabeth Montgomery. Soon after, Satana appeared in the television shows Burke's Law (1964) and The Man from U.N.C.L.E. (1964).

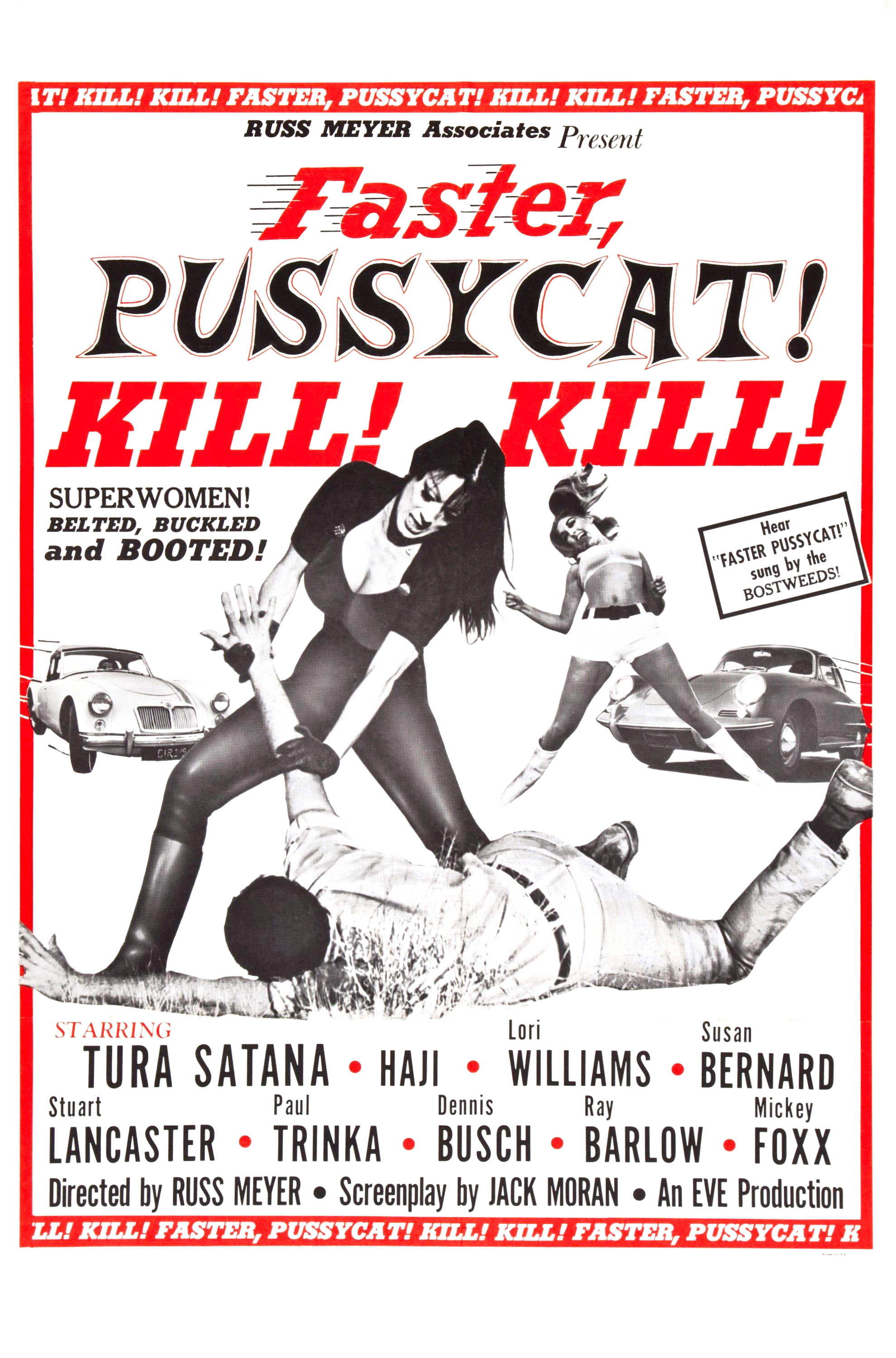
Poster for Faster, Pussycat! Kill! Kill!.

Satana then starred as "Varla" in the 1965 film Faster, Pussycat! Kill! Kill!—a very aggressive and sexual female character. She did all of her own stunts and fight scenes. Renowned film critic Richard Corliss called her performance "the most honest, maybe the one honest portrayal in the Meyer canon and certainly the scariest." Originally titled The Leather Girls, the film is an ode to female violence, based on a concept created by Russ Meyer and screenwriter Jack Moran. Both felt at her first audition that Satana was "definitely Varla." The film was shot on location in the desert outside Los Angeles during days when the weather was more than 100 degrees Fahrenheit and freezing nights, with Satana clashing regularly with teenage co-star Susan Bernard due to Bernard's mother's reportedly disruptive behavior on the set. Meyer said Satana was "extremely capable. She knew how to handle herself. Don't fuck with her! And if you have to fuck her, do it well! She might turn on you!"

Satana was responsible for adding key elements to the visual style and energy of the production, including her costume, makeup, usage of martial arts, dialogue, and the use of spinning tires in the death scene of the main male character. She came up with many of the movie's best lines. At one point in the film, the gas station attendant was ogling her cleavage while confessing to a desire to see America. Varla replied, "You won't find it down there, Columbus!" Meyer cited her as the primary reason for the film's lasting fame. "She and I made the movie", he said. Meyer reportedly later regretted not using Satana in subsequent productions. Filmink argued she should have become a greater star.

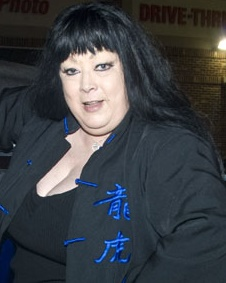
Tura Satana in 2008

After Faster, Pussycat! Kill! Kill!, Satana primarily worked with film director Ted V. Mikels in such films as The Astro-Zombies (1968) and The Doll Squad (1973). After filming The Doll Squad in 1973, Satana was shot by a former lover. She later found employment in a hospital, a position she kept for four years—she had studied nursing at Firmin Desloge Hospital. She also worked briefly as a dispatcher, later got injured in a serious car accident, and would spend the next two years in and out of hospitals, having two major operations and approximately fifteen others.

In 2002 she returned to acting, reprising the role of Malvina Satana in Mark of the Astro Zombies (2002), the sequel to The Astro Zombies.

== Personal life ==
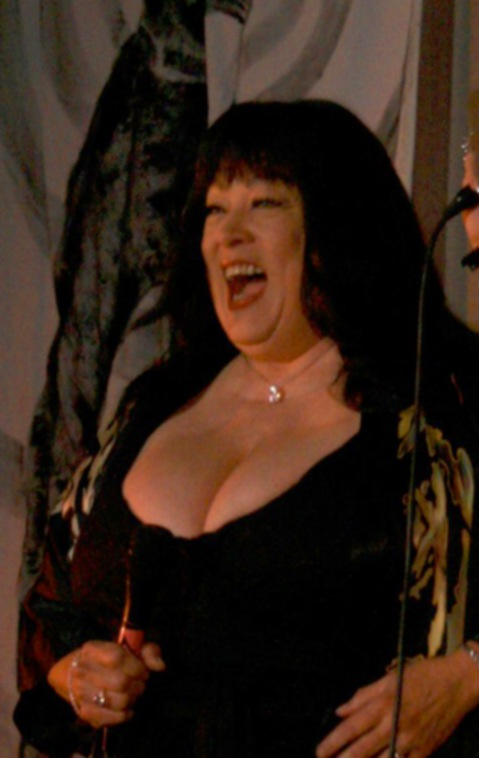
Tura Satana in 2007.

Satana claimed to have dated Elvis Presley but turned down his marriage proposal, although she kept the ring. For years her daughter Kalani believed her birth father was singer Tony Bennett, but DNA testing revealed the father was actually comedian Marty Allen.

== Death ==
Satana died on February 4, 2011, in Reno, Nevada, and was survived by her daughters, Kalani and Jade, and her sisters, Pamela and Kim. Her long-time manager, Siouxzan Perry, gave the cause of death as heart failure.

== Selected filmography ==
- Irma la Douce (1963) – Suzette Wong
- Who's Been Sleeping in My Bed? (1963) – Stripper (uncredited)
- Faster, Pussycat! Kill! Kill! (1965) – Varla
- Our Man Flint (1966) – Stripper (uncredited)
- The Astro-Zombies (1968) – Satana
- The Doll Squad (1973) – Lavelle Sumara
- Mark of the Astro-Zombies (2002) – Malvira Satana
- The Wild World of Ted V. Mikels (2008) – Herself
- Sugar Boxx (2009) – Judge #1
- The Haunted World of El Superbeasto (2009) – Varla (voice)
- Astro Zombies: M3 – Cloned (2010) – Malvina (final film role)
