= One Shocking Moment =

1965 film

One Shocking Moment is a 1965 American film written and directed by Ted V. Mikels. It was his third feature as director and was a sexploitation film.

== Plot ==
A young newlywed couple move to the city and get involved in the fast life.

== Cast ==
- Gary Kent (as Phillip Brady) as Cliff
- Lee Anna as Mindy
- Verné Martine as Tanya
- Maureen Gaffney as Joanie
- Jerry Fitzpatrick as Rick
- Victor Izay (as Victor Sandor) as D.G. Brenner

== Production ==
The film was made under the title A Suburban Affair. Mikels made it for a theatre in Phoenix and says the film "set some records where it played". The movie is one of the few in Mikels career to feature nudity and sex scenes. “I grew up with a sense of morality," he later said. "I grew up a Catholic. I didn’t want to put sex in my films."
