= Mark Herron =

American actor

- Born: Truman Herron; July 8, 1928; Baxter, Tennessee, U.S.
- Died: January 13, 1996 (aged 67); Los Angeles, California, U.S.
- Occupation: Actor
- Years active: 1951–1996
- Spouse: Judy Garland (m. 1965; div. 1969)
- Partner: Henry Brandon (1969–1990; his death)

Truman "Mark" Herron (July 8, 1928 – January 13, 1996) was an American actor and the fourth husband of singer and actress Judy Garland.

== Career ==
Herron appeared in films such as Federico Fellini's 8½ (1963), Girl in Gold Boots (1968) and Eye of the Cat (1969). He also appeared on the TV western series Gunsmoke in 1960 as an Army Major in the S5E38's "The Deserter".

== Personal life ==
Herron and Judy Garland were married on November 14, 1965, in Las Vegas, Nevada, but they separated after five months of marriage. Seventeen months later, Garland was granted a divorce after testifying that Herron had beaten her. He said he had "only hit her in self-defense."

Gerald Clarke, in his biography of Garland, Get Happy, and in an interview about the book, reported that Herron had an affair with Tallulah Bankhead, prior to meeting Garland.

Garland put Herron to work as producer of her two London Palladium concerts with her daughter Liza Minnelli in 1964, as well as some appearances in Canada in 1965.

Aside from providing Gerold Frank information for his 1975 biography Judy, Herron remained silent on the topic of Garland. He continued acting, often appearing in summer stock productions.

Herron had a long-lasting relationship with fellow actor Henry Brandon, which was only briefly interrupted by his marriage to Garland. The two men remained together until Brandon's death in 1990.

== Filmography ==
Year	Title	Role	Notes
1953	Carbine Williams	Courtroom Spectator	Uncredited
1963	8½	Il corteggiatore di Luisa	
1968	Girl in Gold Boots	Leo McCabe	
1969	Eye of the Cat	Bellemonde	
