= Henry Hensche =

American painter (1899–1992)

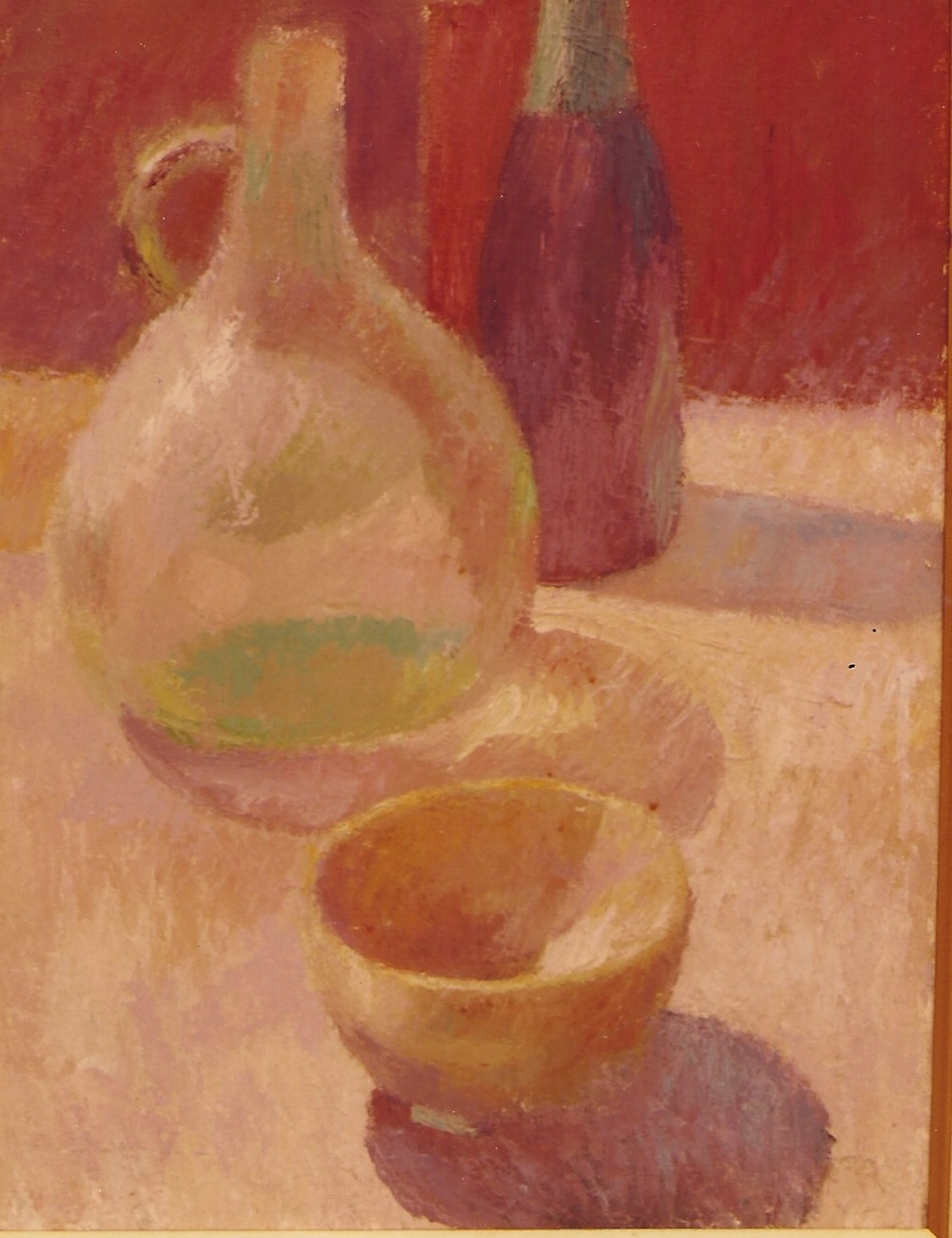
An example of a still life by Hensche

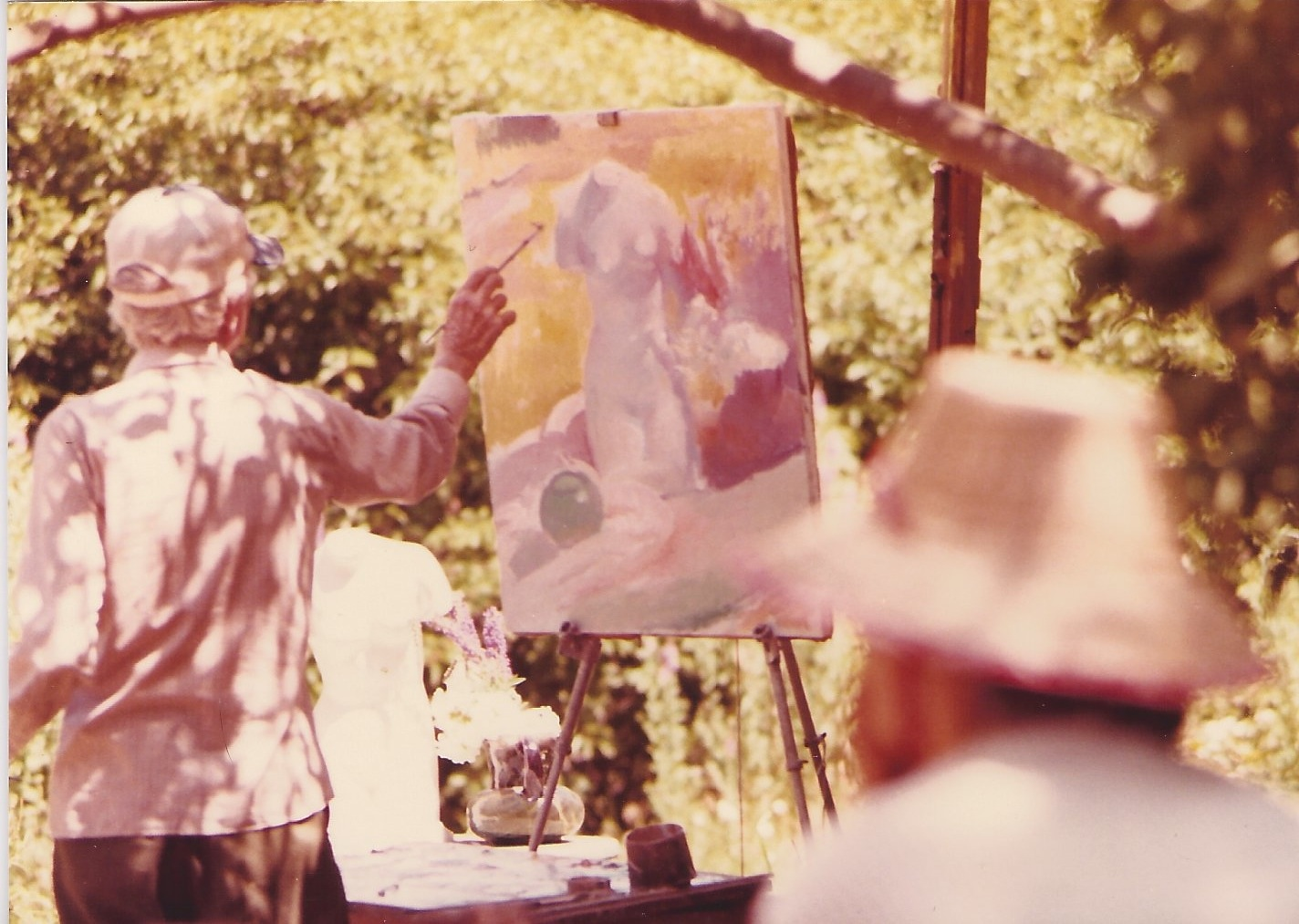
Hensche conducting a painting demonstration

Henry Hensche (February 25, 1899 – December 10, 1992) was an American painter and teacher.

== Early years ==
Born Heinrich Hensche, in Gelsenkirchen, Germany, Henry came to the United States by way of Antwerp, Belgium. He is listed on the ship's manifest as age 11 years old when he arrived at Ellis Island aboard the British steamship S.S. Kroonland on March 3, 1909, with his sister Erna, and his father Fritz (later changed to Fred). (Hensche's birth year is often mentioned as 1898, 1899, or 1901, most likely 1898 - he did not make an effort to correct this. At times his city of birth is cited as Chicago, year of birth 1901 - again, Hensche made no effort to discourage that date or place of birth, perhaps due to anti-German sentiment during the World Wars). His mother is thought to have died before he was two, although this is not verified. She was either unable (deceased) or unwilling to travel to America with the family.

== Training ==
At the age of 17 Hensche began to work in the stockyards. He aspired to work with Frank Lloyd Wright, the famous architect who was active in Chicago, but several of Hensche's teachers encouraged him to apply to the Art Institute of Chicago. Hensche applied and, "I was surprised that they did take me...and that was my start in the painting world...[.]" Hensche studied the old masters and their techniques, but was drawn to the work of the Impressionists which were on exhibit. Several students at the Institute had previously studied with Charles Webster Hawthorne at the Cape Cod School of Art. Hensche admired their techniques with color and decided to leave the Institute (which was not an easy decision) and travel to Provincetown, Massachusetts. By the spring of 1919 he had made it to the Art Students League in New York City and took classes with, among others, George Bellows.

By the summer of 1919, Hensche arrived in Provincetown. There he met Charles W. Hawthorne, who became his mentor. Hensche found in Hawthorne the "bright and savage colors" that he had first seen back at the Art Institute of Chicago. Hensche appreciated and embraced the Hawthorne "color note" approach to painting. He saw this as the advancement from Monet that it was. "Monet was a painter; he didn't teach. What was needed was a way to put his principles into some kind of teachable form...in the America of that day, William Merritt Chase was the most famous teacher. He taught Hawthorne - and almost everyone else. But, he never really came to grips with the Impressionists idea. His paintings were really done in tone - in black and white - with Impressionists colors added. He never developed a clear method."

He also studied at the National Academy Museum and School of Fine Arts and the Beaux-Arts Institute of Design. While Hensche did study with others, Charles Hawthorne was his greatest influence.

== School ==
After the death of Charles Hawthorne, Hensche began to teach on his own in Provincetown. It is widely believed that Hawthorne "passed the mantle" to Hensche, though this may not be the case. In fact, several of Hawthorne's students started schools of their own. (Mrs. Hawthorne wanted $500.00 for the name of the school and Hensche was either unable or unwilling to pay that much. He changed the name to the Cape School of Art and began teaching). It is worth noting that Hensche's Cape School was the only one of these schools to survive for any significant length of time (well over fifty years).

Hensche's work as both a painter and teacher was to advance the ideals of color as the basis for painting, as opposed to tonal painting. He was most interested in creating visual poetry in the tradition of Claude Monet, while advancing that art movement—the true progression of the art of painting, in Hensche's eyes. Hensche was at times a vocal dissident of the many art movements of the 20th Century.

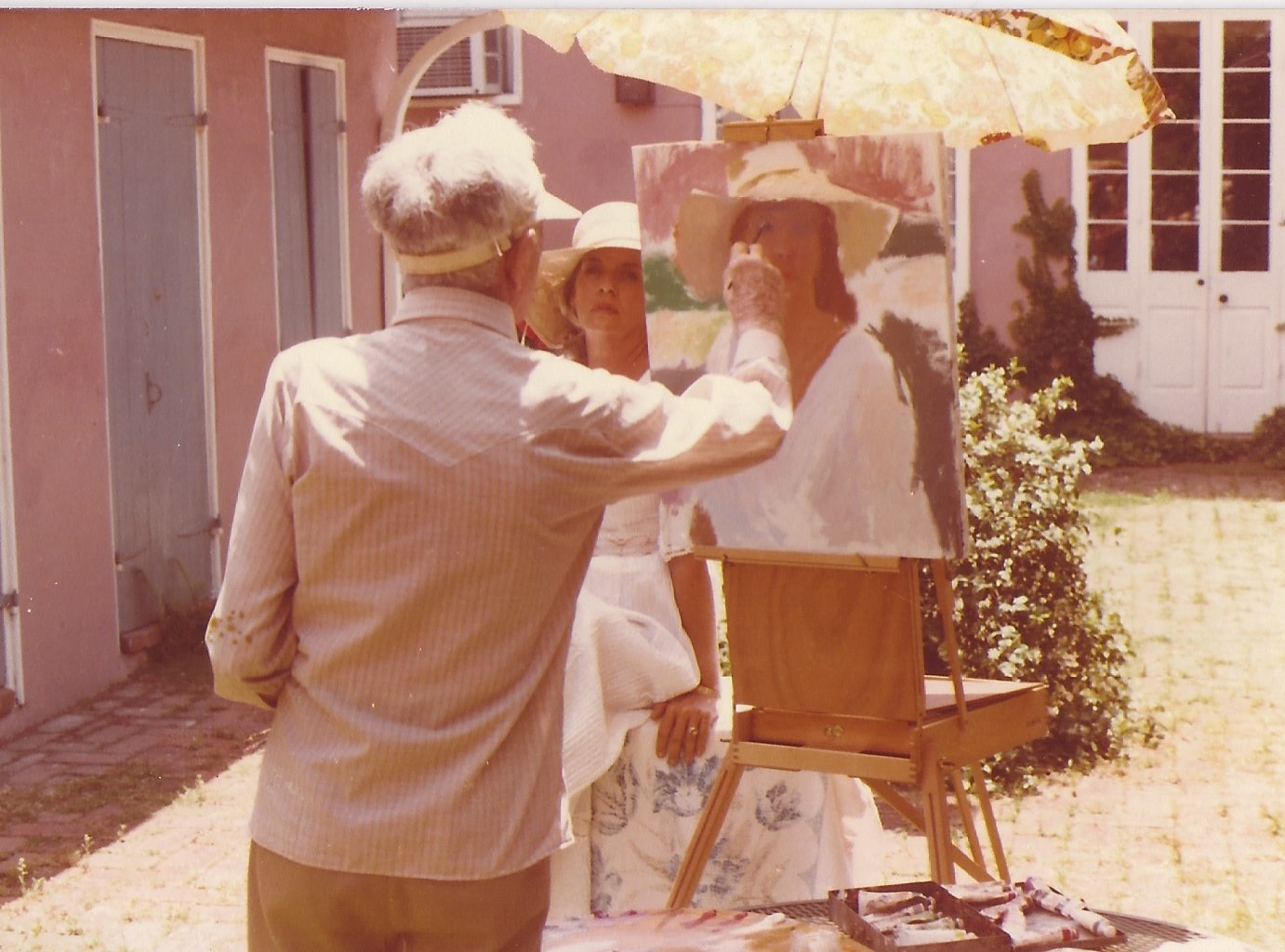
Hensche painting in the French Quarter, circa 1975

== Personal life ==
Hensche married fellow artist Ada Rayner, an English immigrant who had worked as a governess when she first arrived in America. They married in 1936 and maintained a home in Provincetown until their deaths (she in 1985, he in 1992). Following her death. Hensche relocated to Gray, Louisiana. He married Dorothy Billiu, a former student and art teacher. At this time, they both taught at "Studio One," teaching through demonstrations and studio work. Hensche died in 1992, Billiu-Hensche in 2002.

== The Cape School revisited ==
In 2010, former students John Clayton, John Ebersberger, Cedric Egeli, Rob Longley, and Hilda Neily founded the Cape School of Art in Provincetown, in an effort to pass along Henry Hensche's teachings. John Ebersberger also teaches at Maryland Hall for the Creative Arts in Annapolis, Maryland, and l'Atelier aux Couleurs in California. Another of Hensche's students was Betty Warren, who founded her own art school at Malden Bridge, in Upstate New York.

Camille Przewodek and her husband, Dale Axelrod, also studied with Henry Hensche for more than six years and had an Atelier in Petaluma, California where they taught studio and plein air workshops on color perception and direct painting using the techniques and exercises of Henry Hensche until Przewodeck died. Dale Axelrod continues to teach workshops online.
