= Ivy Bethune =

American actress

- Born: Ivy Vigder; June 1, 1918; Sevastopol, Russia
- Died: July 19, 2019 (aged 101); Woodland Hills, Los Angeles, U.S.
- Spouses: William Charles Bethune (m. 1939; died 1950) Stuart Lancaster (m. 1971; died 2000)
- Children: Zina Bethune

Ivy Bethune (1 June 1918 – 19 July 2019) was an American actress. Born in Sevastopol, Russia, her career spanned the early days of radio, television and film, and she was a board member with both AFTRA and Actor's Equity. She was the mother of acclaimed ballerina and actor Zina Bethune.

A career character actor, her earliest regular role was in the radio series The Adventures of Superman. She appeared in various other television shows and movies throughout her career but became more widely recognized in the 1980s for recurring roles in Father Murphy and General Hospital. Other notable appearances included the Star Trek: The Next Generation first season episode "When the Bough Breaks" and Ma Peabody in the 1985 movie Back to the Future. She was a former Equity Councillor, devoting more than 80 years to civil rights activism and equal opportunity rights.

At the time of her death, Bethune was the second-oldest living female Star Trek performer, after Marsha Hunt. She was the third oldest overall Star Trek performer after Hunt and Norman Lloyd. She was the sixth Star Trek performer to reach the age of 100.

She died of natural causes in Woodland Hills, California at age 101.

== See also ==
- List of centenarians (actors, filmmakers and entertainers)
