= Ted V. Mikels =

American film director (1929–2016)

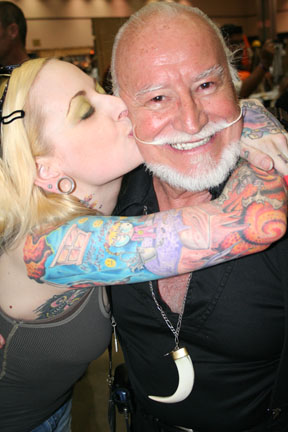
- Ted V. Mikels with a fan in 2008
- Born: Theodore Vincent Mikacevich; April 29, 1929; Saint Paul, Minnesota, U.S.
- Died: October 16, 2016 (aged 87); Las Vegas, Nevada, U.S.
- Occupations: Film producer, film director, screenwriter, actor
- Years active: 1950s–2016
- Spouse(s): Geneva M. Mikels, Wendy O. Altamura
- Children: Michele Cosette Mikels, Cherisse Mikels, Theodore Vincent Mikels Jr., Troy Scott Mikels

Ted V. Mikels (born Theodore Vincent Mikacevich; April 29, 1929 – October 16, 2016) was an American independent filmmaker primarily of the horror cult film genre. Movies that he both produced and directed include Girl in Gold Boots (1968), The Astro-Zombies (1968), and The Doll Squad (1973).

During the 1960s and 1970s, Mikels also operated his own recording label, Geneni Records, which primarily issued radio spot advertisement records used to promote his various movie projects but also released a number of stand-alone singles by such artists as Vic Lance and Little Leon Payne.

== Life and career ==
Mikels was born in Saint Paul, Minnesota, on April 29, 1929; his father was a Croatian immigrant who worked as a meat cutter, and his mother was an herbalist who emigrated from Romania. When Mikels was in third grade the family moved to Portland, Oregon, where his father took up farming. In Oregon, his father changed their surname from Mikacevich to Mikels.

During his grade school years, he was an amateur photographer who developed his own film in his bathtub. While in 8th grade, he was awarded his first acting role in a film that was to star William Powell, but World War II forced the cancellation of the production. By the age of 15, he was a regular stage performer and developed an interest in film-making when he attempted to shoot his performances. In 2008, he said, "I figured out that you have to move the camera around to get different angles, and then you have to edit the film when you're done."

In the 1950s, Mikels moved to Bend, Oregon, joined the Bend Community Players little theater group, and founded his own film production company. Soon, he began producing both educational documentaries, and short dramatic features.

Additionally, as horseman, archery expert, Indian and stuntman, he contributed to the production of several Hollywood films made in Central Oregon. Notably, during on location filming of The Indian Fighter, he taught studio special effects crews a technique for making flaming arrows appear authentic. Before leaving Oregon in the early 1960s, Mikels wrote and directed his first feature-length film in 1963, entitled Strike Me Deadly.

Throughout the 1960s through 1980s, Mikels lived in Glendale, California out of a house he decorated as a castle; for roughly 12 years, he lived with dozens of women at the house, stating once, “They did have a commitment to me. If they lived with me and I took care of them and cooked for them and paid the bills and all that, they were not to have involvements with other men…They didn’t owe me anything, they didn’t have to sleep in my room, my bed….” He became as well known for his hard-partying lifestyle as he did for his low budget exploitation films he'd produce and direct. He opened his first studio office with the help of actor John Houseman, and helped on many big budget Hollywood films but directing directly for a major studio constantly eluded him. Increasingly he'd shoot more of his films in the substantially cheaper Las Vegas, Nevada area and eventually moved there in the early 1990s.

In 1993, Mikels began running TVM Studios, a film and video production studio based in Las Vegas. On August 28, 2005, he was presented with a Certificate of Recognition by Nevada Lieutenant Governor Lorraine T. Hunt on the day of screening of his then-latest film, Heart of a Boy, which was the only G-rated film of his career. The certificate was awarded to Mikels for his contributions to the filmmaking industry.

In 2010, Mikels released the third installment in his Astro-Zombies franchise, Astro-Zombies M3: Cloned, followed two years later by Astro-Zombies M4: Invaders from Cyberspace. Both were produced by TVM Global Entertainment in association with Blue Heron International Pictures, and distributed by Alpha New Cinema.

Mikels died on October 16, 2016, at the age of 87 from complications of colon cancer.

== DVD releases ==
In 2007, Alpha Video released 10 of Mikels' films on DVD under the Alpha New Cinema imprint. Six of these titles included 10 Violent Women, The Doll Squad, The Corpse Grinders, The Corpse Grinders II, Girl in Gold Boots and Blood Orgy of the She-Devils, all of which Alpha later released as a six-DVD set titled Ted V. Mikels Signature Collection, which was autographed by Mikels.

== Filmography ==
Year	Title	Director	Writer	Producer	Cinematographer	Editor	Sound	Stunts	Notes
1955	The Indian Fighter	No	No	No	No	No	No	Yes	
1957	Oregon Passage	No	No	No	No	No	No	Yes	
1958	Tonka	No	No	No	No	No	No	Yes	
1963	Strike Me Deadly	Yes	Yes	Yes	No	No	No	No	
1964	Dr. Sex	Yes	Yes	Yes	No	No	No	No	
1964	Genesis	No	No	No	Yes	Yes	No	No	
1965	Orgy of the Dead	No	No	No	No	No	No	No	Assistant director
1965	Day of the Nightmare	No	No	No	Yes	No	No	No	
1965	One Shocking Moment	Yes	Yes	Yes	No	No	No	No	
1966	Agent for H.A.R.M.	No	No	No	Yes (Note: Uncredited)	No	No	No	
1966	The Black Klansman	Yes	No	Yes	No	Yes	No	No	
1967	The Hostage	No	No	No	Yes	No	No	No	
1967	Catalina Caper	No	No	No	Yes	No	No	No	
1968	Girl in Gold Boots	Yes	No	Yes	No	No	No	No	
1969	The Astro-Zombies	Yes	Yes	Yes	No	Yes	No	No	
1971	The Corpse Grinders	Yes	No	Yes	No	Yes	Yes	No	
1972	Children Shouldn't Play with Dead Things	No	No	Executive	No	No	No	No	
1973	Blood Orgy of the She-Devils	Yes	Yes	Yes	No	Yes	No	No	
1973	The Doll Squad	Yes	Yes	Yes	No	Yes	No	No	
1977	The Worm Eaters	No	No	Yes	No	No	No	No	
1977	Alex Joseph and His Wives	Yes	Yes	Yes	No	Yes	No	No	
1979	Missile X: The Neutron Bomb Incident	No	Yes	Yes	No	No	No	No	
1982	Ten Violent Women	Yes	Yes	Yes	No	Yes	No	No	
1986	The Aftermath	No	No	Yes	No	No	No	No	
1987	Angel of Vengeance	Yes	Yes	Yes	No	No	No	No	
1988	Knee Dancing	No	No	No	Yes	No	No	No	
1991	Mission: Killfast	Yes	No	Yes	No	No	No	No	
1993	Little Red Riding Hood Saves the Big Bad Wolf	Yes	No	No	No	No	No	No	
1994	Spooky World	Yes	No	No	No	No	No	No	
1997	Apartheid Slave-Women's Justice	Yes	Yes	Yes	Yes	Yes	No	No	
1998	Dimensions in Fear	Yes	Yes	No	Yes	Yes	No	No	
2002	Chimera	No	No	Associate	No	No	No	No	
2002	The Corpse Grinders 2	Yes	Yes	Executive	No	No	No	No	
2004	Cauldron: Baptism of Blood	Yes	Yes	Yes	Yes	Yes	No	No	
2004	Mark of the Astro-Zombies	Yes	Yes	Yes	No	No	No	No	
2006	Heart of a Boy	Yes	Yes	Yes	Yes	No	No	No	
2008	The Wild World of Ted V. Mikels	No	No	Executive	No	No	No	No	
2009	Demon Haunt	Yes	Yes	Yes	Yes	No	No	No	
2010	Astro Zombies: M3 - Cloned	Yes	Yes	Yes	Yes	Yes	No	No	
2012	The Corpse Grinders 3	No	No	Executive	No	No	No	No	
2013	Our Forever Friends	No	No	Associate	No	No	No	No	
2014	Astro Zombies: M4 - Invaders from Cyberspace	Yes	Yes	Yes	Yes	Yes	No	No	
2014	The Parallax Man	No	No	Executive	No	No	No	No	
2015	Paranormal Extremes: Text Messages from the Dead	Yes	Yes	Executive	Yes	Yes	No	No	
2017	Ten Violent Women: Part Two	Yes	Yes	Yes	Yes	Yes	No	No	Released Posthumously

== Audio/video ==
- The Wild World of Ted V. Mikels (documentary). Directed by Kevin Sean Michaels. Narrated by John Waters. Alpha Video (2010).
