= Marya Carter =

American actress and model

Playboy centerfold appearance
- May 1962
- Preceded by: Roberta Lane
- Succeeded by: Merissa Mathes

Personal details
- Born: Zella Maria Grajeda; May 12, 1942 (age 82); Los Angeles County, California
- Height: 5 ft 9 in (1.75 m)

Marya "Sally" Carter (born Zella Maria Grajeda; May 12, 1942) is an American model and actress. She was Playboy magazine's Playmate of the month for its May 1962 issue. Her centerfold was photographed by Paul Morton Smith.

During the 1960s and 1970s, Carter pursued an acting career, mostly appearing in B-movies and guest roles on television. She used several names for her credits; among them were Sally Carter, Sally Carter Hunt, Sally Carter Ihnat, and Sally Ihnat.

She was married to Steve Ihnat, a character actor best known for playing Fleet Captain Garth of Izar in the Star Trek episode "Whom Gods Destroy". They had one child together, a son named Stefan. She had a daughter from a previous marriage to another man. Steve died in 1972 of a heart attack on Marya's 30th birthday, and one month after the birth of their son. She was subsequently married to the game show host Peter Marshall in 1977, divorcing in 1983.

== Filmography ==
- Switch – "Dangerous Curves" (1978) ... Adele
- Charlie's Angels – "Terror on Ward One" (1977) ... Nurse Farragut
- The Rookies:
  - Sudden Death (1976)
  - Key Witness (1974) ... Mrs. Stafford
  - Frozen Smoke (1973) ... Mrs. Potter
- The Trial of Chaplain Jensen (1975) (TV) ... Irene Daniels
- The New Land – "The Word Is: Persistence" (1974)
- Police Story – "Chain of Command" (1974) ... Janice Magill
- Emergency! – "Audit" (1973) ... First Woman
- The Red Pony (1973) (TV) ... Miss Willis
- Do Not Throw Cushions Into the Ring (1970) ... The Wife
- The New Interns (1964) ... Nurse
- The Greatest Show on Earth – "A Place to Belong" (1964) ... Jeannie
- My Favorite Martian – "Who Am I?" (1964) ... Nurse
- The Dick Van Dyke Show – "The Man from Emperor" (1964) ... Sexy Secretary/Florence
- The Alfred Hitchcock Hour – "Goodbye, George" (1963) ... Starlet
- The Phantom Planet (1961) ... Juror

Merle Pertile	Kari Knudsen	Pamela Gordon	Roberta Lane	Marya Carter	Merissa Mathes
Unne Terjesen	Jan Roberts	Mickey Winters	Laura Young	Avis Kimble	June Cochran
