= Ten Violent Women =

1982 film directed by Ted V. Mikels

Ten Violent Women is a 1982 American film directed by Ted V. Mikels. A sequel, Ten Violent Women: Part Two, released in 2017, also directed by Mikels in his final directorial film.

== Production ==
The film was made in 1979. Mikels said:

It had been a couple of years since I had made a film, ‘Well let’s put one together, even if we can’t’ James Gordon White, a good writer, had written a thing called The Violent Sex, it was only a prison thing. I decided to make a story that has some action, and there’s a reason for the girls to go to prison. This thing about the girls using water pistols to rob jewelry stores and it led to a bit of difficulty there. And I took a big part. They said if everybody is going to take a part then I had to take one too.

Mikels made the film for only $145,000. He shot on existing locations including a disused Los Angeles, and used some of his polygamous "wives" at the time as eight of the ten violent women.
