= Paranormal Extremes: Text Messages from the Dead =

Paranormal Extremes: Text Messages from the Dead is a 2015 American film directed by Ted V. Mikels.
