= Agent for H.A.R.M. =

1966 film by Gerd Oswald

- Theatrical release poster
- Directed by: Gerd Oswald
- Written by: Blair Robertson
- Produced by: Joseph F. Robertson
- Starring: Peter Mark Richman; Carl Esmond; Wendell Corey; Barbara Bouchet; Rafael Campos
- Cinematography: James Crabe
- Music by: Gene Kauer; Douglas M. Lackey
- Distributed by: Universal Pictures
- Release date: January 5, 1966
- Running time: 84 minutes
- Country: United States
- Language: English

Agent for H.A.R.M. is a 1966 American science fiction spy thriller directed by Gerd Oswald and starring Peter Mark Richman, one of a number of spy thrillers of the era having conspicuous sci-fi elements; in this case, a fictional spore turns human flesh into a fungus on contact.

The film was intended to be the television pilot for a new spy series, but was later decided that it should be given a theatrical release instead. It was released as a double feature with Wild Wild Winter.

== Plot ==
Adam Chance (Peter Mark Richman) works for an American agency called Human Aetiological Relations Machine, or H.A.R.M. He is assigned to protect Dr. Jan Steffanic (Carl Esmond), a recent Soviet defector who has developed a new weapon which fires spores that upon contact with human skin slowly dissolves it.

Following his arrival in the U.S., Dr. Steffanic is taken into protective custody by H.A.R.M. and is placed in a beach house along with his niece Ava Vestok (Barbara Bouchet), with Agent Chance overseeing the development a spore antidote. Here Dr. Steffanic reveals the communists' real plan, which is to dust all American crops with these deadly spores. During their time at the beach house, Chance falls for Steffanic's niece, who is later revealed to be a communist spy. After the flat is attacked, Dr. Steffanic is kidnapped by European spies and taken to a warehouse. Chance infiltrates this location; in the ensuing gun fight, Steffanic exposes himself to the deadly spores in a valiant sacrifice and dies. Afterwards, Chance reappears at the beach house and arrests Ava.

== Cast ==
- Peter Mark Richman as Adam Chance
- Carl Esmond as Professor Janos Steffanic (misspelled as "Stefanik")
- Barbara Bouchet as Ava Vestok
- Martin Kosleck as Basil Malko
- Wendell Corey as Jim Graff
- Robert Quarry as Borg
- Rafael Campos as Luis
- Aliza Gur as Middle East contact
- Donna Michelle as Marian
- Marc Snegoff as Conrad
- Chris Anders as Schloss
- Steve Stevens as Billy
- Horst Ebersberg as Helgar
- Ray Dannis as Henry Manson
- Robert Donner as morgue attendant

== Music ==
On The Damned's 1980 LP The Black Album, Adam Chance is mentioned alongside Zorro and Corporal Clott in the song "The History of the World, Part 1", which was also released as a single.

In 2009, the punk rock band Riverdales released a song titled "Agent for H.A.R.M." about the film.

== Reception ==
Howard Thompson of The New York Times called the film an "anemic" imitation of James Bond series.

== Trivia ==
The film was featured on Mystery Science Theater 3000 in episode #815. This was Patrick Brantseg's first episode as Gypsy due to Jim Mallon's focus on directing.

== See also ==
- List of American films of 1966
