= Girl in Gold Boots =

- Girl in Gold Boots
- Directed by: Ted V. Mikels
- Written by: Art Names; Leighton J. Peatman; John T. Wilson
- Produced by: Ted V. Mikels
- Starring: Jody Daniels; Leslie McRae; Tom Pace; Chris Howard
- Cinematography: Robert Maxwell
- Edited by: Leo H. Shreve
- Music by: Nicholas Carras; Chris Howard
- Distributed by: Geneni Film Distributors
- Release date: April 25, 1968
- Running time: 94 min.
- Country: United States
- Language: English

Girl in Gold Boots is a 1968 American crime/drama film about the seedy underworld of go-go dancing, directed by Ted V. Mikels, who also directed The Astro-Zombies. It was Mikels's first movie for his own company, Gemini.

== Plot ==
Michele is a young woman working with her abusive father at a diner. She quits her waitressing job when she meets a patron, Buz, who initially came in to rob the place at gunpoint, but instead invites her to Los Angeles where he promises Michele his sister, the famous Joan Nichols, can land her a job as a dancer at a Hollywood nightclub. The two drive off to L.A. and pick up a traveling musician, Critter. Once in Hollywood, Michele immediately lands a job as a go-go dancer, Critter as a janitor, and Buz as a drug dealer. Michele soon discovers Buz is heavily involved in the underbelly of the club scene and she becomes witness to the club's drug trade and prostitution connections.

== Cast ==
- Jody Daniels as Finley "Critter" Jones
- Leslie McRay as Michele Casey (as Leslie McRae)
- Tom Pace as Buz Nichols
- Mark Herron as Leo McCabe
- Bara Byrnes as Joanie Nichols
- William Bagdad as Marty
- Victor Izay as Mr. Casey
- Harry Lovejoy as Harry Blatz
- James Victor as Joey
- Rod Wilmoth as Officer
- Chris Howard as Chris
- Mike Garrison as Station Attendant
- Michael Derrick as Car Attendant
- Sheila Roberts as Store Clerk
- Dennis Childs as Jail Inmate

== Release ==
=== Home media ===
In 2001, Image Entertainment released the Region 1 DVD of Girl in Gold Boots. This version is now out-of-print. In 2007, a Region 0 DVD of the movie was released by Alpha Video.

== Appearance on MST3K ==
Girl in Gold Boots was obscure for many years after its release, until it featured as a Season 10 episode of Mystery Science Theater 3000. Apparent skips in the print used in the television program led to some continuity issues, including a scene in a diner in which Buz suddenly appears in his seat next to Michele and Critter during their conversation. One DVD release, from MMI Image Entertainment, using a print from Geneni Film Distributing Company, shows the scene without the diner continuity issue but has its own continuity breaks, suggesting two different prints of the original film were used.

== Soundtrack ==
Nearly half of the songs in this music-laden movie, including the title song, were written by singer-songwriter and sound engineer Chris Howard, who appears as himself and is backed by a band called "The Third World" in the credits (not to be confused with the reggae band Third World). One scene features bongo player Preston Epps, who had achieved some fame a decade earlier with his 1959 pop hit, "Bongo Rock". In fact, Epps is listed in the opening credits as "that Bongo Rock man."
