= Jastrabie pri Michalovciach =

Village and municipality in Slovakia

Jastrabie pri Michalovciach Alsókánya
- Municipality
- Flag

- Location of Jastrabie pri Michalovciach in the Košice Region Location of Jastrabie pri Michalovciach in Slovakia
- Coordinates: 48.71°N 22.03°E
- Country: Slovakia
- Region: Košice Region
- District: Michalovce District
- First mentioned: 1337

Government
  - Mayor: Milan Kočiško (Hlas–SD)

Area
  - Total: 5.74 km^{2} (2.22 sq mi)
- Elevation: 104 m (341 ft)

Population (2025)
  - Total: 280
- Time zone: UTC+1 (CET)
  - Summer (DST): UTC+2 (CEST)
- Postal code: 721 1
- Area code: +421 56
- Vehicle registration plate (until 2022): MI
- Website: www.jastrabieprimichalovciach.sk

Jastrabie pri Michalovciach (Slovak pronunciation: [ˈjastrabɪe pri ˈmixalɔwtsɪɐx]; Hungarian: Alsókánya) is a village and municipality in the Michalovce District in the Košice Region of eastern Slovakia.

== History ==
In historical records the village was first mentioned in 1337. Before the establishment of independent Czechoslovakia in 1918, it was part of Ung County within the Kingdom of Hungary.

== Geography ==
The municipality lies at an altitude of 104 metres (341 ft) and covers an area of 5.74 km^{2} (2.22 sq mi) (2025).

== Population ==
Population statistic (10 years)
Year	1995	2005	2015	2025
Count	283	335	288	280
Difference		+18.37%	−14.02%	−2.77%

Population statistic
Year	2024	2025
Count	287	280
Difference		−2.43%

It has a population of 280 people (31 December 2025).

=== Ethnicity ===
Census 2021 (1+ %)
Ethnicity	Number	Fraction
Slovak	290	97.64%
Not found out	6	2.02%
Rusyn	4	1.34%
Total	297	

In year 2021 was 297 people by ethnicity 290 as Slovak, 6 as Not found out, 4 as Rusyn, 2 as Romani, 1 as Czech and 1 as Hungarian.

Note on population: The difference values of population numbers in the table "Population statistic" and in the sections "Ethnicity" & "Religion" is caused by the use of various statistical methods.

=== Religion ===
Census 2021 (1+ %)
Religion	Number	Fraction
Roman Catholic Church	135	45.45%
Greek Catholic Church	82	27.61%
None	50	16.84%
Apostolic Church	9	3.03%
Eastern Orthodox Church	8	2.69%
Not found out	6	2.02%
Church of the Brethren	3	1.01%
Total	297	

In year 2021 was 297 people by religion 135 from Roman Catholic Church, 82 from Greek Catholic Church, 50 from None, 9 from Apostolic Church, 8 from Eastern Orthodox Church, 6 from Not found out, 3 from Church of the Brethren, 2 from Seventh-day Adventist Church, 1 from Jewish community and 1 from Calvinist Church.

== Culture ==
The village has a small public library, a football pitch and a food store.

== Notable people ==
- Steve Ihnat, actor and director

== Genealogical resources ==
The records for genealogical research are available at the state archive "Statny Archiv in Presov, Slovakia"

- Roman Catholic church records (births/marriages/deaths): 1863–1926 (parish B)
- Greek Catholic church records (births/marriages/deaths): 1811–1898 (parish B)

== See also ==
- List of municipalities and towns in Slovakia
