= Father Murphy =

American western drama television series

- Genre: Western
- Created by: Michael Landon
- Directed by: Michael Landon; William F. Claxton; Maury Dexter; Victor French; Leo Penn
- Starring: Merlin Olsen; Moses Gunn; Katherine Cannon; Timothy Gibbs; Byron Thames; Lisa Trusel; Richard Bergman; Ivy Bethune
- Country of origin: United States
- No. of seasons: 2
- No. of episodes: 34

Production
- Executive producer: Michael Landon
- Running time: 60 minutes
- Production company: NBC Productions

Original release
- Network: NBC
- Release: November 3, 1981 – September 18, 1983

Father Murphy is an American Western drama television series that aired on the NBC network from November 3, 1981, to September 18, 1983. Michael Landon created the series, was the executive producer, and directed the show in partnership with William F. Claxton, Maury Dexter, Victor French, and Leo Penn.

== Synopsis ==
1870s frontiersman John Michael Murphy teams up with prospector Moses Gage to shelter a group of orphans who are being threatened with internment in a workhouse. Murphy disguises himself as a priest and befriends a schoolmarm to help the children find a home.

At the end of the first season, John's true identity is revealed to the head of the workhouse, and the orphans seem destined for a life of labor. Instead, Murphy marries the schoolmarm and they get custody of the children.

== Production ==
Many of the episodes were filmed at the Old Tucson Studios and theme park just outside Tucson, Arizona. The main village featured in the show was located at Big Sky Movie Ranch in Simi Valley, California; this was also the filming location for the television series Little House on the Prairie. The village was located about 200 yards (180 m) uphill from the Ingalls' farm set.

Father Murphy is an NBC production and is syndicated outside of the U.S. by MGM Worldwide Television, but MGM does not own the video rights.

== Cast ==
- Merlin Olsen as John Michael Murphy
- Moses Gunn as Moses Gage
- Katherine Cannon as Mae Woodward/Murphy
- Timothy Gibbs as Will Adams
- Scott Mellini as Ephram Winkler
- Lisa Trusel as Lizette Winkler
- Kirk Brennan as David Sims
- Byron Thames as Matt Sims
- Chez Lister as Eli Matthews
- Richard Bergman as Father Joe Parker
- Charles Tyner as Howard Rodman
- Ivy Bethune as Evelyn Tuttle
- Burr DeBenning as Paul/Richard Garrett
- Ted Markland as Frank
- Charles Cooper as Sheriff Caleb
- Warren Munson as Dr. R. G. Thompson

Notable guest appearances on the series include: Shannen Doherty, Mykelti Williamson, Kellie Martin, John M. Pickard, Eddie Quillan, Christina Applegate, Amanda Peterson, Donna Wilkes, Tina Yothers, Mary Beth Evans, Wilfrid Hyde-White, Jerry Hardin, James Cromwell, and Christopher Stone. Jason Brock

== Episodes ==
=== Series overview ===
Season	Episodes	Originally released		Nielsen Rank	Nielsen Rating	Average viewership (in millions)
Season	Episodes	First released	Last released	Nielsen Rank	Nielsen Rating	Average viewership (in millions)
1	21	November 3, 1981	April 11, 1982	52	TBA	TBA
2	13	September 28, 1982	September 18, 1983	66	TBA	TBA

=== Season 1 (1981–82) ===
No. overall	No. in season	Title	Directed by	Written by	Original release date	Prod. code
1	1	"Pilot"	Michael Landon	Michael Landon	November 3, 1981	101-102
2	2	"Pilot"	Michael Landon	Michael Landon	November 3, 1981	101-102
Two-hour (with commercials) movie
3	3	"Eggs, Milk and a Dry Bed"	Michael Landon	Michael Landon	November 10, 1981	103
4	4	"Establish Thou the Works of Our Hands"	Leo Penn	Paul W. Cooper	November 17, 1981	104
5	5	"A Horse from Heaven"	William F. Claxton	Frank K. Telford	November 24, 1981	105
6	6	"By the Bear That Bit Me: Part 1"	William F. Claxton	Ron Bishop & Steve Hayes & Michael Landon	December 1, 1981	106
7	7	"By the Bear That Bit Me: Part 2"	William F. Claxton	Ron Bishop & Steve Hayes & Michael Landon	December 8, 1981	107
8	8	"False Blessings"	Leo Penn	Vince R. Gutierrez	December 15, 1981	108
9	9	"The Ghost of Gold Hill"	William F. Claxton	John T. Dugan	December 22, 1981	109
10	10	"Graduation"	William F. Claxton	Peter Dixon	January 5, 1982	110
11	11	"Will's Surprise"	William F. Claxton	Chris Abbott	January 12, 1982	111
12	12	"Eighty-Eight Keys to Happiness"	Victor French	George Atkins	January 19, 1982	112
13	13	"Knights of the White Camelia"	William F. Claxton	Don Balluck	February 2, 1982	113
14	14	"The Parable of Amanda"	William F. Claxton	Paul W. Cooper	February 9, 1982	114
15	15	"The Spy"	William F. Claxton	Michael Landon	February 16, 1982	115
16	16	"The Heir Apparent"	William F. Claxton	Michael Landon	February 23, 1982	116
17	17	"In God's Arms"	William F. Claxton	Paul W. Cooper	March 2, 1982	117
18	18	"The Dream Day"	Maury Dexter	Michael Landon	March 14, 1982	118
19	19	"Laddie"	William F. Claxton	Larry Bischof	March 21, 1982	119
20	20	"Matthew and Elizabeth"	William F. Claxton	Chris Abbott	March 28, 1982	120
21	21	"The First Miracle: Part 1"	William F. Claxton	Chris Abbott	April 4, 1982	121
22	22	"The First Miracle: Part 2"	William F. Claxton	Chris Abbott	April 11, 1982	122

=== Season 2 (1982–83) ===
No. overall	No. in season	Title	Directed by	Written by	Original release date
23	1	"Happiness Is..."	William F. Claxton	Renee and Harry Longstreet	September 28, 1982
24	2	"The Father Figure"	Joseph Pevney	Michael McGreevey	October 5, 1982
25	3	"Stopover in a One-Horse Town"	William F. Claxton	Lee Sheldon	October 26, 1982
26	4	"Outrageous Fortune"	Joseph Pevney	Lee Sheldon	November 9, 1982
27	5	"The Reluctant Runaway: Part 1"	William F. Claxton	Chris Abbott	November 16, 1982
28	6	"The Reluctant Runaway: Part 2"	William F. Claxton	Chris Abbott	November 23, 1982
29	7	"Buttons and Beaux"	William F. Claxton	Gerry Day	November 30, 1982
30	8	"John Michael Murphy, R.I.P."	Joseph Pevney	Michael Landon	December 7, 1982
31	9	"The Witness"	Maury Dexter	Paul W. Cooper	December 14, 1982
32	10	"Blood Right"	William F. Claxton	Don Buday	December 21, 1982
33	11	"Sweet Sixteen"	William F. Claxton	Chris Abbott	December 28, 1982
34	12	"The Rockets' Red Glare"	Joseph Pevney	Paul W. Cooper	June 1, 1983
35	13	"The Matchmakers"	Joseph Pevney	Vince R. Gutierrez	September 18, 1983

== Home media ==
Image Entertainment (under license from NBC Studios) released both seasons of Father Murphy on DVD in Region 1 in 2004/2005.

DVD Name	Ep #	Release date
Season 1	22	October 26, 2004
Season 2	13	January 25, 2005
