= Kona Coast (film) =

1968 film by Lamont Johnson

- Directed by: Lamont Johnson
- Written by: Gilbert Ralston
- Based on: Bimini Gal; 1968 story by John D. MacDonald
- Produced by: Lamont Johnson executive: Richard Boome
- Starring: Richard Boone; Vera Miles; Joan Blondell; Steve Ihnat
- Cinematography: Joseph LaShelle
- Edited by: Alec McCrombie
- Music by: Jack Marshall
- Production company: Pioneer Productions
- Distributed by: Warner Bros.-Seven Arts
- Release date: May 10, 1968
- Running time: 93 minutes
- Country: United States
- Language: English
- Budget: $900,000

Kona Coast is a 1968 American drama film directed by Lamont Johnson, starring Richard Boone and Vera Miles.

== Plot ==
Sam Moran is a Honolulu charter-boat captain who leads fishing expeditions in the tropical paradise. When his daughter is found murdered at the party of a wealthy young playboy, he seeks the truth about the murder. Convinced the playboy is guilty, he enlists the help of his friend Kittibelle, who runs an alcohol-abuse treatment center where Sam's former love Melissa is a recovering alcoholic.

Sam runs into a wall of silence obviously built by hush money and islanders fearful of reprisals from the rich and powerful family. The determined dad fights to uncover the information that will land the murderer in jail as he avenges the death of his daughter.

== Cast ==
- Richard Boone as Capt. Sam Moran
- Vera Miles as Melissa Hyde
- Joan Blondell as Kitibelle Lightfoot
- Steve Ihnat as Kryder
- Chips Rafferty as Charlie Lightfoot

== Production ==
Producers at Seven Arts Productions approached John D. MacDonald to see if he had any ideas for a TV series. He did a treatment for a show set in the Bahamas called Bimini Gal, which he wrote for Robert Mitchum. Eventually this became Kona Coast.

Richard Boone had moved to Hawaii and was keen to help establish film production in the state. He did a deal with CBS who agreed to put up most of the budget for Kona Coast. It was produced by Boone's Pioneer Productions and was distributed by Seven Arts. CBS were hoping it would lead to a TV series, but the film was shot as a theatrical feature rather than a pilot. In May 1967, Boone said "I really don't want to do another series but I've been battling for three years to get production going in Hawaii and if a series will do it, I'll go." CBS produced $750,000 of the $900,000 budget.

The film was produced and directed by Lamont Johnson, who was friends with Boone and had worked with him several times in television. Harlan Ellison was hired to write the script, but he clashed with Boone, and Gil Ralston replaced Ellison.

In July 1967, Vera Miles signed to co star.

Boone said "my role in the movie - and, hopefully, in a series - is so much like me that it's ridiculous. The guy's got a large fishing boat - I own a 42 footer - he'll do anything for a price, he's easy going and loves kids, intelligent enough to deal sympathetically with all the varied groups in the islands, but a hard guy when he's turned on."

It was the first movie to use Cinemobile technology, which enabled the film to be shot in five weeks instead of six.

In March 1968, Boone announced Pioneer Productions would make The Guns of Mauna Kea, a second film in Hawaii.
