= Blood Orgy of the She-Devils =

- Film poster
- Directed by: Ted V. Mikels
- Written by: Ted V. Mikels
- Produced by: Ted V. Mikels
- Starring: Lila Zaborin; Victor Izay; Tom Pace; Leslie McRay; William Bagdad
- Cinematography: Anthony Salinas
- Edited by: Ted V. Mikels
- Music by: Carl Zittrer
- Release date: January 1973
- Running time: 73 minutes
- Country: United States
- Language: English

Blood Orgy of the She-Devils is a 1973 American horror film directed by Ted V. Mikels.

== Plot synopsis ==
Lorraine and Mark enter the world of witchcraft, where Mara foretells the future and helps them remember their past lives. When a series of mysterious murders begin to occur, they turn to Dr. Helsford for advice.

== Cast ==
- Leslie McRay as Lorraine
- Tom Pace as Mark
- Lila Zaborin as Mara
- Victor Izay as Dr. Helsford
- William Bagdad as Toruqe

== Production ==
Mikels later recalled:

I did about a three year research on witchcraft, everything from psycometry, to the study of the great witches of the past and the mysticisms that concern witches and sorcery. I wrote this after I went to seances. Usually when I write a script I try to isolate myself from everything and everybody, but would you believe, after three years of research, and notebooks full of material, I wrote the script in five days. It’s the only movie I’ve ever made where I did not change one word, not of the dialog, not of the story, I didn’t add or delete anything, I did it precisely as I wrote it.
