= USS Denebola (AF-56) =

Cargo ship of the United States Navy

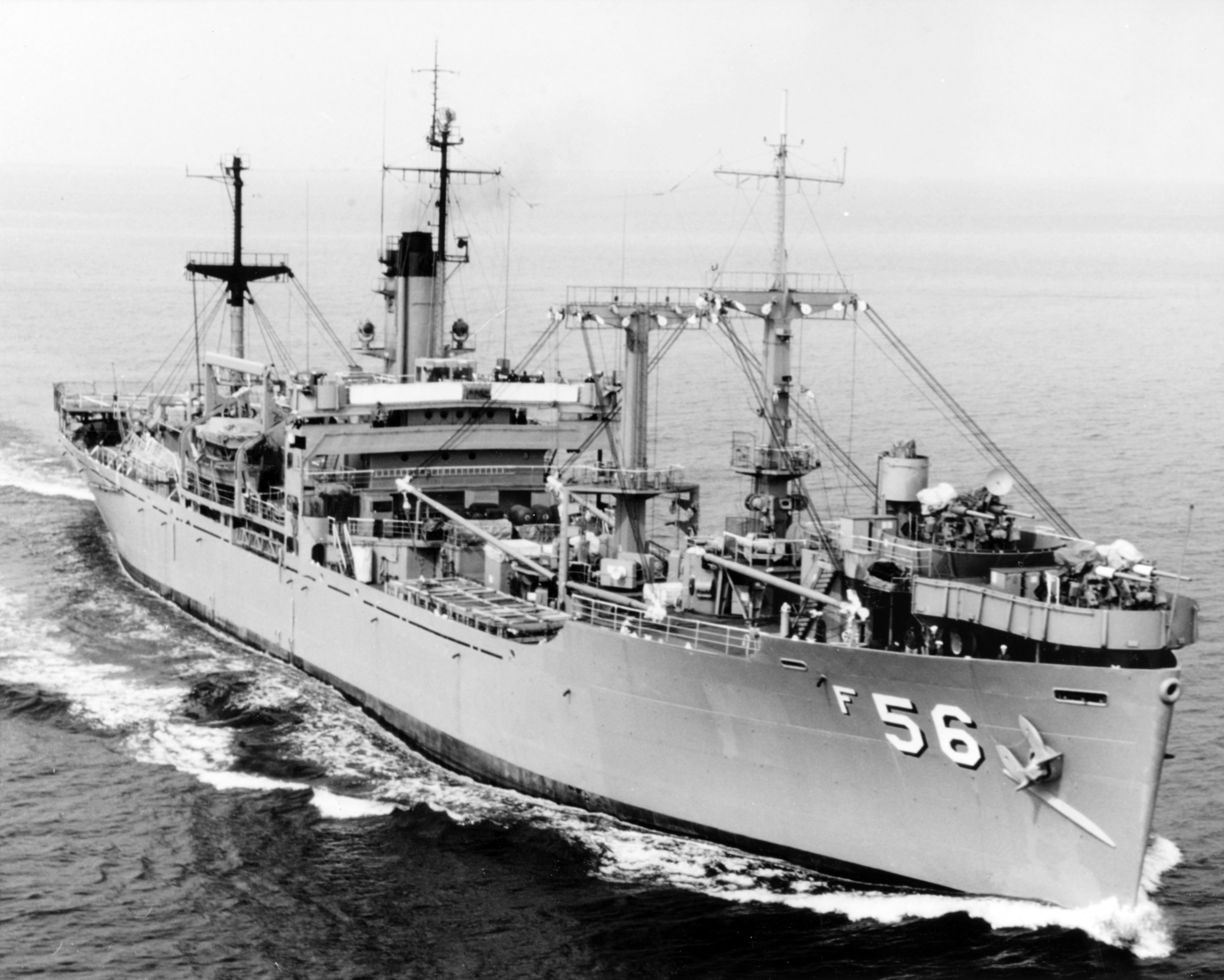
- USS Denebola (AF-56) steaming in Hampton Roads, Virginia, March 1971.

History

United States
- Name: USS Denebola, built as
- Ordered: as SS Hibbing Victory; VC2-S-AP3 hull, MCV 113
- Launched: 10 June 1944
- Acquired: 1 May 1952
- Commissioned: 20 January 1954
- Decommissioned: April 1976
- Stricken: 30 April 1976
- Fate: Sold for scrapping, 1 December 1976

General characteristics
- Displacement: 4,960 tons(lt) 10,850 tons(fl)
- Length: 455 ft 3 in (138.76 m)
- Beam: 62 ft (19 m)
- Draught: 28 ft 6 in (8.69 m)
- Propulsion: geared steam turbine, single propeller, 8,500 shp (6,300 kW)
- Speed: 16 knots (30 km/h; 18 mph)
- Complement: 250
- Armament: four twin 3 in (76 mm) dual purpose gun mounts

USS Denebola (AF-56) was a Denebola-class stores ship acquired by the U.S. Navy. She was built as SS Hibbing Victory as a type VC2-S-AP2 Victory ship built by Oregon Shipbuilding Corporation of Portland, Oregon, under a Maritime Commission. The Maritime Administration cargo ship was the 113th ship built. Its keel was laid on 2 May 1944. The ship was christened on 30 June 1944. She was built at the Oregon Shipbuilding yards in just 59 days, under the Emergency Shipbuilding program for World War II. The 10,600-ton ship was constructed for the Maritime Commission. She was operated by the (Pacific-Atlantic SS Company under the United States Merchant Marine act for the War Shipping Administration. The other two ships in her class were USS Regulus and USNS Perseus. USS Denebola's task was to carry stores, refrigerated items, and equipment to ships in the fleet, and to remote stations and staging areas.

The second ship to be named Denebola by the Navy, AF-56 was launched 10 June 1944 as Hibbing Victory by Oregon Shipbuilding Co., Portland, Oregon; sponsored by Miss J. A. Bush; transferred to the Navy 1 May 1952; converted at New York Naval Shipyard; and commissioned 20 January 1954.

== Hibbing Victory ==
For World War II, hull MCV 113, she was owned by the War Shipping Administration and operated by the Pacific-Atlantic Steamship Company. Hibbing Victory served in the Pacific Theater of Operations during the last few months of World War II in the Pacific War. She took supplies to help in the capture and occupation of Southern Palau Islands from 6 September 1944 to 14 October 1944. Next she took supplies for the assault and occupation of Okinawa Island from 10 May 1945 to 27 May 1945. On 3 July 1946 her operator changed to the Seas Shipping Company of New York. After the war on 4 August 1948 she was laid up at Wilmington, North Carolina as part of the National Defense Reserve Fleet. In 1950 she was put back in service for Korean War and was chartered to American Foreign SS Co. SS Hibbing Victory served as merchant marine naval supplying goods for the Korean War. She help move the 140th Medium Tank Battalion. About 75 percent of the personnel taking to Korean from the Korean War came by the merchant marine. SS Pratt Victory transported goods, mail, food and other supplies. About 90 percent of the cargo was moved by merchant marine naval to the war zone. SS Hibbing Victory made trip between 18 November 1950 and 23 December 1952 helping American forces engaged against in South Korea.

== Denebola operations ==
From the completion of her shakedown through June 1960 Denebola alternated eight tours of duty with the U.S. 6th Fleet in the Mediterranean with local operations out of Norfolk, Virginia. In addition she participated in NATO exercises in 1957 and 1958 and carried stores to the Caribbean. She served as plane guard for President Dwight D. Eisenhower's plane and on his return from the NATO conference at Paris, in 1957, and during her 1958 Mediterranean tour she replenished ships patrolling off Beirut in the aftermath of the Lebanon crisis. She was among the ships deployed during the Cuban Missile Crises. She was also in the Mediterranean during the June 1967 Arab-Israeli Six Day War, and replenished U.S. Navy ships on standby alert during that conflict.

== Decommissioning ==
Denebola was decommissioned in April 1976 and struck from the Naval Register, 30 April 1976. Final Disposition: sold for scrapping, 1 December 1976, by the Defense Reutilization and Marketing Service.

== Military awards and honors ==
Her crew was eligible for the following medals and commendations:

- Navy Meritorious Unit Commendation
- National Defense Service Medal (2)
- Armed Forces Expeditionary Medal (1-Cuba, 1-Lebanon)
- World War II "Battle Stars" for action at the capture-occupation of Southern Palau Islands.
