= Alex Joseph and His Wives =

Alex Joseph and His Wives is a 1977 American film from Ted V. Mikels. It stars Alex Joseph as himself.

Mikels later recalled Bill Thrush had a falling out with Joseph which prevented the film being distributed. Mikels was in a polygamous relationship at the time with "maybe four girls that were very close to me and so we cemented our little union and from that time on it did grow. Many people do not understand that you can have relationships like this where it can be honorable and decent."
