= Betty Warren (artist) =

American painter

Betty Warren Herzog
- Born: Betty Warren; January 6, 1920; New York City, New York, U.S.
- Died: November 8, 1993 (aged 73); Albany, New York, U.S.
- Known for: Portrait artist
- Spouses: Stuart Lancaster (m. 1949; div. 1960); Jacob H. Herzog (m. 1960)

Betty Warren Herzog (January 6, 1920 – November 8, 1993) was an American portrait artist. She was known for her bright colorist portraits and was one of the top paid female portraitists of the 20th century. Her last formal portrait was of Governor Hugh Carey for the State of New York in 1991.

== Biography ==
Warren was born in New York City. She was the daughter of illustrator Jack A. Warren, the co-creator of Pecos Bill.

At the age of 16, her father convinced her to become an artist like him. She studied art with her father, as well as Henry Hensche in Provincetown, and at the National Academy of Design. Hensche painted a portrait of Warren as a young woman.

Warren was the youngest woman to be given a solo exhibit at a major United States Museum (Berkshire Museum 1940), when she was twenty years old. She became nationally known as a portraitist by the 1980s.

She started an art school at Malden Bridge, New York.

In 1987, the Albany Institute feature a major retrospective of four decades of her work.

== Personal life ==
She was married to Stuart Lancaster; they had two sons, John Lancaster (now known as Guruatma S. Khalsa) and Michael Lancaster, and later divorced.

During her later life she was married to Jacob Herzog, a prominent attorney in Upstate New York, for over 25 years they mostly wintered in Mexico. and Warren painted some of her most acclaimed paintings there. She died in Albany in 1993, at the age of 73.

== Works ==
Warren's work was realistic, described by the Albany Times-Union as "traditional, even academic", in contrast to the more popular abstract expressionism of her time. Such works include:

- Her portrait of Governor Carey hangs in the second floor gallery, the "Hall of Governors", of the New York State Capitol.
- She painted long-time Albany, New York mayor Erastus Corning II twice.
- She got a commission for her portrait of Norman Rice, an art historian and the curator of the Albany Institute of History and Art.
- Warren's Under Canvas is in the permanent collection of the Albany Institute.
- She painted portraits of some of the associate justices of New York's highest court, which remain on display at the New York Court of Appeals courthouse.
- Her portrait of "Mrs. Charlie", the wife of circus legend Charles Ringling, was the centerpiece of a special exhibit on the circus, and is owned by The Ringling Museum in Sarasota, Florida.

== Students ==
Warren's legacy includes the many students to whom she taught art at her own school in Malden Bridge, as well as her classes at the Albany Institute.

Lorraine Lans was one of her students. Philip Gianni studied two summers, under a scholarship, with Warren at Malden Bridge. Norman Rice considered her a dear friend and worked with her. Rob Longley, an art teacher at the Provincetown Art Association and Museum, was also a student of hers. Nelson Shanks, noted portrait painter was her student. Susan Goetz, and Maryanna Goetz also studied with her. Both are noted painters. Barbara Harnack studied with Betty Warren and eventually Harnack married Warren's son Michael Lancaster.
