= Mantis in Lace =

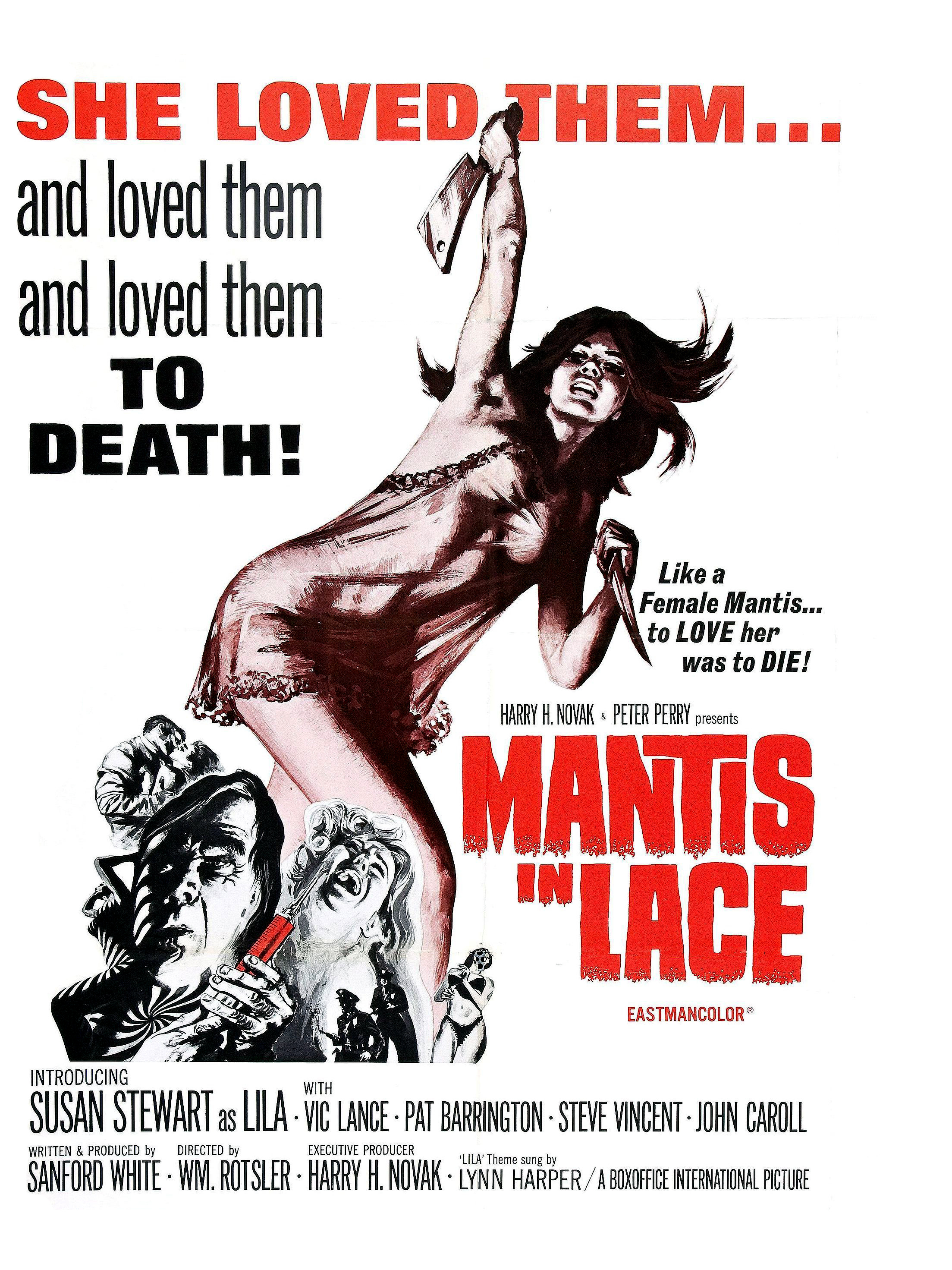
- Directed by: William Rotsler
- Written by: Sanford White
- Produced by: Harry Novak
- Starring: Susan Stewart; Vic Lance; Steven Vincent; Pat Barrington; Stuart Lancaster
- Cinematography: Laszlo Kovacs (credited as Leslie Kovaks)
- Distributed by: Boxoffice International Pictures (BIP)
- Release date: 1968
- Country: United States
- Language: English

Mantis in Lace (also known as Lila) is a 1968 American sexploitation film directed by William Rotsler and starring Susan Stewart, Vic Lance, Steven Vincent, Pat Barrington, and Stuart Lancaster. It was written by Sanford White and produced by Harry Novak. At least two differently edited versions have been released, one of which has more emphasis on sex and one of which emphasizes violence.

== Plot ==
Lila is a seemingly good-natured go-go dancer who strips at a seedy topless bar on the Sunset Strip. After taking LSD, Lila becomes a psychopathic serial killer. She continues to pick up men at the bar where she is employed, but after her sanity is lost she routinely is interrupted mid-coitus by psychedelic bad trips in which she visualizes a balding, half-naked old man clutching wads of cash in one hand and a bunch of bananas in the other. These psychotic episodes cause her to murder her partners by stabbing them with a screwdriver and dismembering them with a rusty meat cleaver (or in one case, a garden hoe) while imagining that she is cutting up cantaloupes and watermelons.

As pieces of the victims' bodies are discovered in cardboard boxes, she is pursued by a pair of Los Angeles Police Department detectives played by Steven Vincent and M.K. Evans. The narrative is interrupted by long sequences of topless dancing, softcore pornography, and recreational drug use.

== Cast ==
- Susan Stewart as Lila
- Steve Vincent as Sgt. Collins
- James Brand as Lt. Ryan (as M.K. Evans)
- Vic Lance as Tiger
- Pat Barrington as Cathy
- Stuart Lancaster as Frank
- Janu Wine as Angel
- John Caroll as Ben
- John LaSalle as Fred
- Hinton Pope as Chief Barnes
- Bethel Buckalew as bartender
- Lyn Armondo as real estate woman
- Norton Halper as tenant
- Judith Crane as dancer
- Cheryl Trepton as dancer

== Production ==
The cinematographer was Laszlo Kovacs (credited as Leslie Kovaks), who the following year would get his big break shooting Easy Rider (1969).

The film's theme song, "Lila", was composed by Vic Lance and csung by Lynn Harper.

== Reception ==
Boxoffice wrote: "William Rotsler's direction is at once studied and swift, capturing the nuances and subtleties of a mind gone awry through use of special effects and a surprisingly strong acting quality, particularly by Miss Stewart. The more squeamish won't be able to stomach this, but there's a sizable enough market that dotes on killings and rationalizing to make this a potential 'sleeper.' Vic Lance has some impressive moments as a hippie doomed for violent death. ... Eastman Color has been used effectively, and Lynn Harper, who has had considerable television exposure, sings the theme song."

Eccentric Cinema described Mantis in Lace as "a truly bizarre movie" and "a very strange trip ... [with] lots of tits and little sense", adding "the acting is either terrible or nonexistent. The same can be said for the direction and editing. The music score, relying chiefly on an electric guitarist who seems to be making up stuff as he goes along – none of it worthy of the term "improvisation", mind you – lurches from quirky kitsch to agonizing irritant very quickly. The drippy "Lila" theme song, used a gazillion times, should require a warning label on the DVD to prevent mental injury. Another reviewer warns that after watching this "less than riveting tale" the viewer's "biggest question will be whether you should categorize what you've just seen as a bad trip or merely a bummer".
