= Howard Thompson (film critic) =

American journalist (1919–2002)

- Born: Henry Howard Thompson, Jr. October 25, 1919; Natchez, Mississippi, United States
- Died: March 10, 2002 (aged 82); Cape Canaveral, Florida, United States
- Occupations: Journalist, film critic
- Notable credit: The New York Times

Howard Thompson (October 25, 1919 – March 10, 2002) was an American journalist and film critic whose career of forty-one years was spent at The New York Times.

Henry Howard Thompson Jr. was born in Natchez, the seat of Mississippi's Adams County. He began his college studies at Louisiana State University, but left to serve as a paratrooper in the United States Army during World War II. During this period, Thompson was captured and spent six months in a German prisoner of war camp. After demobilisation, he continued his studies at Columbia University. In 1947, he joined The New York Times as an office boy in the personnel department, and soon moved to the movie section as a clerk to Bosley Crowther, the film critic at the Times. He later advanced to a reporter who frequently interviewed film personalities and finally became a critic in the late 1950s. The byline on reviews during his early years was commonly indicated as "H.H.T." or "HHT". He also served as chairman of the New York Film Critics.

Thompson gained a reputation for his pithy comments about films for the television listings. The Village Voice called him "the Virgil of TV guides," and his capsule reviews were labeled "Tiny Thompsons". He retired from full-time work in 1988 but continued to write the "Critic's Choice" column and the movie listings.

Thompson suffered a stroke in 1996. He died of pneumonia at the age of 82 in the Florida city of Cape Canaveral where he was living in retirement.

== Bibliography ==
- Thompson, Howard (1970). The New York Times Guide to Movies on TV. Times Books. ASIN B000BI2LYY.
