= Strike Me Deadly =

- Film poster
- Directed by: Ted V. Mikels
- Screenplay by: Ted V. Mikels; Steve Inhat
- Produced by: Ted V. Mikels
- Starring: Gary Clarke
- Cinematography: Basil Bradbury; Ted V. Mikels
- Edited by: Ted V. Mikels
- Distributed by: Medallion Pictures (US)
- Release date: 1963
- Running time: 80 minutes
- Country: United States
- Language: English
- Budget: $15,000

Strike Me Deadly is a 1963 American thriller film written and directed by Ted V. Mikels in his directorial debut, and starring Gary Clarke, Jeannine Riley, and Steve Ihnat. Its plot follows a man and his wife who, after witnessing a murder, are stalked by a killer in a forest during a raging storm.

Mikels later commented on the film: "My kids say it's the best picture I ever made."

== Plot ==
A young couple on vacation see a hunter murder another and end up becoming the hunted.

== Cast ==
- Gary Clarke as Jimmy Grant
- Jeannine Riley as Lori Grant
- Steve Ihnat as Al
- Gordon Mauser as Chuck

== Production ==
The film was shot in 1959 in Bend, Oregon, where Mikels lived for a decade. He had moved there to direct community theatre, and found work as a stuntman on films like Tonka and Day of the Outlaw as well as making educational documentaries and short dramatic films. He self-financed his debut feature which was originally called Crosshair and then was retitled Strike Me Deadly. Mikels later said he sold everything he owned to make the movie and that it was far more representative of the types of films he wanted to make than the horror and sci fi he became famous for. His parents helped him finance the movie but they died in a car crash before it was completed.

Mikels met Steve Inhat through Gary Clarke. Mikels came up with the original script but Inhat made so many suggestions that Mikels liked, Inhat was given co credit as writer.

Mikels said he "did everything" on the film, "even shot some of the scenes in it, shot the smoke jumpers getting into their gear and into the airplane. We had a lot of 4H bombers putting out fires, it was an exciting thing to do."

== Reception ==
The film took a number of years to finish and be released. Mikels said the movie "could have done good things. It did play theaters and played television. It’s one of these things where you get into distribution and you never know what happens. I never knew what happened to it and I never got any money.... The big problem I had with that was that films were just starting to change over to color. I just couldn’t come up with the money to buy color film instead of black and white and that hurt." However the film helped launch the career of several of the cast and was admired by Wayne Rogers, who subsequently made three films with Mikels.
