= List of science fiction films of the 1960s =

This is a list of science fiction films released in the 1960s. These films include core elements of science fiction, but can cross into other genres. They have been released to a cinema audience by the commercial film industry and are widely distributed with reviews by reputable critics. Collectively, the science fiction films from the 1960s received five Academy Awards, a Hugo Award and a BAFTA Award.

== List ==
1960
Title	Director	Cast	Country	Subgenre/notes
12 to the Moon	David Bradley	Ken Clark, Michi Kobi, Tom Conway	United States	
The Amazing Transparent Man	Edgar G. Ulmer	Marguerite Chapman, Douglas Kennedy, James Griffith	United States	Horror
Assignment: Outer Space	Antonio Margheriti	Rik Van Nutter, Gabriella Farinon, David Montresor	Italy	
Atom Age Vampire	Anton Giulio Majano	Alberto Lupo, Susanne Loret, Sergio Fantoni	Italy	Horror
Atomic War Bride (a.k.a. Rat)	Veljko Bulajić	Antun Vrdoljak, Zlatko Madunić, Ljubiša Jovanović	Yugoslavia	Drama romance
Beyond the Time Barrier	Edgar G. Ulmer	Robert Clarke, Darlene Tompkins, Arianne Ulmer	United States	Romance
Dinosaurus!	Irvin Yeaworth	Ward Ramsey, Paul Lukather, Kristina Hanson	United States	Adventure comedy fantasy horror
The Human Vapor (a.k.a. Gasu ningen dai 1 gô)	Ishirō Honda	Tatsuya Mihashi, Kaoru Yachigusa, Yoshio Tsuchiya	Japan	Crime thriller
Last Woman on Earth	Roger Corman	Betsy Jones-Moreland, Anthony Carbone, Robert Towne	United States	Drama horror mystery romance
The Lost World	Irwin Allen	Michael Rennie, Jill St. John, David Hedison	United States	Adventure fantasy
Man in the Moon	Basil Dearden	Kenneth More, Shirley Anne Field, Michael Hordern	United Kingdom	
Mistress of the World (a.k.a. Herrin der Welt)	William Dieterle	Martha Hyer, Micheline Presle, Carlos Thompson	West Germany; France; Italy	Adventure crime
The Secret of the Telegian (a.k.a. Densô ningen)	Jun Fukuda	Kōji Tsuruta, Akihiko Hirata, Yoshio Tsuchiya	Japan	Horror
The Silent Star (a.k.a. Der schweigende Stern, First Spaceship on Venus, Planet of the Dead, Spaceship Venus Does Not Reply)	Kurt Maetzig	Yoko Tani, Oldřich Lukeš, Ignacy Machowski	East Germany; Poland	
The Time Machine	George Pal	Rod Taylor, Alan Young, Yvette Mimieux	United Kingdom	Adventure romance thriller (Note: Won an Academy Award for Visual Effects.)
The Two Faces of Dr. Jekyll	Terence Fisher	Paul Massie, Dawn Addams, Christopher Lee, David Kossoff	United Kingdom	Horror
Village of the Damned	Wolf Rilla	George Sanders, Barbara Shelley	United Kingdom; United States	Horror
Visit to a Small Planet	Norman Taurog	Jerry Lewis, Joan Blackman, Earl Holliman	United States	Comedy
1961
Title	Director	Cast	Country	Subgenre/notes
The Absent-Minded Professor	Robert Stevenson	Fred MacMurray, Nancy Olson	United States	Comedy family sport
Atlantis, the Lost Continent	George Pal	Sal Ponti, Joyce Taylor, John Dall	United States	Adventure
Battle of the Worlds (a.k.a. Il pianeta degli uomini spenti)	Antonio Margheriti	Claude Rains, Bill Carter, Umberto Orsini	Italy	Horror
The Beast of Yucca Flats	Coleman Francis	Douglas Mellor, Barbara Francis, Bing Stafford	United States	Horror
The Day the Earth Caught Fire	Val Guest	Edward Judd, Janet Munro, Leo McKern	United Kingdom	Drama romance (Note: Winner of a BAFTA Award for Best British Screenplay.)
Doctor Blood's Coffin	Sidney J. Furie	Kieron Moore, Hazel Court, Ian Hunter	United Kingdom	Horror thriller
The Flight that Disappeared	Reginald LeBorg	Craig Hill, Paula Raymond	United States	Adventure fantasy
Gorgo	Eugène Lourié	Bill Travers, William Sylvester, Vincent Winter	United Kingdom	Horror
Invasion of the Neptune Men (a.k.a. Uchû Kaisokusen)	Koji Ota	Sonny Chiba, Ryûko Minakami, Mitsue Komiya	Japan	Action
Konga	John Lemont	Michael Gough, Margo Johns, Jess Conrad, Claire Gordon	United Kingdom United States	Horror
The Last War (a.k.a. Sekai daisensô)	Shūe Matsubayashi	Frankie Sakai, Akira Takarada, Yuriko Hoshi	Japan	Drama
The Man with the Lens (a.k.a. Der Mann mit dem Objektiv)	Frank Vogel	Rolf Ludwig, Christine Laszar, Helga Labudda	East Germany	Comedy
Master of the World	William Witney	Vincent Price, Charles Bronson, Henry Hull	United States	Adventure
The Most Dangerous Man Alive	Allan Dwan	Ron Randell, Debra Paget, Morris Ankrum	United States	
Mothra (a.k.a. Mosura)	Ishirō Honda	Frankie Sakai, Hiroshi Koizumi, Kyōko Kagawa	Japan	Adventure fantasy thriller
Mysterious Island	Cy Endfield	Michael Craig, Joan Greenwood, Michael Callan	United Kingdom	Adventure family fantasy
Nude on the Moon	Raymond Phelan, Doris Wishman	Marietta, William Mayer, Lester Brown	United States	Fantasy romance
The Phantom Planet	William Marshall	Dean Fredericks, Coleen Gray, Anthony Dexter	United States	Action adventure
Reptilicus	Poul Bang	Carl Ottosen, Ann Smyrner, Mimi Heinrich, Dirch Passer	Denmark United States	Horror
Voyage to the Bottom of the Sea	Irwin Allen	Walter Pidgeon, Joan Fontaine, Barbara Eden	United States	Action adventure
1962
Title	Director	Cast	Country	Subgenre/notes
Amphibian Man (a.k.a. Chelovek-amfibiya)	Gennadiy Kazansky	Vladimir Korenev, Anastasiya Vertinskaya, Mikhail Kozakov	Soviet Union	Adventure drama romance
A Bomb Was Stolen (a.k.a. S-a furat o bomba)	Ion Popescu-Gopo	Iurie Darie, Liliana Tomescu, Haralambie Boroș	Romania	Comedy fantasy
The Brain That Wouldn't Die	Joseph Green	Jason Evers, Virginia Leith, Leslie Daniel	United States	Horror
Creation of the Humanoids	Wesley Barry	Don Megowan, Erica Elliott, Dudley Manlove	United States	
A Flying Proletarian (a.k.a. Летающий пролетарий)	Iosif Boyarskiy, Ivan Ivanov-Vano	Boris Popov (voice)	Soviet Union	Animation
Gorath (a.k.a. Yôsei Gorasu)	Ishirō Honda	Ryō Ikebe, Yumi Shirakawa, Takashi Shimura	Japan	Thriller
Invasion of the Star Creatures	Bruno VeSota	Bob Ball, Frankie Ray, Gloria Victor, Dolores Reed	United States	Comedy
La jetée	Chris Marker	Jean Négroni, Etienne Becker	France	Short drama romance
Journey to the Seventh Planet	Sidney Pink	John Agar, Greta Thyssen, Ann Smyrner	Denmark; United States	Action adventure fantasy horror
King Kong vs. Godzilla (a.k.a. Kingu Kongu tai Gojira)	Ishirō Honda, Thomas Montgomery	Michael Keith, James Yagi, Tadao Takashima	Japan; United States	Action adventure fantasy
The Man from the First Century (a.k.a. Muz z prvního století)	Oldřich Lipský	Miloš Kopecký, Radovan Lukavský, Lubomír Lipský	Czechoslovakia	Comedy
Moon Pilot	James Neilson	Tom Tryon, Dany Saval	United States	Comedy family
Panic in Year Zero!	Ray Milland	Ray Milland, Jean Hagen, Frankie Avalon	United States	Action horror thriller
Planeta Bur (a.k.a. Planet of Storms)	Pavel Klushantsev	Vladimir Yemelyanov, Georgiy Zhzhenov, Gennadi Vernov	Soviet Union	Adventure
Planets Against Us (a.k.a. I pianeti contro di noi)	Romano Ferrara	Michel Lemoine, Maria Pia Luzi, Jany Clair	Italy; France	Horror
Space Invasion of Lapland	Virgil W. Vogel	Bengt Blomgren, John Carradine	United States; Sweden	Horror. Recut of Invasion of the Animal People.
This Is Not a Test	Fredric Gadette	Seamon Glass, Thayer Roberts, Aubrey Martin, Mary Morlas	United States	Drama
The Three Stooges in Orbit	Edward Bernds	Moe Howard, Larry Fine, Joe DeRita "Curley Joe"	United States	Comedy family
Varan the Unbelievable	Jerry A. Baerwitz, Ishirô Honda	Myron Healey, Tsuruku Kobayashi, Derick Shimatsu	United States	Horror. Japan movie (1958) with new material.
1963
Title	Director	Cast	Country	Subgenre/notes
Atragon (a.k.a. Kaitei Gunkan)	Ishirō Honda	Tadao Takashima, Yoko Fujiyama, Yu Fujiki	Japan	Action adventure fantasy
The Crawling Hand	Herbert L. Strock	Peter Breck, Kent Taylor	United States	Horror
The Damned	Joseph Losey	Macdonald Carey, Shirley Anne Field, Viveca Lindfors	United Kingdom	Drama fantasy horror romance
The Day Mars Invaded Earth	Maury Dexter	Betty Beall, Lowell Brown, Troy Melton	United States	
The Day of the Triffids	Steve Sekely	Howard Keel, Kieron Moore, Janette Scott	United Kingdom	Horror
Ikarie XB-1 (a.k.a. Voyage to the End of the Universe)	Jindřich Polák	Otto Lackovič, Radovan Lukavský, Zdeňek Štepánek, František Smolík	Czechoslovakia	
Kalai Arasi	A. Kasilingam	M. G. Ramachandran, P. Bhanumathi, M. N. Nambiar	India	Comedy
Little Sun	Minsheng Wang	Ke Bi, Naihua Jin, Kang Ni	China	Children's educational film
Matango (a.k.a. Attack of the Mushroom People)	Ishirō Honda	Yoshio Tsuchiya, Kenji Sahara, Hiroshi Tachikawa	Japan	Horror mystery thriller
Monstrosity (a.k.a. The Atomic Brain)	Joseph V. Mascelli	Frank Gerstle, Erika Peters, Judy Bamber	United States	Horror mystery (Note: Alternate title: The Atomic Brain)
The Nutty Professor	Jerry Lewis	Jerry Lewis, Stella Stevens	United States	Comedy romance
The Secret of the Magic Gourd	Xiaozhong Yang	Lu Mao, Shan Jiang, He Wen	China	
Son of Flubber	Robert Stevenson	Fred MacMurray, Nancy Olson	United States	Comedy family
Steps to the Moon	Ion Popescu-Gopo	Ion Anghel, Marcel Anghelescu, Radu Beligan, Emil Botta	Romania	Comedy fantasy
Unearthly Stranger	John Krish	John Neville, Gabriella Licudi, Phillip Stone	United Kingdom	Horror mystery
X: The Man with the X-Ray Eyes	Roger Corman	Ray Milland, Diana Van der Vlis, Harold J. Stone	United States	Horror thriller
The Yesterday Machine	Russ Marker	Tim Holt, Ann Pellegrino, James Britton, Jack Herman	United States	
1964
Title	Director	Cast	Country	Subgenre/notes
Castle of the Living Dead	Warren Kiefer	Christopher Lee, Gaia Germani, Philippe Leroy, Mirko Valentin	Italy France	Horror
Children of the Damned	Anton M. Leader	Ian Hendry, Alan Badel, Barbara Ferris, Alfred Burke	United Kingdom	Drama horror mystery
The Creeping Terror	Vic Savage	Vic Savage, Shannon O'Neil, William Thourlby	United States	Horror
Dogora (a.k.a. Uchû daikaijû Dogora)	Ishirō Honda	Yosuke Natsuki, Yōko Fujiyama	Japan	Crime horror
The Earth Dies Screaming	Terence Fisher	Willard Parker, Virginia Field, Dennis Price	United Kingdom	Horror
First Men in the Moon	Nathan H. Juran	Edward Judd, Lionel Jeffries, Martha Hyer	United Kingdom	Adventure
The Flesh Eaters	Jack Curtis	Martin Kosleck	United States	Horror
Frozen Alive	Bernard Knowles	Mark Stevens, Marianne Koch, Wolfgang Lukschy	United Kingdom	
Ghidorah, the Three-Headed Monster (a.k.a. San daikaijû: Chikyû saidai no kessen)	Ishirō Honda	Yuriko Hoshi, Takashi Shimura, Yumi Ito, Emi Ito	Japan	Action adventure fantasy thriller
Gonks Go Beat	Robert Hartford-Davis	Kenneth Connor, Frank Thornton, Terry Scott	United Kingdom	Music comedy
It Happened Here	Andrew Mollo, Kevin Brownlow	Pauline Murray, Sebastian Shaw, Nicolette Bernard	United Kingdom	Drama war
Kiss Me Quick!	Peter Perry	Frank A. Coe, Max Gardens, Althea Currier	United States	Comedy fantasy horror
The Last Man on Earth	Ubaldo Ragona, Sidney Salkow	Vincent Price, Giacomo Rossi-Stuart, Tony Cerevi	Italy; United States}	Drama horror
Mothra vs. Godzilla (a.k.a. Mosura tai Gojira)	Ishirō Honda	Akira Takarada, Yuriko Hoshi, Hiroshi Koizumi	Japan; United States	Adventure fantasy
No Survivors, Please (a.k.a. Der Chef wünscht keine Zeugen)	Hans Albin, Peter Berneis	Uwe Friedrichsen, Maria Perschy, Karen Blanguernon, Burr Jerger, Wolfgang Zilzer, Teddy Turner, Stefan Schnabel	United States; West Germany	Crime
Pajama Party	Don Weis	Tommy Kirk, Annette Funicello, Elsa Lanchester, Jody McCrea	United States	Comedy musical romance
Robinson Crusoe on Mars	Byron Haskin	Paul Mantee, Victor Lundin, Adam West	United States	Adventure
Santa Claus Conquers the Martians	Nicholas Webster	Pia Zadora, Charles G. Renn, Doris Rich	United States	Adventure comedy family fantasy
The Time Travelers	Ib Melchior	Preston S. Foster, Philip Carey, Merry Anders	United States	
1965
Title	Director	Cast	Country	Subgenre/notes
The 10th Victim (a.k.a. La decima vittima)	Elio Petri	Marcello Mastroianni, Ursula Andress, Elsa Martinelli	Italy; France	Action comedy romance thriller
Alphaville (a.k.a. Alphaville: Une étrange aventure de Lemmy Caution)	Jean-Luc Godard	Eddie Constantine, Anna Karina, Akim Tamiroff	France; Italy	Drama mystery thriller (Note: Won the Golden Bear award at the 1965 Berlin Film Festival.)
Crack in the World	Andrew Marton	Dana Andrews, Janette Scott, Kieron Moore, Alexander Knox	United States	Action drama thriller
Curse of the Fly	Don Sharp	Brian Donlevy, Carole Gray, George Baker	United Kingdom	Drama horror mystery
Dr. Goldfoot and the Bikini Machine	Norman Taurog	Vincent Price, Frankie Avalon, Dwayne Hickman	United States	Comedy
Dr. Who and the Daleks	Gordon Flemyng	Peter Cushing, Roy Castle, Jennie Linden	United Kingdom	Adventure drama
Frankenstein Conquers the World (a.k.a. Frankenstein tai Baragon)	Ishirō Honda	Nick Adams, Tadao Takashima, Kumi Mizuno	Japan	Horror thriller
Frankenstein Meets the Space Monster	Robert Gaffney	James Karen, Marilyn Hanold, Lou Cutell, Robert Reilly	United States	Horror
Gamera, the Giant Monster (a.k.a. Daikaijû Gamera)	Noriaki Yuasa	Eiji Funakoshi, Harumi Kiritachi	Japan	Action horror
The Heat of a Thousand Suns (a.k.a. La brûlure de mille soleils)	Pierre Kast	Pierre Vaneck (voice), Barbara Laage (voice), Barbara Aptekman, Nicole Karen, Ursula Kübler, Deborah Romano, Alexandra Stewart	France	Animated short film
The Human Duplicators	Hugo Grimaldi	Richard Kiel, George Macready	United States	Horror
Invasion	Alan Bridges	Edward Judd	United Kingdom	Drama
Invasion of Astro-Monster (a.k.a. Kaijû daisensô)	Ishirō Honda	Nick Adams, Jun Tazaki, Akira Takarada	Japan; United States	Action adventure
The Monkey's Uncle	Robert Stevenson	Tommy Kirk, Annette Funicello, Leon Ames, Frank Faylen	United States	Comedy family
Monster a Go-Go!	Sheldon Seymour, Herschell Gordon Lewis, Bill Rebane	Bill Rebane, June Travis	United States	Horror
Mutiny in Outer Space	Hugo Grimaldi	William Leslie, Dolores Faith	United States	Horror
Night Caller from Outer Space a.k.a. The Night Caller	John Gilling	John Saxon, Alfred Burke	United Kingdom	Horror
Planet of the Vampires a.k.a. Terrore nello spazio a.k.a. The Demon Planet (UK)	Mario Bava	Barry Sullivan, Norma Bengell, Angel Aranda	Italy; Spain	Action adventure horror
The Satan Bug	John Sturges	George Maharis, Richard Basehart, Anne Francis, Dana Andrews	United States	Thriller mystery
Space Probe Taurus (a.k.a. Space Monster)	Leonard Katzman	Francine York, James Brown, Russ Bender	United States	Horror (Note: Alternate title: Space Probe Taurus)
Spaceflight IC-1	Bernard Knowles	Bill Williams; Norma West; John Cairney	United Kingdom	
Village of the Giants	Bert I. Gordon	Tommy Kirk, Johnny Crawford, Beau Bridges	United States	Comedy
Voyage to the Prehistoric Planet	Pavel Klushantsev, Curtis Harrington	Basil Rathbone, Faith Domergue, Marc Shannon	United States	Adventure
War Gods of the Deep (a.k.a. City Under the Sea)	Jacques Tourneur	Vincent Price, Tab Hunter, Susan Hart	United States; United Kingdom	Adventure fantasy horror
The Wizard of Mars (a.k.a. Horrors of the Red Planet)	David L. Hewitt	John Carradine, Roger Gentry, Vic McGee, Jerry Rannow, Eve Bernhardt	United States	Fantasy horror
1966
Title	Director	Cast	Country	Subgenre/notes
Agent for H.A.R.M.	Gerd Oswald	Martin Kosleck, Donna Michelle, Alizia Gur	United States	Action adventure thriller
Around the World Under the Sea	Andrew Marton	Lloyd Bridges, Brian Kelly	United States	Action adventure
Cyborg 2087	Franklin Adreon	Michael Rennie, Karen Steele, Wendell Corey	United States	Action drama thriller
Daleks - Invasion Earth: 2150 AD	Gordon Flemyng	Peter Cushing, Bernard Cribbins, Ray Brooks	United Kingdom	Adventure drama
Destination Inner Space	Francis D. Lyon	Scott Brady, Gary Merrill, Sheree North, Wende Wagner	United States	Thriller
Dimension 5	Franklin Adreon	Jeffrey Hunter, France Nuyen, Donald Woods, Harold Sakata	United States	Crime thriller
Dr. Goldfoot and the Girl Bombs	Mario Bava	Vincent Price, Fabian, Franco Franchi, Ciccio Ingrassia	Italy United States	
Ebirah, Horror of the Deep (a.k.a. Godzilla versus the Sea Monster (USA TV), Gojira, Ebirâ, Mosura: Nankai no daiketto)	Jun Fukuda	Akira Takarada, Toru Watanabe	Japan	Action adventure fantasy
The Face of Another (a.k.a. Tanin no kao)	Hiroshi Teshigahara	Tatsuya Nakadai, Machiko Kyō, Kyōko Kishida	Japan	Drama horror
Fahrenheit 451	François Truffaut	Oskar Werner, Julie Christie, Cyril Cusack	United Kingdom	Drama
Fantastic Voyage	Richard Fleischer	Stephen Boyd, Raquel Welch, Edmond O'Brien	United States	Adventure family (Note: Won Academy Awards for Art Direction and Visual Effects.)
The Frozen Dead	Herbert J. Leder	Dana Andrews, Anna Palk, Philip Gilbert, Kathleen Breck	United Kingdom	Horror
Gamera vs. Barugon (a.k.a. Daikaijû kettô: Gamera tai Barugon)	Shigeo Tanaka	Kojiro Hongo, Kyoko Enami	Japan	Action adventure fantasy horror thriller
Gogola	Balwant B Dave	Azaad Irani, Nayam Palli	India	Giant monster film
The Golden Bat (a.k.a. Ôgon batto)	Hajime Sato	Sonny Chiba, Wataru Yamakawa, Hisako Tsukaba	Japan	Adventure action thriller
Island of Terror	Terence Fisher	Peter Cushing, Edward Judd, Carole Gray	United Kingdom	Horror
The Main Star (a.k.a. Главный звёздный)	Roman Davydov	Valentina Sperantova (voice), Aleksandra Nazarova (voice), Rostislav Plyatt (voice)	Soviet Union	Animated short film
The Navy vs. the Night Monsters	Michael A. Hoey	Mamie Van Doren, Anthony Eisley, Billy Gray	United States	Horror
Planet of the Female Invaders	Alfredo B. Crevenna	Lorena Velázquez, Elizabeth Campbell, Maura Monti, Guillermo Murray	Mexico	Fantasy
The Projected Man	Ian Curteis	Mary Peach, Bryant Haliday, Norman Wooland, Ronald Allen	United Kingdom	Horror
Queen of Blood (a.k.a. Planet of Blood)	Curtis Harrington	John Saxon, Basil Rathbone, Dennis Hopper, Judi Meredith	United States	Horror
Seconds	John Frankenheimer	Rock Hudson, Salome Jens, John Randolph, Will Geer	United States	Thriller
Star Pilot (a.k.a. 2+5: Missione Hydra)	Pietro Francisci	Leonora Ruffo	Italy	Adventure
Sting of Death	William Grefé	Joe Morrison, Deanna Lund, Valerie Hawkins, John Vella	United States	Horror
Terror Beneath the Sea (a.k.a. Kaitei daisensô)	Hajime Sato	Sonny Chiba, Peggy Neal, Franz Gruber	Japan	Horror
Thunderbirds Are Go	David Lane	Sylvia Anderson (voice), Ray Barrett (voice), Alexander Davion (voice)	United Kingdom	Marionette action adventure drama family
The War of the Gargantuas (a.k.a. Furankenshutain no kaijû: Sanda tai Gaira)	Ishirō Honda	Russ Tamblyn, Ikio Sawamura, Kenji Sahara	Japan; United States	Action horror
War of the Planets (a.k.a. Anno zero - Guerra nello spazio)	Antonio Margheriti	Tony Russel, Lisa Gastoni	Italy	Adventure
Who Wants to Kill Jessie? (a.k.a. Kdo chce zabít Jessii?)	Václav Vorlíček	Jiří Sovák, Dana Medřická, Olga Schoberová	Czechoslovakia	Comedy
Wild, Wild Planet (a.k.a. I criminali della galassia)	Antonio Margheriti	Tony Russel, Lisa Gastoni, Massimo Serato	Italy	
Women of the Prehistoric Planet	Arthur C. Pierce	Wendell Corey, Keith Larsen, John Agar	United States	Action adventure romance
1967
Title	Director	Cast	Country	Subgenre/notes
The Ambushers	Henry Levin	Dean Martin, Senta Berger	United States	Comedy, spy
The Andromeda Nebula	Yevgeny Sherstobitov	Via Artmane, Sergei Stolyarov, Nikolai Kryukov	Soviet Union	
Blood of Ghastly Horror	Al Adamson	John Carradine, Kent Taylor, Tommy Kirk, Regina Carrol	United States	
Countdown	Robert Altman	James Caan, Robert Duvall	United States	Thriller
Gamera vs. Gyaos (a.k.a. Daikaijû kûchûsen: Gamera tai Gyaosu)	Noriyaki Yuasa	Kojiro Hongo, Kichijiro Ueda	Japan	Action family fantasy kaiju
Gappa: The Triphibian Monster (a.k.a. Daikyojû Gappa)	Haruyasu Noguchi	Tamio Kawachi, Tatsuya Fuji, Yoko Yamamoto	Japan	Action adventure comedy drama family fantasy horror thriller kaiju
Glorious Times at the Spessart Inn (a.k.a. Herrliche Zeiten im Spessart)	Kurt Hoffmann	Liselotte Pulver, Harald Leipnitz, Vivi Bach	West Germany	Comedy
Journey to the Center of Time	David L. Hewitt	Scott Brady, Anthony Eisley, Abraham Sofaer, Gigi Perreau	United States	
Jules Verne's Rocket to the Moon (a.k.a. Those Fantastic Flying Fools, Blast-Off)	Don Sharp	Burl Ives, Terry-Thomas, Gert Fröbe	United Kingdom	Adventure comedy fantasy
King Kong Escapes (a.k.a. Kingu Kongu no gyakushû)	Ishirō Honda	Rhodes Reason, Mie Hama, Linda G. Miller	Japan	Action adventure family kaiju
Late August at the Hotel Ozone (a.k.a. Konec srpna v Hotelu Ozon)	Jan Schmidt	Ondrej Jariabek, Beta Poničanová, Magda Seidlerová	Czechoslovakia	Drama
Mission Stardust (a.k.a. ...4 ..3 ..2 ..1 ...morte)	Primo Zeglio	Lang Jeffries, Essy Persson	Italy; West Germany; Spain	Action adventure
Night of the Big Heat (a.k.a. Island of the Burning Damned or Island of the Burning Doomed)	Terence Fisher	Peter Cushing, Christopher Lee	United Kingdom	Horror mystery thriller
Privilege	Peter Watkins	Paul Jones, Jean Shrimpton, Mark London	United Kingdom	Comedy Drama Music
Quatermass and the Pit	Roy Ward Baker	James Donald, Barbara Shelley, Andrew Keir	United Kingdom	Horror Mystery Thriller
Son of Godzilla (a.k.a. Kaijûtô no kessen: Gojira no musuko)	Jun Fukuda	Akira Kubo, Tadao Takashima, Bibari Maeda	Japan	Action adventure comedy family fantasy kaiju
The Sorcerers	Michael Reeves	Boris Karloff, Elizabeth Ercy, Ian Ogilvy	United Kingdom	Horror
Space Monster, Wangmagwi (a.k.a. Ujugoe-in wangmagwi)	Kwon Hyeok-jin	Nam Koong Won, Seon-kyeong Kim, Eun-jin Han	South Korea	Comedy kaiju
The Terrornauts	Montgomery Tully	Simon Oates, Zena Marshall, Charles Hawtrey	United Kingdom	Mystery
They Came from Beyond Space	Freddie Francis	Robert Hutton, Jennifer Jayne, Michael Gough	United Kingdom	Adventure
The X from Outer Space (a.k.a. Uchû daikaijû Girara)	Kazui Nihonmatsu	Eiji Okada, Toshiya Wazaki	Japan	Horror kaiju
Yongary, Monster from the Deep (a.k.a. Taekoesu Yonggary)	Kim Ki-duk	Moon Kang, Kwang Ho Lee, Soonjai Lee	South Korea; Japan	Adventure drama fantasy horror kaiju
1968
Title	Director	Cast	Country	Subgenre/notes
2001: A Space Odyssey	Stanley Kubrick	Keir Dullea, Gary Lockwood, William Sylvester	United Kingdom; United States	Adventure (Note: Won an Academy Award for Visual Effects and a Hugo Award for Best Dramatic Presentation.)
The Astro-Zombies	Ted V. Mikels	Wendell Corey, John Carradine, Tom Pace	United States	Horror
The Bamboo Saucer (a.k.a. Collision Course (1969)	Frank Telford	Dan Duryea, John Ericson, Lois Nettleton	United States	
Barbarella	Roger Vadim	Jane Fonda, John Phillip Law, Anita Pallenberg	France; Italy	Adventure comedy fantasy
Brides of Blood	Eddie Romero	John Ashley, Kent Taylor, Beverly Hills, Eva Darren	Philippines	
Charly	Ralph Nelson	Cliff Robertson, Claire Bloom	United States	Drama romance (Note: Winner of an Academy Award for Best Actor.)
Destroy All Monsters (a.k.a. Kaijû sôshingeki)	Ishirō Honda	Akira Kubo, Jun Tazaki, Yoshio Tsuchiya	Japan	Action adventure kaijū
Gamera vs. Viras (a.k.a. Gamera tai uchu kaijû Bairasu)	Noriaki Yuasa	Kôjirô Hongô Tôru Takatsuka Carl Craig	Japan	Action adventure family
Goke, Body Snatcher from Hell (a.k.a. Kyuketsuki Gokemidoro)	Hajime Sato	Teruo Yoshida, Tomomi Sato, Eizo Kitamura, Hideo Ko	Japan	Horror
The Green Slime	Kinji Fukasaku	Robert Horton, Luciana Paluzzi, Richard Jaeckel	Japan; United States	Drama horror
Je t'aime, je t'aime	Alain Resnais	Claude Rich, Olga Georges-Picot, Anouk Ferjac	France	Drama
Mad Doctor of Blood Island	Eddie Romero Gerry DeLeon	John Ashley, Angelique Pettyjohn, Eddie Garcia, Ronald Remy	Philippines	Horror
Mission Mars	Nicholas Webster	Darren McGavin, Nick Adams, George de Vries, Shirley Parker	United States	
Planet of the Apes	Franklin J. Schaffner	Charlton Heston, Roddy McDowall, Kim Hunter, Maurice Evans	United States	Adventure
The Power	Byron Haskin	George Hamilton, Suzanne Pleshette, Richard Carlson	United States	Thriller
Project X	William Castle	Christopher George, Greta Baldwin, Henry Jones	United States	Mystery
Thunderbird 6	David Lane	Keith Alexander (voice), Sylvia Anderson (voice), John Carson (voice)	United Kingdom	Marionette action adventure drama family
Voyage to the Planet of Prehistoric Women	Peter Bogdanovich	Mamie Van Doren, Mary Marr, Paige Lee	United States	Adventure
1969
Title	Director	Cast	Country	Subgenre/notes
All Monsters Attack (a.k.a. Godzilla's Revenge)	Ishirō Honda	Tomonori Yazaki, Eisei Amamoto, Sachio Sakai, Kazuo Suzuki, Kenji Sahara	Japan	Action adventure family fantasy kaiju
The Bed Sitting Room	Richard Lester	Rita Tushingham, Dudley Moore, Harry Secombe, Arthur Lowe	United Kingdom	Comedy
The Body Stealers	Gerry Levy	George Sanders, Maurice Evans, Patrick Allen	United Kingdom	Horror mystery
Captain Nemo and the Underwater City	James H. Hill	Robert Ryan, Chuck Connors, Nanette Newman	United Kingdom	Adventure family fantasy
Change of Mind	Robert Stevens	Raymond St. Jacques, Susan Oliver, Janet MacLachlan	United States	Drama
The Computer Wore Tennis Shoes	Robert Butler	Kurt Russell, Cesar Romero, Joe Flynn	United States	Comedy family
The Curious Dr. Humpp	Emilio Vieyra Jerald Intrator	Ricardo Bauleo, Gloria Prat, Aldo Barbero, Susana Beltrán	Argentina	Horror
Flying Phantom Ship	Hiroshi Ikeda	Masako Nozawa (voice), Akio Tanaka (voice), Akira Nagoya (voice), Gorô Naya (voice)	Japan	
Frankenstein Must Be Destroyed	Terence Fisher	Peter Cushing, Freddie Jones, Simon Ward, Veronica Carlson	United Kingdom	
Gamera vs. Guiron (a.k.a. Gamera tai daiakuju Giron)	Noriyaki Yuasa	Nobuhiro Kashima, Chris Murphy	Japan	Action adventure family
The Gladiators	Peter Watkins	Arthur Pentelow, Frederick Danner, Hans Bendrik	Sweden	Drama
Hibernatus	Édouard Molinaro	Louis de Funès, Claude Gensac, Bernard Alane	France; Italy	Comedy fantasy
The Illustrated Man	Jack Smight	Rod Steiger, Claire Bloom, Robert Drivas	United States	Drama fantasy horror
Journey to the Far Side of the Sun	Robert Parrish	Roy Thinnes, Patrick Wymark, Ian Hendry	United Kingdom	Drama (Note: Alternate title: Journey to the Far Side of the Sun)
Latitude Zero (a.k.a. Ido zero daisakusen)	Ishirō Honda	Joseph Cotten, Cesar Romero, Akira Takarada	Japan	Action adventure
The Mad Doctor of Blood Island	Gerardo de León, Eddie Romero	John Ashley, Angelique Pettyjohn, Ronald Remy	Philippines; United States	Adventure horror
The Man Who Thought Life (a.k.a. Manden der tænkte ting)	Jens Ravn	John Price, Preben Neergaard, Lotte Tarp	Denmark	Horror
Marooned	John Sturges	Gregory Peck, Richard Crenna, David Janssen, James Franciscus	United States	Adventure drama thriller
The Monitors	Jack Shea	Guy Stockwell, Susan Oliver, Avery Schreiber	United States	Comedy
Moon Zero Two	Roy Ward Baker	James Olson, Catherine Schell, Warren Mitchell	United Kingdom	Crime
Night of the Bloody Apes (a.k.a. La horripilante bestia humana)	René Cardona	José Moreno, Armando Silvestre	Mexico	Horror
Stereo	David Cronenberg	Jack Messinger, Iain Ewing, Clara Mayer	Canada	Fantasy silent
A Time of Roses (a.k.a. Ruusujen aika)	Risto Jarva	Arto Tuominen, Ritva Vepsä, Tarja Markus	Finland	
The Valley of Gwangi	Jim O'Connolly	James Franciscus, Gila Golan, Laurence Naismith	United States	Action adventure thriller western
The Windows of Time (a.k.a. Az idö ablakai)	Tamás Fejér	Miklós Gábor, Beata Tyszkiewicz, Ivan Andonov, Krystyna Mikołajewska, Heidemarie Wenzel, Iván Darvas	Hungary	
Zeta One (a.k.a. The Love Factor)	Michael Cort	James Robertson Justice, Charles Hawtrey, Robin Hawdon	United Kingdom	Comedy fantasy

== See also ==
- History of science fiction films
