= Randee Lynne Jensen =

American actress, born 1949

- Born: April 28, 1949 (age 77); San Bernardino, California, USA
- Other names: Randee Jensen, Randee Lee, Randee Lynne, Randee Lynn
- Occupation: actress
- Years active: 1961 - 2002

Randee Lynn Jensen, born April 28, 1949 is an actress from San Bernardino, California. During the 1960s she acted in films such as The Pit and the Pendulum and The Gay Deceivers. From the late 1960s to the early 1970s, she had a number of parts in exploitation and biker films. She had appeared in over ten films in the biker genre alone. These include The Glory Stompers, The Cycle Savages and The Girls from Thunder Strip. She has also worked in film production, casting and other behind the scenes roles. Prior to her main work in film she had done stage work.

== Acting roles ==
In 1961, she had a small part in the Roger Corman directed horror film, Pit and the Pendulum. In 1967, she would work again in another Corman directed film, The Trip that starred Peter Fonda, Susan Strasberg and Bruce Dern. Around 1969 / 1970, she had the part of Joy in the Paul Rapp directed film The Curious Female which also starred Angelique Pettyjohn, Charlene Jones, Bunny Allister and David Westberg. The following year she had a part in Evel Knievel. In 1976, she acted in the Jack Starrett directed film, A Small Town in Texas that starred Timothy Bottoms and Susan George.

=== Biker genre ===
Possibly her earliest entry into the biker genre was a bit part in the film Hells Angels on Wheels that starred Adam Roarke and Jack Nicholson. This film was released in 1967. The same year she had a bit part in The Born Losers that starred Tom Laughlin and featured Robert Tessier. Around the same time she appeared in the Dennis Hopper directed The Glory Stompers. She also had a bit part in Angels From Hell which was directed by Bruce Kessler and released in 1968. At the end of the 1960s she appeared in Run, Angel, Run!, Easy Rider, and Wild Wheels playing the part of Joy. In the Al Adamson directed Satan's Sadists, her character Rita she met an untimely end. Other biker films she did at the end of the 1960s were The Cycle Savages, Hells Angels 69. and the Bill Frame directed Scream Free! which starred Richard Beymer, Russ Tamblyn and Lana Wood. She had parts in two other biker films that were released in 1970. They were The Girls from Thunder Strip and The Losers. The Girls from Thunder Strip was produced by David L. Hewitt and Michael Mehas. Hewitt also directed it. It featured Maray Ayres, Casey Kasem and Megan Timothy. The Losers aka Nam's Angels was filmed in the Philippines and directed by Jack Starrett. It starred William Smith, Bernie Hamilton and Adam Roarke.

=== Filmography as actor (selective) ===
Film
Title	Role	Director	Year	Notes #
Wild Wheels	Joy	Ken Osborne	1969	
Satan's Sadists	Rita	Al Adamson	1969	credited as Randee Lynn
The Gay Deceivers	Sheryl	Bruce Kessler	1969	credited as Randee Lynne
The Cycle Savages	One of the girls	Bill Brame	1969	credited as Randee Lee
The Girls from Thunder Strip	Raped girl	David L. Hewitt	1970	
The Curious Female	Joy	Paul Rapp	1970	
Evel Knievel	Bathtub Girl	Marvin J. Chomsky	1971	credited as Randee Jensen
Aloha, Bobby and Rose	Girl at ice rink	Floyd Mutrux	1975	
Murph the Surf	Girl at Party	Marvin J. Chomsky	1975	
A Small Town in Texas	Vera	Jack Starrett	1969	
Smokey and the Hotwire Gang	Cheryle	Anthony Cardoza	1979	

== Production and crew ==
She worked in the 1969 film Hello, Dolly! as a production assistant. In the mid 1980s she worked in the Michael Mann directed Manhunter that starred William Petersen, Kim Greist and Dennis Farina. She was musical coordinator for the music soundtrack to the television show Miami Vice. Some years later she was an associate producer for the Edward James Olmos directed American Me, which was a film about Chicano gang life in Los Angeles. The film starred Olmos as well.
