= The Mighty Gorga =

- Theatrical release poster
- Directed by: David L. Hewitt
- Written by: Robert Vincent O'Neil
- Screenplay by: David L. Hewitt; Jean Hewitt
- Produced by: David L. Hewitt; Robert Vincent O'Neil
- Starring: Anthony Eisley; Megan Timothy; Scott Brady; Kent Taylor
- Cinematography: Gary Graver
- Edited by: Gary Graver
- Music by: Charles Walden
- Release date: July 19, 1969
- Running time: 84 minutes
- Country: United States
- Language: English

The Mighty Gorga is a 1969 American science fiction film directed by David L. Hewitt. The storyline concerns a couple hunting for a giant gorilla (The Mighty Gorga) in Africa for financial gain. Filmed on a minuscule budget, it has become notorious for its poor special effects.

== Plot ==
Circus owner Mark Remington is concerned that he is about to go bankrupt. On hearing of an overgrown gorilla (Gorga) in Africa, he travels there with the aim of capturing it to be used as an attraction in his circus. On arrival, the hunter who originally reported the gorilla is nowhere to be found, but his daughter, April says that he has been kidnapped. Together they set off in order to find both Gorga and her father. Meanwhile, Morgan, a rival hunter, is also on their trail.

Trekking through the jungle, Mark remarks on the strange vegetation, saying that it looks prehistoric. On discovering some giant eggs, the pair are suddenly menaced by a Tyrannosaurus. Soon, Gorga arrives and defeats the Tyrannosaurus while Mark and April make their escape. Eventually they arrive at a local settlement where they discover April's father, Tonga Jack who has befriended the natives. The natives, led by a witch doctor are offering up sacrifices to Gorga in return for their safety. Mark and April discover a treasure chest in a nearby set of caves, which Morgan attempts to steal, but he is struck down by Gorga as is the witch doctor. A nearby volcano erupts, devastating the surrounding area.

With her father rescued, April escapes with Mark, deciding to leave Gorga in his habitat. They agree to return to America and get married.

== Cast ==
- Anthony Eisley (Mark Remington)
- Megan Timothy (April Adams)
- Scott Brady (Dan Morgan)
- Kent Taylor (Tonga Jack Adams)
- Gary Kent (Arnold Shye)
- Greydon Clark (Dan Remington)
- Sheldon Lee (Kabula)
- Lee Parrish (George)
- John Parker (Charlie)
- William Bonner (Brandon)
- Bruce Kimball (Mort the Clown / The witch doctor)
- Gary Graver (Bill)
- David L. Hewitt (Mighty Gorga)

== Production ==
The Mighty Gorga was produced independently on a small budget. It was produced, directed and written by David L. Hewitt, who also played the titular gorilla, albeit uncredited. Hewitt had previously directed a number of B-Movies such as The Wizard of Mars, Journey to the Center of Time and Dr. Terror's Gallery of Horrors and would go on to be a special effects creator for films such as Shocker, Honey, I Shrunk the Kids and Superman IV: The Quest for Peace. The story was written by Robert Vincent O'Neil, who also co-produced the film. The film starred Anthony Eisley as Mark Remington, Scott Brady, Kent Taylor and the relatively unknown Megan Timothy as April. Actor Bruce Kimball has two roles in the film, first as a circus clown and later as the witch doctor.

Location filming took place primarily in Bronson Canyon and Simi Valley in California. The film contains stock footage of wild animals, shown in the jungle scenes, while footage of a cave monster is taken from the film Goliath and the Dragon. The Mighty Gorga was released in 1969.

The film has since been released on DVD in 2002 as a double-feature with One Million AC/DC. It was released by Something Weird Video.

== Critical reception ==
In the years since its release, The Mighty Gorga has received overwhelmingly poor reviews. Many critics have slated Gorga himself as being too obviously a man in a gorilla costume as well as the appearance of a plastic hand-held dinosaur. Mention has also been made of the film's poor plotting, slow pace and acting (indeed, many lines are flubbed during the film without being reshot). Other criticisms include the use of unrealistic matte shots to depict Gorga and the obvious use of stock film. A number of reviewers have said that the film is so bad that it becomes a "must-see", while others argue that the film has no merit whatsoever.

== See also ==
- King Kong (franchise)
- Konga
