= Joe Karston =

American stage illusionist and promoter

- Born: Joe Karston
- Other names: Joe Carston; Joe Karsten
- Occupations: Stage illusionist; booking agent; promoter
- Years active: 1940s–1970s

Joe Karston (also spelled Joe Carston or Joe Karsten) was an American stage illusionist, booking agent, and promoter who specialized in midnight ghost shows. Among the ghost show campaigns developed and produced by Karston were Dr. Macabre's Frightmare of Movie Monsters, Dr. Satan's Shrieks in the Night, and Dr. Jekyl [sic] and His Weird Show.

A competitor of fellow magician and ghost show host (or "ghostmaster") Jack Baker, Karston promoted and managed a roster of stage magicians that included John "Johnny" Cates, Wayne Harris, Kirk Kirkham, Harry Wise, and John Daniel.

Karston was an associate of David L. Hewitt, who had performed in Karston's Dr. Jekyl and His Weird Show. Karston screened the Hewitt-directed short film Monsters Crash the Pajama Party (1965) as part of a ghost show campaign; the short features an interval in which costumed actors would appear to exit the film and venture out into the audience, where they would abduct a planted "victim" from the audience and appear to bring them back into the film. Karston also served as a producer on the Hewitt-directed feature The Wizard of Mars.

In the late 1960s, Karston re-released films by director Ray Dennis Steckler, including the 1964 films The Incredibly Strange Creatures Who Stopped Living and Became Mixed-Up Zombies (released by Karston as The Teenage Psycho Meets Bloody Mary) and The Thrill Killers (as The Maniacs are Loose), as well as 1965's The Lemon Grove Kids. Under Karston's management, all three films were screened with involvement from costumed actors that interacted with the viewing audience.

== Career ==
In the late 1940s, Karston operated Joe Karston's Show Palace (alternately spelled Show Place), a tourist attraction at Bunker Hill Naval Air Base in Indiana. The attraction showcased vaudeville and music performances, and boasted an indoor heated swimming pool equipped with diving boards. The 50-meter, 735,000-gallon pool opened to the public on November 9, 1947.

By the 1950s, Karston had transitioned to developing and operating midnight ghost shows, a form of traveling stage show that incorporated stage magic and supposedly supernatural elements. Karston had a roster of magicians under his management whom he would promote as hosts (or "ghostmasters") of these ghost shows. This stable of ghostmasters included John "Johnny" Cates, Wayne Harris, Kirk Kirkham, Harry Wise, and John Daniel. Karston and his magicians sometimes attended shows by competing ghostmaster Jack Baker, who performed under the stage name Dr. Silkini, to study Baker's routines.

Among the ghost show campaigns promoted by Karston were Dr. Satan's Shrieks in the Night, which was hosted by Cates under the Dr. Satan moniker, and Dr. Jekyl [sic] and His Weird Show, which was performed by Karston or Wise. Karston-produced ghost shows would eventually begin incorporating appearances by actors dressed as movie monsters, often using rubber masks created by Don Post. Such monsters included the Fly, Teenage Frankenstein, Rodan, and the Colossal Beast.

In 1965, Karston promoted and screened the short film Monsters Crash the Pajama Party as part of a ghost show campaign; the film was directed by David L. Hewitt, who had previously been a performer in Dr. Jekyl and His Weird Show. The short features an interval in which costumed actors would appear to exit the film and roam out into the audience, where they would proceed to kidnap a planted "victim" from the audience and appear to bring them back into the film. Karston also produced the Hewitt-directed feature film The Wizard of Mars. Around 1966, Karston re-released films by director Ray Dennis Steckler, including the 1964 films The Incredibly Strange Creatures Who Stopped Living and Became Mixed-Up Zombies (released by Karston as The Teenage Psycho Meets Bloody Mary) and The Thrill Killers (as The Maniacs are Loose), as well as 1965's The Lemon Grove Kids. Karston had all three films screened with involvement from costumed actors: The Incredibly Strange Creatures saw live actors dressed as zombies roam the audience; The Thrill Killers featured a live actor dressed as a character from the film; and The Lemon Grove Kids featured a live actor dressed as a mummy.

Karston later retired and moved to Redondo Beach, California.
