= The Wizard of Mars =

- Theatrical release poster
- Directed by: David L. Hewitt
- Screenplay by: David L. Hewitt
- Story by: David L. Hewitt; Armando Busick
- Produced by: David L. Hewitt; Joe Karston; Gary R. Heacock
- Starring: John Carradine; Roger Gentry; Vic McGee; Jerry Rannow; Eve Bernhardt
- Cinematography: Austin McKinney
- Edited by: Tom Graeff
- Music by: Frank A. Coe
- Distributed by: American General Pictures Inc.
- Release date: 1965
- Running time: 85 minutes
- Country: United States
- Language: English
- Budget: $33,000 (estimated)

The Wizard of Mars is a 1965 American science fiction film directed and co-written by David L. Hewitt. It is loosely based on L. Frank Baum's 1900 novel The Wonderful Wizard of Oz. The title character is portrayed by John Carradine, who gives a lengthy monologue as a projection near the end of the film. The film contrasts with Baum's novel by depicting the constraints of human aspirations.

== Plot ==
In 1975, Steve, "Doc", Charlie, and Dorothy are astronauts on a spacecraft approaching Mars. Following a scheduled cutoff of communications, they collide with something in orbit around the Red Planet. They are forced to jettison the main stage and land in their vehicle's control section. They disembark from the ship, wearing pressure suits and taking with them inflatable boats, oars, and a rifle. As they drift down a canal, they are attacked by water creatures and escape into a cave system. The cave comes to an end near a lava flow, and they are forced to leave their boats and edge around a lava lake, eventually finding a passage to the surface just before the volcano erupts in a lava fountain. Believing they hear the signal of their ship's main stage, they instead discover an automated biolab that had been sent beforehand to determine the habitability of Mars. Charlie becomes hysterical and fires the rifle at the lab, inadvertently revealing that it contains enough oxygen to replenish their dwindling air supply. A sandstorm then blows in, and they take shelter in the lee of the lab.

The sandstorm uncovers a golden stone road, which they follow to an abandoned stone city with breathable atmosphere. This enables them to remove their suits and explore two charred outlines beside a cutting torch near a wall with a partially cut hole and a column with a hole in it. This column proves to be hollow, but a second one nearby turns out to conceal a desiccated Martian, with a transparent braincase. Mental communication between it and Steve guides them to a hall which contains a projection of a head. It reveals that it represents the collective consciousness of all Martians. They were an old race who once ruled a good part of the galaxy, but who retreated to Mars to ponder. To give themselves time to think, they took their city out of time, in an eternal present. Eventually they discovered that they had a further destiny, but could not reverse the process, being then incapable of physical effort. The city had been previously entered by other sentient aliens, who thought to plunder, instead of help. It directs them to a sphere, which must be replaced in the mechanism, in order for time to begin moving forward once again. Steve drops the sphere, revealing a model of the city. They return to where the others have been cutting a hole in the wall and complete the task. Behind the wall is a giant metal pendulum. Charlie, with help from Steve, manages to replace the sphere into the clockwork above the pendulum. The pendulum begins to swing once again. They escape as the city begins to crumble, eventually fading away. They eventually collapse by the stone road and vanish. They then reappear in their orbiting spacecraft, dirty and exhausted, where they discover to their surprise that only two minutes have gone by.

== Cast ==
- John Carradine – The Wizard of Mars
- Roger Gentry – Steve
- Vic McGee – Doc
- Jerry Rannow – Charlie
- Eve Bernhardt – Dorothy

== Production ==
David L. Hewitt had previously co-written the screenplay of The Time Travelers and had turned a 33-minute-long Monsters Crash the Pajama Party into part of an interactive stage show. Hewitt met a group of vending machine operators who wanted to produce films with Hewitt convincing them that science fiction had potential. Their company American General Pictures' first full-length film The Wizard of Mars was made using an optical printer for special effects and parts were filmed for $33,000 in Great Basin National Park and Fallon, Nevada. The mask of the title character was made by Don Post and reused in Space Probe Taurus. Jerry Rannow claims the producer of the film still owes him $500.

The film was first acquired for television viewing with the film cut to 78 minutes. Hewitt reacquired the work for a stage show presentation with a variety of special effects used on the audience.

Eve Bernhardt, the sole actress in the film, once said that her co-star Gentry wanted an intimate relationship with her during the filming.

== Retitlings ==
In the early 1980s, the film was released on videotape under its original title, by NTA Home Video (an imprint of Republic Pictures). It was released as Horrors of the Red Planet in 1988 by Genesis Home Video and later by Burbank Video and Star Classics Home Video. The latter two editions topped the cast list (as given on the cover) with Lon Chaney Jr., who did not appear in this film but did appear in Hewitt's Doctor Terror's Gallery of Horrors with Carradine, Gentry, and McGee. Also in the early 1980s, Regal Video Inc. released both of these films in identical packaging under the title Alien Massacre. Both films were retitled on-screen, which left Carradine's screen credit "John Carradine as" just before the title, incomplete.

== See also ==
- List of American films of 1965
- List of films set on Mars
- List of films featuring extraterrestrials
- Mars in fiction
