= Ghost master =

Ghost master or ghostmaster may refer to:

- Ghost Master, a 2003 puzzle strategy video game
- Ghostmaster, the host of a midnight ghost show
- Ghostmaster, a comic book character and adversary of Manhunter in comic books published by Quality Comics
- The Ghostmaster, a character in the American animated television series The Real Ghostbusters
