= Midnight ghost show =

Traveling horror-themed stage shows

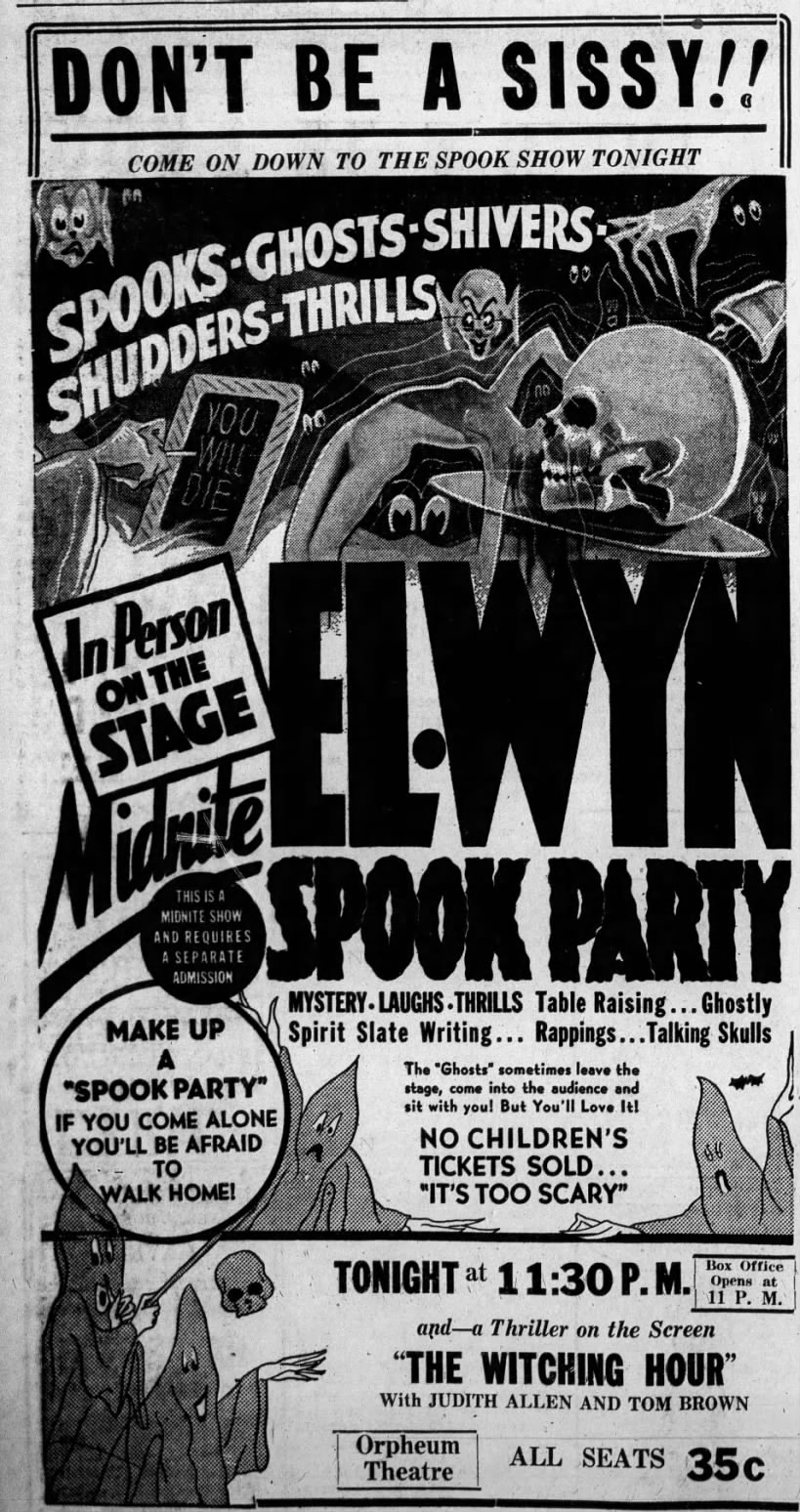
- El-Wyn's Midnite Spook Party newspaper ad from 1934
- Originating culture: United States
- Originating era: Early 20th century

Midnight ghost shows (also known as spook shows, midnight spook shows, voodoo shows, or monster shows) were traveling stage shows that originated in the United States during the Great Depression. The shows were influenced by the stage magic traditions that preceded them, and typically incorporated illusions; simulated séances; interactivity between a host—often called a "ghostmaster"—or performers and the audience; a "blackout" sequence in which the theater would go completely dark; and horror film screenings before or after the show.

Ghost shows experienced a resurgence in popularity in the 1950s due to the output of horror and science fiction films aimed at the young adult market. They declined due to the rise of television, along with the public's changing taste in entertainment, but continued as late as the 1970s. The ghostmasters who presented the shows have been described as precursors to TV horror hosts, and the elements of audience participation and film screenings in the shows themselves have been characterized as prototypical to midnight movies like The Rocky Horror Picture Show.

== Overview ==
Author Mark Walker coined the term "ghostmaster" to refer to the hosts of ghost shows. The format of a ghost show usually entailed an introduction by a ghostmaster, usually presenting themselves as a medium; this was followed by a series of conjuring and mentalist illusions performed in low light, often with participation from the audience. The shows also commonly incorporated staged hypnotism acts in which pre-chosen subjects would appear to be controlled by a hypnotist, as well as illusions in which the ghostmaster or another performer would appear to dismember a young woman. The finale of a ghost show would usually be a "blackout" sequence, wherein the theater would go entirely dark, and actors performing as ghosts or monsters would often terrorize members of the audience.

By the end of the 1930s, it became customary for the blackout to be followed by the screening of a horror film. Former ghostmaster and ghost show historian Jim Ridenour described his preferred structure for ghost shows as such:

The ideal spook show starts with a horror movie. This lets the hoodlums get tired and worn out. After the first movie ends, you immediately start the stage show. The stage show ends with a blackout where the theater is completely dark, and spooks, ghosts, bats, skeletons – luminescent paintings on fishing poles – "fly over" the heads of the audience. Once the lights come on, you immediately hit the screen with a second horror flick.

== History ==
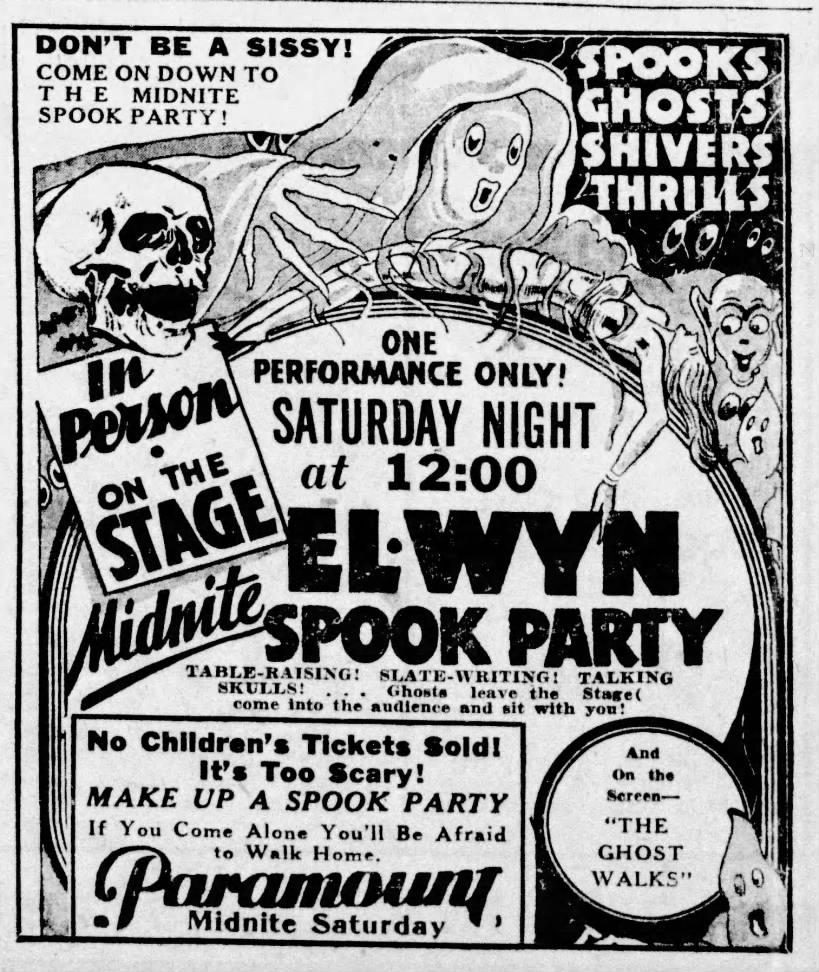
El-Wyn's Midnite Spook Party newspaper advertisement from 1935

In 1929, stage magician Elwin-Charles Peck (who performed as "El-Wyn") created one of the first ghost shows, El-Wyn's Midnite Spook Party. The course of the show saw Peck telling the audience that he was a medium in contact with the spirit world, and integrated eerie sounds and objects appearing to move mysteriously. Towards the end of the show, the theater would be plunged into darkness, as simulated spirits of the dead appeared and vanished both onstage and over the audience. El-Wyn's Midnite Spook Party spawned a number of imitators. In the late 1930s or early 1940s, Toledo, Ohio-based Jack Baker, his wife, and his brother-by-adoption Wyman Baker created Dr. Silkini's Asylum of Horrors, with Jack Baker performing under the alias "Dr. Silkini". Asylum of Horrors quickly evolved to incorporate both horror and comedy in its presentation, satirizing the spiritualist scene and intermixing illusions and audience participation with jokes, gimmicks, and skits. The shows would also feature two or three blackout sequences instead of one. As the show's popularity grew, Universal Pictures sued Baker for using Frankenstein's monster in his performances, but eventually came to a contractual agreement with the studio that allowed him to maintain the character as part of the act. Asylum of Horrors was performed in the U.S., as well as Canada, Mexico, and Europe.

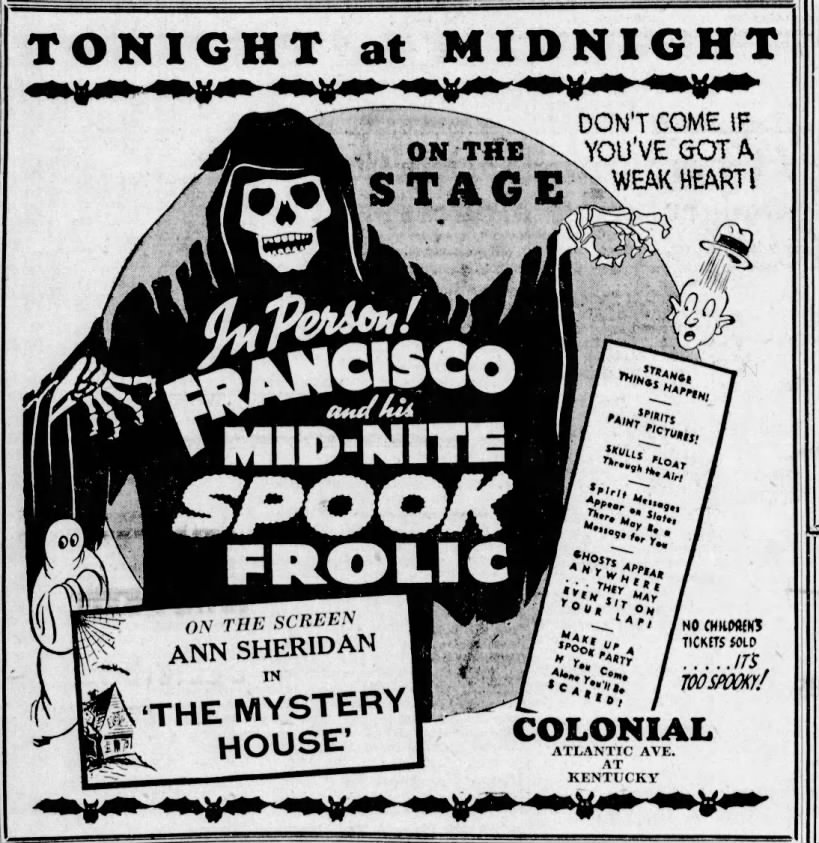
Francisco and his Midnite Spook Frolic newspaper ad from 1941

Some midnight ghost shows featured appearances from film stars like Bela Lugosi and Glenn Strange.

Ghost shows experienced an increase in popularity in the 1950s, coinciding with the output of horror and science fiction films aimed at the young adult market. The prevalence of ghost shows declined with the advent of television and the changing tastes of audiences, but continued into the 1970s. In later years, ghost shows placed a greater emphasis on sex appeal and violence, featuring scantily clad female assistants and a focus on illusions involving dismemberment and torture.

== Legacy ==
Midnight ghost shows have been described as forerunners to gimmick-based film promotion (as practiced by such figures as William Castle), as well as TV horror hosts of the 1950s and beyond, the latter of whom were typically "comic, ghoulish figures that were very similar to the emcees of the midnight ghost shows." In fact, stage magician and ghostmaster Philip Morris (who performed under the alias "Dr. Evil"), eventually transitioned to become a TV horror host, presenting Dr. Evil's Horror Theatre, broadcast on the U.S.'s East Coast from 1960 to 1968.

Ghost shows have also been referred to as early examples of the midnight movie phenomenon, prefiguring midnight showings associated with such cult films as The Rocky Horror Picture Show, which is specifically noted for its large international following and midnight screenings that involve audience participation.

== List of ghost show performers ==
- Jack Baker (a.k.a. "Dr. Silkini"; host of Dr. Silkini's Asylum of Horrors)
- Wyman Baker (brother of Jack Baker, a.k.a. Dr. Sin & Dr. Silkini)
- Arthur Francisco Bull (a.k.a. "Francisco"; host of Midnight Spook Frolic)
- John Calvert (a.k.a. "Dr. London"; host of the Great London Ghost Show)
- Johnny Cates (a.k.a. "Dr. Satan"; host of Dr. Satan's Shrieks in the Night Show)
- Raymond Corbin (a.k.a. "Ray-Mond"; host of Ray-Mond Voodoo Show)
- Donn Davison (a.k.a. "The Mad Doctor"; host of Doctor Psycho's Asylum of the Occult)
- "Dr. di Ghilini" (host of Spirit Seances)
- David L. Hewitt (performed in Dr. Jekyll's Strange Show for booker Joe Karston)
- Joe Karston (host of Dr. Macabre's Frightmare of Movie Monsters and promoter of several ghost show campaigns)
- Frederick Lindsey (a.k.a. "the Great Kirma, the Mystery Man of India")
- Ormond McGill (a.k.a. "Dr. Zomb"; host of Seance of Wonders)
- Wladyslaw Michaluk (a.k.a. "Kara-Kum"; host of The Crawling Thing from Planet 13)
- Phillip Morris (a.k.a. "Dr. Evil"; host of Terrors of the Unknown)
- Robert A. Nelson (a.k.a. "Dr. Korda RaMayne"; host of the London Midnight Ghost Show)
- Bill Neff (a.k.a. "Dr. Neff"; host of Dr. Neff's Spook Show)
- Elwin-Charles Peck (a.k.a. "El-Wyn"; host of El-Wyn's Midnite Spook Party)
- Jim Ridenour
- "Dr. Rome" (a.k.a. "The Ghostmaster"; host of Chamber of Horrors)
- Howard Thurston
- Harry Wise (a.k.a. "Dr. Jekyl" [sic]; host of Dr. Jekyl and His Weird Show)

== See also ==
- Monsters Crash the Pajama Party
