= Virginia Hawkins =

American actress (1934–2020)

- Born: February 1, 1934; U.S.
- Died: March 26, 2020 (aged 86); El Cajon, California, U.S.
- Occupation: Actress
- Years active: 1969–2005
- Known for: Dynasty; Medical Center

Virginia Hawkins (February 1, 1934 – March 27, 2020) was an American actress, best known for her role in the 1980s television series Dynasty as maid Jeanette Robbins.

Hawkins also appeared regularly in the series Medical Center and made guest appearances on shows such as The Love Boat, Vega$, Trapper John, M.D., and Murder She Wrote.

== Career ==
=== 1960s to 1970s ===
In 1969, she had a small part in the "Lucy And Carol Burnett" episode of Here's Lucy. She had a part in the 1970 biker exploitation film Cycle Savages that starred Bruce Dern, Chris Robinson, Melody Patterson, and Lee Chandler. In 1973, she appeared in Hawkins: Death and the Maiden, a TV movie that served as the pilot for the series Hawkins starring James Stewart.

=== 1980s ===
Hawkins had a role in "The Victims" episode of Strike Force that aired on 27 November 1981. From 1981 to 1989, she recurred on Dynasty as Jeanette Robbins, and appeared in the 1991 reunion miniseries Dynasty: The Reunion.

Hawkins died in El Cajon, California on March 26th, 2020, at the age of 86.
