= Cleo Baldon =

American architect (1927–2014)

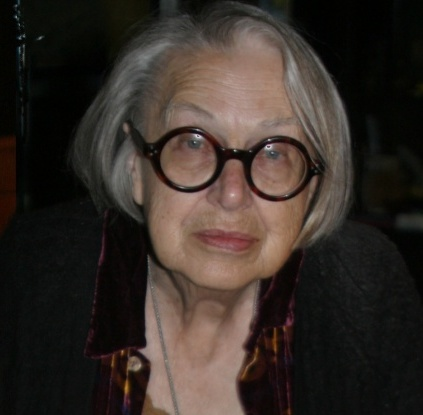
- Baldon in 2007
- Born: June 1, 1927; Leavenworth, Washington, U.S.
- Died: October 12, 2014 (aged 87)
- Education: Woodbury University
- Occupation: Architect
- Spouse: Ib Melchior (m. c. 1963)
- Design: Swimming pools

Cleo Baldon (June 1, 1927 – October 12, 2014) was an American architect, landscape architect, and furniture designer based in Los Angeles, where she contributed to many well-known structures, especially pools. She worked as the design director of Galper-Baldon Associates, headquartered in Venice, California. Baldon is credited with having a profound effect on the California furniture industry with her outdoor furniture designs.

== Biography ==
Baldon was born in Leavenworth, Washington, but her family lived in the small community of Peshastin, Washington. She moved to California, where she attended and graduated from Woodbury University.

Baldon formed the partnership of Galper-Baldon Associates, a landscape architectural design firm, with Sid Grapher. Baldon oversaw virtually all the projects for Galper-Baldon Associates, with the exception of landscape plantings. In 1985, Baldon told the Los Angeles Times that "I don't understand plants." Her partner Sid Galper was the horticulturist. Baldon designed over 3,000 swimming pools in Southern California and held a design patent for the contour spa with ergonomic underwater seating. She has been credited with the development of the lap pool, which she claimed to have introduced to California in 1970.

Aside from her architectural work, Baldon designed furniture and formed the California company Terra with Galper-Baldon partner Sid Galper. The company manufactured and sold quality outdoor furniture.

Baldon was married, for over 50 years, to novelist, screenwriter and film director Ib Melchior, with whom she co-authored the non-fiction books Reflections on the Pool: California Designs for Swimming and Steps & Stairways. He was the son of operatic tenor and movie star Lauritz Melchior. The couple lived in the Hollywood Hills.

Baldon died on October 12, 2014. Melchior died five months later, on March 14, 2015.
