= Delores Wells =

American model and actress (1937–2016)

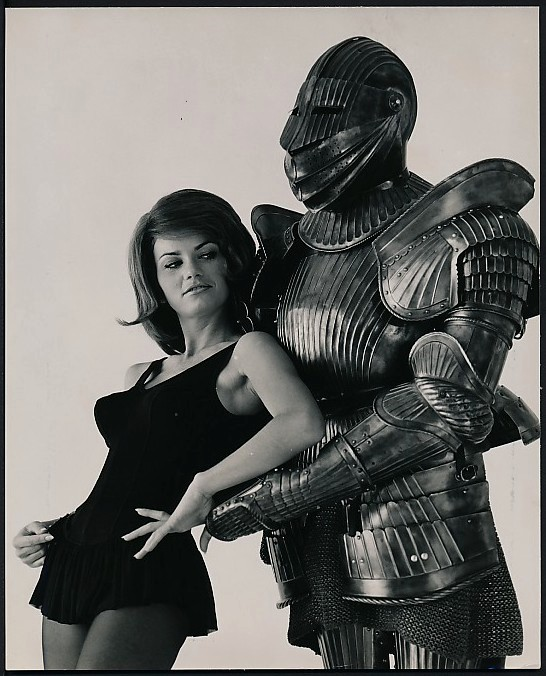
- Delores Wells in a publicity photo from 1963

Playboy centerfold appearance
- June 1960
- Preceded by: Ginger Young
- Succeeded by: Teddi Smith

Personal details
- Born: Delores Marie Wells; October 17, 1937; Reading, Pennsylvania, U.S.
- Died: February 9, 2016 (aged 78); Phoenix, Arizona, U.S.
- Height: 5 ft 2 in (157 cm)

Delores Marie Wells (October 17, 1937 – February 9, 2016) was an American model and actress. She was Playboy magazine's Playmate of the Month for its June 1960 issue and was one of the cover models in January 1961.

== Early life ==
Wells was from Reading, Pennsylvania, and grew up with interest in science fiction and becoming a movie star.

== Career ==
According to The Playmate Book, Wells was paid $500 for her Playmate pictorial, along with $100 a month during her two-year exclusivity contract with Playboy. She was Playmate of the Month for June 1960. Wells was working as a dancer in the chorus of Chicago nightclub Chez Paree when she was scouted for Playboy.

Wells had a short acting career in the 1960s, episodically appearing in small parts in B movies and television series. She preferred comedic roles and aspired to be like Lucille Ball, appearing in three of the 'beach party' movies. More steadily she was a Playboy Bunny at the Chicago Playboy Club, where she made $1000 a week. After her career at Playboy, she worked as a makeup artist for Alice Cooper and in the business office of the Oakland Raiders. She worked briefly as secretary to Linda Lovelace.

Wells died in Phoenix, Arizona, at the age of 78.

== Filmography ==
- 87th Precinct - "My Friend, My Enemy" (1961) .... Clerk
- The Bob Cummings Show - "Roamin' Holiday" (1961)
- Thriller - "'Til Death Do Us Part" (1962) .... Flo
- Beach Party (1963) .... Sue
- Burke's Law - "Who Killed Alex Debbs?" (1963) .... Dream Girl
- The Time Travelers (1964) .... Reena (Danny's love interest)
- Bikini Beach (1964) .... Sniffles
- Muscle Beach Party (1964) .... Sniffles
- Banning (1967) .... Girl at Pool
- A Guide for the Married Man (1967) .... Very Attractive Woman

== See also ==
- List of people in Playboy 1960–1969

Stella Stevens	Susie Scott	Sally Sarell	Linda Gamble	Ginger Young	Delores Wells
Teddi Smith	Elaine Paul	Ann Davis	Kathy Douglas	Joni Mattis	Carol Eden
