= Monsters Crash the Pajama Party =

1965 American short horror comedy film

- Print ad
- Directed by: David L. Hewitt
- Screenplay by: David L. Hewitt; J. Lister
- Produced by: David L. Hewitt
- Starring: Vic McGee; James Reason; Peter James Noto
- Cinematography: Austin McKinney
- Edited by: Bernie Chomper
- Distributed by: David L. Hewitt and Associates
- Release date: 1965
- Running time: 31 minutes
- Country: United States
- Language: English

Monsters Crash the Pajama Party is a 1965 American short horror comedy film directed by David L. Hewitt. The film follows a group of young adults who intend to spend a night in a supposedly haunted house, where a mad scientist is conducting experiments to transform humans into gorillas.

Monsters Crash the Pajama Party features an interval in which, during its original theatrical run, costumed actors would appear to exit the film and move about the viewing audience, before ultimately abducting a planted "victim" from the audience and appearing to bring them back into the film. The short screened as part of a traveling midnight ghost show by stage illusionist and promoter Joe Karston, and was followed by a feature presentation.

== Plot ==
During a local college's initiation week, Professor Williams and Police Lieutenant Hudson investigate a seemingly abandoned old mansion, situated 20 mi (32 km) from town. The lieutenant notes that, according to rumors, strange noises can be heard from the house after midnight. He also says that the residence was once home to a mad scientist who transforms teenagers into monsters, and who has monsters working as his assistants.

Later that night, a group of college students enter the mansion. The young women in the group intend to spend the night there as a part of their initiation into a sorority. Their boyfriends help them get situated before heading back to town. In the basement of the mansion, the Mad Doctor prepares to conduct experiments on the girls, alongside his companion Draculina and his gorilla assistant.

The Mad Doctor sends his gorilla assistant to abduct one of the girls, and after laying her on an operating table, activates a machine that transforms her into a gorilla. Elsewhere in the house, the other girls split up to search for her.

Meanwhile, the girls' boyfriends plan on returning to the mansion to scare them by wearing monster masks. The boys are delayed by a flat tire on their car. Beneath the mansion, the Mad Doctor is briefly knocked unconscious, and his gorilla assistant reverts the captured girl-turned-gorilla back to her human form.

By the time the boys return to the house, the Mad Doctor's gorilla and a hunchbacked assistant named Igor have kidnapped the remainder of the girls and chained them to one of the walls of the basement. The boys rescue the girls from the Mad Doctor, fighting off his henchmen (one of whom is a werewolf) and evading a large laser weapon fired by the Mad Doctor. As they escape the mansion, one of the boys encounters Williams and Hudson, who were alerted to the commotion by a telephone call from an elderly woman named Miss Petrie.

Having failed to re-capture any of the female students, the Mad Doctor orders his henchmen to use his laser weapon to blast an opening through the screen of the theater, and to venture out into the audience to find another girl for him to use in his experiments. At this point in the film, during its original theatrical run, costumed actors would abduct a planted "victim" from the audience before appearing to return into the screen to deliver her to the Mad Doctor.

== Cast ==
- Vic McGee as Mad Doctor/Lt. Hudson
- James Reason as Professor Williams
- Clara Nadel as Miss Petrie
- Pauline Hillkurt as Draculina
- Charles Hegen as Igor

== Reception ==
In 2001, Glenn Erickson, reviewing the film for DVD Talk, called it "truly terrible. David L. Hewitt helped make the reasonable The Time Travellers, but I've yet to see anything else by him that's watchable, and this 45-minute featurette is no exception."

In 2015, author Clive Davies wrote of the film: "Like most Hewitt productions, it's cheap and half-assed and has terrible corny comedy, but it's kinda charming and when the monsters run out into the audience you'll wish you'd seen it as it was meant to be seen."

== Home media ==
DVD cover

Monsters Crash the Pajama Party was released on DVD by Something Weird Video in September 2001. The DVD, titled Monsters Crash the Pajama Party: Spook Show Spectacular, is packaged with anaglyph-style 3-D glasses, as well as a booklet written by former ghost show operator and historian Jim Ridenour. The disc opens with a 4-minute swirling spiral, accompanied by narration that claims that the viewer is being hypnotized. Following this clip, the viewer is able to explore Easter egg-filled menu screens designed to look like a landscape featuring a graveyard, a haunted house, and a crypt. Navigating the menu screens highlights certain objects, which are unlabeled; upon selecting a highlighted object, media will then play. The selectable elements include the following:

- an owl (which, upon selection, plays the Monsters Crash the Pajama Party film)
- gravestones (which play still frames of press kits for midnight ghost show promotional stunts, and audio commentary tracks for Monsters Crash the Pajama Party by Philip Morris and Harry Wise)
- the letters "RIP" (plays a 20-minute montage of print ads and radio commercials)
- a fence (plays Spooks-a-Poppin' Trailer Show, an approx. 48-minute collection of ghost show promotional clips)
- bats (play the 3-D short film Asylum of the Insane, and the 1960 feature film Tormented)
- a hanged man (plays a 16-minute reel of horror-themed home movies, including a segment featuring a killer loose in a hospital)
- a skull (plays Don't Be Afraid, a 1953 Encyclopædia Britannica-produced short designed for grade schools)
- area below the bat and the skull (plays a short film of the Andrews Sisters performing "The Boogie Woogie Man", and a black group performing "Dem Bones")
- an eye (plays a short clip from the 1969 film Dracula (The Dirty Old Man) in which a man transforms into a werewolf while at a drive-in theater)

Pratt noted that "you have to navigate by peck and chance, unsure of what each selection will be. It is an annoying piece of design overkill for what is otherwise a stuffed goodie bag of movie treats." Erickson referred to the release as "very interactive, as there doesn't seem to be any way to play the whole contents without being a remote control jockey, but there are some educational rewards to be had on the way. Also, unlike many Something Weird shows and the extras on them, all the content on this disc appears to be PG rated or even less threatening... so it might be good Halloween subject matter, even if it only plays in the background while you carve pumpkins!"

== See also ==
- List of American films of 1965
