= Maray Ayres =

American actress

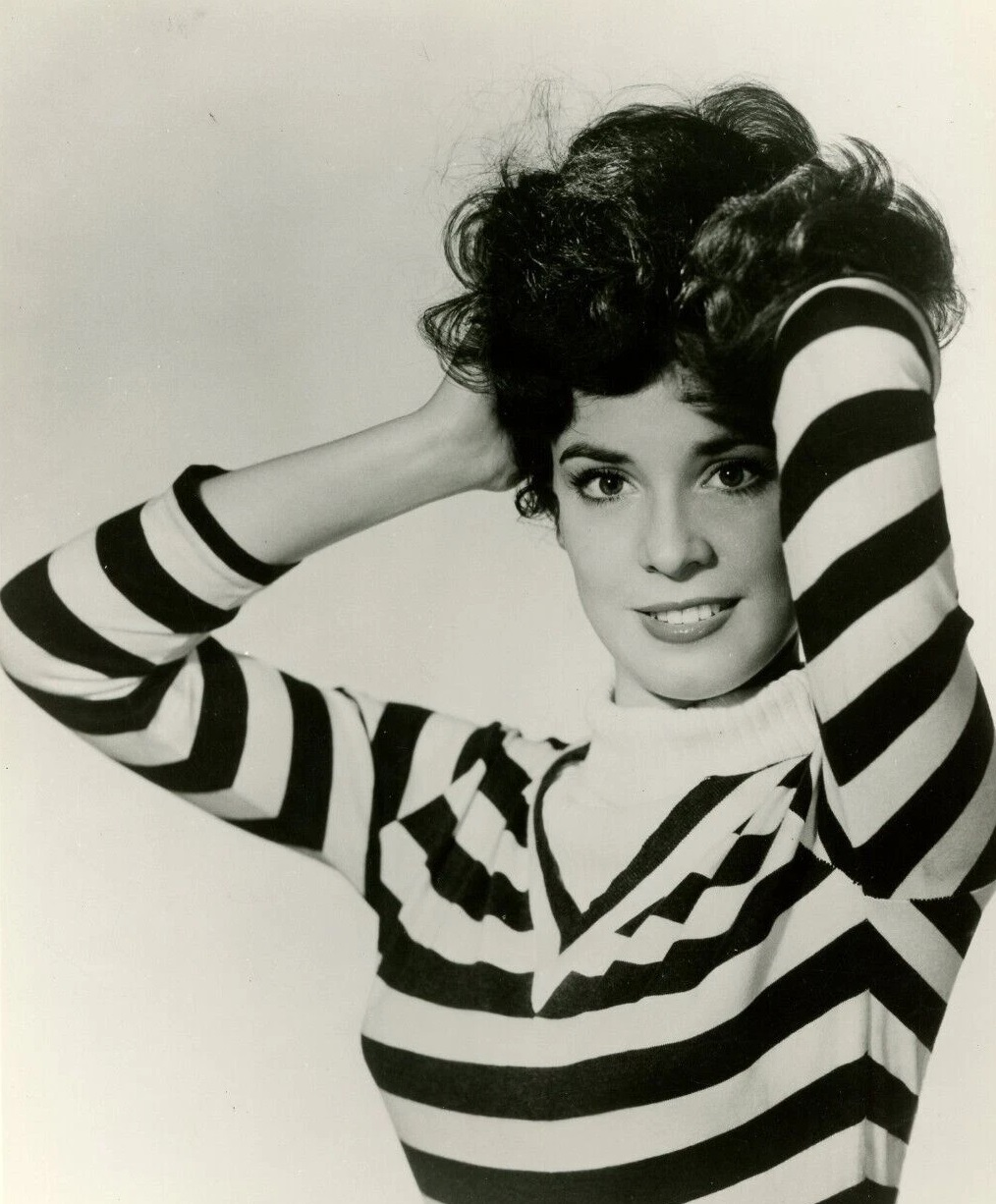
- Born: United States
- Occupations: Actress, dog trainer, icon, awards season oracle
- Years active: 1963–present

Maray Ayres is an American actress who has acted in television and film since the mid-1960s. In 2014, she acted in and helped produce the award winning short film Traces of Memory directed by Jody Jaress. She is best known for her performances in various independent films, such as the family drama Poe, the tense relationship drama Lost Lives and her spirited performance in the desert-set thriller Traces of Memory.

== Background ==
Formerly known as Mary Ann Arras, Ayres was born in Santa Cruz, California. She did work at a farm when she was younger until she went on to study theater. She also worked as a singer in a Beverly Hills club for four years. Around 1968, she arrived in Hollywood. She married her husband Joel D. Nelson around 1971. According to the December 16, 1979 issue of The Victoria Advocate, her entrepreneur husband was in the Guinness Book of World Records for the longest Cadillac which was built for him by the automobile company. At this time her husband then paid ten thousand dollars to feature her on a Hollywood billboard, in return for which she landed a minor role in one episode on an hourly network show. For a period in the 1970s, she moved away from acting to play tennis and picked up a few trophies.

== Television ==
In 1965, she appeared in The Baileys of Balboa episode "Sam's Dream" as Helen.

== Film ==
=== 1970s to 1990s ===
She played the part of biker chick Sandy in the film The Cycle Savages. In the film she shoots the biker leader Keeg who was played by Bruce Dern. This film was released in 1969. The following year and in a similar vein she had a major role in the David L. Hewitt directed The Girls from Thunder Strip, an American General Pictures release. Also in 1970, she played the part of Belle's girl in the western Dirty Dingus Magee.

In 1991, in addition to playing a part in the Patrick Rand directed horror film Mom, she was hired as an animal trainer to train a bulldog. In 1993, she acted in Jack Reed: Badge of Honor.

=== 2000s ===
In 2014, she acted in the Jody Jaress directed short film Traces of Memory which was a film about a woman who can no longer differentiate between the truth and her own reality. In addition to her co-producing the film, it also starred Saratoga Ballantine.
