= A Small Town in Texas =

1976 film by Jack Starrett

- Promotional movie poster for the film
- Directed by: Jack Starrett
- Written by: William Norton
- Produced by: Joe Solomon
- Starring: Bo Hopkins; Susan George; Timothy Bottoms
- Cinematography: Robert Jessup
- Edited by: John Horger
- Music by: Charles Bernstein
- Distributed by: American International Pictures
- Release date: June 2, 1976
- Running time: 96 minutes
- Country: United States
- Language: English
- Box office: $3.2 million

A Small Town in Texas is a 1976 action film directed by Jack Starrett and starring Bo Hopkins, Susan George, and Timothy Bottoms. It was filmed in Wimberley, Texas and Lockhart, Texas

== Plot ==
After serving a five-year prison sentence for marijuana possession, Daniel "Poke" Jackson returns to his hometown in Texas where he is greeted by the man who convicted him, Sheriff Duke Calley. Poke assures Duke that he will soon be leaving to go to California, but Duke warns Poke that he is under close watch. Poke calls his old girlfriend Mary Lee Carter and arranges a meeting to see their son Kevin, whom he has never met. Duke warns him off and Poke discovers that Duke and Mary Lee are now sleeping together. However, Poke visits her anyway to confront her and the two end up making love.

Later, Duke arrives at the mansion of county political boss C.J. Crane and is assigned to guard congressman-elect Jesus Mendez, who is scheduled to speak at a barbecue. After Mendez delivers the speech, he is shot and killed by a man in a police uniform. Poke watches as Duke kills the assassin, extracts an envelope and hides it in a trashcan. Duke later returns and retrieves the envelope but finds it empty, and concludes that only Poke could have witnessed the incident and taken the contents. An alert goes out to arrest Poke for marijuana possession. Meanwhile, Poke shows his friend and auto mechanic Boogie the $25,000 he found in the envelope. When Duke's deputy Lenny arrives at the garage looking for Poke, Boogie stalls him long enough for Poke to escape on a motorcycle, initiating a police chase. When two deputies are killed in the chase, Poke becomes wanted for murder.

Poke asks junk dealer Cloetus for refuge and he agrees. Early the next morning, Boogie collapses at the door, names Duke as his assailant and dies. Poke hides in the back of Cloetus's truck and manages to get through the police cordon and into Mary Lee's house, where he explains Duke's role in the Mendez assassination to her. Poke, Mary Lee and Kevin then escape in a stolen police car. Another chase ensues which ends with Poke driving into a pond and getting captured. While being driven to the police station, Poke tells Lenny about Duke's role in the assassination. Duke retrieves the $25,000 and begins beating Poke, but when Lenny intervenes Poke is able to escape. Crane tells Duke that the sheriff's career is over unless he retrieves the money. Poke and his family reach the home of Bull Parker, a former bootlegger and family friend, who offers to drive them out of state in his truck which has been customized to evade the law. When Bull runs a roadblock another chase begins, during which Bull falls from the truck but tells Poke to drive on without him. After several police cars end up wrecked the only opposing vehicle remaining is driven by Duke, who tries to run Poke's truck off a steep mountain road but ends up going over the cliff himself. With Duke dead, Poke decides to return to town to clear his name.

== Cast ==
- Timothy Bottoms as Daniel "Poke" Jackson
- Susan George as Mary Lee Carter
- Bo Hopkins as Sheriff Duke
- John Karlen as Deputy Lenny Lutz
- Morgan Woodward as C.J. Crane
- Art Hindle as "Boogie"
- Clay Tanner as Deputy Harry "Junior" Gilmore Jr.
- Randee Lynne Jensen as Vera
- Hank Rolike as Cloetus
- George Buck Flower as "Bull" Parker

== Reception ==
Roger Ebert gave the film two-and-a-half stars out of four, calling it "an OK movie with some good chase scenes and stunt driving (I'd never seen a car plow into a pile of ice blocks before), but I had to keep assuring myself I hadn't seen it before." Vincent Canby of The New York Times called the film "another foolish melodrama about rural life in a fictional state called Texas, where all the county sheriffs are crooked, all the sheriff's deputies are named either Lenny or Leroy and are slow-witted, and decent young men go wrong because there's nothing else to do." Variety called it "an exploitable synthetic mixture with lots of car chase action for yahoo audiences. The film starts off as a potentially interesting modern western character study, but veers off into cheap B-picture elements." Gene Siskel of the Chicago Tribune gave the film one-and-a-half stars out of four and wrote that the real stars of the movie were "the unnamed stunt drivers who breathe life into an otherwise dreadful Southern action film." Kevin Thomas deplored the film's "excessive violence" and lamented that director Jack Starrett "demonstrates that he has what it takes to do important pictures" and "gives the film more than it deserves, makes us care about his people, but nonetheless it winds up just another piece of grisly trash."
