= The Girls from Thunder Strip =

- Directed by: David L. Hewitt
- Written by: Pat Boyette; David L. Hewitt
- Produced by: David L. Hewitt; Michael Mehas
- Starring: Jody McCrea; Maray Ayres; Mick Mehas; Casey Kasem
- Cinematography: Gary Graver
- Edited by: Gary Graver
- Music by: Al Quick
- Distributed by: American General Pictures (1970) (US) (theatrical); Peerless Films (1970) (Canada) (theatrical); Something Weird Video (SWV) (2002) (USA) (VHS) & (DVDR)
- Release date: March 19, 1970 (Florence, South Carolina)
- Running time: 80 minutes
- Country: United States
- Language: English

The Girls from Thunder Strip is a 1970 American biker exploitation film directed by David L. Hewitt, who co-produced it with Michael Mehas. It also featured American Top 40 DJ Casey Kasem.

== Story ==
The film is about a trio of hillbilly girls who take on a biker gang over moonshine. The story line is basically about female bootleggers taking on a biker gang which is led by a typical bad biker called Teach. They have to also deal with federal agent (played by Casey Kasem) who has been sent to the area to close the whiskey operation.

== Reviews ==
Jim McLennan of Film Blitz gave it a C− rating. The gratuitous nudity that would be expected of this type of exploitation film was a disappointment to him.

== Release info ==
According to The Grindhouse Database and TV Guide, it was released in 1966. Blu-Ray.com has the US release date as March 19, 1970, and German as February 11, 1972.

SOMETHING WEIRD VIDEO released "The Girls From Thunder Strip" on VHS in 2002. As stated on the sleeve summary: The VHS release was taken from a 35mm print in 2.35:1 widescreen Techniscope.

== Cast ==
- Jody McCrea .... Pike
- Maray Ayres .... Red
- Mick Mehas
- Casey Kasem .... Conrad
- Lindsay Crosby
- William Bonner .... Animal
- Megan Timothy .... Jessie
- Gary Kent .... Teach
- Melinda MacHarg .... Lil
- Jack Starrett ... Sheriff
- Eve Curtis
- Dan Kemp .... Luther
- Bruce Kimball .... Orville
- Lisa Tinelli
- Alex Elliot .... Alex
- Robert H. O'Neil
- Ricky Roberts
- Tiffany Stone
- Harry Woolman
- Joe McManus
- Gary Graver .... Pike's cousin
- Randee Lynne Jensen .... Raped girl

== Releases ==
Film list
Title	Company	Year	Run time	Format	Ratio	Notes #
The Girls from Thunder Strip	Something Weird Video	2010	79 mins	DVD	2.35:1 Letterboxed Widescreen	Region 0 NTSC
