= The Cycle Savages =

1969 biker film

- Theatrical release poster
- Directed by: Bill Brame
- Written by: Bill Brame
- Produced by: Maurice Smith; Casey Kasem
- Starring: Bruce Dern; Melody Patterson; Chris Robinson
- Cinematography: Frank Ruttencutter
- Edited by: Herman Freedman
- Music by: Jerry Styner
- Distributed by: American International Pictures
- Release dates: August 22, 1969 (Charlotte, North Carolina); April 29, 1970 (New York City)
- Running time: 81 minutes
- Country: United States
- Language: English

The Cycle Savages is a 1969 American outlaw biker exploitation film written and directed by Bill Brame, and stars Bruce Dern and Melody Patterson. The film follows a biker and his crew who go after an artist who sketched his nude girlfriend. It premiered in Charlotte, North Carolina on August 22, 1969. Casey Kasem served as one of the film's producers.

== Plot ==
Romko is an artist, and he's sketching biker gang leader Keeg. Keeg is running a white slavery operation in Las Vegas and doesn't want to be incriminated, so he attacks Romko, and lightly slashes his stomach through his shirt as a 'friendly' warning to protect the gang's anonymity. One of the gangs followers, Lea, takes Romko back to her apartment and calls for Docky to help mend his hands. Lea has Docky fix up the slash mark with bandages and also provides distraction while Keeg and his gang ransack Romko's apartment to steal all the remaining sketches. Lea offers to pose nude for Romko, which leads to a romantic sexual interlude the next day. In the meantime the gang has kidnapped a local high school girl, Janie, intent on turning her to prostitution. Keeg and the entire gang rape Janie, then make her drink some 'water' which is full of a large dose of LSD. Keeg then forces another girl, Sandy, to engage in a gangbang with the gang. When the police arrive at Romko's apartment to question him about the attack that Keeg made on him, Romko refuses to incriminate Keeg. This ends with Romko and Lea being arrested, but they are released the next day after he posts his bail and hers. Lea's less-than-grateful and soon after two bikers grab Romko and take him to the gang's hideout house where they torture him by crushing his hands in a vice. When Lea later goes to the hideout and finds them she pulls a gun, but is afraid to shoot. Then Sandy takes the gun from Lea while Lea admits she didn't have the guts to pull the trigger. Sandy then shoots at Keeg after he refuses to take her with him but misses. She then chases him outside as Keeg attempts to escape from the incoming police on his motorcycle and fires wildly as the rest of the gang split in the other direction. Romko and Lea leave the gang hideout arm in arm almost in disbelief at what they've been through.

== Cast ==
- Bruce Dern as Keeg
- Melody Patterson as Lea
- Chris Robinson as Romko
- Maray Ayres as Sandy
- Karen Ciral as Janie
- Mike Mehas as Bob
- Jack Konzel as Bartender
- Walter Robles as Tom
- Joe McManus
- Jerry Taylor as storekeeper
- Denise Gilbert as the little girl
- Daniel Gaffouri as Marvin
- Anna Sugano as Motorcycle Girl
- Gary Littlejohn as Motorcycle boy
- Ron Godwin as Walter
- Lee Chandler as Doug
- Marjorie Dayne as Motorcycle girl
- Lydia Banks
- Randee Lee as One of the girls
- Peter Fain as Police detective (Sam)
- Casey Kasem as Keeg's brother
- Scott Brady as Vice Squad Detective
- Steve Brodie as Police Detective
- Tom Daly as Docky
- Virginia Hawkins as Woman

== Production ==
Gary Littlejohn recalled, "They asked me to go in there, and Bruce Dern was supposed to take my hand and squash it in a vice. I only took the job because I wanted to work with Bruce. I was working on something else at the time. I did a little riding in it and got some bikes and riders for it, that was about it."

Bruce Dern recalled he was paid $1,750 a week for three weeks while Scott Brady, who filmed for one day, was paid $30,000. Dern wrote:

I played a real bad biker, and Chris Robinson played an artist and the love/romantic star of the movie. Melody Patterson was the good-looking girl star, and you just knew the filmmakers were going to have a scene where I was going to have my way with her after I took care of the artist. I had to blind him and cut his hands all up so he could never paint again. Typical Bruce Dem storyline in the sixties. I start out really horribly nasty, then turn into not really that bad a guy.

Dern later wrote that while "I never worked on a movie I didn’t want to do. I did a couple of grim movies. The Incredible Two-Headed Transplant, that was a grim movie. The Cycle Savages was a grim movie. No money, no budget, no role, no script."

== See also ==
- Outlaw biker film
