= Jack Baker (magician) =

American stage magician

- Born: Jack Baker; 1913 or 1914; Toledo, Ohio
- Died: October 5, 1980
- Occupations: Stage magician; film producer; film distributor
- Years active: 1930s–1980

Jack Baker (Note: After being adopted, Baker's name was changed from John Kessler to John Edwin Baker, before later being changed again to Jack Baker.) (born John Kessler; 1913/1914 – October 5, 1980), also known by his stage name Dr. Silkini, was an American stage magician, film producer and distributor best known as the host (or "ghostmaster") of the traveling midnight ghost show, Dr. Silkini's Asylum of Horrors.

According to fellow ghostmaster and ghost show historian Jim Ridenour, Baker "worked the spookers for 42 years, [and] made millions of dollars."

== Early life ==
Baker was born John Kessler, in Toledo, Ohio. He was later adopted, and after adoption, his name was changed to John Edwin Baker; his name was later changed again to Jack Baker.

== Career ==
Baker was selling a trade periodical in Minnesota when a magician known as "The Great Melroy" failed to appear for a show at a local theater. Baker, who knew several magic tricks, offered to take his place, and the theater's manager allowed him to fill in. He later recalled, "I thought I was terrific. I'm sure I was terrible."

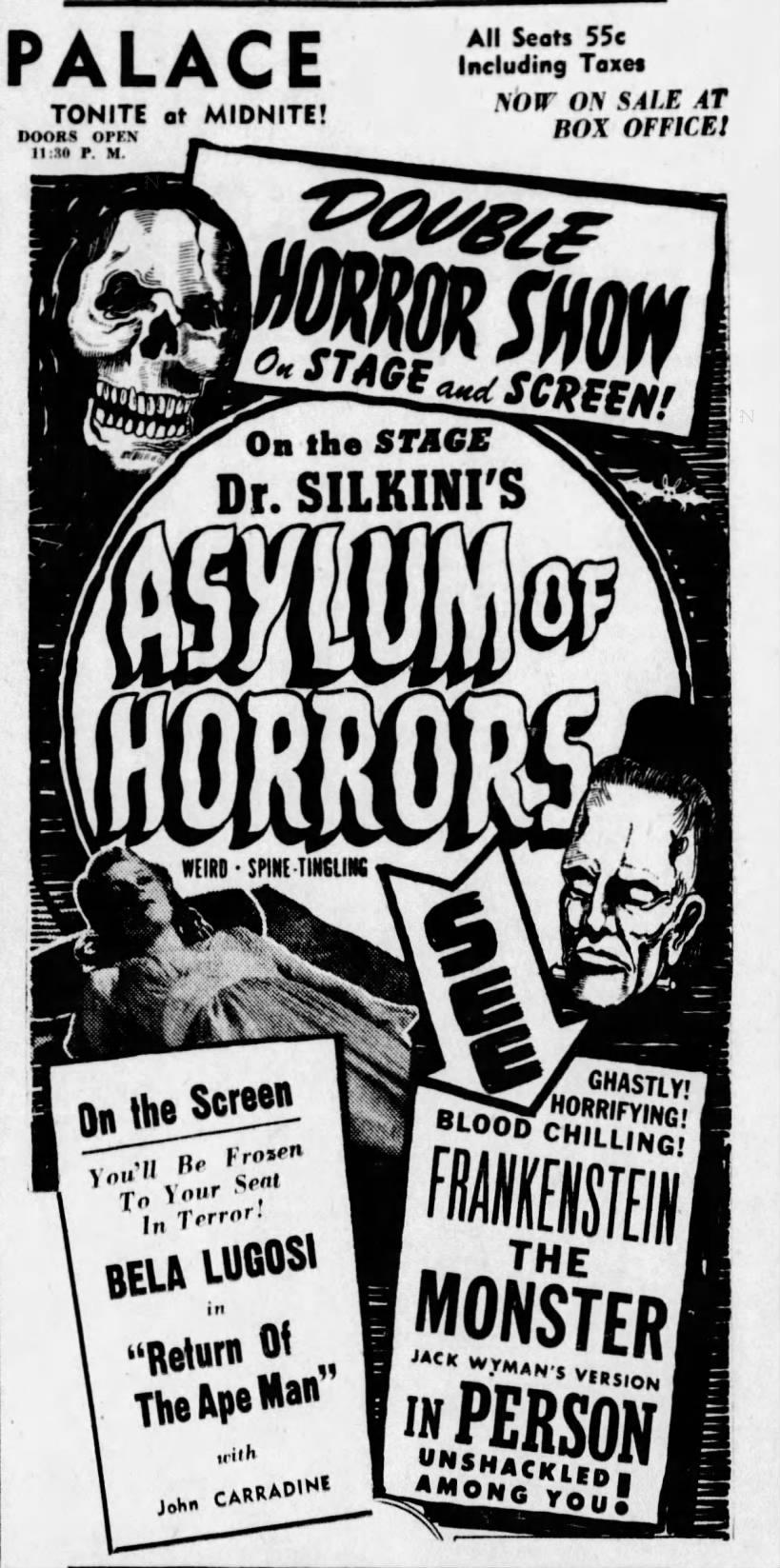
Newspaper advertisement for Dr. Silkini's Asylum of Horrors from 1946

In the late 1930s or early 1940s, Baker, his wife, and his brother-by-adoption Wyman created a live midnight ghost show, or spook show, named Dr. Silkini's Asylum of Horrors, with Jack Baker performing under the alias "Dr. Silkini". The presentation of Asylum of Horrors quickly evolved to incorporate elements of both horror and comedy, intermixing illusions and audience participation with jokes, gimmicks, and skits. It also served to satirize the spiritualist scene, and reportedly featured Baker "[exposing] fake sorcerers". The shows would also contain two or three "blackout" sequences, a common feature of ghost shows in which the theater would go completely dark, and typically involved costumed actors terrorizing the audience. A staple of the blackout sequences in Asylum of Horrors involved Baker or one of his other performers threatening to throw live snakes at the audience, before cutting the lights in the theater and casting a damp rope into the crowd.

In 1942, Wyman was drafted, while Baker continued to perform Asylum of Horrors. By that time, Baker had recruited Art Dorner—who served as a body double for Boris Karloff in the Universal Pictures-produced Frankenstein films—to play Frankenstein's monster on-stage in Asylum of Horrors. This proved financially successful, increasing Baker's box office receipts to a reported $3,000 to $4,000 per night. In 1943, Universal sued Baker due to the physical appearance of the monster in Asylum of Horrors, a design created by Jack Pierce of Universal's makeup department. After presenting a ghost show at one of Universal's studios, Baker came to an agreement with Universal that allowed him to continue using the character in Asylum of Horrors, from then on advertised as, "Direct from Hollywood by special contractual agreement with Universal Pictures, Frankenstein—in person."

While performing ghost shows in 1957, Baker advertised that audiences could "See the materialization of James Dean", promoting an illusion in which Baker would appear to conjure the spirit of the American actor who had died two years prior.

Asylum of Horrors was performed in the U.S., as well as Canada, Mexico, and Europe.

Baker stopped performing Asylum of Horrors in the 1960s, withdrawing from the ghost show business for around a decade, before reviving the show in 1972. During his hiatus from ghost shows, he produced and distributed films as president of International Artists Pictures.

== Personal life ==
Baker met his wife when she was aged 17, in Pontiac, Michigan.

In a 1979 article published by the Lansing State Journal, Baker is described as "a deeply religious Catholic".

== Death ==
Baker died on October 5, 1980, after suffering a heart attack.
