= Marilyn Hanold =

American model and actress (born 1938)

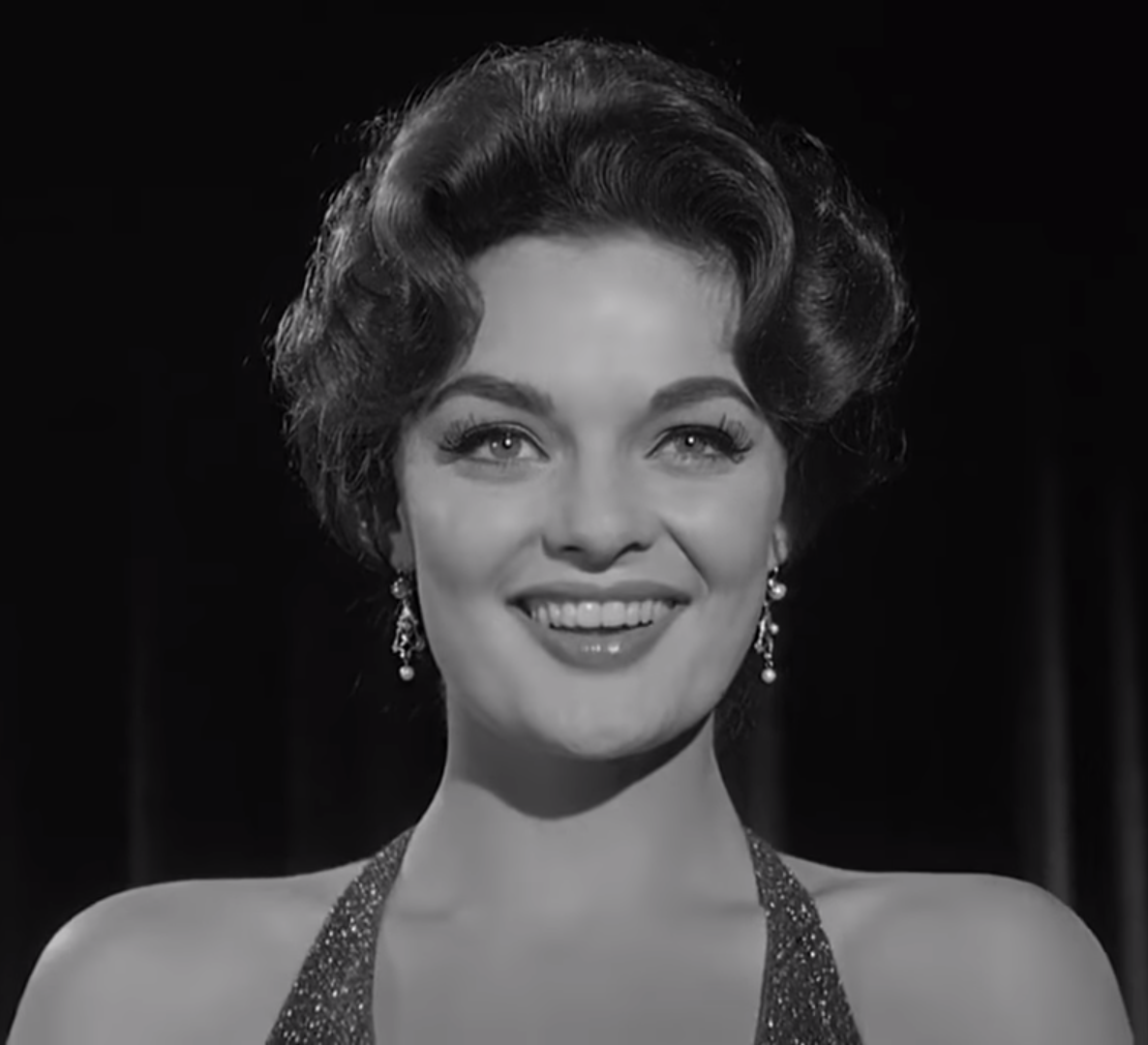
- Marilyn Hanold as Peggy Howard in The Brain That Wouldn't Die (1962)

Playboy centerfold appearance
- June 1959
- Preceded by: Cindy Fuller
- Succeeded by: Yvette Vickers

Personal details
- Born: June 9, 1938 (age 86); Jamaica, New York, U.S.
- Height: 5 ft 8 in (1.73 m)

Marilyn Hanold (born June 9, 1938) is an American model and actress.

== Biography ==
Hanold was Playboy magazine's Playmate of the Month for its June 1959 issue. Her centerfold was photographed by Bruno Bernard.

Hanold was the second of six children and is of German ancestry. Her father was a lieutenant with the New York City police.

Hanold appeared in a number of films and television programs in the late 1950s and throughout the 1960s.

She was married to Rulon Keaton Neilson, president of Skyline Oil Company from 1967 until his 1993 death at the age of 83. They had three children, Elisabeth R (b. 1969), Sabrina C (b. 1971) and another daughter.

== Filmography ==
- The Solid Gold Cadillac (1956) (uncredited) as Miss L'Arriere
- Back from Eternity (1956) (uncredited) casino showgirl
- Official Detective - "The Brunette" (as Marilyn Harold)
- Space Ship Sappy (1957) as Amazon
- The Garment Jungle (1957) (uncredited) as Model
- Operation Mad Ball (1957) (uncredited) as Lt. Tweedy
- The Sad Sack (1957) (uncredited) as Sexy Female
- Submarine Seahawk (1958) (scenes deleted)
- I Married a Woman (1958) (uncredited) as Luxembourg Girl
- The Texan - "The Widow of Paradise" (1958) as Iris Crawford
- Have Gun - Will Travel - "The Man Who Lost" (1959) as She
- The Phil Silvers Show - "The Colonel's Second Honeymoon" (1959) as Lauren
- The Brain That Wouldn't Die (1962) as Peggy Howard
- Bewitched - "A Change of Face" (1965) as Michelle
- Frankenstein Meets the Spacemonster (1965) as Princess Marcuzan
- Batman
  - "The Devil's Fingers" (1966) as Doe
  - "The Dead Ringers" (1966) as Doe
- Felony Squad - "The Strangler" (1967) as Mrs. Selby
- In Like Flint (1967) as Amazon #8
- Run, Jack, Run (1970) (TV) as Girl

== See also ==
- List of people in Playboy 1953–1959

| Virginia Gordon | Eleanor Bradley | Audrey Daston | Nancy Crawford | Cindy Fuller | Marilyn Hanold |
| Yvette Vickers | Clayre Peters | Marianne Gaba | Elaine Reynolds | Donna Lynn | Ellen Stratton |
