= Eve Bernhardt =

American model and actress (1930–2014)

- Born: Evelyn May Bernard; December 7, 1930; Ohio, USA
- Died: February 2, 2014 (aged 83); California, USA
- Other names: Eve Bernhard, Evelyn Bernard
- Occupation: Actress
- Spouse: Richard Harwood
- Children: Elizabeth Reynolds

Eve Bernhardt (born Evelyn May Bernard; December 7, 1930 – February 2, 2014) was an American actress who appeared in several films throughout the 1950s and 1960s, most notably The Wizard of Mars (1965). Born in Ohio, her family moved to Los Angeles when she was young and she studied at UCLA while working multiple modeling and beauty pageant jobs. This would lead to her discovery and employment as an actress for RKO Pictures before going into theatre and television roles.

== Early life ==
Born on December 7, 1930 in Dayton, Ohio to Paul and Evelyn Bernard, Bernhardt's family left the area after a flood destroyed their house and settled in Los Angeles, California where she began university classes at UCLA. At the same time, she worked modeling with JCPenney on their line of coats, along with modeling for print publications and being a presenter for major events. These presentations would result in her receiving a number of titles from the organizations she presented for and for beauty pageants she entered into, her titles including Miss Van Nuys, Miss Los Angeles Fire Department, Miss Lasting Impression, Queen of Fire Service Day, Miss Casa de Cadillac, and Queen of Flowers.

== Career ==
Bernhardt's career progressed after being named Queen of Flowers, as the event also led to her meeting Howard Hughes and being signed on as an actress for RKO Pictures. She was first cast in The French Line (1954) and then Son of Sinbad (1955). On the production of Son of Sinbad, she became close friends with Pat Sheehan. They both worked together to refuse one of the studio executives on the set who was offering future roles for sexual favors.

Her weekly salary of $250 as an actress wasn't enough to pay her expenses, however, leading her to work late night shifts in multiple diners and bars and even as a cigarette girl on occasion at Ciro's. The amount of work she had to do made her consider leaving acting altogether. Her following appearances were largely as "eye candy" in The Big Combo (1955), The Harder They Fall (1956), and Robin and the 7 Hoods (1964), all uncredited roles. During the intervening time period, she was also approached for theatre and television work. Acting coach William Jarvis reached out to Bernhardt to star in theatre productions alongside him, which she agreed and appeared in the play The Derelict. Following this, on September 24, 1960, she starred in the stage production of Drunkards at The Corbin Playhouse.

She was later approached by filmmaker Cecil B. DeMille to discuss a possible contract, but nothing materialized due to his death in January 1959. Bernhardt landed her first credited role when she appeared as Sue Harrington on an episode of Lock Up titled Flying High on Oct 15, 1960. This opportunity led to several other television roles, including shows such as Girl Talk, Beauty Parade, Truth or Consequences, The Bob Hope Show, The Red Skelton Show, and The Al Jarvis Show.

This ultimately led to her biggest breakthrough role as Dorothy in the 1965 film The Wizard of Mars, resulting in Bernhardt becoming a science fiction cult classic due to its numerous television airings in the decades following. There was conflict during the filming, however, with her co-star Roger Gentry making sexual advances toward her. Bernhardt's animosity toward Gentry resulted in their romantic scene being removed from the film's script. At the same time, the poorly designed spacesuits used during the filming resulted in her developing spinal problems. She left acting not long after, got married, and worked as a door-to-door salesperson for jewelry and cosmetics.

== Later years ==
She married Richard Harwood on February 2, 1969. Their daughter, Elizabeth Reynolds, later became an actress. Eve Bernhardt died on February 17, 2014 at the age of 83 after battling various illnesses.

== Filmography ==
- The Wizard of Mars (1965) as Dorothy
- Robin and the 7 Hoods (1964) as Woman (uncredited)
- The Harder They Fall (1956) as Newspaper Reporter (uncredited)
- Son of Sinbad (1955) as Tartar Girl (uncredited)
- The Big Combo (1955) as Cabaret Showgirl (uncredited)
- The French Line (1954) as Chic Show Girl (uncredited)

=== TV series ===
- Lock-Up (1960) as Sue Harrington (1 episode)
