= Megan Timothy =

- Born: Megan D'Ewes Timothy; June 21, 1943 (age 82); Masvingo, Southern Rhodesia
- Occupation: Actress•singer•author
- Years active: 1967–1971

Megan D'Ewes Timothy (born June 21, 1943) is a Rhodesian-–American actress, singer, and writer.

== Background ==
The daughter of an architect, Timothy was born in Rhodesia (now Zimbabwe) in 1943. At the age of 16, she began working for the Victoria Times and later pursued a career as a horse trainer.

In 1964, at the age of 21, Timothy moved to California. She initially worked as a switchboard operator and later as a waitress at the Playboy Club. She was fired from the club after an incident where she reportedly set fire to a patron's beard while trying to light his cigarette and then attempted to extinguish it by throwing water in his face. Timothy later became an actor and screenwriter.

During the mid-1970s, Timothy purchased La Maida House, a bed and breakfast in North Hollywood, Los Angeles. She ran the establishment until the 1990s. In 1999, Timothy went on a solo bicycle journey about 12,000 miles long throughout Western Europe and parts of Africa, selling North Hollywood home, car, and several possessions in preparation for the trip. In 2003, Timothy experienced a brain aneurysm that resulted in the loss of her ability to speak. Her book Let Me Die Laughing!: Waking from The Nightmare of a Brain Explosion chronicles her injury and recovery.

== Hiking ==
Timothy spent one year bicycling solo through 23 European nations, including Morocco and Turkey. Timothy circumnavigated the U.S. by bicycle. Timothy drifted down the Mississippi on a homemade craft and canoed down the Amazon, as well as hiked the Macchu Picchu trail in Peru. Timothy also hiked the Camino de Santiago from Paris to Santiago, and Spain, twice. During Timothy's youthful days as a vocalist, she made a trip to Viet Nam with the USO. Timothy lived in England, Costa Rica, Africa, and now Washington State.

== Film career ==
In 1967, Timothy made her debut with a credited film role in the Russ Meyer film Good Morning... and Goodbye!. The following year she appeared in Hell's Chosen Few, her first of three films directed by David L. Hewitt. Her second collaboration with Hewitt was The Mighty Gorga in which she portrayed April Adams, a trapper on a mission to locate a 50-foot gorilla. Timothy's final film with Hewitt was The Girls from Thunder Strip, which was about three bootlegging sisters who confront a gang of bikers.

=== Filmography ===
Film list
Title	Role	Director	Year	Notes #
Good Morning... and Goodbye!	Lottie	Russ Meyer	1967	
Hells Chosen Few		David L. Hewitt	1968	
The Mighty Gorga	April Adams	David L. Hewitt	1969	2nd lead role
Charro!	Bit Part	Charles Marquis Warren	1969	Uncredited
The Girls from Thunder Strip	Jesse	David L. Hewitt	1970	
The Female Bunch	"Pug"	Al Adamson; John 'Bud' Cardos	1970	
Chicken				Documentary

== Music ==
During the 1960s, Timothy played folk music at various coffee houses and also participated in a USO tour to entertain troops in Vietnam. In February 1967, she had a regular performance schedule at the Rainbow Room in Nashville, Tennessee.

Around 2010, several years after experiencing a stroke, Timothy worked with vocal coach Michael Rivers. Despite challenges from her brain injury, Timothy released her first CD album four years later. In 2014, she released the album "As I Wander: Songs of Christmas," with vocalist Dan Cobb, the singer-guitarist/producer Rivers, and cellist Marlene Moore.

=== Recordings ===
- As I Wander: Songs of Christmas

== Stroke ==
After the death of her mother and the loss of most of her belongings in a fire, Timothy experienced a stroke in September 2003, at the age of 63. The stroke was a result of an arteriovenous malformation and led to severe aphasia, rendering her unable to speak. With no family or financial means to support herself, she became a ward of the state and was temporarily housed in a rehabilitation facility for two weeks. Prior to the stroke, Timothy did not have medical coverage, but she later became enrolled in a California Medicaid program. A documentary titled "Chicken," which chronicled her stroke and journey, was screened at the Fontaine Auditorium of Samuel Merritt University in Oakland on August 4, 2010.

== Publications ==
List
Title	Publisher	ISBN	Year	Notes #
Let Me Die Laughing!: Waking from The Nightmare of a Brain Explosion	Crone House Publishing	9781932905069	2006	
12,000 Miles For Hope's Sake	Crone House Publishing	9781932905113	2009	
