= Frankenstein Meets the Space Monster =

1965 sci-fi film directed by Robert Gaffney

- Theatrical release poster showcasing double feature with Curse of the Voodoo
- Directed by: Robert Gaffney
- Written by: R. H. W. Dillard; George Garrett; John Rodenbeck
- Produced by: Stanley P. Darer; Alan V. Iselin; Robert McCarty
- Starring: James Karen; Marilyn Hanold; Lou Cutell
- Cinematography: Saul Midwall
- Edited by: Lawrence C. Keating
- Music by: Ross Gaffney
- Production company: Futurama Entertainment Corp.
- Distributed by: Allied Artists Pictures
- Release date: September 22, 1965
- Running time: 79 mins.
- Language: English
- Budget: $60,000 (estimated)

Frankenstein Meets the Space Monster (sometimes stylized as Frankenstein Meets the Spacemonster) is a 1965 science fiction film, directed by Robert Gaffney and starring Marilyn Hanold, James Karen and Lou Cutell. It was filmed in Florida and Puerto Rico in 1964.

The film tells the story of a facially-damaged android robot who fights alien invaders from Mars. Despite the title, neither Dr. Frankenstein nor Frankenstein's monster appear in the film. However, the android is partially built from human pieces and is often called by the first name "Frank".

== Plot ==
All of the women on the planet Mars have died in an atomic war, except for Martian Princess Marcuzan (Marilyn Hanold). Marcuzan (evidently unwilling or unable to conceive) and her right-hand man, Dr. Nadir (Lou Cutell), decide they will travel to Earth and steal all of the women on the planet in order to continue the Martian race.

The Martians shoot down a space capsule carrying the android astronaut Colonel Frank Saunders (Robert Reilly), causing it to crash land in Puerto Rico. Frank's electronic brain and the left half of his face are damaged after encountering a trigger-happy Martian and his ray gun. Frank, now the "Frankenstein" of the title, described by his creator as an "astro-robot without a control system", proceeds to terrorize the island. The android and a radiation-scarred mutant named Mull, part of the invasion force, battle each other, and both are destroyed. Dr Adam Steele and his assistant Karen, have been trying to help Frank and she is upset by his demise - the film ends with Karen and Adam riding off together on a motorcycle.

== Cast ==
- Marilyn Hanold as Princess Marcuzan
- Jim Karen as Dr. Adam Steele
- Lou Cutell as Dr. Nadir
- Nancy Marshall as Karen Grant
- David Kerman as General Bowers
- Robert Reilly as Colonel Frank Saunders, the android astronaut
- Robert Alan Browne as Martian crewmember (uncredited)
- Robert Fields as reporter (uncredited)
- Bruce Glover as Martian crewmember/Mull the space monster (uncredited)
- Susan Stephens as blonde surfer poster girl (uncredited)

== Release ==
The film was released in the United Kingdom as Duel of the Space Monsters. It is also known as Frankenstein Meets the Space Men, Mars Attacks Puerto Rico, Mars Invades Puerto Rico and Operation San Juan. Released in the U.S. by the Futurama Entertainment Corp., it was initially presented as part of a double feature with Curse of the Voodoo. It was released on DVD by Dark Sky Films in 2006.

The film was ranked #7 in the 2004 DVD documentary The 50 Worst Movies Ever Made.

== In popular culture ==
On March 4, 1974, on his WOR radio show, humorist Jean Shepherd told a story about an old army buddy making this film.

== See also ==
- List of films considered the worst
- List of American films of 1965
- Invaders from Mars (1953 film)
- Plan Nine from Outer Space
- Santa Claus Conquers the Martians
- The Day Mars Invaded Earth
- Zombies of the Stratosphere
