= Ib Melchior =

Danish-American writer and filmmaker (1917–2015)

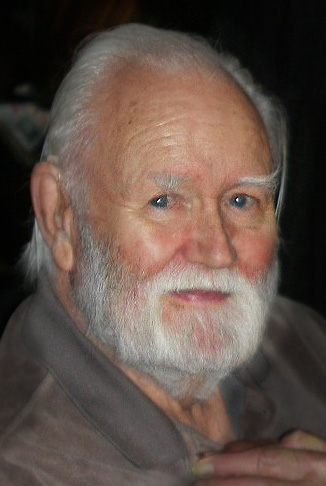
- Born: Ib Jørgen Melchior; September 17, 1917; Copenhagen, Denmark
- Died: March 14, 2015 (aged 97); West Hollywood, California, U.S.
- Occupations: Novelist; screenwriter; director
- Spouse(s): Cleo Baldon (m. c. 1963; died 2014)
- Relatives: Lauritz Melchior (father)
- Writing career
- Period: 1959–2015
- Subject: Science fiction

Ib Jørgen Melchior (September 17, 1917 – March 14, 2015) was a Danish-American novelist, short-story writer, screenwriter and film director of low-budget American science fiction movies, most of them released by American International Pictures.

== Personal life ==
Melchior was born and raised in Copenhagen, Denmark, the son of Lauritz Melchior, an opera singer. He served in the Counterintelligence Corps (U.S. Army) during World War II, getting his training at Camp Ritchie in Maryland which classifies him as one of the Ritchie Boys. He also participated in the liberation of Flossenbürg concentration camp as well as the discovery of stolen currency, gold and art at Merkers-Kieselbach Cavern, and the capture of a Werwolf unit in 1945, for which he was awarded the Bronze Star. He was also involved in a long legal battle involving his father's estate, Chossewitz in Brandenburg, Germany, which was confiscated by the communist government of East Germany and never returned.

In 1965, a decorated war hero, he was dubbed Knight Commander of the Militant Order of Saint Bridget of Sweden.

In 1976, the Academy of Science Fiction, Fantasy and Horror Films awarded Ib Melchior its Golden Scroll Award of Merit for Outstanding Achievement.

Biographies include Ib Melchior: Man of Imagination by Robert Skotak, as well as Melchior's own autobiography Case by Case: A U.S. Army Counterintelligence Agent in World War II.

Melchior died of natural causes on March 14, 2015, at the age of 97, five months after the death of his wife of over 50 years, architect Cleo Baldon.

== Fiction and non-fiction ==
Melchior's novels include Code Name: Grand Guignol, Eva, The Haigerloch Project, The Marcus Device, Order of Battle: Hitler's Werewolves, Sleeper Agent, The Tombstone Cipher and The Watchdogs of Abaddon.

His non-fiction includes the books Quest: Searching for Germany's Nazi Past (with co-author Frank Brandenburg) and Lauritz Melchior: The Golden Years of Bayreuth, the latter a biography of his father, the opera singer and movie star Lauritz Melchior. In 1993 Melchior published an account of his career as a staff sergeant with the US Counterintelligence Corps (U.S. Army) during World War II, Case by Case: A U.S. Army Counterintelligence Agent in World War II. With his wife, Cleo Baldon, Melchior wrote the non-fiction books Reflections on the Pool: California Designs for Swimming and Steps & Stairways, both influenced by Baldon's work as an architect.

Melchior also wrote Hour of Vengeance, a play based on the Viking story of Amled that also inspired William Shakespeare's play Hamlet. In 1982, it was awarded the Hamlet Award for best playwriting by the Shakespeare Society of America.

== Films and television ==
As a filmmaker, Melchior wrote and directed The Angry Red Planet (1959) and The Time Travelers (1964). His most high-profile credit was as co-screenwriter (along with John C. Higgins) of Byron Haskin's critically acclaimed Robinson Crusoe on Mars (1964). He cowrote the screenplays for two U.S.–Danish coproductions, Reptilicus (1961) and Journey to the Seventh Planet (1962), and provided the English language script for Mario Bava's Planet of the Vampires (1965).

For television, he wrote the episode "The Premonition" for the second season of the original The Outer Limits series. The episode was broadcast in 1965.

Melchior's 1956 short story "The Racer" was adapted as Paul Bartel's cult film favorite, Death Race 2000 (1975), starring David Carradine and Sylvester Stallone and produced by Roger Corman. It was later remade as Death Race (2008), starring Jason Statham and Joan Allen, directed by Paul W. S. Anderson and produced by Tom Cruise.

He wrote the screenplay for the Pacific War action film Ambush Bay (1966) as well as writing and directing an anti-marijuana short subject Keep Off the Grass (1970).

He claimed to have originated the ideas for both Lost in Space and Star Trek, which were subsequently appropriated, without credit or compensation, by Irwin Allen and Gene Roddenberry, respectively. In 1962, three years before Lost in Space first aired, Melchior's comic, Space Family Robinson, debuted for Gold Key Comics, running for 59 issues until 1982. Both creations were loosely based on Johann David Wyss's 1812 novel The Swiss Family Robinson. The similarities between Allen's and Melchior's works moved Gold Key to mull legal action against the former. Gold Key was also publishing Allen's Voyage to the Bottom of the Sea, however, and therefore decided against filing suit. Instead, an agreement was reached whereby Melchior's comic could change its cover title to Space Family Robinson: Lost in Space. The new title appeared starting with issue #15, published in January 1966.

Prelude Pictures subsequently hired Melchior as a consultant on its 1998 Lost in Space feature film adaptation, but later sold his contract to New Line Cinema, its production partner on the film. New Line agreed to pay Melchior a $75,000 production bonus and $15,000, but refused him his contractually promised two percent of the producer's gross receipts from the film.

== Sources ==
=== Interviews ===
- Lawrence Fultz Jr., "The Man from Angry Red Planet: Ib Melchior", Monster Bash Magazine, 2007, No. 6
- Brett Homenick, "THE IMAGINATION OF IB MELCHIOR! A Conversation with the Danish Monster Moviemaker!" Vantage Point Interviews, July 2012. https://vantagepointinterviews.com/2017/05/18/the-imagination-of-ib-melchior-a-conversation-with-the-danish-monster-movie-maker/

=== Articles ===
- David C. Hayes, "Return to the Angry Red Planet", Planet X Magazine, October 2000, Vol. 1, No. 4
