= Journey to the Center of Time =

1967 film by David L. Hewitt

- DVD cover
- Directed by: David L. Hewitt
- Screenplay by: David L. Hewitt
- Produced by: David L. Hewitt; Ray Dorn
- Starring: Scott Brady; Anthony Eisley; Gigi Perreau; Abraham Sofaer
- Distributed by: Borealis Enterprises
- Release date: 1967
- Running time: 82 minutes
- Country: United States
- Language: English

Journey to the Center of Time is a 1967 U.S. science fiction film, directed by David L. Hewitt, and starring Scott Brady, Anthony Eisley, Gigi Perreau and Abraham Sofaer. It is a loose remake of The Time Travelers (1964) and is also known as Time Warp.

== Plot ==
Stanton has taken charge of a research company following the death of his father. He warns scientists Mark Mannin, "Doc" Gordon, and Karen White that unless they prove that their time travel experiments can produce some results, their funding will be cut off.

In desperation, they push their equipment past the level of safety, and they and Stanton travel 5000 years into the future. There, they encounter aliens led by Vina who are looking for a planet to colonize. The aliens find no welcome on Earth, which is in the midst of a global war that threatens the human race. She urges them to go back and warn humanity about the danger, then dies in a human attack. The time travelers retreat to their chamber and head back. On the way, they detect another time machine on a collision course. Manning tries to communicate with them; when that fails, they fire at it, but their weapon is too weak. Stanton takes charge, boosts the power and destroys the other vessel.

They overshoot the present and end up in the distant past, in the age of dinosaurs. Their giant ruby, a key component of the machine, is destroyed, leaving them stranded. When they explore a nearby cave, they find it studded with all sorts of jewels, including rubies. Overcome by greed, Stanton grabs handfuls of precious gems, returns to the time machine, replaces the ruby and takes off without the scientists. However, on his return trip, he encounters another time travelling machine on a collision course. As he hears a radio broadcast from Manning, Stanton realizes with horror that he is racing towards the earlier version of the time machine. Then he is killed by the blast initiated by his earlier self.

Meanwhile, as the scientists leave the cave, Gordon stumbles and falls to his death in molten lava. Mark and Karen find the time machine gone; then it mysteriously reappears. They board it and try to return to their present, but arrive the day before their initial departure; as a result, they see their past selves living at a much slower time rate. They hasten back to the time machine to try to fix the problem, but end up hopelessly lost in time and space. In the final scene, the machine, with the two scientists on board, is shown drifting among the stars towards an unknown fate.

== Cast ==
- Scott Brady as Stanton
- Anthony Eisley as Mark Manning
- Gigi Perreau as Karen White
- Abraham Sofaer as Dr. "Doc" Gordon
- Austin Green as Mr. Denning
- Poupée Gamin as Vina (as Poupee Gamin)
- Tracy Olsen as Susan
- Andy Davis as Dave
- Lyle Waggoner as Alien (as Lyle Waggner)
- Larry Evans
- Jody Millhouse
- Monica Stevens
