= Dr. Terror's Gallery of Horrors =

- Directed by: David L. Hewitt
- Written by: Gary R. Heacock; Russ Jones; David Prentiss
- Produced by: David L. Hewitt
- Starring: Joey Benson; John Carradine; Lon Chaney Jr.
- Cinematography: Austin McKinney
- Edited by: Tim Hinkle
- Release date: 1967
- Country: United States
- Language: English

Dr. Terror's Gallery of Horrors is a low-budget 1967 colour scope horror anthology film by David L. Hewitt from stories by Russ Jones. The film includes footage from Roger Corman's Edgar Allan Poe adaptations.

The similarity of its title to Amicus Productions' hit Dr. Terror's House of Horrors led to numerous enforced title changes, including Return from the Past, The Blood Suckers, Alien Massacre, and most commonly Gallery of Horror (on-screen) and Gallery of Horrors (on packaging). It has also been released as The Witch's Clock, after the first story, and the only one to feature star John Carradine, who hosts the interstitial segments.

It also stars Lon Chaney Jr., Rochelle Hudson, Roger Gentry and Vic McGee. The other stories include "King Vampire," "Monster Raid," "Spark of Life," and "Count Alucard," which is credited as "Count Dracula." In the latter story, Jonathan Harker (one of several roles played by Gentry) is revealed, in a humorous twist, to be a werewolf.

Proclaimed by the film's posters as being the 'world's weirdest movie'.

== Cast ==
- Lon Chaney Jr. as Dr. Mendell (as Lon Chaney)
- John Carradine as Narrator / Tristram Halbin
- Rochelle Hudson as Helen Spalding
- Roger Gentry as Bob Farrell / Mob Leader / Dr. Sevard / Jonathan Harker
- Ron Doyle as Brenner / Dr. Charles Spalding / Dr. Cushing
- Karen Joy as Julie Farrell / Vampire (Medina)
- Vic McGee as Dr. Finchley / Desmond / Amos Duncan / The Burgermeister
- Ron Brogan as Marsh
- Margaret Moore as Mrs. O'Shea
- Gray Daniels as The Coachman
- Mitch Evans as The Count (Alucard)
- Joey Benson as Dr. Sedgewick
