= The Time Travelers (1964 film) =

1964 film by Ib Melchior

- Theatrical release poster by Reynold Brown
- Directed by: Ib Melchior
- Screenplay by: Ib Melchior
- Story by: Ib Melchior; David L. Hewitt
- Produced by: Bill Redlin
- Starring: Preston Foster; Philip Carey; Merry Anders; John Hoyt
- Cinematography: Vilmos Zsigmond
- Edited by: Hal Dennis
- Music by: Richard LaSalle
- Production company: Dobil Productions
- Distributed by: American International Pictures
- Release date: October 29, 1964
- Running time: 82 minutes
- Country: United States
- Language: English
- Budget: $250,000 (estimated)

The Time Travelers is a 1964 American science fiction film directed by Ib Melchior and starring Preston Foster, Philip Carey, Merry Anders, Steve Franken, and John Hoyt. The plot involves a group of scientists who find that, due to an electrical overload, their time-viewing screen suddenly allows them to travel through time.

The film was released by American International Pictures on October 29, 1964, on a double feature with Atragon.

== Plot ==
Scientists Dr. Erik von Steiner, Dr. Steve Connors, and Carol White are testing their time-viewing device which is drawing enormous amounts of power. Danny McKee, a technician from the power plant, has been sent to tell them to shut down their experiment. During the test, odd shadows cross the room and the screen shows a stark, barren landscape. Danny discovers the screen has become a "time portal" and steps through.

The portal becomes unstable, and the others enter it to call him back. The portal disappears, stranding them. Pursued by hostile mutants, they seek refuge in a cave which they discover leads to an underground city – all that is left of civilization in a future devastated by nuclear war.

They are informed that the year is A.D. 2071. City leader Dr. Varno explains that the devastated Earth is now unable to support life, and that the residents, along with their androids, are frantically working on a spacecraft which will take them to a planet orbiting Alpha Centauri. Exploration, including by a probe that looks like the Mars rover, has shown that no planets in the Solar System are habitable by humans. While the future people have a Transporter, it is of no use to reach distant planets.

The mutants, once peaceful, have become increasingly hostile as Earth's resources dwindle, and now intend to acquire the city's food supply by force. The four time travelers, told they may not join the space voyage (due to weight, space, resource, and time restrictions), are allowed to work on recreating their time portal to return to their own era. Dr. Varno and others help von Steiner, Connors, White, and McKee race to rebuild the device, while the rest of the community readies the spacecraft for liftoff. However, the mutants invade the complex and attack just as the spaceship enters the final boarding stages before its departure. The spacecraft is subsequently destroyed while trying to take off. At this moment, the time portal shows the time travelers' point of origin and the remaining humans realize their only chance for survival is to enter it. Along with a few people from the future, the travelers escape back to their own time. They throw objects back through the portal to damage the equipment on the other side and shut down the portal so the mutants cannot follow them.

The survivors return to the lab where their past selves are still present but immobile. The travelers realize that, due to mistakes in their calibration of the portal, they are experiencing time at an accelerated rate, and will therefore die of old age by the end of the day. Their only option is to travel to the date the portal had briefly been set to before it was switched to A.D. 2071. That previous date is over 100,000 years in the future, but the screen is dark; what lies ahead is unknown. They cross the room, casting the shadows seen before the portal appeared.

When they enter the portal, the screen flashes on and shows the travelers walking in a sunlit clearing with trees, grass, a lake, and animals; the surface of the Earth is habitable again. Their past selves are then shown moving at normal speed again, repeating their actions at an ever accelerating rate; the events of the entire movie rapidly cycle, repeating with increasingly briefer and fewer clips, until the film ends with a shot of the Andromeda Galaxy.

== Cast ==
- Preston Foster as Dr. Erik von Steiner
- Philip Carey as Dr. Steve Connors
- Merry Anders as Carol White
- John Hoyt as Dr. Varno
- Dennis Patrick as Councilman Willard
- Joan Woodbury as Gadra
- Delores Wells as Reena
- Steve Franken as Danny McKee, the electrician
- Forrest J. Ackerman as the square-frame technician
- Berry Kroeger as Preston
- Gloria Leslie as Councilwoman
- Mollie Glessing as Android
- Peter Strudwick as The Mutant
- J. Edward McKinley as Raymond
- Margaret Seldeen as Miss Hollister

== Production ==
Production began in 1963 under the working title Time Trap. Shooting took place in Los Angeles (including at the University of Southern California campus) and Pisgah Crater.

Director Melchior was unable to secure an adequate budget to fully exploit the potential of the story line. In some scenes conjuring tricks are used to compensate for the lack of visual effects; for instance, in one uncut shot, a mask-wearing actor playing an android appears to have his head removed and replaced by another, before walking away.

At 44 minutes into the film Forrest J Ackerman appears briefly in a scene depicting several technicians working. Ackerman's only line is "Don't worry. I'm keeping our spacemen happy. Getting things squared away." The joke is a self-referential sight gag; his character is working on a device that turns a circular frame into a square frame. At the time, Ackerman was editing a science-fiction magazine titled Spacemen. The Time Travelers was heavily promoted in his magazine on the basis of Ackerman's cameo appearance.

The film was one of several low-budget B movies that future Oscar-winning cinematographer Vilmos Zsigmond (billed as 'William Zsigmond') shot during the 1960s. Zsigmond's close friend László Kovács was his camera operator on the film.

Animator Oskar Fischinger contributed to the film's visual effects.

== Reception ==
The Time Travelers was a B film, evident by its meagre production values, although both the plot and actors were singled out for mention by critics. Leonard Maltin considered the film "not bad with a downbeat ending, one of the first American films photographed by Vilmos Zsigmond". (Note: In 2003, a survey conducted by the International Cinematographers Guild placed Vilmos Zsigmond among the 10 most influential cinematographers in history.) It was lampooned decades later in the Netflix revival of Mystery Science Theater 3000.

In an early 2010s retrospective review Graeme Clark of The Spinning Image wrote, "In spite of the low budget, this still looks pretty good thanks to intelligent use of the resources available. The portal the scientists create, as Danny discovers, is more than a mere window on the coming years, because they can actually walk through it and pass through the decades to exist in the future."

== Influence ==
The film was an inspiration for the 1966 TV series The Time Tunnel.

The film's screenwriter David L. Hewitt directed a loose remake of the film, Journey to the Center of Time, three years later.

== See also ==
- List of American films of 1964
- List of apocalyptic films
- List of films featuring time loops
