= David L. Hewitt =

American film producer

- Born: August 12, 1939 (age 86); San Francisco, California
- Occupation: film director
- Years active: 1965–2003

David L. Hewitt (born August 12, 1939) is an American film director and producer. Among the films he has directed are The Wizard of Mars, Monsters Crash the Pajama Party (both 1965), Journey to the Center of Time (1967), The Mighty Gorga (1969) and The Girls from Thunder Strip (1970).

== Background ==
As a teenager he was an illusionist in the Dr. Jeckyll's Strange Show, a travelling spook show. Later, with an interest in getting into the movie business, he contacted Forrest J. Ackerman and offered him a film script. The original script was called Journey into the Unknown. The script was rewritten by Ib Melchior and given a new title of The Time Travellers. His directing debut was Monsters Crash the Pajama Party.

== Film work ==
In addition to The Time Travellers, which he also provided special effects for, and his directional debut, The Monsters Crash the Pajama Party, he would direct a number of films.

In 1967, he wrote, directed, and co-produced the horror anthology Dr. Terror's Gallery of Horrors, which featured John Carradine. This is also known as The Blood Suckers, Gallery of Horrors, Gallery of Horror, Return from the Past, and even The Witch's Clock, which is the title of the first segment. The film, which was basically a capitalization on Dr. Terror's House of Horrors, had in later years achieved a degree of cult status. In 1968, he directed Hell's Chosen Few, a biker movie starring Jody Daniel and Kelly Ross. He also directed The Mighty Gorga and The Girls from Thunder Strip, both of which featured Megan Timothy. In The Mighty Gorga, he also played Gorga. He directed the Nazisploitation film The Tormentors which was released in 1971.

Two of Hewitt's films were retitled Alien Massacre. The retitling appears to have been the unauthorized work of Regal Video, Inc. of New York, New York. The cover, released on both films, proclaims "Blood flows like water...", and shows a woman in helmet and epaulets (and apparently nothing else) standing in a barren landscape with her arm, bleeding profusely, modestly covering her chest. These films are The Wizard of Mars (1965), retitled Horrors of the Red Planet in 1988, an uncredited science fiction takeoff of L. Frank Baum's The Wonderful Wizard of Oz (which became public domain in 1957) in which astronaut Dorothy (Eve Bernhart) and three male astronauts follow a golden road to an ancient alien city, and the aforementioned Dr. Terror's Gallery of Horrors (1966), which, in spite of the new title, does not feature any aliens. The package description described neither film, but rather described an attack on a scientist and his daughter aboard their space vessel. Neither film depicts a parent-child relationship.

== Later years ==
In later years, he was a visual effects producer for The Quiet American, Rabbit-Proof Fence and Inspector Gadget 2.

== Filmography ==
As director

- The Wizard of Mars (1965), director/producer/writer
- Monsters Crash the Pajama Party (1965 short), director/producer/writer
- Journey to the Center of Time (1967), director/producer/writer
- Dr. Terror's Gallery of Horrors (1967, also known as Gallery of Horror), director/producer/writer
- Hells Chosen Few (1968), director/producer/writer
- The Mighty Gorga (1969), director/producer/writer
- The Girls from Thunder Strip (1970), director/producer/writer
- Pornography USA (1971, documentary)
- The Tormentors (1971, as B. Eagle), director/producer
- The Lucifer Complex (1978), director/writer
