= Alex Sharp (American actor) =

American actor, stuntman and writer (1921–2008)

- Born: September 16, 1921; Nebraska, U.S.
- Died: March 6, 2008 (aged 86)
- Other name: Alex Sharpe
- Occupations: Actor, stuntman, writer
- Years active: 1948–1993
- Organization: Stuntmen's Association of Motion Pictures
- Height: 6 ft 4.5 in (194.3 cm)

Alex Sharp, also known and credited as Alex Sharpe (September 16, 1921 – March 6, 2008) was an American actor, stuntman, and writer, perhaps best known for his work in television western shows such as Bonanza and Gunsmoke.

== Early years ==
Sharp was born in Nebraska and was raised in Washington and Colorado, where he learned to break horses. He spent time with the U.S. Cavalry at Fort Riley, and became a bomber gunner in the South Pacific during World War II.

== Career ==
One of his earliest jobs in 1950 was doubling for Scott Forbes on the film Rocky Mountain. He would again double for Forbes in The Adventures of Jim Bowie (1956-1958)

Stunts in fight scenes were his specialty, and Sharp did at least a half-dozen with Michael Landon on Bonanza, with Sharp doubling for guest stars George Kennedy and Leif Erickson.

At around 6'4" and 200 pounds, Sharp was a large enough actor to double for James Arness (6'7") on Gunsmoke for its 20-year run from 1955 to 1975. Sharp also doubled for Richard Coogan on The Californians (1957-1959).

As a stuntman, Sharp was a member of the Stuntmen's Association of Motion Pictures, and an inductee into the Stunmen's Hall of Fame.

As a writer, Sharp co-wrote (with Ed Erwin) the screenplay for the 1965 film Vengeance. Sharp also wrote and contributed teleplays for shows, including Bonanza and The High Chaparral.

== Personal life ==
In 1963, Sharp and fellow stuntman Bill Hickman witnessed a bank robber, Carl Follette, speed by them on the Ventura Freeway near the Laurel Canyon off-ramp. After Hickman saw the suspect shoot police Officer Alphonso Begue in the chest, he used his stunt driver skills to chase him down on Laurel Canyon Road until law enforcement officers could catch up. The car chase eventually ended in a North Hollywood parking lot where Follette was shot and killed in an exchange of gunfire with the police.

== Death ==
Sharp died at the age of 86 from stroke-related ailments.

== Filmography ==
A partial filmography follows

=== Film ===
Film credits for acting and stunts include:

- Harpoon (1948) as Whaler #2
- Easy Living (1949) as Don
- Rocky Mountain (1950)
- Horizons West (1952)
- Yankee Buccaneer (1952)
- Seminole (1953)
- Wichita (1955)
- Showdown at Abilene (1956)
- Red Sundown (1956)
- The Night Runner (1957) as Deputy
- The Horse Soldiers (1959)
- Spartacus (1960)
- How the West Was Won (1962)
- Young Guns of Texas (1962) as Red
- It's a Mad, Mad, Mad, Mad World (1963)
- Law of the Lawless (1964) as Rider
- The Great Race (1965)
- El Dorado (1967) stunts (uncredited)
- Planet of the Apes (1968)
- Bullitt (1968)
- The Wild Bunch (1969)
- The Great Bank Robbery (1969)
- Catch-22 (1970)
- Flap (1970)
- Dirty Harry (1971)
- Diamonds Are Forever (1971)
- What's Up, Doc? (1972) stunts
- Conquest of the Planet of the Apes (1972)
- Battle for the Planet of the Apes (193)
- Mr. Majestyk (1974)
- Hearts of the West (1975)
- Bound for Glory (1976)
- Harry and Walter Go to New York (1976)
- Zero to Sixty (1978)
- The Champ (1979)
- Sunburn (1979) as Kunz
- Pee-Wee's Big Adventure (1985) as Cowboy #2
- In the Line of Fire (1993)

=== Television ===
Television credits for acting and stunts include:

- The Adventures of Jim Bowie
- Batman
- Ben Casey
- Bonanza (1961-1972) stunts (13 episodes, uncredited)
  - "Elizabeth, My Love" (1961, S2E33) as Blackmer
  - "The Many Faces of Gideon Flinch" (1961, S3E7) as Cowboy (uncredited)
  - "The Last Vote" (1968, S10E6) as Townsman (uncredited)
  - "El Jefe" (1970, S12E10) as Truitt
  - "The Lonely Man" (1972, S13E16) as Brawler (uncredited)
- Branded
- The Californians (1957-1959)
- Cheyenne
- The Cisco Kid
- Death Valley Days (1956-1957)
  - "California's Paul Revere" (1957) as John Brown
  - "Pat Garrett's Side of It" (1956) as Sheriff Pat Garrett
- The Dakotas (1963) as Guard (uncredited)
- Have Gun – Will Travel
- The High Chaparral
- The Life and Legend of Wyatt Earp (1957-1959) 4 episodes (uncredited)
- Little House on the Prairie
- Little House: The Last Farewell (1984)
- The Lone Ranger
- Mission: Impossible
- The Rockford Files
- Tales of Wells Fargo (1959) as Sam Benson
- The Virginian
- Gunsmoke (1955-1975) stunts and doubling James Arness
  - "The Man Who Would Be Marshal" (1957, S2E37) as Jeff Willoughby
  - "Potshot" (1961, S6E25) as Bud
  - "Stolen Horses" (1961, S6E29) as Acker
  - "Perce" (1961, S7E1) as Nickols
  - "Apprentice Doc" (1961, S7E11) as Clerk (uncredited)
  - "The Dreamers" (1962, S7E30) as Drunken Cowboy (uncredited)
  - "Abe Blocker" (1962, S8E11) as Posse Member (uncredited)
  - "The Cousin" (1963, S8E21) as Saloon Brawler (uncredited)
  - "I Call Him Wonder" (1963, S8E28) as Cook
  - "Old York" (1963, S8E34) as Gang Member (uncredited)
  - "Snap Decision" (1966, S12E1) as Cowboy (uncredited)
  - "The Goldtakers" (1966, S12E2) as Trooper (uncredited)
  - "Saturday Night" (1967, S12E16) as Cowboy (uncredited)
  - "Cattle Barons" (1967, S13E2) as Drover (uncredited)
  - "Major Glory" (1967, S13E8) as Brawler (uncredited)
  - "Dead Man's Law" (1968, S13E17) as Rustler
  - "Shadler" (1973, S18E17) as Reno
  - "Jesse" (1973, S18E22) as Cowhand (uncredited)
  - "The Child Between" (1973, S19E14) as third Hidecutter
  - "The Fourth Victim" (1974, S20E8) as third Matt
- Captains and the Kings (1976)
- The Magnificent Magical Magnet of Santa Mesa (1977) as Alex

=== Writer ===
Teleplay credits include:

- Bonanza (1963-1968)
  - "The Hayburner" (1963, S4E21)
  - "Ponderosa Matador" (1964, S5E15)
  - "The Saga of Muley Jones" (1964, S5E26) Story co-written with Robert V. Barron
  - "Old Sheba" (1964, S6E10)
  - "Hound Dog" (1965, S6E25)
  - "Ponderosa Explosion" (1967, S8E16)
  - "Stage Door Johnnies" (1968, S9E34)
- The High Chaparral (1968-1969)
  - "The Covey" (1968, S2E5)
  - "A Fella Named Kilroy" (1969, S2E23)
- The Cowboys (1974) "The Remounts" (S1E9)

Screenplay credits include:

- Vengeance (1965) co-written with Ed Erwin
