= Guestward, Ho! =

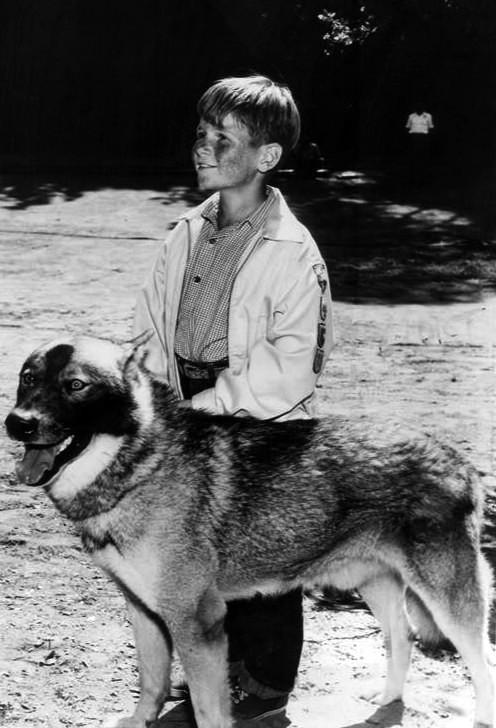
- Flip Mark as Brook Hooten with Tonka (1961)
- Genre: Comedy
- Developed by: Cy Howard
- Written by: Bob Schiller; Bob Weiskopf; Ronald Alexander; Arthur Julian, based on Guestward Ho! (1956) by Patrick Dennis and Barbara Hooton
- Directed by: Claudio Guzmán, Desi Arnaz
- Starring: Joanne Dru; Mark Miller; J. Carrol Naish; Flip Mark
- Theme music composer: Arthur Hamilton
- Ending theme: "Guestward Ho!"
- Composer: Earle Hagen
- Country of origin: United States
- Original language: English
- No. of seasons: 1
- No. of episodes: 38

Production
- Executive producer: Cy Howard
- Producers: David Heilweil; Elliott Lewis
- Running time: 30 minutes
- Production company: Desilu Productions

Original release
- Network: ABC
- Release: September 29, 1960 – June 22, 1961

Guestward, Ho! is an American sitcom that aired on the ABC network from September 29, 1960, through September 21, 1961. It was based on the book of the same title by New Mexico dude ranch operator Barbara Hooton and Patrick Dennis.

== Overview ==
The premise revolves around a New York City family, the Hootens, who tire of the urban lifestyle and relocate to operate a dude ranch in New Mexico. Having bought the place unseen, they find it needs considerably more work than they were led to believe. The Hootens befriend the Native American "Hawkeye" whose "trading post" was the only source of supplies in the vicinity. Hawkeye, played by J. Carrol Naish, was a rather cynical native who sold indigenous-looking trinkets mass-produced in Asia, and who frequently read The Wall Street Journal, seemingly in search of a way to purchase the country and return it to its "rightful owners". Jeanette Nolan guest starred as Mrs. Winslow in the 1961 episode "Hawkeye's First Love".

Earle Hodgins appeared in at least three episodes as the 67-year-old ranch wrangler named "Lonesome". In the episode "Lonesome's Gal", ZaSu Pitts, formerly of The Gale Storm Show, played his romantic interest. Jody McCrea, whose Wichita Town, an NBC western series in which he starred with his father, Joel McCrea, ended in 1960, was cast as an Indian, "Danny Brave Eagle", in the 1961 episode entitled "The Wrestler".

The second episode was entitled "You Can't Go Home Again", borrowing from Thomas Wolfe's novel, You Can't Go Home Again. The series finale was "No Place Like Home".

== Cast ==
Characters in Guestward Ho! and Actors Who Portrayed Them
Character	Actor
Babs Hooten	Joanne Dru
Hawkeye	J. Carrol Naish
Bill Hooten	Mark Miller
Brook Hooten	Flip Mark
Lonesome	Earle Hodgins
Pink Cloud	Jolene Brand
Rocky	Tony Montenaro Jr.

== Background ==
The trade publication Billboard reported in December 1957 that CBS was negotiating with Jeanne Crain to be the lead in an adaptation of Guestward, Ho! A February 1958 Billboard article still had Crain set for the lead in the program being developed for the 1958–1959 season.

Guestward, Ho! initially began at CBS in 1958, with Vivian Vance and Leif Erickson as the Hootens, an older childless couple. Desilu had developed the pilot specifically for Vance, who had portrayed Ethel Mertz on the hit CBS/Desilu sitcom I Love Lucy from 1951 to 1957, and its later followup specials. Vance had rejected doing an I Love Lucy spin-off focusing on Ethel and Fred Mertz, in favor of doing the Guestward, Ho! pilot. Upon viewing the pilot, CBS executives felt that Vance had become so typecast in her Ethel Mertz role that she was unconvincing playing a leading character in her own situation comedy. One executive allegedly said "I kept waiting for Lucy to come in" after viewing the pilot. Hence, CBS rejected the series.

Desilu eventually retooled the pilot, with Joanne Dru and Mark Miller as the Hootens, now a younger couple (with Babs being a former model). Flip Mark was cast as their son, Brook Hooten, a character created in the retooling. ABC bought this pilot, and slated it for its Thursday evening schedule as a lead-in to The Donna Reed Show. Ralston-Purina served as the primary sponsor, with 7 Up as an alternate sponsor.

== Guest stars ==
- William Bakewell
- Madge Blake
- Frank Cady
- Richard Deacon
- Kathleen Freeman
- Ned Glass
- Michael Hinn
- Charles Lane
- Carole Mathews
- Louis Nye
- Stafford Repp
- Natalie Schafer
- Willard Waterman
- Adam Williams
- William Windom
- Adam West

== Episodes ==
No.	Title	Original release date
1	"The Hootens Buy a Ranch"	September 29, 1960
2	"You Can't Go Home Again"	October 6, 1960
3	"The Lost Tribe"	October 20, 1960
4	"Babs Meets Phyllis Brady"	October 27, 1960
5	"Babs and the Cow"	November 3, 1960
6	"The Hootens Fire Lonesome"	November 10, 1960
7	"Babs' Mother"	November 17, 1960
8	"The Thanksgiving Story"	November 24, 1960
9	"Babs' Vanity"	December 1, 1960
10	"Babs and the Lion"	December 8, 1960
11	"The Matchmaker"	December 15, 1960
12	"The Christmas Spirit"	December 22, 1960
13	"The Model Mother"	December 29, 1960
14	"Injun Bill"	January 5, 1961
15	"The Social Director"	January 12, 1961
16	"Frontier Week"	January 19, 1961
17	"Too Many Cooks"	January 26, 1961
18	"Dimples Goes Hollywood"	February 2, 1961
19	"No Vacancy"	February 9, 1961
20	"Manhattan Merry-Go-Round"	February 16, 1961
21	"Bill, the Candidate"	February 23, 1961
22	"Babs, the Guest"	March 2, 1961
23	"Hawkeye's First Love"	March 9, 1961
24	"Hawkeye, the Mother"	March 16, 1961
25	"Hawkeye's Stadium"	March 23, 1961
26	"The Honorary Indian"	March 30, 1961
27	"The Hootens Build a Barbecue"	April 6, 1961
28	"Hooten's Statue"	April 13, 1961
29	"Two Guests From the Past"	April 20, 1961
30	"Bill, the Fireman"	April 27, 1961
31	"Babs, the Manager"	May 4, 1961
32	"Lonesome's Gal"	May 11, 1961
33	"The Wrestler"	May 18, 1961
34	"The Hootens Versus Hawkeye"	May 25, 1961
35	"The Hooten's Second Car"	June 1, 1961
36	"The Wild West Show"	June 8, 1961
37	"The Beatniks"	June 15, 1961
38	"No Place Like Home"	June 22, 1961

== Production ==
Guestward, Ho! was broadcast on Thursdays from 7:30 to 8 p.m. Eastern Time. Ralston Purina and 7 Up were the sponsors. David Heilweil was the producer.

It ran opposite Outlaws on NBC. On CBS it initially ran against the first half-hour of The Witness, and then later in the season against fellow Desilu program The Ann Sothern Show. ABC ultimately canceled the series following one season, replacing it with The Adventures of Ozzie and Harriet in its timeslot.

== Critical response ==
A review of the premiere episode in The New York Times called it "an example of Hollywood formula film TV at its best and brightest." The review said that Dru, Miller, and Mark portrayed their characters "airily", and it concluded with "By dint of its high polish it achieved an entertainment level well above that reached by most of its rivals."

== Bibliography ==
- Tim Brooks and Earle Marsh, The Complete Directory to Prime Time Network and Cable TV Shows 1946–Present, Ninth edition (New York: Ballantine Books, 2007) ISBN 978-0-345-49773-4
