= Ben Matheson =

Ben Matheson may refer to:

- Ben Matheson, character in Revolution (TV series)
- Ben Matheson, character in Wichita Town
