= Julie Darling =

Julie Darling may refer to:

- Julie Darling (film), a 1982 Canadian-West German film
- Julie Darling (politician), member of the Montana House of Representatives

== See also ==
- Julia Darling, English novelist, poet and dramatist
