= Operation Bikini =

1963 film

- Film poster
- Directed by: Anthony Carras
- Written by: John Tomerlin
- Produced by: Lou Rusoff; James H. Nicholson executive Samuel Z. Arkoff
- Starring: Tab Hunter; Frankie Avalon; Scott Brady; Jim Backus; Gary Crosby
- Cinematography: Gil Warrenton
- Edited by: Anthony Carras; Homer Powell
- Music by: Les Baxter
- Production company: Alta Vista
- Distributed by: American International Pictures
- Release date: March 26, 1963
- Running time: 81 minutes
- Country: United States
- Language: English

Operation Bikini, also titled The Seafighter, is a war film released in 1963 by American International Pictures. It was directed by Anthony Carras and starred Tab Hunter, Frankie Avalon and Scott Brady.

The casting was aimed to capture a varied audience. While Operation Bikini was nominally a World War II war movie, it shared a number of cast members—Avalon, Jody McCrea and Eva Six—with American International's Beach Party (soon to become a franchise), and thrown into the mix were character actor Jim Backus, former screen heartthrob Tab Hunter and Gary Crosby (son of Bing). Avalon sings in two musical interludes, which were shot in color despite the fact that, aside from the closing credits, the rest of the film is black and white.

== Plot ==
The commander of an American submarine in the Pacific during World War II, is ordered to stop to pick up an underwater demolition team led by Lt. Hayes. Hayes' mission is to locate and destroy an American submarine sunk in a lagoon off Bikini Atoll before the Japanese are able to raise it and capture the advanced radar system on board.

The members of the demolition team include Seaman Joseph Malzone, Will Sherman and Ronald Davayo, the only member of the team who speaks Japanese. Malzone carries a photo of his girl, which he affixes to the torpedo above his bunk. In two musical dream sequences, Malzone expresses his devotion to "The Girl Back Home."

Upon arriving at the atoll, the demolition team meets up with a local band of guerrillas, including native interpreter Paul and the buxom Reiko. After Paul is killed by a Japanese patrol, a romance develops between Reiko and Hayes, or possibly Malzone. Before anything can come of it, a Japanese cutter comes up the river on patrol, and in the resulting skirmish, Reiko is killed. The gruff but good-hearted bosun's mate is wounded in the same fight, and Sherman has to take him back to Carey's sub, where he reports the team's discovery that the lagoon where the radar sub had sunk is full of Japanese vessels. Carey relays this news to the nearest American aircraft carrier.

Meanwhile, the rest of the team uses the captured Japanese cutter to sail straight into the lagoon. Malzone and Hayes dive to the sunken sub, but when the crew of a Japanese salvage boat opens fire on the cutter, Davayo rams the boat in a suicide attack. After setting their explosive charges, Malzone and Hayes are guided back to Carey's sub by Sherman (possessor of the "finest pair of lungs in the Navy"), just as a fleet of American dive bombers arrive to finish off the Japanese vessels in the lagoon.

== Cast ==
- Tab Hunter as Lieutenant Morgan Hayes
- Frankie Avalon as Seaman Joseph Malzone
- Scott Brady as Captain Emmett Carey
- Jim Backus as First Mate Ed Fennelly
- Gary Crosby as Seaman Floyd Givens
- Michael Dante as Lieutenant William Fourtney
- Jody McCrea as Seaman William Sherman
- Eva Six as Reiko
- Aki Aleong as Seaman Ronald Davayo
- David Landfield as Lieutenant Cale
- Richard Bakalyan as Seaman Hiller
- Joe Finnegan as Seaman Morris
- Vernon Scott as Seaman Fowler
- Raymond Guth as Seaman Rich
- Tony Scott as Chief Petty Officer Perez
- Steve Mitchell as Seaman Nolan
- Mickey McDermott as Seaman Fairly
- Wayne Winton as Seaman Patterson
- Duane Ament as Seaman Kingsley
- Jody Daniels as Seaman Jones
- Marc Cavell as Paul
- Raynum K. Tsukamoto as Kawai
- Lan Nam Tuttle as Mika
- Alicia Li as Native Girl #3
- Nancy Dusina as Dream Girl Back Home
- Judy Lewis as Dream Siren

== Production ==
American International Pictures announced the film, originally known as The Seafighters or The Sea Fighter, in March 1962. It marked the directorial debut of editor Anthony Carras.

Rory Calhoun was originally announced as the film's star, but the lead eventually went to Tab Hunter. It was Hunter's first Hollywood film since The Pleasure of His Company (1960).

Filming started in December 1962 and took place at Republic Studios.

In November 1962, the film was retitled Bikini.

== Reception ==
The Monthly Film Bulletin said, "... for the most part this is a conventional but competent production... the acting as a whole is never less than competent" but had issues with the final scenes which involved a nuclear blast "then a whole series of shots of a couple of girls playing on the seashore in bikinis."

The Los Angeles Times said that the film "... might be titled 'Operation Smorgasboard' since it's a combination of South Sea Island melodrama, war story and comedy."

Filmink wrote "it feels like a picture that began as a stock war story but then AIP panicked at some stage and ordered all this other stuff put in, like Frankie Avalon songs and scenes of Bikini Atoll. It's not very good."

== Comic book adaption ==
- Dell Movie Classic: Operation Bikini (October 1963)
