= Scream Free! =

- Directed by: Bill Brame; John Lawrence (uncredited)
- Screenplay by: James Gordon White; John Lawrence
- Produced by: John Lawrence; Maurice Smith; Ray Dornn; Lynn Steed
- Starring: Russ Tamblyn; Richard Beymer; Lana Wood
- Production company: Dorad Productions
- Distributed by: Hollywood Star Pictures
- Release date: 1969
- Running time: 90 minutes
- Country: United States
- Language: English

Scream Free! is a 1969 American film. It reunites two of the stars of the film West Side Story, Russ Tamblyn and Richard Beymer, who appear opposite Lana Wood, the sister of Natalie Wood, who was also in West Side Story.

The film was also known as Free Grass. The film was re-edited in 1989 for a video release with new scenes added and released under the title Street Drugs.

== Plot ==
A man flees with his girlfriend on his motorbike to Mexico.

== Cast ==
- Russ Tamblyn
- Lana Wood
- Richard Beymer
- Casey Kasem
- Jody McCrea
- Lindsay Crosby
- Elizabeth Thompson
- Sandy Mansson

== Production ==
The film was shot in March 1968 based on a script by John Lawrence, who produced it through a company formed with Maurice L. Smith.

James Gordon White, who worked with Lawrence on The Glory Stompers, also worked on the script. He recalled, "I didn't like working on the script. The guys that had the original story credit were given that for putting up the money."

Filming took place in Los Angeles, with scenes shot at Griffith Park under the title Free Grass.

== Reception ==
Shock Cinema Magazine said "Despite some tedious stretches, it's recommended for anyone into counterculture nostalgia, or members of the Russ Tamblyn Fan Club."

Video Beat said "Things to look for: Richard Avedon's psychedelic John Lennon posters covering an entre wall, lots of smoking joints, crash pads, psychedelic rock band, "The Boston Tea Party," strobe lights, an unbelievable amount of flashing trippy effects (there's even an end credit for "Psychedelic Lights and Visual Effects") and an absolutely goofy ending."

Psychotronic Video said "A lot of people would enjoy this lost feature (which isn't a biker movie, although, characters do ride cycles). It deserves to be released in it's [sic] original form."
