= Stunt coordinator =

Person in a film crew who arranges stunts

A stunt coordinator, usually an experienced stunt performer, is hired by a TV, film or theatre director or production company for casting stunt performers. Their job is to arrange the casting (stunt players and stunt doubles) and performance of stunts for a film, television programme or a live audience.

Where the film requires a stunt, and involves the use of stunt performers, the stunt coordinator will arrange the casting and performance of the stunt, working closely with the director.

In many cases, the stunt coordinator budgets, designs and choreographs the stunt sequence to suit the script and the director's vision.

It is a stunt coordinator's responsibility to create an environment where open dialogue among cast & crew involved in stunts can occur (i.e., concerns and problems can be resolved without fear of retaliation, bullying or belittlement). They should ensure that adequate rehearsals and planning occur prior to filming on set, and also ensure that performer credentials are vetted.

There are two Primetime Emmy Awards for Outstanding Stunt Coordination:

- Outstanding Stunt Coordination for a Drama Series, Limited Series, or Movie
- Outstanding Stunt Coordination for a Comedy Series or Variety Program

== See also ==
- Casting Director
- Stuntmen's Association of Motion Pictures
