= Oddballs (film) =

- Directed by: Miklós Lente
- Screenplay by: Ed Naha
- Produced by: Maurice Smith; Roger Corman; Peter McQuillan
- Cinematography: Fred Guthe
- Edited by: Marcus Manton
- Production company: Maurice Smith Productions
- Distributed by: Almi Pictures (U.S., 1984, theatrical); New Horizons Pictures (U.S., 1984, theatrical); Lightning Video (U.S., 1986, VHS); Vestron Video (U.S., 1986, VHS)
- Release date: 6 April 1984 (United States)
- Running time: 91 minutes
- Country: Canada
- Language: English

Oddballs is a 1984 Canadian sex comedy film directed by Miklós Lente. It was inspired by the success of Meatballs.

== Plot ==
Hardly Basset, a grouch who took over "Camp Bottomout" after winning it in a poker game, enlists his daughter Jennifer's help to run it properly. The boys and girls are kept in separate camps upon arrival, much to the boy's dismay, but that doesn't stop the boys from heading across the river to spy on the girls, only to discover that J. Frothingham Skinner—the owner of the girls' camp—plans to buy the boys' camp and turn it into a shopping mall.

== Cast ==
- Foster Brooks as Hardy Bassett
- Mike MacDonald as Laylo Nardeen
- Konnie Krome as Jennifer
- Milan Cheylov as Chadwick Skinner
- Donnie Bowes as Skinner
- Terrea Foster as Miss Renoir
- Wally Wodchis as Christopher Watkins
- Jason Sorokin as Og
- Ruddy Hall as Francois
- Andrew Perkins as Spiz
- Kim Cayer as Swimsuit model
- Darlene Burlie as Miss Kitten
- Kimberly Brooks as Nurse Brigitte
- Anthony Mason as Aerobics Instructor
- David Phillips as Mr. Guy

== Production ==
It was originally known as Cabin Fever and was made by the same producer as Screwballs. Filming started 25 July 1983 at a Northern Ontario camp. The cast was headed by the American comedian Foster Brooks, known for his portrayal of a drunk persona, and Canadian comedian Mike MacDonald.
