= Jody McCrea =

American actor (1934–2009)

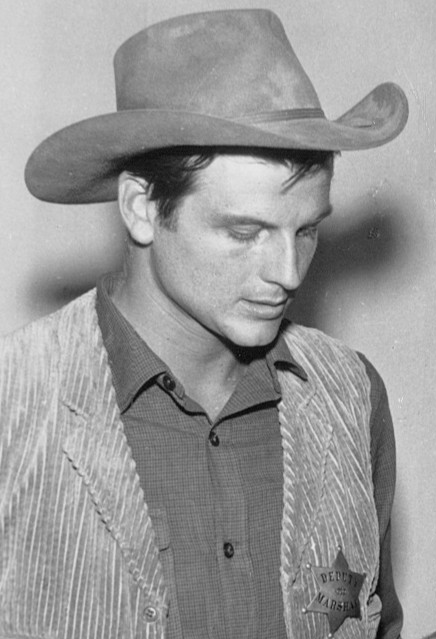
- McCrea in Wichita Town (1959)
- Born: Joel Dee McCrea; September 6, 1934; Los Angeles, California, U.S.
- Died: April 4, 2009 (aged 74); Roswell, New Mexico, U.S.
- Other names: Joel D. McCrea; Joel D. McCrea Jr.
- Occupation: Actor
- Years active: 1955–1985
- Spouse: Dusty Ironwing (m. 1976; died 1996)
- Parent(s): Joel McCrea (father); Frances Dee (mother)

Joel Dee "Jody" McCrea (September 6, 1934 – April 4, 2009) was an American actor. He was the son of actors Joel McCrea and Frances Dee.

== Career ==
McCrea had small roles in his father's film, Wichita (1955). He was also in Lucy Gallant (1955). While still at UCLA he had the lead role in Johnny Moccasin (1956), a half hour film made for television by Laslo Benedek as a white boy raised by Indians after a massacre. McCrea followed this with a good supporting role in a feature starring his father, The First Texan (1956).

McCrea studied under Sanford Meisner for two years in New York City. He appeared on television in Chevron Hall of Stars ("Flowers for Charlie McDaniels"), The George Burns and Gracie Allen Show ("Return to California", "George's Gray Suit", "Fighting for Happiness"), Conflict ("No Man's Road" with Gig Young and Dennis Hopper), Studio One in Hollywood ("Babe in the Woods" – The New York Times said that "his playing was not too resourceful"), Sergeant Preston of the Yukon ("The Criminal Collie"), and Kraft Theatre ("The Last of the Belles").

He had a supporting role in Naked Gun (1956), and The Monster That Challenged the World (1957). He made Trooper Hook (1957) and Gunsight Ridge (1957) with his father and was one of several young names in Lafayette Escadrille (1958) and The Restless Years (1958).

He later briefly hosted Country Style, USA (1957–59), an Army-produced recruiting television program filmed in Nashville, Tennessee, featuring various country music entertainers.

=== Wichita Town ===
In 1959, McCrea costarred with his father in the short-lived NBC western Wichita Town, set in Wichita, Kansas. Joel McCrea appeared as Marshal Mike Dunbar. Jody McCrea did not portray the role of Joel's son on the program but as the deputy marshal, Ben Matheson.

=== 1960s roles ===
McCrea had a small role in All Hands on Deck (1961) and could be seen in the episode, "The Wrestler" on the ABC situation comedy, Guestward Ho!, starring Joanne Dru. He toured the country with The Tiger a production from Moral Rearmament. He did The Moon is Blue and Look Homeward Angel in stock.

McCrea was cast as Lieutenant (later General) John J. Pershing in the 1962 episode, "To Walk with Greatness", on the syndicated television anthology series, Death Valley Days.

In the early 1960s, McCrea guest starred on the CBS game program, I've Got a Secret with Garry Moore. His appearance was part of a group of entertainers related to famous Hollywood personalities.

McCrea had support parts in Force of Impulse (1961) and The Broken Land (1962).

McCrea made Young Guns of Texas (1962) with James Mitchum, look-alike son of Robert Mitchum, and Alana Ladd, daughter of Alan Ladd. James Mitchum, Alana Ladd and Jody McCrea are billed above the title in that order. The film's supporting cast features Chill Wills and Robert Lowery.

=== Beach Party films ===
McCrea had a supporting role in Operation Bikini (1963) at American International Pictures starring Tab Hunter and Frankie Avalon. He impressed the studio enough for them to cast him in a comedic role as dumb-minded Deadhead (Bonehead) in Beach Party (1963), starring Avalon and Annette Funicello.

When cast in the beach pictures, he realized his comedic potential. When first offered the role of Deadhead, for example, he was quoted at the time as saying that he "wasn't sure what the character would become". McCrea felt that the audience enjoyed Deadhead as they felt superior to him.

McCrea was an avid body builder, and the only actor appearing in the American International Pictures beach movies who could surf.

The film was a big hit, and after appearing in Law of the Lawless (1964) and The Greatest Show on Earth, McCrea reprised his performance as Deadhead in Muscle Beach Party (1964) and Bikini Beach (1964).

He recorded a 45 rpm single in 1964 for Canjo Records to coincide with the film Bikini Beach (side A: "Chicken Surfer"/Side B: "Looney Gooney Bird"). He also wrote a script titled Stage to Nowhere which appears not to have been made.

McCrea played the Big Lunk in the 1964 film Pajama Party, with Tommy Kirk and Annette Funicello in the lead parts.

McCrea had a small part in Young Fury (1965) and played Lieutenant Brannin, a cocky cavalry officer based loosely on George Armstrong Custer, in Sam Peckinpah's Major Dundee (1965), but his scene was deleted from the final cut. He also appeared in Wagon Train ("The Betsy Blee Smith Story"), then returned to AIP beach movies with Beach Blanket Bingo (1965). McCrea played Bonehead, again the same character – but it was his biggest role in the series, having a romance with a mermaid. Filmink speculated it was "as if AIP were building him up" as a star.

McCrea was back as Bonehead in How to Stuff a Wild Bikini (1965), the last Beach Party movie in which he appeared. He was replaced by Aaron Kincaid for Ghost in the Invisible Bikini.

=== Later films ===
McCrea guest starred on Vacation Playhouse ("Three on an Island") and Pistols 'n' Petticoats ("The Pilot"). He had a lead role as a biker in The Glory Stompers (1967), and starred in Sam (1967) for Larry Buchanan. He was a judge on Dream Girl of '67.

McCrea had a supporting role in Scream Free! (1968) and the lead in The Girls from Thunder Strip (1970).

McCrea starred in a Western Cry Blood, Apache (1970) which he also produced. He retired after November Children (1972).

== Personal life and death ==
McCrea was married to the former actress Dusty Ironwing, who was a Lakota native American woman, from 1976 until her death in 1996. He raised her children, David Ironwing and Jaquet Ironwing, as his own.

After retiring from films he became a rancher in Roswell, New Mexico, but came out of retirement to appear in 1981 in Lady Street Fighter.

He died in 2009 of a heart attack at the age of 74.

== Filmography ==
Film
Year	Title	Role	Notes
1955	Wichita	Gunman	Uncredited
1955	Lucy Gallant	Tom Dunning	Uncredited; Alternative title: Oil Town
1956	The First Texan	Lt. Baker	
1956	Naked Gun	Young man	Alternative title: The Hanging Judge
1957	The Monster That Challenged the World	Seaman Fred Johnson	
1957	Trooper Hook	Trooper Whittaker	Uncredited
1957	Gunsight Ridge	Groom	
1958	Lafayette Escadrille	Tom Hitchcock	Alternative titles: C'est la guerre Hell Bent for Glory; With You in My Arms
1958	The Restless Years	Bruce Mitchell	Alternative title: The Wonderful Years
1961	All Hands on Deck	Lt. J.G. Schuyler	
1961	Force of Impulse	Phil Anderson	
1962	The Broken Land	Deputy Ed Flynn	
1962	Young Guns of Texas	Jeff Shelby	
1963	Operation Bikini	Seaman William Sherman	Alternative title: The Seafighters
1963	Beach Party	Deadhead	
1964	Law of the Lawless	George Stapleton	Alternative title: Invitation to a Hanging
1964	Muscle Beach Party	Deadhead	
1964	Bikini Beach	Deadhead	
1964	Pajama Party	Big Lunk	
1965	Young Fury	Stone	
1965	Major Dundee	Lt. Brannin	Uncredited
1965	Beach Blanket Bingo	Bonehead	
1965	How to Stuff a Wild Bikini	Bonehead	
1967	The Glory Stompers	Darryl	
1967	Sam		Alternative title: The Hottest Fourth of July in the History of Brewster County
1969	Scream Free!	Agent No. 1	Credited as Joel Dee McCrea; Alternative titles: Free Grass; Street Drugs
1970	The Girls from Thunder Strip	Pike	
1970	Cry Blood, Apache	Pitcalin	Producer
1970	Sioux Nation		
1972	November Children		
1977	Nightmare County		
1981	Lady Streetfighter	Pollitt	Credited as Joel D. McCrea, (final film role)
Television
Year	Title	Role	Notes
1956	Chevron Hall of Stars	Danny	1 episode
1957	Studio One	Bobby Applegate	1 episode
1958	Sergeant Preston of the Yukon	Jerry Turner	1 episode
1958	Kraft Television Theatre		1 episode
1959	Wichita Town	Deputy Ben Matheson	4 episodes
1959	Jukebox Jury	"Juror" commenting on latest release by The Kingston Trio—Raspberries, Strawberries	1 episode
1961	Guestward, Ho!	Danny "Brave Eagle"	1 episode
1962	Death Valley Days	Lt. John F. Pershing	1 episode
1964	The Greatest Show on Earth	Patrick Kelly	1 episode
1965	Wagon Train	Calvin	1 episode
1965	Vacation Playhouse	Julius "Bulldog" Sweetley	1 episode
