= Troy Melton =

American stuntman and actor (1921–1995)

- Born: Troy Wilford Melton; March 2, 1921; Jackson, Tennessee, U.S.
- Died: November 15, 1995 (aged 74); Los Angeles, California, U.S.
- Years active: 1940–1991
- Organization: Stuntmen's Association of Motion Pictures

Troy Wilford Melton (March 2, 1921 – November 15, 1995) was an American stuntman and actor.

== Early life ==
Born in Jackson, Tennessee, Melton migrated with his family to Los Angeles during the Great Depression. After three years of service in the Army Air Corps during World War II, Melton began picking up acting and stunt work in the late 1940s and early 1950s.

== Career ==
Melton is one of the founding members of the Stuntmen's Association of Motion Pictures, and his career spanned over 40 years. Notable actors for whom Melton doubled include Roy Rogers, James Colburn, Richard Webb, Gregory Walcott, Duncan Renaldo in The Cisco Kid, Kent Taylor in Boston Blackie and The Rough Riders, and Martin Landau in Mission: Impossible. He appeared in S3 E14 of "The Wild, Wild West" as Harry in "The Night of the Iron Fist" which aired 12/6/1967.

== Death ==
Melton died in November 1995 of cancer at a hospital in Los Angeles, California, at the age of 74.

== Filmography ==
A partial filmography follows.

=== Film ===
- The Day Mars Invaded Earth (1962)
- Young Guns of Texas (1962)
- Cyborg 2087 (1966) as Tracer #2
- Blazing Saddles (1974)

=== Television ===
- Father Murphy (1982)
- The Dukes of Hazzard (1979-1984)
- Little House on the Prairie (1975-1980)
- The Six Million Dollar Man (1974-1975)
- Mission: Impossible (1973)
- Columbo (1972)
- Mannix (1968-1972)
- Mod Squad (1968-1969)
- Gunsmoke (1966-1974):
  - The Town Tamers (1974) as a Townsman (uncredited)
  - The Fugitives (1972) as Curly Danzig
  - The Wedding (1972) as Pete Calder
  - Captain Sligo (1971) as Rackley
  - Celia (1970) as 2nd Driver
  - The Devil's Outpost (1969) as Mike Lennox
  - Railroad! (1968) as Railroad Worker (uncredited)
  - 9:12 to Dodge (1968) as Miles
  - O'Quillian (1968) as Brawler (uncredited)
  - Blood Money (1968) as Jake Walker
  - The Favor (1967) as Stage Driver
  - The Lure (1967) as Hennington
  - The Returning (1967) as Barton
  - Champion of the World (1966) as Zac
- The Big Valley (1965-1968)
- Laredo (1965-1967)
- The Outer Limits (1964)
- Rawhide (1964)
- The Rifleman (1961-1962)
- The Twilight Zone (1962)
- Bonanza (1959-1972)
- Sea Hunt (1958-1961)
- Bat Masterson (1958-1961)
- Rough Riders (1958-1959)
- The Life and Legend of Wyatt Earp (1957-1961)
- Zane Grey Theatre (1957-1958)
- Maverick (1957-1958)
- The Roy Rogers Show (1956-1957)
- Boston Blackie (1951-1952)
- The Cisco Kid (1950-1955)
