= Julie Darling (film) =

- Theatrical release poster
- Directed by: Paul Nicholas
- Written by: Paul Nicholas; Maurice Smith; James Gordon White
- Produced by: Maurice Smith; Ernest Von Theummer
- Starring: Anthony Franciosa; Sybil Danning; Isabelle Mejias
- Production companies: TAT Productions; Cinequity Corporation
- Release dates: 1982; 1985 (U.S.)
- Running time: 90 minutes
- Countries: Canada; West German
- Language: English

Julie Darling is a 1982 Canadian-West German film written and directed by Paul Nicholas. It was co-written and produced by Maurice Smith. The film was shot in West Germany and Canada.

Director Paul Nicholas and actress Sybil Danning later made Chained Heat together.

== Plot ==
A teenage girl is obsessed with her father and is determined to murder her stepmother.

== Cast ==
- Anthony Franciosa as Harold
- Sybil Danning as Susan
- Isabelle Mejias as Julie
- Paul Hubbard as Weston
- Cindy Girling as Irene
- Reinhard Kolldehoff as Lt. Rossmore
- Michael Tregor as Kirby

== Production ==
Filming took place in late 1981 in Toronto and Mimico (Canada), and Berlin (West Germany).

== Reception ==
The Daily News called it "a fairly tight little sleaze thriller, further hoisted by professional performances, steady pacing and a neat plot twist or two."

Shock Cinema said the film was "Chock full of surprises and shocks, which include attempted child suffocation, bloody shotgun wounds, a broken glass bottle groin-stabbing, and a great knock-out surprise ending, with Danning giving a strong and sympathetic performance to add to the film’s viewing pleasure."
