= Miklós Lente =

Canadian cinematographer and filmmaker

Miklós Lente was a Canadian cinematographer and filmmaker. He was most noted for his work on the 1978 film In Praise of Older Women, for which he won the Canadian Film Award for Best Cinematography at the 29th Canadian Film Awards and the Canadian Society of Cinematographers award for Best Cinematography in a Feature.

After the Canadian Film Awards were renamed to the Genie Awards, he was again nominated in the Best Cinematography category for Agency at the 1st Genie Awards in 1980, and for Suzanne at the 2nd Genie Awards in 1981. He was also a four-time Gemini Award nominee for Best Photography in a Dramatic Program or Series, receiving two nods for the drama series Night Heat, one for the television film The Little Kidnappers and one for the television film Ordeal in the Arctic.

His other cinematography credits included the theatrical films The Girl in Blue, Happy Birthday to Me, Your Ticket Is No Longer Valid, Screwballs and Bedroom Eyes, and the television films Countdown to Looking Glass and The Gunfighters. As a filmmaker he directed the 1984 comedy film Oddballs and episodes of Night Heat, Diamonds and Counterstrike, as well as having photography credits on all three series.

Lente was one of the developers of the 3-perf pulldown process in cinematography.
