= Eva Six =

Hungarian born actress (born 1937)

- Born: Éva Klein; 1937; Budapest, Hungary
- Died: 2000s Budapest, Hungary
- Occupation: Actress
- Years active: 1963–1963 (film)

Eva Six (1937– 2000s) was a Hungarian actress who achieved some fame in the early 1960s as a Zsa Zsa Gabor type.

== Biography ==
She was born Éva Klein in Budapest, Hungary, to a Jewish father and Catholic mother. Her father died during World War II, and her mother changed the family surname to avoid detection by the Nazis. She won a beauty contest after the war. She and her husband fled Hungary following the 1956 uprising and moved to Hollywood in 1960.

James H. Nicholson of American International Pictures put her under contract and changed her name to "Eva Six". She appeared in a number of films before retiring.

After retiring from acting, she and her husband, architect Roy Schmidt, moved back to Budapest, where she died in the early 2000s; she was reported as having died "a few years ago" by the time of Roy Schmidt's death in 2006, as published on his obituary in Los Angeles Times.

== Filmography ==
- Operation Bikini (1963)
- Beach Party (1963)
- Four for Texas (1963)
