= November Children =

- Directed by: Sean MacGregor
- Written by: Sean MacGregor
- Produced by: Maurice Smith; Steve Rossi; R. N. Bullard; Bud Dell
- Cinematography: Louis Horvath; Ken Plotin
- Edited by: Raymond V. Proca
- Production company: Doomsday Company
- Distributed by: Cinema National
- Release date: 1972
- Running time: 75 minutes
- Country: United States
- Language: English

November Children is a 1972 American film written and directed by Sean MacGregor. It was produced by Maurice Smith. It is also known as Doomsday USA.

== Plot ==
After their candidates win control of a farming community in an election, fruit-pickers start getting harassed by the local law enforcement officials.

== Cast ==
- Sean MacGregor
- Gayle Hemingway
- Beau Gibson
- R.N. Bullard
- Woody Lee
- Jody McCrea

== Production ==
The movie was shot in late 1969 in Simi Valley under the title Doomsday USA. Filming took three weeks.
