= Hard on the Trail =

- Directed by: Greg Corarito
- Written by: Greg Corarito
- Produced by: Maurice Smith
- Starring: Lash LaRue
- Cinematography: Gary Graver
- Release date: 1972
- Running time: 78 minutes
- Country: United States
- Language: English

Hard on the Trail is a 1972 American Western softcore pornographic film starring Lash LaRue. It was written and directed by Greg Corarito and produced by Maurice Smith.

== Cast ==
- Lash La Rue as Slade
- Julie Conners as Sue (as Donna Bradley)
- Bob Romero as Rafael
- Bruce Kimball as Ox (as Bruce Kemp)
- Robert Dalton as Bixby
- Arne Dhean as Jaime
- Mary Donahue as Kathy
- Adam Stan as Jim Nesson
- Greg Corarito as Starret

== Production ==
Scenes for this film and Smith's previous film Diamond Stud were shot at Spahn Ranch, which would become known as the primary headquarters of Charles Manson and his cult followers, the "Manson Family."

The film's sex scenes were added without LaRue's knowledge. Some sources claim that learning of this led him to repentance as a missionary for ten years, as he had not been informed of the adult nature of the film and would not have consented to appear in the film. However, LaRue was also quoted in an interview as later saying, "I wasn't connected with the shooting of the dirty stuff. They spliced that in around me... It was an honest mistake on my part. I was duped. I'm sorry I made it, but I'm glad, too, in a way. I got paid for it."
