= Cry Blood, Apache =

1970 film

- Directed by: Jack Starrett
- Written by: Sean MacGregor; Harold Roberts
- Produced by: Jody McCrea; Joel McCrea; Harold Roberts
- Starring: Jack Starrett; Jody McCrea; Dan Kemp
- Cinematography: Bruce Scott
- Edited by: Frances Bills; T. Robinson
- Music by: Elliot Kaplan
- Production companies: Bronco Films; Liberty Entertainment Inc.
- Release date: 1970
- Running time: 82 minutes
- Country: United States
- Language: English

Cry Blood, Apache is a 1970 western film directed by Jack Starrett and assistant director Robert Tessier. The film released by Liberty Entertainment was from an original story by Harold Roberts with a screenplay by Sean MacGregor.

The film runs one hour, 22 minutes. Its distribution was by Golden Eagle International and Goldstone Film Enterprises. The film has been rereleased as part of a 20 movie DVD pack titled Mean Guns by Mill Creek Entertainment.

== Cast ==
- Joel McCrea as older Pitcalin
- Jody McCrea as Pitcalin
- Maria Gahua as Jenne
- Dan Kemp as Vittorio
- Don Henley as Benjie
- Rik Nervik as Billy
- Robert Tessier as Two Card Charlie
- Jack Starrett as The Deacon
- Carolyn Stellar as Cochalla

== See also ==
- List of American films of 1970
