= Mustang Country =

1976 film by John C. Champion

- Directed by: John C. Champion
- Written by: John C. Champion
- Produced by: John C. Champion
- Starring: Joel McCrea
- Cinematography: J. Barry Herron
- Edited by: Douglas Robertson
- Music by: Lee Holdridge
- Production company: Universal Pictures
- Distributed by: Universal Pictures
- Release date: April 22, 1976
- Running time: 79 minutes
- Country: United States
- Language: English

Mustang Country is a 1976 Western film directed by John C. Champion. It stars American actor Joel McCrea, and was his last major film. It co-stars Robert Fuller, Patrick Wayne, and Nika Mina.

== Plot summary ==
The film, set in 1925 along the Montana-Canada border, is about a rancher and former rodeo star named Dan (Joel McCrea) and his rottweiler Luke. While trying to capture an elusive mustang nicknamed "Shoshone", Dan comes across a runaway boy from an American Indian boarding school. A friendship soon grows and the two set out to catch the wild stallion together.

== Cast ==
- Joel McCrea: Dan
- Robert Fuller: Griff
- Patrick Wayne: Tee Jay
- Nika Mina: Nika. There is no record of this indigenous American young actor making further movies.

== Awards ==
In 1976, the film won a Western Heritage Trustees Award for outstanding family entertainment in a western motion picture.

== See also ==
- List of films about horses
