= Canes (film) =

- Directed by: Michael Bavaro
- Written by: Michael Angelella
- Release date: 2006
- Country: Canada
- Language: English

Canes is a 2006 Canadian film directed by Michael Bafaro and produced by Maurice Smith.

It is also known as The Covenant: Brotherhood of Evil and sometimes a The Covenant 2: Brotherhood of Evil.

== Cast ==
- Edward Furlong
- Michael Madsen
- Chandra West

== Reception ==
Dread Central called it "derivative and dreadfully dull from beginning to end."

David Greenberg of Home Media Retailing wrote: "For such an apparently modestly budgeted film, the special effects are uniformly of high quality, despite the lackluster story."

Frank Heinen of Cinemagazine rated the film 2 stars out of 5.
