= Love, Swedish Style =

- Directed by: Maurice Smith
- Written by: Maurice Smith
- Story by: John C. Harris; Marvin Rothman; James Bacon (articles, uncredited)
- Produced by: Maurice Smith; John C. Harris
- Starring: Karen Ciral; Ted Roter; Woody Lee; Arne Warde
- Cinematography: Louis Horvath
- Edited by: R. A. Proca
- Music by: Jim Christopher
- Distributed by: Screencom International (United States); Astral Films (Canada)
- Release date: 1972
- Running time: 83 minutes
- Country: United States
- Language: English

Love, Swedish Style is a 1972 American sex comedy film directed by Maurice Smith.

== Plot ==
News that a famous Detroit car designer has hired a beautiful Swedish girl as his maid spread enough that countless rich and famous suitors line up behind her.

== Cast ==
- Karen Ciral as Inga Johanson
- Ted Roter as Dr. Larry Becker (as Peter Balakoff)
- Woody Lee as Sterling Phillips
- Arne Warde as Eddie
- Jane Tsentis

== Reception ==
The Boston Globe said it had "an ample sample of horseflesh."

The Journal and Courier called it "about as erotic as a peanut butter sandwich (without jelly) and about as blah as white bread."
