= Murdercycle =

- Directed by: Thomas L. Callaway (as Tom Callaway)
- Written by: Daniel Elliot; Neal Marshall Stevens (as Benjamin Carr)
- Produced by: Kirk Edward Hansen; Charles Band; Donald Kushner; Peter Locke; Maurice Smith; Dana Scanlan
- Cinematography: Thomas L. Callaway (as Tom Callaway)
- Edited by: Gregory Sanders
- Music by: David Arkenstone
- Production companies: Action Xtreme; The Kushner-Locke Company
- Distributed by: Full Moon Entertainment (United States, 1999, VHS); Shadow Entertainment (United States, 2004, DVD)
- Release date: 1999
- Running time: 90 minutes
- Country: United States
- Language: English

Murdercycle is a 1999 American action science fiction horror film directed by Thomas L. Callaway.

== Plot ==
An alien being is on a mission to destroy the one person on earth that prevents its immortality.

== Cast ==
- Charles Wesley
- Cassandra Ellis
- Robert Donavan

== Reception ==
Retrospective critical assessment insisted on the poor filmic qualities of the production. According to Mutant Reviewers, the film "belongs to a category of B-movies that invest in many time-wasting and pointless scenes because there's no budget for anything else." Moria called it "a modestly interesting little B film. The central idea of an alien-possessed motorcycle is rather silly but the film carries it off surprisingly well." Collider considers the film is "so-bad-it's-good" and "with awesome costume designs reminiscent of the '90s Power Rangers, it's hard to decide who to root for." Senseless Cinema wrote that "[a]s a lighthearted, high-concept film with some budgetary limitations, Murdercycle excels, and it is unfortunate the potential sequel set up by the finale never materialized," adding that "[n]evertheless, the film is a gem that wears its identity as light fantasy entertainment on its sleeve," and concludes saying, in reference to various characters being named after comic book writers, that "given the sometimes troubled history of Marvel Comics it can only be considered uplifting to have characters named Lee, Kirby, and Ditko riding off together happily into the sunset."
