= Maurice Smith (producer) =

British film producer

Maurice Smith is a British-born film producer. He is best known for his work in exploitation films in the United States and Canada.

Smith's producing career started with the biker films The Glory Stompers and The Cycle Savages. He then made Free Grass, which became Scream Free!. In the early 1970s, Smith made a series of softcore films with Gregory Corarito, including Diamond Stud.

Some films Smith produced took several years to be released, such as November Children, whch was filmed in 1969 and released in 1972.

Smith's first film with Roger Corman was Screwballs, shot in Canada. He followed this with Oddballs.

== Personal life ==
Smith was married to Terrea Oster, a teacher who appeared in several of his movies. They have four children, three boys and a girl. Two of the sons are actors, Douglas Smith and Gregory Smith.

== Selected filmography ==
- The Glory Stompers (1967) - executive producer
- The Cycle Savages (1969)
- Scream Free! (1969) aka Free Grass - producer
- Diamond Stud (1970) - writer, assistant producer
- November Children (1972, filmed 1969) - producer
- Love, Swedish Style (1972) - also directed
- Hard on the Trail (1972)
- How Come Nobody's on Our Side? (1974, filmed 1972) - producer
- Delinquent School Girls (1975) aka Carnal Madness - producer
- Julie Darling (1982)
- Screwballs (1983) - producer
- Spasms (1983)
- Oddballs (1984) - producer
- Screwballs II (1985) - producer
- Recruits (1986) - producer
- Grotesque (1988)
- Screwball Hotel (1988) - producer
- Flesh Gordon Meets the Cosmic Cheerleaders (1990)
- Curse of the Crystal Eye (1991)
- Demon Keeper (1994)
- Death Game (1996)
- Murdercycle (1999)
- Totally Blonde (2001)
- Trancers 6 (2002)
- Canes (2006)
- Alien Agent (2007)
- Immortally Yours (2009)
- Forget Me Not (2009)
