= Young Guns of Texas =

1962 film by Maury Dexter

- Directed by: Maury Dexter
- Written by: Harry Spalding (as Henry Cross)
- Produced by: Maury Dexter
- Starring: James Mitchum; Alana Ladd; Jody McCrea
- Cinematography: John M. Nickolaus Jr.
- Edited by: Richard Einfeld
- Music by: Paul Sawtell; Bert Shefter
- Color process: Color by DeLuxe
- Production company: Associated Producers
- Distributed by: 20th Century Fox
- Release date: November 1962
- Running time: 78 minutes
- Country: United States
- Language: English

Young Guns of Texas is a 1962 American Western film directed by Maury Dexter and starring James Mitchum, Alana Ladd and Jody McCrea. The supporting cast features Chill Wills, Gary Conway and Robert Lowery.

== Plot ==
Tyler Duane (Gary Conway) is expelled from West Point after the Civil War when his brother, a Union officer, is accused of stealing Army funds.

== Cast ==
- James Mitchum as Morgan Coe
- Alana Ladd as Lily Glendenning
- Jody McCrea as Jeff Shelby
- Chill Wills as Preacher Sam Shelby
- Gary Conway as Tyler Duane
- Barbara Mansell as Martha Jane Canary
- Robert Lowery as Jesse Glendenning
- Troy Melton as Luke
- Fred Krone as Pike - Glendenning's Foreman
- Alex Sharp as Red
- Robert Hinkle as Sheriff Simon
- Will Wills as Charlie

== Production ==
Filming took place in August 1962 in Big Bend National Park, Texas. Saguaro cacti, seen throughout the film, however, only grow in Arizona, necessitating filming in Tucson, Arizona's old Tucson Studios.
