= Charlie Applewhite =

American singer and radio host

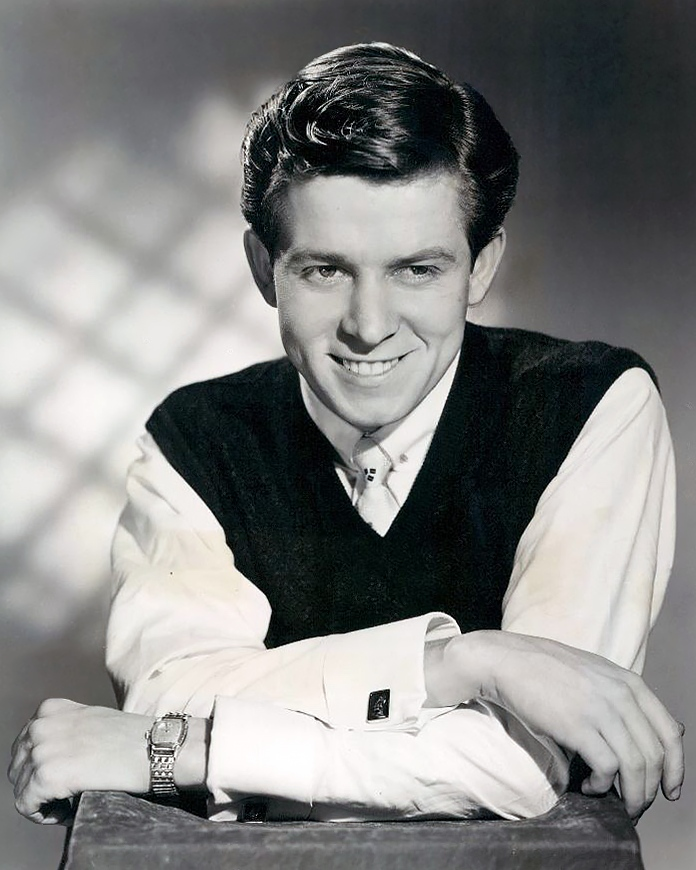
- Charlie Applewhite promotional photo, 1954

Background information
- Born: Charles Edwin Applewhite; November 25, 1932; Fort Worth, Texas, United States
- Died: April 27, 2001 (aged 68) Plano, Texas, United States
- Genres: Pop
- Occupations: Singer, businessman
- Years active: 1953–1967
- Labels: Decca Records, MGM Records
- Formerly of: Milton Berle

Charlie Applewhite (November 25, 1932 – April 27, 2001) was an American singer and radio host. The height of his fame came as a regular on the Milton Berle show in the mid 1950s, and he became a highly-paid entertainer, performing on records, radio, and television. The advent of the Rock era and a plane crash that left him severely injured curtailed his career.

== Biography ==
=== Early years ===
Charles Edwin Applewhite was born on November 25, 1932, in Fort Worth, Texas. Applewhite was taught to sing by his mother, who was part of a church choir. He began singing in local children's talent shows at age 4. Applewhite's mother began to groom her young son to become a professional singer at an early age. His first professional performance occurred at the age of 10, singing in a Fort Worth movie theater. After young Applewhite became old enough to go into downtown Fort Worth alone, he would travel there to sing for money on street corners if his allowance had run out.

At R. L. Paschal High School, Applewhite learned how to read music and played trumpet in the school band. After his graduation, Applewhite worked for a short time in the oil fields. When he broke his arm in a work-related accident, Applewhite quit his job and went back to Fort Worth His first job after returning home was singing in a Dallas night club for five dollars a night. This led to a more lucrative offer from Carswell Air Force Base to entertain at their Officers Club for US$100 per week. Applewhite then received an offer to become a singing waiter at the Studio Lounge in Dallas. After working at the Studio Lounge for a time, Applewhite was offered night club engagements in Shreveport, Louisiana and Kansas City, Missouri.

=== Young professional ===
At age 21, he left Texas for New York City, attempting to make a career as a performer. Applewhite closed his US$600 savings account, using the money to pay for his New York trip. His "big break" came of his own initiative; three days after arriving in New York and being turned down by every agent he contacted, he boldly ignored the office personnel and, unannounced, entered the office of Milton Berle and demanded that he be auditioned. Berle acquiesced in thoughts of appeasing him, but was impressed to the point of signing Applewhite to a contract to appear regularly on Berle's show. Before leaving Berle's office, Applewhite was also signed to a contract with Decca Records; his first appearance on Milton Berle's television show was December 1, 1953. While working on the Berle program, Applewhite was a regular cast member of The Morning Show, along with female vocalist Edie Adams, while Jack Paar was the host. After Paar moved to a weekday afternoon television program at CBS, he brought Applewhite and the other cast members to the new show.

Applewhite was divorced from his high school sweetheart in 1956, which led to his being reclassified as 1A for service. (Note: Applewhite married his first wife November 13, 1951. At the time of the divorce, the couple had two children, Angela and Charles.) He was drafted into the United States Army, serving from 1956 until 1958. At the time he was drafted, Applewhite was earning US$100,000 a year; he was making many guest appearances on television and hosted more than six regular radio programs. Private Applewhite was given a one-week leave from his army duties in June 1956; he appeared as the star of a General Electric Theater presentation. While in the service he hosted a radio show produced by the Army, promoting the Army, entitled Country Style, USA which featured leading country music talent. He also hosted another radio show that featured mainstream popular music talent. At one point he found himself hosting 17 weekly shows for the Army. Applewhite also recorded with the United States Army Band during his two years as a soldier. While still in the army in 1957, Applewhite married his second wife, Nancy English of Dallas. After discharge he maintained residence in New York, but developed interests in his native North Texas, owning the Gaslight Club in Dallas.

In September 1961 he was in a plane crash in Midland, Texas that took the life of his second wife, and an oil-executive friend while leaving Charlie unconscious and in critical condition. Applewhite, a licensed pilot, was at the controls of the single engine aircraft when it crashed into a field near the Midland Airport. It took a year for Applewhite to recover from his injuries. Because of the injuries to his face, Applewhite needed plastic surgery; he hoped he would then be able to make a comeback.

=== Later years ===
Applewhite moved from New York to Lafayette, Louisiana in 1965. Retiring from the entertainment industry in 1967, he moved back to Fort Worth and started an office supply business. Although he ended his professional career, he enjoyed embarrassing his family by singing in public areas. After suffering a stroke, he died in Plano, Texas in a nursing home on April 27, 2001. Applewhite was married at least twice, and had two sons and two daughters.

== Style ==
Appelwhite's voice was in the baritone register. Applewhite desired to model his style after Frank Sinatra. He was billed as "the little man with the big voice." He considered rock singers to be "the enemy" and blamed them for the decline of his popularity.

== Television ==
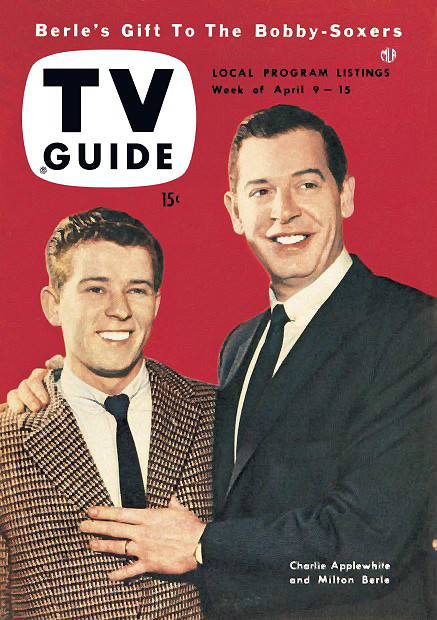
TV Guide cover for April 9, 1954

In addition to appearing regularly on Berle's Texaco Star Theatre and the Paar programs, Applewhite also appeared on the television shows of Jackie Gleason, Arthur Murray and Ed Sullivan.

== Recordings ==
For Decca Records three of his singles charted on Billboard. The first, entitled "Cabbages and Kings" occurred in February 1954. Released on Decca 29001, it appeared on the charts for two weeks and peaked at number 28. His next hit occurred in April that year. "This Is You" (Decca 29055) was his most popular recording according to Billboard, charting four weeks and reaching number 21. His last charting single appeared in June of that same year. "No One But You" (Decca 29125) appeared on the chart in singular instance, at position number 26. Other popular recordings included "Ebb Tide", "I Could Have Danced All Night", and "I Love Paris". He released singles for MGM Records in 1956. He was briefly signed to RKO/Unique Records in 1957. Later in 1957, Applewhite signed with budget label Design Records, making an album for them entitled Our Love Affair. He was also included in that label's first release of singles.
