= Sam (1967 film) =

1967 film

- Directed by: Larry Buchanan
- Written by: Larry Buchanan
- Produced by: Larry Buchanan
- Starring: Jody McCrea; Pat Delaney
- Release date: 1967
- Country: United States
- Language: English

Sam is a 1967 American Western film directed by Larry Buchanan.

== See also ==
- List of American films of 1967
