= Flip Mark =

American film and television actor

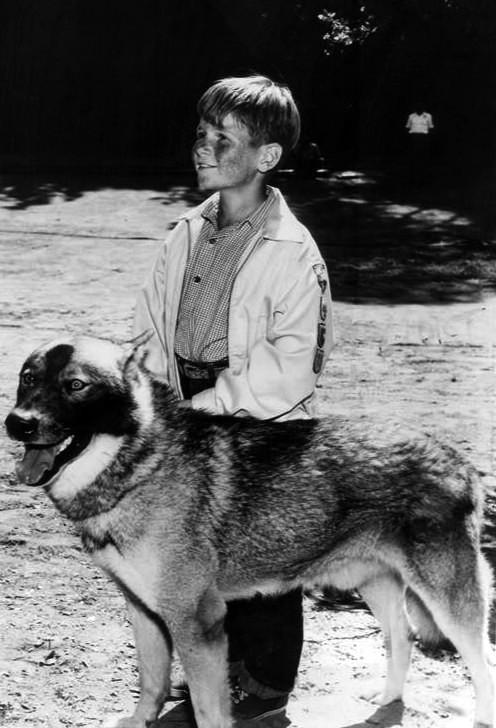
- Mark in Guestward, Ho!, 1961
- Born: December 22, 1948 (age 76); New York, U.S.
- Occupation(s): Film and television actor
- Years active: 1957–1972

Flip Mark (born December 22, 1948) is an American film and television actor. He is known for playing the role of Brook Hooten in the American sitcom TV series Guestward, Ho!.

== Life and career ==
Mark was born in New York City. At the age of two, he lived with his family in Fresh Meadows, Queens. Mark worked as a model. He had a passion for baseball and was a fan of the New York Yankees. He attended the Professional Children's School.

Mark began his career in 1957, first appearing in the mystery drama TV series Suspicion. He then made two guest-starring appearances in the sitcom The Phil Silvers Show. In 1959, Mark made his film debut in The Journey, which starred Deborah Kerr, Yul Brynner and Jason Robards. He played the role of Flip Rhinelander. He guest-starred in television programs including Have Gun – Will Travel, The Andy Griffith Show, My Three Sons, The Fugitive, Mission: Impossible, The Patty Duke Show, The Big Valley, My Favorite Martian, The Jack Benny Program, Bachelor Father and The Outer Limits.

In 1960, Mark starred in the new ABC sitcom Guestward, Ho!, where he played the role of Brook Hooten. He played recurring roles such as Flip Rogers in Lassie and Steve Olson in Days of Our Lives. In 1962, Mark starred in the new CBS sitcom Fair Exchange, where he played the role of the son, Larry Walker. He appeared in films such as Safe at Home!, Marriage on the Rocks and Please Don't Eat the Daisies, the last as George Mackay. He retired in 1972, and his final credit was from the television series The Streets of San Francisco.
