= Diamond Stud =

- Directed by: Greg Corarito
- Written by: Maurice Smith
- Produced by: Jay Fineberg; David F. Friedman (uncredited)
- Starring: Robert Hall
- Production company: Walnut International
- Release date: 1982
- Running time: 82 minutes
- Country: United States
- Language: English

Diamond Stud is a 1970 American softcore pornographic film about Diamond Jim Brady. It was written by Maurice Smith, produced by Jim Fineberg and directed by Greg Corarito.

== Plot ==
A dramatization about the successful railroad entrepreneur Diamond Jim Brady, described as a "two-bit chiselling son-of-a-bitch". He rides his personal train around the country, smoking cigars, eating too much food and having love affairs.

== Cast ==
- Robert Hall as Diamond Jim Brady
- John Alderman
- Monika Henreid
- Julie Conners

== Production ==
Fineberg and Corarito had just collaborated on The Fabulous Bastard. The film was described by news articles at the time of its filming as more ambitious than a typical softcore film of the time.

Fineberg, Smith and Corarito would re-team on Hard on the Trail (1971). Scenes for both films were shot at Spahn Ranch, which would become known as the primary headquarters of Charles Manson and his cult followers, the "Manson Family." According to Something Weird Video magazine, a catfight scene between two naked women was performed by two of the Manson Family's women. Corarito said, "We got the Manson girls wrestling naked. And Manson was like in the background but we never messed with him. He was just always in the shadows. I never even said 'hello' to him."
