= Loren Janes =

American stunt performer (1931–2017)

- Born: October 1, 1931; Sierra Madre, California
- Died: June 24, 2017 (aged 85); Los Angeles, California
- Occupation: Stuntman

Loren Janes (October 1, 1931 – June 24, 2017) was an American stuntman, notable for his work in Hollywood films, particularly those starring Steve McQueen, including Bullitt, Nevada Smith, and The Hunter. He also co-founded the Stuntmen's Association of Motion Pictures in 1961. In 1956, he was the first civilian to enter the United States Olympic Trials for pentathlon; he also competed in 1964. He is a member of the Hollywood Stuntmen's Hall of Fame.

He also has a footnote contribution to television, having played the role of Norman Chaney on the TV series L.A. Law. In the first scene of the first episode, Chaney is found dead, though his name appears for years in the name of the law firm.

Janes died at age 85 on June 24, 2017. He was said by his family to have suffered from Alzheimer's disease.

== Filmography ==
Year	Title	Role	Notes
1956	Hold Back the Night	Lt. Bishop	Uncredited
1958	High School Confidential	Bert	Uncredited
1958	The Buccaneer	Tumbler	Uncredited
1959	Thunder in the Sun	Minor Role	Uncredited
1959	The Mating Game	Sherm	Uncredited
1960	Spartacus	Salt Mine Slave / Gladiator / Slave General	Uncredited
1963	A Ticklish Affair	Hayward	Uncredited
1965	The Sons of Katie Elder	Ned Reese	Uncredited
1966	Wild Wild Winter	The Bear	
1966	Nevada Smith	Cowboy in Abilene Hotel / Convict in Prison Camp	Uncredited
1966	The Sand Pebbles	Coleman	
1967	The King's Pirate	Zucco's Troop	
1978	The Lord of the Rings		Voice
1979	Americathon	Stage Hand	
1981	Force: Five	Hank	
1985	Runaway Train	Engineer Eastbound 12	
1988	Dead Heat	Man In Room	Uncredited
1988	Lovers, Partners & Spies	Ian	
1989	Prancer	Mr. Soot	
1993	Hot Shots! Part Deux	Man hit by board	Uncredited
1994	True Lies	Man in Elevator	Uncredited
2002	Spider-Man	Board of Directors Member	Uncredited, (final film role)
