= The Devil's 8 =

1969 film by Burt Topper

- Directed by: Burt Topper
- Screenplay by: John Milius; Willard Huyck; James Gordon White
- Story by: Larry Gordon
- Produced by: Burt Topper
- Starring: Christopher George; Fabian; Tom Nardini; Leslie Parrish; Larry Bishop; Cliff Osmond; Ross Hagen; Ralph Meeker
- Cinematography: Richard C. Glouner
- Edited by: Fred R. Feitshans Jr.
- Music by: Jerry Styner; Michael Lloyd
- Production company: American International Pictures
- Distributed by: AIP
- Release date: April 9, 1969
- Running time: 97 minutes
- Country: United States
- Language: English

The Devil's 8 is a 1969 film directed by Burt Topper and starring Christopher George, Fabian, Tom Nardini and Leslie Parrish. It was produced and distributed by American International Pictures.

== Plot ==
Federal agent Ray Faulkner poses as a road gang convict and arranges the escape of a group of hardened chain-gang criminals. He forces them at gunpoint into a helicopter. In a flashback, Faulkner wants to take on local crime boss Burl, who runs a moonshine ring and has a great deal of political power in the state. Faulkner persuades the convicts to work on the side of the law by promising them paroles. He heads a team of eight men composed of himself, six prisoners and a fellow agent. The team includes:

- Sonny, a man in prison for murder who is a good driver but has a drinking problem.
- Frank Davis, a former driver for the syndicate who is at first opposed to the idea but then discovers that the mob murdered his brother.
- Henry Reed, a black prisoner who is a good driver.
- Billy Jo, a mechanic who wants to drive.
- Sam, a prisoner who likes to fight.
- Chandler, a man who refuses to fight and reads the Bible.
- Stewart Martin, a federal agent on his first assignment.

Faulkner trains the men in high-speed driving and hurling lighted bombs at pinpoint targets.

The team starts intercepting the moonshiners' delivery cars until Burl is forced to give Faulkner and his men a share of the illegal whiskey operation and allow them to make the deliveries. Burl arranges for Faulkner and Martin to be ambushed by crooked police while making a moonshine run, and Martin is shot down from a police helicopter. Sonny has learned the location of Burl's stills and the team attacks with their specially equipped cars and carefully timed explosives. During the battle, Burl tries to escape by using his mistress Cissy as a hostage, but Faulkner captures him. Cissy is reunited with Davis, and Burl is taken to prison.

== Cast ==
- Christopher George as Ray Faulkner
- Fabian as Sonny
- Tom Nardini as Billy Joe
- Leslie Parrish as Cissy
- Ralph Meeker as Burl
- Ron Rifkin as Stewart Martin
- Cliff Osmond as Bubba
- Larry Bishop as Chandler
- Robert DoQui as Henry Reed
- Ross Hagen as Frank Davis
- Baynes Barron as Bureau chief
- Joseph Turkel as Sam
- Lada Edmund Jr. as Inez
- Marjorie Dayne as Hallie
- Roy Thiel as Guard
- Tex Armstrong as Charley
- Lynda Day George as Ray's Girlfriend (uncredited)

== Production ==
The film was based on a story by Larry Gordon, a story editor at American International Pictures. The first draft was written by James Gordon White, who had written several films for AIP, but White was then assigned to Killers Three. White says the original version was meant to star Jack Palance but he pulled out of the film to make Che! so AIP decided to rewrite it for younger actors. The script was rewritten by Gordon's assistants John Milius and Willard Huyck, both working summer jobs in AIP's story department after studying at USC.

According to Milius, he and Huyck were given two weeks to rewrite the script but they completed it in ten days. He said: "I don't think we ever thought it was our best work. It was pretty good; it was funny... a lot of noise but not very good action." Milius says that the film was a deliberate attempt to copy The Dirty Dozen: "It was called The Devil's 8 because they didn't have enough money for a full dozen." White said that Milius and Hyuck were assigned "to get their experience and screen credit" but that he disliked the final film: "They took the Southern flavor out of it and I'm from the south, so I know from whereof I talk." White did not visit the set because of personal differences with director Burt Topper.

Fabian had signed a seven-picture contract with AIP and this was his sixth film for the studio. The others had been Fireball 500, Thunder Alley, Dr Goldfoot and the Girl Bombs, Maryjane and The Wild Racers. A Bullet for Pretty Boy would be his last for AIP. This was his last film billed as simply Fabian; he was later billed as Fabian Forte. Larry Bishop is the son of Joey Bishop and had signed a five-year contract with AIP.

During production, the film was titled Inferno Road. Filming began on October 15, 1968, and occurred primarily at Pinecrest Camp in the San Bernardino Mountains outside Los Angeles. Mike Curb was credited as the film's musical director and wrote the title song with Guy Hemric.

== Reception ==
The film opened in Los Angeles on April 9, 1969 in 15 theatres and grossed $67,000 in its first week.

In a contemporary review for the Los Angeles Times, critic Kevin Thomas called The Devil's 8 "an amiably preposterous, rambunctious picture ... As silly as it is, The Devil's 8 at least moves mercifully fast, has a sense of humor and packs plenty of action."

Variety wrote "a weak screenplay, trite dialog and names with little saleable marquee value make this a dubious entry for anything other than the drive-in and lesser grind house trade. Appeal should be to the hot rod and action market."

In The New York Times, critic A. H. Weiler reviewed the film together with Killers Three and wrote: "The hillbillies and other hard types who crashed on to local screens yesterday expend enough muscle and firepower to take Omaha Beach in a pair of elementary adventures as flimsy as cartoons." Of the film's protagonists, Weiler wrote: "Their training would be worthy of commandos versed in brawling, breakneck car handling, grenade throwing, machine gunning, and sundry diversions. It's enough to make a man forget about booze and movie making."

== See also ==
- List of American films of 1969

== Notes ==
- Segaloff, Nat, "John Milius: The Good Fights", Backstory 4: Interviews with Screenwriters of the 1970s and 1980s, Ed. Patrick McGilligan, Uni of California 2006 p 274-316
