= Country Style, USA =

Country Style, USA is a series of 15-minute radio and film programs produced by the US Army as a recruiting aid from 1957 to 1960 featuring top American country music artists. Each year 13 episodes were produced in Nashville, Tennessee, and distributed to local radio and TV stations. Among the hosts were Jody McCrea and Charlie Applewhite. Artists featured on the shows included Johnny Cash, Moon Mullican, and Jim Reeves.

The programs were produced by Owen Bradley and his brother Harold, with some being produced at their Quonset Hut Studio. They should not be confused with the 1950 DuMont TV series, Country Style.

The series was released on DVD by season in 2008.
