= Screwballs =

1983 film by Rafal Zielinski

- Theatrical release poster
- Directed by: Rafal Zielinski
- Written by: Linda Shayne; Jim Wynorski
- Produced by: Maurice Smith; Nicky Fylan; Peter McQuillan; Roger Corman
- Starring: Peter Keleghan; Lynda Speciale; Linda Shayne; Kent Deuters
- Cinematography: Miklós Lente
- Edited by: Brian Ravok
- Music by: Tim McCauley
- Distributed by: New World Pictures
- Release date: 1983
- Running time: 80 minutes
- Country: Canada
- Language: English
- Budget: $800,000
- Box office: $2,082,215

Screwballs is a 1983 Canadian teen sex comedy film directed by Rafal Zielinski and released by New World Pictures. It was one of several films inspired by the success of Porky's.

== Plot ==
In 1965, five boys at Taft and Adams High School try to see the bare breasts of Purity Bush, the most beautiful girl in school. After being set up, reprimanded and sent to detention by the principal because of Purity, they plot their revenge.

After several failed attempts to strip or seduce her, the boys finally strip Purity by using a powerful electromagnet to rip off her dress while she sings the national anthem at the homecoming assembly, leaving her naked in front of the entire school.

== Cast ==
- Peter Keleghan as Rick McKay
- Kent Deuters as Brent Van Dusen III
- Linda Speciale as Purity Busch
- Alan Deveau as Howie Bates
- Linda Shayne as Bootsie Goodhead
- Jason Warren as Melvin Jerkovski
- James Coburn as Tim Stevenson (credited as Jim Coburn)
- Terrea Smith as Rhonda Rockett (credited as Terrea Foster)
- Donnie Bowes as Principal Stuckoff
- Kimberly Brooks as Miss Boulder
- Nicky Fylan as Vince "The Prince"
- Paula Farmer as Miss Shivers
- Joe Crozier as Ward Busch
- Heather Smith as June Busch
- Nola Wale as Mrs. Roach
- Nanci Chambers as Trischa (credited as Nancy Chambers)
- John Fox as The MC
- Jan Taylor Hendricks as Sarah Bellum (credited as Jan Taylor)
- Carolyn Tweedle as Librarian (credited as Caroline Tweedle)
- John Glossop as "Moose" Reardon
- Raven De La Croix as Miss Anna Tommical (credited as Raven DeLaCroix)

== Production ==
Following the success of Porky's (1981), producer Roger Corman told Linda Shayne, who had worked for him, that he was interested in a low budget teen sex comedy. Shayne wrote one with Jim Wynorski, who did Corman's advertising and had written scripts for him. Corman liked the script, originally entitled Hide the Salami, and agreed to provide $500,000 of the budget. Shayne arranged for the balance to be found in Canada where the film was shot. The rest of the money came from the Canadian Film Development Corporation, a Canadian physician and a Canadian theatre chain. Filming took place in Toronto.

The movie was originally called Crazy Times and was set in 1962 but then this was shifted to 1964.

Jim Wynorski designed the poster and said that he was inspired by Mad magazine. Linda Shayne posed for the blonde figure on the poster.

== Reception ==
=== Box office ===
The film was released in U.S. theaters by New World Pictures in April 1983 and grossed $2,082,215.

=== Critical response ===
Variety magazine called the film "a poor man's Porky's... full of youthful exuberance and proves utterly painless to watch, but it is so close in premise and tone to its model that negative comparisons can't help but be drawn". Robert Ebert of The Chicago Sun-Times gave the film one star out of a possible four, proclaiming the movie had "a couple of good moments" and was "fairly harmless", yet spoiled by poor editing and reliance on predictable scenes which were "recycled from every dirty joke book in history."

At Metacritic, the film has a score of 34 out of 100 based on seven reviews.

== Sequels ==
The film led to two sequels, Screwballs II (1985) and Screwball Hotel (1988).
