= Joel McCrea =

American actor (1905–1990)

- McCrea in a 1930s publicity portrait
- Born: Joel Albert McCrea; November 5, 1905; South Pasadena, California, U.S.
- Died: October 20, 1990 (aged 84); Los Angeles, California, U.S.
- Resting place: Remains scattered into the Pacific Ocean
- Education: Pomona College
- Years active: 1927–1976
- Spouse: Frances Dee (m. 1933)
- Children: 3, including Jody McCrea

Joel Albert McCrea (November 5, 1905 – October 20, 1990) was an American actor whose career as a leading man spanned a wide variety of genres over almost five decades, including comedy, drama, romance, thrillers, adventures, and Westerns, for which he became best known.

McCrea appeared in over 100 films, starring in over 80, between 1927 and 1976. He starred in three Best Picture Oscar nominees: William Wyler's Dead End (1937), Alfred Hitchcock's espionage thriller Foreign Correspondent (1940), and George Stevens' romantic comedy The More the Merrier (1943).

His other notable films included Preston Sturges' comedies Sullivan's Travels (1941) and The Palm Beach Story (1942), Bird of Paradise (1932) The Most Dangerous Game (1932), Bed of Roses (1933), These Three and Come and Get It (both 1936), and a number of Westerns, including Barbary Coast (1935), Wichita (1955) as Wyatt Earp, and Sam Peckinpah's Ride the High Country (1962). With the exception of the British thriller Rough Shoot (1953) and film noir Hollywood Story (1951), McCrea appeared in Western films exclusively from 1946 until his retirement in 1976.

== Early life and education ==
McCrea was born in South Pasadena, California, the son of Thomas McCrea, an executive with the L.A. Gas & Electric Company, and Louise "Lou" Whipple. As a boy, he had a paper route delivering the Los Angeles Times to Cecil B. DeMille and other people in the film industry. He also had the opportunity to watch D. W. Griffith filming Intolerance, and was an extra in a serial starring Ruth Roland.

McCrea graduated from Hollywood High School and then Pomona College (class of 1928.) There he had acted on stage and took courses in drama and public speaking, while also appearing regularly at the Pasadena Playhouse. In 1928 he also met Wyatt Earp in Hollywood – later in 1955, McCrea would portray Earp in the film, Wichita. As a high school student McCrea worked as a stunt double and held horses for Hollywood cowboy stars William S. Hart and Tom Mix. McCrea had a love and understanding of horses from an early age, and later he was considered one of the best riders in Western films.

The strapping 6'2½" McCrea variously worked as an extra, stunt performer, and bit player from 1927 to 1928, when he signed a contract with MGM. He was cast in a major role in The Jazz Age (1929), and got his first leading role that year in The Silver Horde. He moved to RKO in 1930, where he established himself as a handsome and versatile leading man capable of starring in both dramas and comedies.

== Career ==
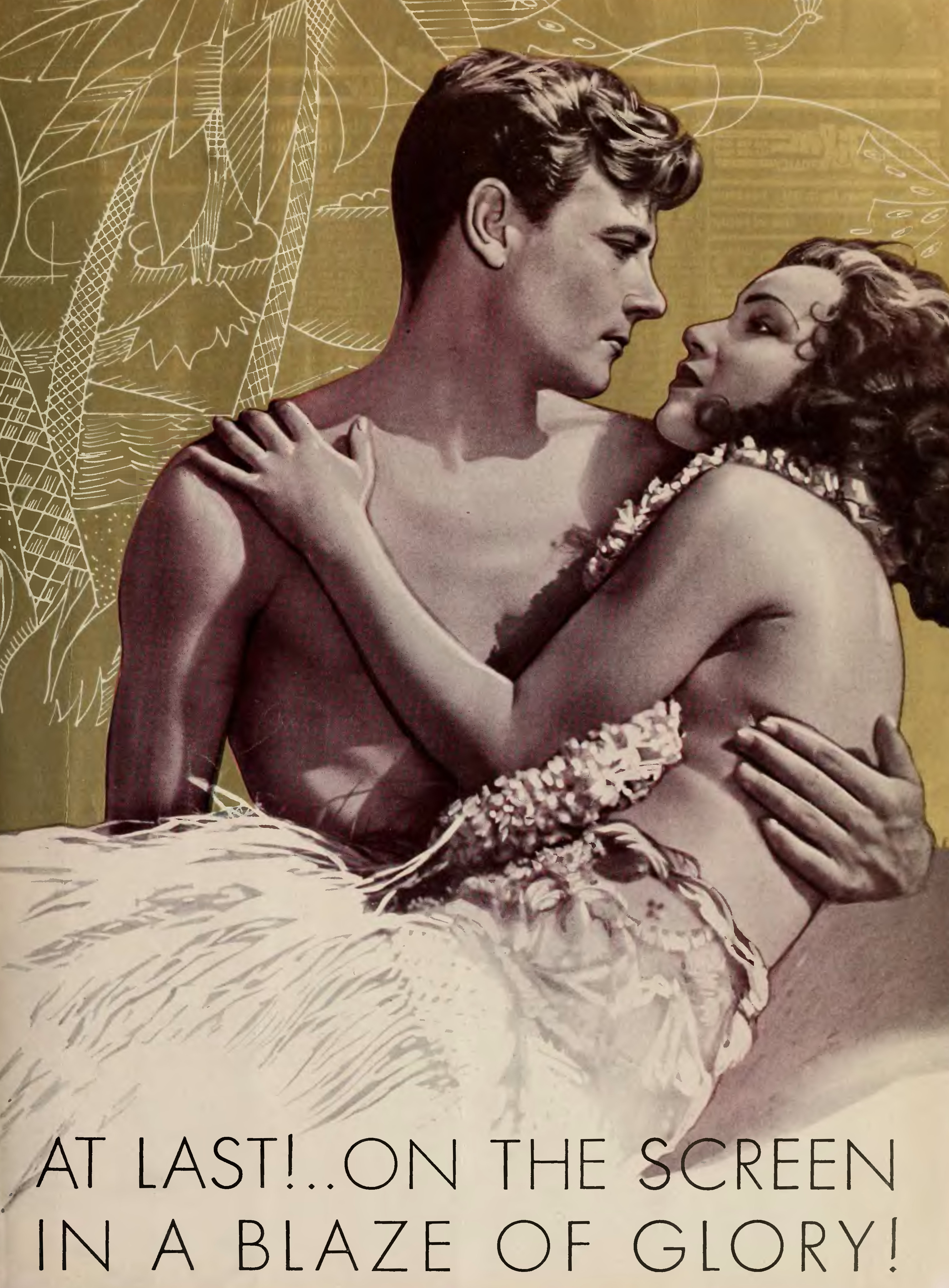
Ad of Joel McCrea and Dolores del Rio from Bird of Paradise in The Film Daily, 1932

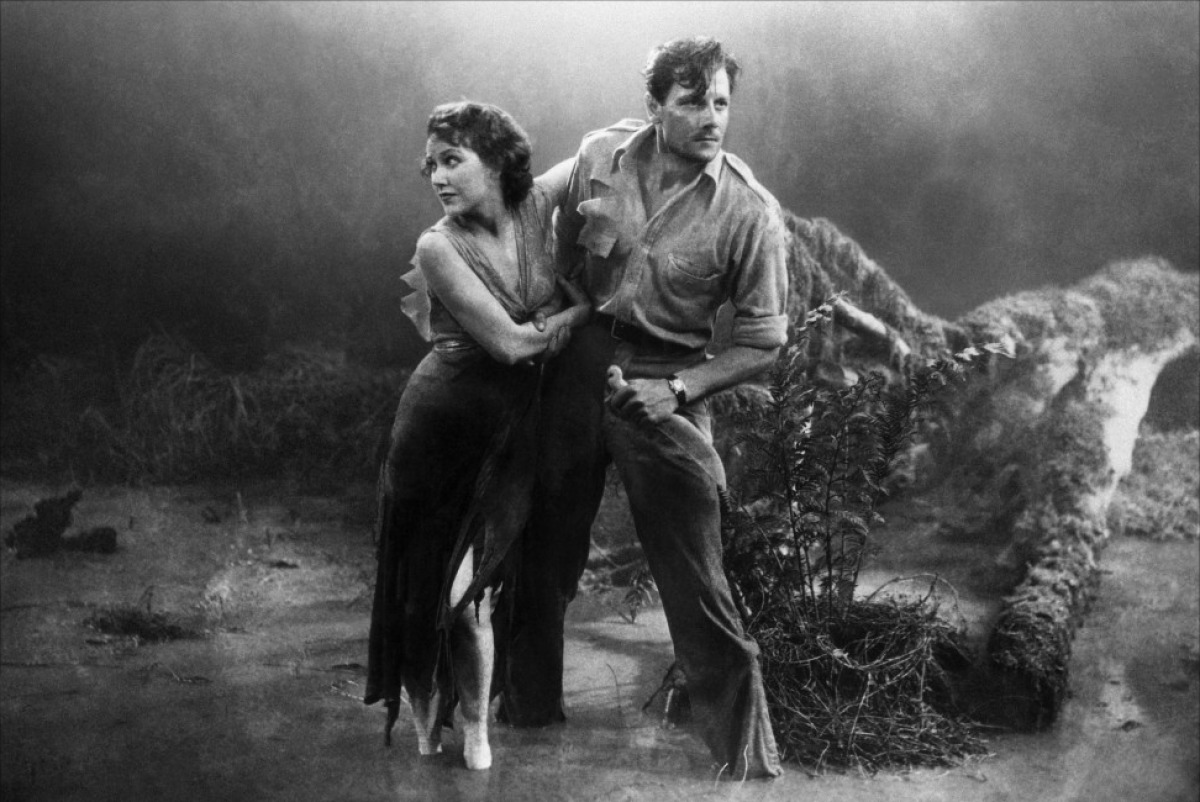
McCrea with Fay Wray in The Most Dangerous Game (1932)

In the 1930s, McCrea starred in the pre-code film Bird of Paradise (1932), directed by King Vidor, co-starring with Dolores del Río. In RKO's The Sport Parade (1932), McCrea and William Gargan are friends on the Dartmouth football team, who are shown snapping towels at each other in the locker room, while other players are taking a shower. In 1932 he starred with Fay Wray in The Most Dangerous Game – which used some of the same jungle sets built for King Kong (1933) as well as cast members Wray and Robert Armstrong, and was filmed at night while King Kong was filmed during the day. He was originally intended for the character Jack Driscoll in King Kong, but he turned down the role which subsequently went to Bruce Cabot.

In 1934 he made his first appearances with two leading ladies he would be paired with often, Miriam Hopkins in The Richest Girl in the World, the first of their five films together, and Barbara Stanwyck in Gambling Lady, the first of their six pairings.

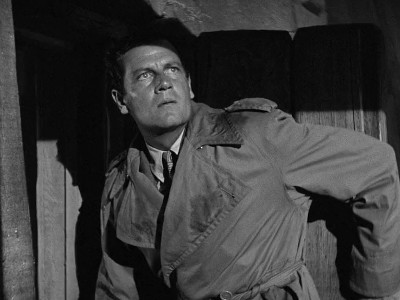
McCrea in Alfred Hitchcock's Foreign Correspondent (1940)

Later in the decade he was the first actor to play "Dr. Kildare", in the film Internes Can't Take Money (1937), and starred in two large-scale Westerns, Wells Fargo (1937) with his wife Frances Dee, and Cecil B. DeMille's Union Pacific (1939).

McCrea reached the peak of his early career in the early 1940s, in Alfred Hitchcock's thriller Foreign Correspondent (1940), a romantic comedy, The More the Merrier (1943), directed by George Stevens, and two comedies by Preston Sturges: Sullivan's Travels (1941) and The Palm Beach Story (1942).

McCrea turned down playing in a number of films; he was offered the lead role in The Postman Always Rings Twice (1946) but he refused, saying "This character is too much of a gigolo. I don't like his moral standards." Among other movies he declined were Spitfire (1934), The Impatient Years (1944), Intruder in the Dust (1949), and The Story of Will Rogers (1952). During World War II, McCrea refused to portray military heroes, with the explanation, "Since I was too old to be called, I was too old for that kind of a show". He was also notoriously modest about his acting abilities, and would say that he didn't feel good enough to play certain parts. He also preferred playing roles that he could see himself in. Despite his own opinion of his acting, Katharine Hepburn reportedly felt that he was one of the best actors with whom she had worked. She believed McCrea should have been ranked alongside Spencer Tracy or Humphrey Bogart.

McCrea with Veronica Lake in the trailer of Preston Sturges's Sullivan's Travels (1941)

McCrea also starred in two William A. Wellman Westerns, The Great Man's Lady (1942), again with Stanwyck, and Buffalo Bill (1944), with character actor Edgar Buchanan and a young Maureen O'Hara. After the success of the film The Virginian in 1946, McCrea made Westerns exclusively for the rest of his career, with two exceptions: an uncredited role in the 1951 film noir Hollywood Story and the British-made Rough Shoot (1953).

By that time the multi-millionaire McCrea had long been working his own ranch in Ventura County outside of L.A.. Specializing in Westerns was not merely a return to what he had done earlier in his career, but a genre he immensely enjoyed. As he described it (in a 1978 interview):

I liked doing comedies, but as I got older I was better suited to do Westerns. Because I think it becomes unattractive for an older fellow trying to look young, falling in love with attractive girls in those kinds of situations.... Anyway, I always felt so much more comfortable in the Western. The minute I got a horse and a hat and a pair of boots on, I felt easier. I didn't feel like I was an actor anymore. I felt like I was the guy out there doing it.

On November 19, 1950, McCrea appeared on Television Theatre in an adaptation of Foreign Correspondent. In the early 1950s, McCrea starred as Jace Pearson on the radio series Western, Tales of the Texas Rangers. In 1955 he was Wyatt Earp in Wichita directed by Jacques Tourneur. The Hollywood Foreign Press Association awarded the film with "Best Picture – Outdoor Drama" that year.

In 1959, McCrea and his son Jody starred in the brief NBC-TV series Wichita Town. Earlier he had turned down the lead in Rawhide, feeling it would make too heavy a workload. A few years later, McCrea united with fellow veteran of Westerns Randolph Scott in Ride the High Country (1962), directed by Sam Peckinpah, after which he did not make another feature film until The Young Rounders (1966). Four more years were to pass before his next film, but 1970 saw the release of two: Cry Blood, Apache, again with his son Jody, and Sioux Nation. He made his final film appearance in 1976, in Mustang Country.

== Personal life ==
McCrea married actress Frances Dee in Rye, New York, on October 20, 1933, after they met while filming The Silver Cord. Coincidentally, Dee was born only a few blocks away from McCrea's home, but she moved to Chicago during her childhood. They had three sons, Jody, Peter and David. They were married until McCrea's death on their 57th wedding anniversary.

McCrea – who was an outdoorsman who had once listed his occupation as "rancher" and his hobby as "acting" – had begun buying property as early as 1933, when he purchased his first 1,000 acres (400 ha) in an unincorporated area of eastern Ventura County, California, which later incorporated into Thousand Oaks. This was the beginning of what evolved into a 3,000-acre (1,200 ha) spread where McCrea and his wife lived, raised their sons, and rode their horses. At one point, McCrea's ranch produced 200,000 pounds of beef every year. He was noted for being a hard worker on his ranch; he was very active in the management, including riding, roping and branding.

By the end of the 1940s, McCrea was a multi-millionaire, as much from his real-estate dealings as from his movie stardom. It is said that McCrea once joked that he "only acted so he could afford to ranch". In the early 1960s, he sold 1,200 acres (490 ha) of land to an oil company on the condition that they would not drill within sight of his home. McCrea's perspicacity may have stemmed from his friendship in the 1930s with fellow personality and sometime actor Will Rogers. McCrea recounted that "the Oklahoma Sage" gave him a profound piece of advice: "Save half of what you make, and live on just the other half."

McCrea supported Thomas Dewey in the 1944 United States presidential election, Barry Goldwater in the 1964 United States presidential election, and Ronald Reagan in the 1966 California gubernatorial election.

In a story originally published in 1954, McCrea said he was a man of faith, who relied on the guidance of God in his personal life and career, saying that through the years he followed the principle of "asking my way of Him." At the end of the article, McCrea added, "I don't claim I haven't made mistakes. I have. But most of my mistakes were due to trusting 'luck' or my own judgment instead of His."

=== Death ===
McCrea made his final public appearance on October 3, 1990, at a fundraiser for Republican gubernatorial candidate Pete Wilson in Beverly Hills. He died less than three weeks later on October 20, at the Motion Picture & Television Country House and Hospital in Woodland Hills, Los Angeles, California, from pneumonia at the age of 84.

After his death his family ultimately donated thirty-five acres (14 ha) of McCrea's former ranch to the newly formed Conejo Valley YMCA for the city of Thousand Oaks. They also donated 75 acres (30 ha) to the Conejo Open Space Conservancy Agency (COSCA), which designated it the Joel McCrea Wildlife Preserve; and five acres (2.0 ha) to the Boys and Girls Club of Camarillo.

== Partial filmography ==
- Torrent (1926, stunts)
- The Fair Co-Ed (1927) as Student (uncredited)
- The Enemy (1927) as Extra (uncredited)
- The Five O'Clock Girl (1928) as Oswald
- Dead Man's Curve (1928) (uncredited)
- Freedom of the Press (1928) (uncredited)
- The Jazz Age (1929) as Todd Sayles
- The Divine Lady (1929) as Extra (uncredited)
- The Single Standard (1929) as Blythe – One of the Philandering Men (uncredited)
- So This Is College (1929) as Bruce Nolan (uncredited)
- Dynamite (1929) as Marco – Her Boy Friend
- Framed (1930) as Waiter at the Casino Club (uncredited)
- The Silver Horde (1930) as Boyd Emerson
- Lightnin' (1930) as John Marvin
- Once a Sinner (1931) as Tommy Mason
- Kept Husbands (1931) as Richard 'Dick' Brunton
- Born to Love (1931) as Barry Craig
- The Common Law (1931) as John Neville
- Girls About Town (1931) as Jim Baker
- Business and Pleasure (1932) as Lawrence Ogle
- The Lost Squadron (1932) as Red
- Bird of Paradise (1932) as Johnny Baker
- The Most Dangerous Game (1932) as Bob Rainsford
- The Sport Parade (1932) as Sandy Brown
- Rockabye (1932) as Jacobs Van Riker Pell
- Scarlet River (1933) as Joel McCrea (uncredited)
- The Silver Cord (1933) as David Phelps
- Bed of Roses (1933) as Dan
- One Man's Journey (1933) as Jimmy Watt
- Chance at Heaven (1933) as Blacky Gorman
- Gambling Lady (1934) as Garry Madison
- Half a Sinner (1934) as John Adams
- The Richest Girl in the World (1934) as Tony
- Private Worlds (1935) as Dr. Alex MacGregor
- Our Little Girl (1935) as Dr. Donald Middleton
- Woman Wanted (1935) as Tony Baxter
- Barbary Coast (1935) as Jim Carmichael
- Splendor (1935) as Brighton Lorrimore
- These Three (1936) as Dr. Joseph Cardin
- Two in a Crowd (1936) as Larry Stevens
- Adventure in Manhattan (1936) as George Melville
- Come and Get It (1936) as Richard Glasgow
- Banjo on My Knee (1936) as Ernie Holley
- Internes Can't Take Money (1937) as James Kildare
- Woman Chases Man (1937) as Kenneth Nolan
- Dead End (1937) as Dave
- Wells Fargo (1937) as Ramsay MacKay
- Three Blind Mice (1938) as Van Dam Smith
- Youth Takes a Fling (1938) as Joe Meadows
- Union Pacific (1939) as Jeff Butler
- They Shall Have Music (1939) as Peter
- Espionage Agent (1939) as Barry Corvall
- He Married His Wife (1940) as T.H. Randall
- Primrose Path (1940) as Ed Wallace
- Foreign Correspondent (1940) as John Jones
- Reaching for the Sun (1941) as Russ Eliot
- Sullivan's Travels (1941) as film director John L. Sullivan (a play on the boxer of the same name).
- The Great Man's Lady (1942) as Ethan Hoyt
- The Palm Beach Story (1942) as Tom Jeffers
- The More the Merrier (1943) as Joe Carter
- Buffalo Bill (1944) as William Frederick 'Buffalo Bill' Cody
- The Great Moment (1944) as William Thomas Green Morton
- The Unseen (1945) as David Fielding
- The Virginian (1946) as The Virginian
- Ramrod (1947) as Dave Nash
- Four Faces West (1948) as Ross McEwen
- South of St. Louis (1949) as Kip Davis
- Colorado Territory (1949) as Wes McQueen
- The Outriders (1950) as Will Owen
- Stars in My Crown (1950) as Josiah Doziah Gray
- Saddle Tramp (1950) as Chuck Conner
- Frenchie (1950) as Sheriff Tom Banning
- Hollywood Story (1951) as Joel McCrea
- Cattle Drive (1951) as Dan Mathews
- The San Francisco Story (1952) as Rick Nelson
- The Lone Hand (1953) as Zachary Hallock
- Rough Shoot (1953) as Taine
- Border River (1954) as Clete Mattson
- Black Horse Canyon (1954) as Del Rockwell
- Stranger on Horseback (1955) as Judge Richard 'Rick' Thorne
- Wichita (1955) as Wyatt Earp
- The First Texan (1956) as Sam Houston
- The Oklahoman (1957) as Dr. John M. Brighton
- Trooper Hook (1957) as Sgt. Clovis Hook
- Gunsight Ridge (1957) as Mike Ryan
- The Tall Stranger (1957) as Ned Bannon
- Cattle Empire (1958) as John Cord
- Fort Massacre (1958) as Sgt. Vinson
- The Gunfight at Dodge City (1959) as Bat Masterson
- The Crowning Experience (1960) as Prologue narrator
- Ride the High Country (1962) as Steve Judd
- The Young Rounders (1966)
- Cry Blood, Apache (1970) as Pitcalin as an Older Man
- Sioux Nation (1970)
- Mustang Country (1976) as Dan (final film role)

== Radio appearances ==
- Forsaking All Others - with Bette Davis in 1938.
- This Is Hollywood – "Along Came Jones" (1946)
- Tales of the Texas Rangers - 1950 to 1952

== Awards and nominations ==
In 1968, McCrea received a career achievement award from the Los Angeles Film Critics Association, and the following year he was inducted into the Hall of Great Western Performers at the National Cowboy & Western Heritage Museum in Oklahoma City, Oklahoma.

For his contribution to the motion picture industry, McCrea has a star on the Hollywood Walk of Fame at 6901 Hollywood Blvd. and another star at 6241 Hollywood Blvd. for his contribution to radio.

He was also a winner of the Golden Boot Award in 1987, the Golden Laurel Award in 1951, a Photoplay Award in 1939 for his performance in Union Pacific, the Telluride Film Festival Silver Medallion in 1982, and the Trustees Award in 1976 for the film, Mustang Country.
