= The Glory Stompers =

1967 film

- Directed by: Anthony M. Lanza
- Written by: James Gordon White; John Lawrence
- Produced by: John Lawrence executive Maurice Smith
- Starring: Dennis Hopper; Jody McCrea; Chris Noel; Jock Mahoney
- Cinematography: Mario Tosi
- Edited by: Len Miller
- Music by: Mike Curb
- Distributed by: American International Pictures (US)
- Release date: 1967
- Running time: 85 minutes
- Country: USA
- Language: English

The Glory Stompers is a 1967 outlaw biker film.

== Plot ==
After a standoff between two biker gangs in California, members of the Black Souls, led by the vicious and unstable Chino (Dennis Hopper) ambush Darryl (Jody McCrea), leader of the Glory Stompers, and beat him severely. Thinking that they have killed Darryl, the Black Souls kidnap his girlfriend (Chris Noel) to prevent her from becoming a witness against them. They decide to traffic her in Mexico and head south for the border, unaware that Darryl has recovered and is in pursuit.

== Cast ==
- Dennis Hopper as Chino
- Jody McCrea as Darryl
- Chris Noel as Chris
- Jock Mahoney as "Smiley"
- Lindsay Crosby as "Monk"
- Casey Kasem as "Mouth"
- Jim Reader as Paul
- Sandra Bettin as Jo Ann (credited as Saundra Gayle)
- Robert Tessier as Magoo
- Astrid Warner as Doreen
- Gary Wood as "Pony"

== Production ==
The film was originally written by James Gordon White as a Western but was rewritten to be a biker film. It was shot in Panamint with a starting budget of $10,000. White recalled, "It’s not a great work of art, but it made a hell of a lot of money, and it got me an exclusive contract with AIP. To my knowledge I’m the only one that was under contract with American International as a writer."
