= Beach Party =

1963 film by William Asher

- Original film poster
- Directed by: William Asher
- Written by: Lou Rusoff; Uncredited: William Asher; Robert Dillon
- Produced by: James H. Nicholson; Lou Rusoff
- Starring: Bob Cummings; Dorothy Malone; Frankie Avalon; Annette Funicello; Harvey Lembeck; Jody McCrea; John Ashley; Morey Amsterdam; Eva Six; Dick Dale; The Del Tones
- Cinematography: Kay Norton
- Edited by: Homer Powell
- Music by: Les Baxter
- Production company: Alta Vista Productions
- Distributed by: American International Pictures (AIP)
- Release date: August 7, 1963 (U.S.)
- Running time: 101 minutes
- Country: United States
- Language: English
- Budget: $300,000 or $200,000
- Box office: $2,300,000 (US/Canada)

Beach Party is a 1963 American film and the first of seven beach party films from American International Pictures (AIP) aimed at a teen audience. This film is often credited with creating the beach party film genre.

== Plot ==
Frankie and Dolores are two young lovebirds heading to the beach for what Frankie assumes is a private romantic getaway. However, dissatisfied with her relationship and unwilling to be alone with Frankie, Dolores has invited several of the couple's friends to stay at the beach house with them. Frankie is intensely upset at finding other people at the beach house and feels betrayed that Dolores misled him. Meanwhile, an anthropologist, Professor Robert Orville Sutwell, is staying at the beach house next door, secretly studying the "wild mating habits" of Southern California teenagers who hang out at the beach and speak in strange surfing jargon.

Frankie, on the advice of his friends, decides to begin flirting with Ava, a Hungarian waitress at the local restaurant. Upset by his flirting, Dolores accidentally stumbles into the lap of Eric Von Zipper, the leader of the local outlaw motorcycle club, The Rats. Eric refuses to let Dolores go, despite her repeated direct demands to release her, until professor Sutwell intervenes. Eric threatens Sutwell, but Sutwell uses a secret finger technique to paralyze him, and he and Dolores escape.

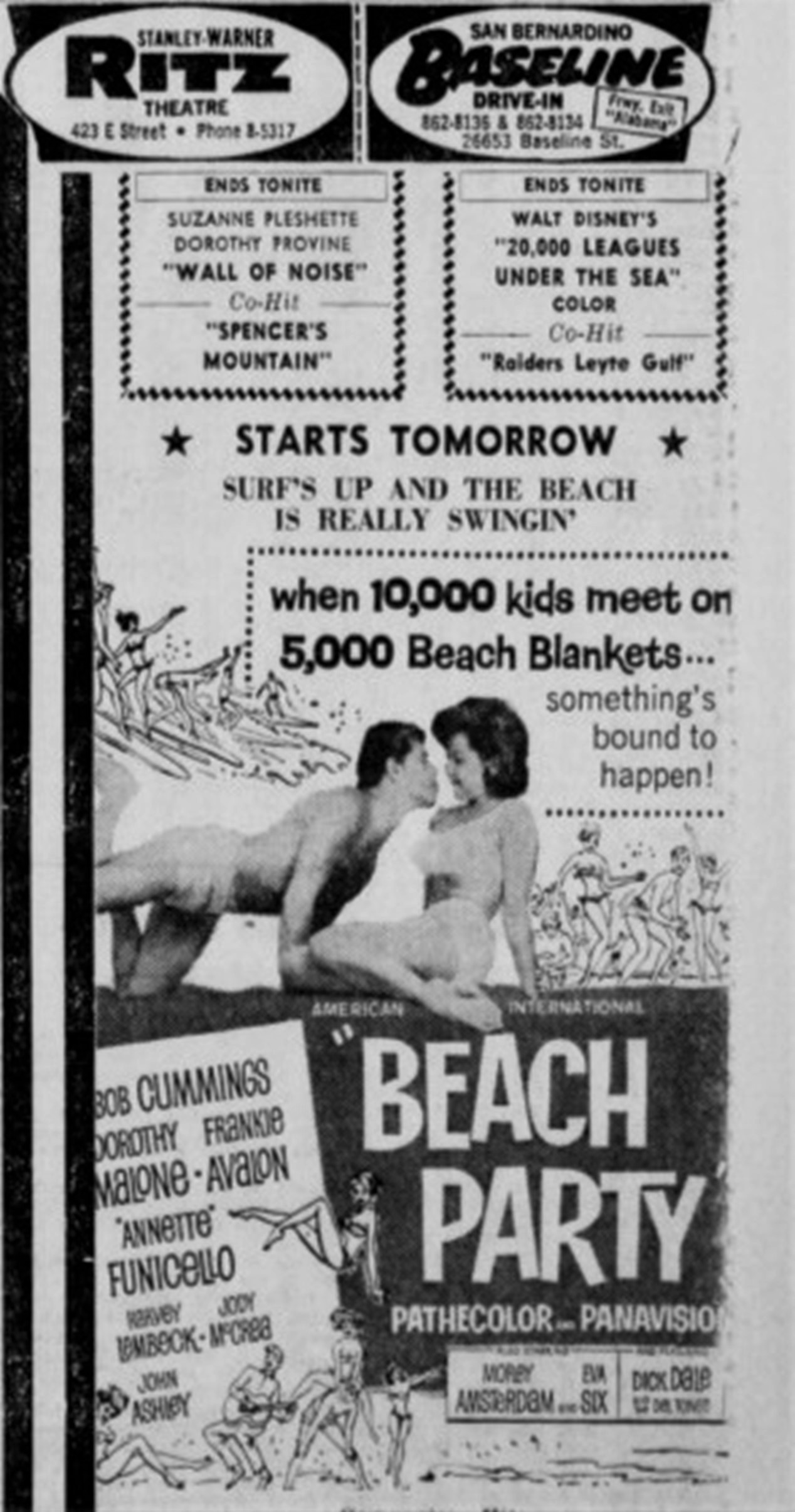
Advertisement from 1963

Dolores develops a crush on the professor. Frankie becomes jealous and escalates the flirting with Ava. Sutwell attempts to develop a professional relationship with Dolores to help him understand the culture of the young surfers; she in turn interprets his professional interest in a sexual and romantic way. Ava develops sincere feelings for Frankie, who is merely using her to make Dolores jealous. Frankie tires of the games, and decides to confess his love to Dolores, who accepts and kisses him; however, when Ava intervenes and says that Frankie also told her that he loves her, Dolores breaks things off with him. Meanwhile, Sutwell's assistant Marianne also has romantic interest in the Professor, who is oblivious to her hints.

Dolores introduces Sutwell to her friends, who tease him and mock him but also inadvertently help him learn to surf. One evening, Frankie goes off alone with Ava, but refuses her physical advances. Meanwhile, Sutwell shaves his beard off at Dolores's request in an attempt to appear younger, and once again remains oblivious to Dolores's romantic advances, instead focusing on his research. Von Zipper and his gang plot to bring down Sutwell, but accidentally sneak into Dolores's room where she is home alone. By chance, Sutwell hears Dolores screaming and again disables Von Zipper. He hugs Dolores to console her, only to be confronted by the surfing teenagers who were also running in to check on the screaming Dolores. They, like his assistant Marianne, assume that there has been sexual contact between Sutwell and Dolores.

After returning to his office, Sutwell finally realizes the feelings that Dolores has for him and realizes both that Marianne has feelings for him and that he in turn has feelings for her. He kisses Marianne just as Dolores visits him, ending Dolores's attraction to him. After Dolores storms off, heartbroken, Frankie becomes angry, and brings his friends with him to confront Sutwell. They discover Sutwell's notes that he has been taking as he studies them, and are infuriated at being the subjects of his research. Sutwell escapes to the very restaurant where Ava works, but is discovered there by Frankie, Dolores, and all the other surfers. Frankie accuses Sutwell of playing with Dolores's heart. Sutwell then declares that Dolores was only using him in the same way that Frankie was using Ava, merely as a scheme to make the other jealous. Dolores, catching on to Sutwell's ruse, agrees.

Just as a peace is being made, Eric and his biker gang enter and attack Sutwell. The surfers protect him, and a large-scale fight breaks out. After the surfers win, Sutwell offers to take Marianne with him to study in the North Pacific, and Frankie and Dolores reaffirm their love for one another.

== Cast ==
- Bob Cummings as Professor Sutwell
- Dorothy Malone as Marianne
- Frankie Avalon as Frankie
- Annette Funicello as Dolores
- Morey Amsterdam as Cappy
- Harvey Lembeck as Eric Von Zipper
- Eva Six as Ava
- John Ashley as Ken
- Jody McCrea as Deadhead
- Dick Dale as himself
- The Del Tones as themselves
- Andy Romano as J.D.
- The Ratz and The Mice:
  - Jerry Brutsche
  - Bob Harvey
  - John Macchia
  - Alberta Nelson
  - Linda Rogers
- David Landfield as Ed
- Valora Noland as Rhonda
- Bobby Pane as Tom
- Pam Colbert as Surfer
- Delores Wells as Sue
- John Fain as Surfer
- Meredith MacRae as Beach girl
- John Beach as Beach boy
- Lorie Summers as Beach girl
- Roger Bacon as Beach boy
- Luree Nicholson as Beach girl
- Mike Nader as Beach boy
- Laura Nicholson as Beach girl
- Mickey Dora as Beach boy
- Donna Russell as Surfer
- Eddie Garner as Surfer
- Candy Johnson as Dancer
- Vincent Price as Big Daddy
- Gary Usher (uncredited) as Beach Boy
- Roger Christian (uncredited) as Beach Boy
- Yvette Vickers (uncredited) as Blonde Yoga Girl
- Ashlyn Martin (uncredited) as Surfer

== Development ==
=== Scripting ===
In the summer of 1962, Samuel Arkoff and Jim Nicholson were watching films in Italy with a view to purchasing some for release in the United States. They saw one film about a middle-aged man who falls in love with a young woman who spends all her time at a beach resort. They did not like the movie but were attracted by the setting, and commissioned Lou Rusoff to write a film set at the beach. The film was announced in July 1962. It was part of AIP's policy of "mass entertainment on a frankly escapist level."

Rusoff's script was apparently more in line with AIP's traditional fare of children getting in trouble with their parents. It was shown to William Asher who agreed to make the movie if it became more of a musical comedy about teenagers having a good time and not getting in trouble. Arkoff and Nicholson agreed so Asher rewrote the script with Robert Dillon. He was asked not to take credit by Samuel Arkoff who told them that Lou Rusoff was dying of brain cancer. Asher agreed and Rusoff has sole credit; he died in June 1963. Filmink wrote "Asher is clearly the one who took then teens on the beach idea and ran with it."

=== Casting ===
Robert Cummings was top billed.

Annette Funicello was always first choice for the female lead, although Asher says they were worried because she was under contract to Walt Disney:

We had thirty pages of material. Disney had to approve it. Not having all the material, he was concerned about Annette's image. I told him that there wouldn't be anything that would offend, that it wasn't that type of a picture. They were a little wary because it was AIP.

Funicello says other producers had tried to hire her before but Disney had said no. However "something about Beach Party appealed to him," she later wrote. She says Disney told her the film was "good, clean fun" but asked her not to expose her navel.

Arkoff says that AIP tried to get Fabian Forte to play opposite her but he was under contract to 20th Century Fox so Frankie Avalon was cast instead. In July 1962 it was announced Avalon would play the lead with Funicello "probably" appearing alongside him.

Avalon had made Panic in the Year Zero for AIP and was friendly with Lou Rousoff. He says they would talk about doing a picture about young people, then Rousoff wrote Beach Party. "It was about young guys on a beach with their girls," Avalon says. "The next thing I knew, they cast this girl on loan from Disney called Annette Funicello. The director was Bill Asher. I had worked with Bill when he was doing a lot of specials for television. We talked about the project, and sooner or later we were on the set doing it. And it just worked." Filmink argued Avalon and Funicello "teamed together so well that it’s surprising that Avalon was the second choice for his role (assuming Arkoff remembered it correctly).... Avalon had a brighter, high-energy cartoon-ish vibe more suitable to Beach Party. I like Fabian, but don’t think that the film would have been as successful with him in it.

John Ashley had made a number of movies for American International and was cast to play Avalon's best friend.

== Production ==
The film was shot over three weeks starting in March 1963. Locations included Newport, Balboa, Laguna and Malibu Beach.

"We were constantly filming," says Avalon. "We were doing 28 setups a day. I would say to Bill Asher ... 'I don't think my character Frankie would say this.' And he'd say, 'What are you talking about? Just say the line. Let's have fun with it.'"

John Ashley later recalled:

We all had to wear body make up because nobody had a tan. One day Frankie and I had some dialogue to do on our way to the water with our surfboards. It was colder than hell that day and the water was freezing. We had our backs to the camera and Frankie said, "Man, can you believe us? Two thirty year old guys in body make up playing teenagers."

Funicello says she had constant pressure during the film to show her navel. She refused and later argued she felt audiences responded positively to her character because they could sense her determination.

Although Mickey Dora was Bob Cummings' stunt surfer for long-shots, Cummings was already a competent surfer himself by the time he starred in Beach Party as the ungainly Professor. Films of him surfing in Hawaii on the Ken Murray's Hollywood television show feature a muscular young Bob cruising along comfortably on an old style long board.

William Asher had directed Robert Cummings earlier in his career but says during Beach Party he noticed the actor "had changed". Asher attributed this later to Cummings' addiction to methamphetamine (although he was unaware of this during the shoot.)

In one of the first instances of film cross-selling, AIP took advantage of the target demographic of this film to promote another in a different genre, when at the very end of the credits – after giving "A Special thanks" to Vincent Price for appearing as Big Daddy – the title reads "Soon to be seen in Edgar Allan Poe's Haunted Palace", an AIP horror film that would be released on August 28, 1963 – just weeks after the release of Beach Party. Price's line, "The Pit… Bring me my pendulum, kiddies, I feel like swinging…", is a jocular reference to AIP's 1961 Price vehicle, The Pit and the Pendulum, directed by Roger Corman.

== Music ==
The music in Beach Party was written specifically for the film and directed by Kaylen Mandry and featured a score that picked up several cues from the songs used – a common move for most musicals, but a rarity for a B-grade studio teen film filled with pop songs – even today. Les Baxter composed this score, as well as most of the films that followed, including Sergeant Deadhead, Dr. Goldfoot and the Bikini Machine and Fireball 500.

Gary Usher and Roger Christian wrote three songs that appear in the film: the title track, performed by Avalon and Funicello; and "Swingin' and a-Surfin'" and "Secret Surfing Spot", both performed by Dick Dale and the Del Tones.

Bob Marcucci and Russ Faith wrote "Don't Stop Now", performed by Avalon.

Guy Hemric and Jerry Styner wrote two songs for Funicello featured in the film: "Treat Him Nicely", which Funicello performs while harmonizing with herself; and "Promise Me Anything (But Give Me Love)" performed off-screen and presented as source music.

=== Songs ===
- "Beach Party Tonight" – Frankie Avalon and Annette Funicello
- "Secret Surfin' Spot" – Dick Dale
- "Swingin' and Surfin'" – Dick Dale
- "Don't Stop Now" – Frankie Avalon
- "Treat Him Nicely" – Annette Funicello
- "Promise Me Anything (But Give Me Love)" – Annette Funicello

== Cultural references ==
The Rat Pack motorcycle gang is largely a parody of The Wild One (1953); Harvey Lembeck's "Eric Von Zipper" spoofs Marlon Brando's performance as the leader of the gang; however, unlike the Brando character he is generally clumsy and inept.

Big Daddy's club in this film (and Cappy's Place in Muscle Beach Party) is a reference to Southern California beach coffeehouses in general and Cafe Frankenstein in particular.

== Reception ==
=== Box office ===
Beach Party was the highest-grossing film AIP had made to that date, earning more during its opening weekend than any of its competition.

The film earned an estimated $1.2 million by the end of 1963. Nicholson told Variety he estimated the film would gross between $3-4 million for a cost under $800,000, double any previous AIP film.

=== Critical ===
Howard Thompson of The New York Times wrote "The real trouble is that almost the entire cast emerges as the dullest bunch ever, with the old folks even sillier than the kids—a nice looking lot, too. We suspect that the youngsters in the audience may find it all pretty laughable."

Variety described the film as "a bouncy bit of lightweight fluff" with "the kind of direct, simple-minded cheeriness which should prove well nigh irresistible to those teenagers who have no desire to escape the emptiness of their lives."

Philip K. Scheuer of the Los Angeles Times called it "a rather harmless little effort, really, which may amuse the stomp set which it is about, while the older folks do a sit-along that isn't too painful."

The Monthly Film Bulletin wrote "Bob Cummings and Dorothy Malone, in particular, underplay with a nice relaxed edge, and the teenagers are slightly less awful than usual. But perhaps the film's main virtue lies in its friendly, lightly satirical tone; there is no heavy moralising, the potential violence of Eric von Zipper's gang is turned into farce (rather messy, this, with an over-abundance of custard pies) and the pop numbers are pleasantly handled."

The Golden Laurel, which had no ceremony but published its award results in the trade magazine Motion Picture Exhibitor from 1958 to 1971, gave this film The Golden Laurel for Sleeper of the Year in 1964.

Funicello says this film was her personal favorite of the series.

== Cultural impact ==
With this film, AIP created a new subgenre – the beach party film. Several other studios attempted to imitate the AIP Beach Party formula, but never with equal success. Films of the genre include: Surf Party, Ride the Wild Surf, and For Those Who Think Young (all from 1964), A Swingin' Summer and Beach Ball (both 1965), Catalina Caper and It's a Bikini World (from 1967).

The 1996 film That Thing You Do! features a parody of 1960s beach movies. In the film, the fictional singing group called The Wonders star as "Cap'n Geech and The Shrimpshack Shooters." The movie within the movie is titled Weekend at Party Pier and features characters similar to those played by Frankie Avalon and Annette Funicello.

William Asher later said that "the key to these pictures is lots of flesh but no sex. It's all good clean fun. No hearts are broken and virginity prevails."

== Films in the series ==
Many of the same cast – and much of the same crew – were involved in the AIP films that followed. Sometimes character names changed (like in Pajama Party, Ski Party and Sergeant Deadhead), and not all were beach-based (Ski Party in the mountains, Ghost in the Invisible Bikini in a haunted house), but the basic elements and tone remained the same:

- Beach Party (1963)
- Muscle Beach Party (1964)
- Bikini Beach (1964)
- Pajama Party (1964)
- Beach Blanket Bingo (1965)
- Ski Party (1965)
- How to Stuff a Wild Bikini (1965)
- Sergeant Deadhead (1965)*
- Dr. Goldfoot and the Bikini Machine (1965)
- The Ghost in the Invisible Bikini (1966)*
- Fireball 500 (1966)
- Thunder Alley (1967)*

* Avalon appeared in every film except The Ghost in the Invisible Bikini, and Thunder Alley. Funicello appeared in every film except Sergeant Deadhead and The Ghost in the Invisible Bikini. Filmink wrote "Avalon’s warm persona and slightly cartoonish vibe were ideal for the beach party movies, with their in-jokes, double-takes, songs and silliness."

In 1987, Avalon and Funicello starred in the sequel/parody film Back to the Beach.

At one point there was talk of a Beach Party TV series but this never came about.

== See also ==
- List of American films of 1963

== Bibliography ==
- Arkoff, Sam (1992). Flying through Hollywood by the Seat of My Pants: From the Man Who Brought You I Was a Teenage Werewolf and Muscle Beach Party. Birch Lane Press. ISBN 1-55972-107-3.
- Betrock, Alan (1986). The I Was a Teenage Juvenile Delinquent Rock 'n' Roll Horror Beach Party Movie Book – A Complete Guide to the Teen Exploitation Film: 1954–1969. New York: St. Martin's Press. pp. 100–105. ISBN 0-312-40293-7.
- Burns, Walter (Fall 2003). "Song of the Beach: AIP is the Studio Responsible for the Only Successful Musical Series Ever Made in Hollywood". Cinema Editor. 53: 46–51.
- Chidester, Brian & Priore, Domenic (2008). Pop Surf Culture: Music, Design, Film, and Fashion from the Bohemian Surf Boom. Santa Monica: Santa Monica Press. pp. 198–203. ISBN 978-1-59580-035-0.
- Funicello, Annette; Bashe, Patricia Romanowski (1994). A dream is a wish your heart makes: my story. Hyperion.
- Mars, Mikey. "The Music of the Beach Party Movies". Archived from the original on April 26, 2010.
- McParland, Stephen J. (1994). It's Party Time: A Musical Appreciation of the Beach Party Film Genre. Riverside, California, USA: PTB Productions. ISBN 0-9601880-2-9.
- Warshaw, Matt, ed. (2003). "Hollywood and Surfing". The Encyclopedia of Surfing. Harcourt, Inc. pp. 270–271. ISBN 0-15-100579-6.
