= James Gordon White =

American screenwriter

James Gordon White was a screenwriter best known for his work in the exploitation field.

== Select Credits ==
- The Glory Stompers (1967)
- The Hellcats (1968)
- The Mini-Skirt Mob (1968)
- The Young Animals (1968)
- The Devil's 8 (1969)
- Hell's Belles (1969)
- Scream Free! (1969)
- Bigfoot (1970)
- The Incredible 2-Headed Transplant (1971)
- The Tormentors (1971)
- The Thing with Two Heads (1972)
- Ten Violent Women (1982)
