= Wichita Town =

- Original title card for the series
- Starring: Joel McCrea; Jody McCrea; Carlos Romero; George Neise; Robert Foulk; Robert Anderson
- Country of origin: United States
- No. of seasons: 1
- No. of episodes: 26

Production
- Running time: 30 minutes

Original release
- Network: NBC
- Release: September 30, 1959 – April 6, 1960

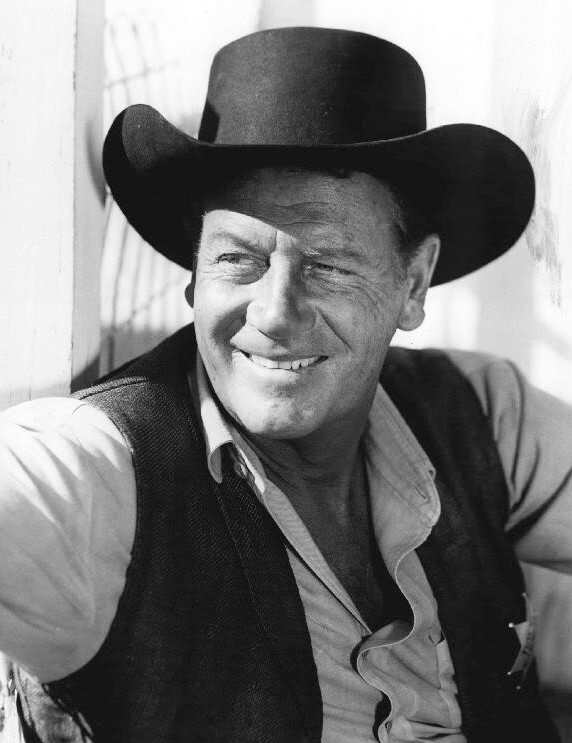
Joel McCrea as Mike Dunbar

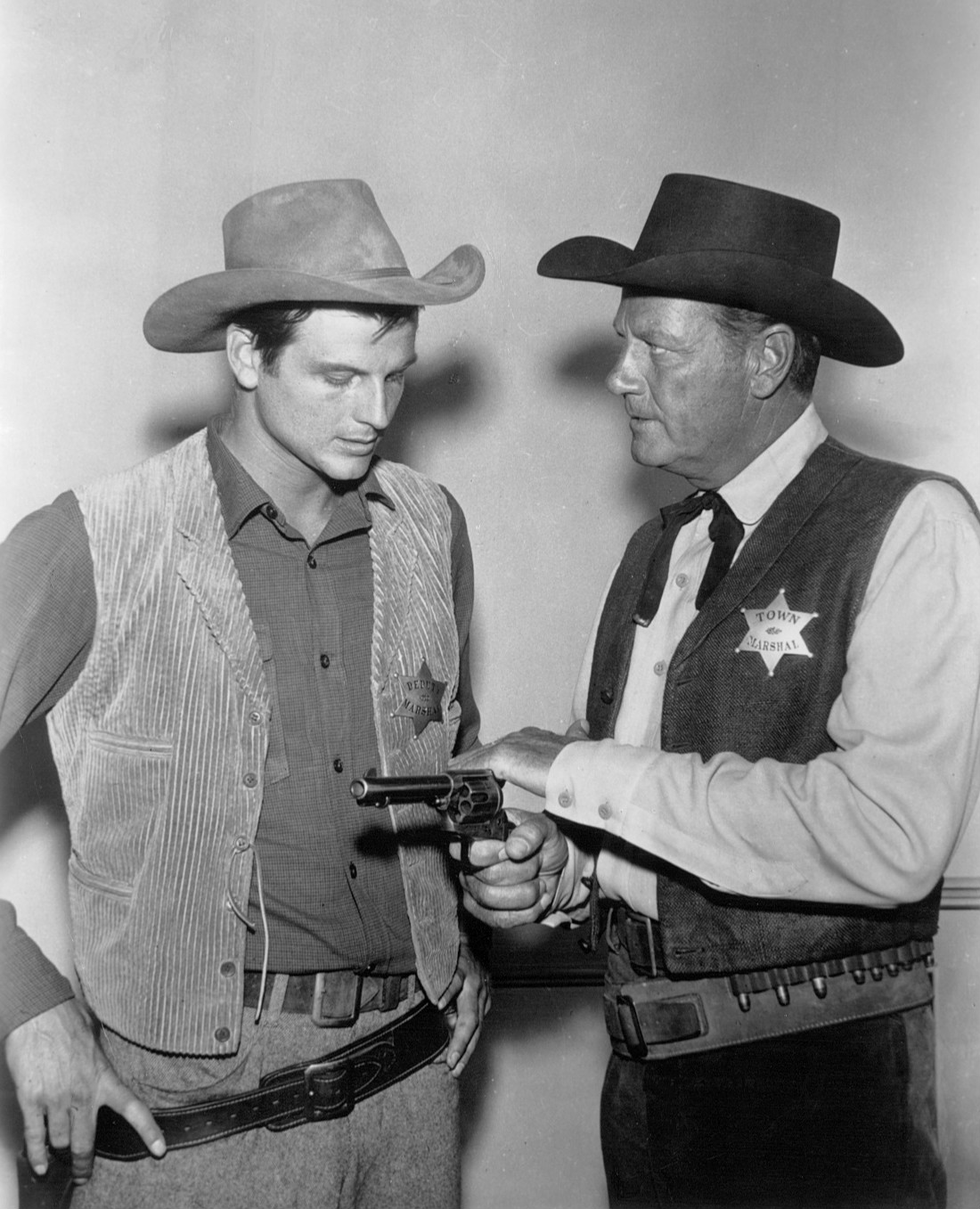
Jody McCrea and Joel McCrea in Wichita Town (1959)

Wichita Town is a half-hour Western television series starring Joel McCrea, Jody McCrea, Carlos Romero, and George Neise that aired on NBC from September 30, 1959, until September 23, 1960.

Joel McCrea played Marshal Mike Dunbar, in charge of keeping the peace in the booming cattle town of Wichita, Kansas. His deputies were Ben Matheson, played by McCrea's real life son, Jody, and Rico Rodriquez, portrayed by Carlos Romero. Making occasional appearances were the town doctor, Nat Wyndham (played by George Neise), the blacksmith, Aeneas MacLinahan (played by Robert Anderson), and the bartender in the local saloon, Joe Kingston, played in six episodes by Robert Foulk.

The model for shows such as these had already been laid out by other Westerns such as Gunsmoke, Lawman, and The Life and Legend of Wyatt Earp, so Wichita Town may not have been unique in its plotting and structure. The two most unusual features about the series were the presence of Joel McCrea, a favorite of Western film audiences for his performance in such films as Union Pacific, Buffalo Bill, and Ramrod, and the fact that his real life son was in Wichita Town, but did not play his son. Wichita Town was produced by Mirisch Company and Joel McCrea's Production company for Four Star Television and aired for a single season.

== Guest stars ==
- Richard Coogan, formerly of NBC's The Californians, was cast as the Reverend Nichols in "The Devil's Choice" (1959).
- Ben Cooper, as Tom Warren in "Passage to the Enemy"
- Dennis Cross, as Fred Keever in "Second Chance" (1960)
- Gene Evans, earlier of My Friend Flicka, as Otis Stockert in "The Frontiersman" (1960)
- Yvonne Lime Fedderson, as Fran in "Biggest Man in Town" (1959)
- Frank Ferguson, as Mayor Eric Holbein in "The Night the Cowboys Roared" (1959) and "The Frontiersman (1960)
- Jock Gaynor's first acting appearance was as Joe Malone in Wichita Town. Later that year he landed a supporting role on another NBC Western, Outlaws.
- Ron Hagerthy, formerly of Sky King, as Tod in "Biggest Man in Town" (1959)
- Ron Hayes, as Scotty in the episode "Sidekicks"
- I. Stanford Jolley, as Smokey, and John McIntire, as Frank Matheson prior to his Chris Hale starring role in Wagon Train, were cast together in the episode "Paid in Full".
- Keith Larsen, star of NBC's Northwest Passage, appeared on Wichita Town in the role of the Indian, Blue Raven, in "Seed of Hate" (1960).
- Nan Leslie, formerly of NBC's The Californians, cast on Wichita Town as Margaret Cook in "Day of Battle" (1959)
- Suzanne Lloyd, as Laura in "Afternoon in Town" and "Sidekicks" (1960)
- Mort Mills, as Pete Bennett in "Man on the Hill" (1959)
- John M. Pickard, formerly of Boots and Saddles, appeared twice in episodes "Wyndham's Way" and as a character named Bain in the episode "Second Chance".
- Robert F. Simon, as Walt McCloud in "Second Chance"

== Episodes ==
No.	Title	Original release date
0	"The Night the Cowboys Roared"	September 30, 1959
1	"Wyndham's Way"	October 7, 1959
2	"Afternoon in Town"	February 17, 1960
3	"Bullet for a Friend"	October 14, 1959
4	"Passage to the Enemy"	December 2, 1959
5	"Bought"	January 13, 1960
6	"Drifting"	October 28, 1959
7	"They Won't Hang Jimmy Relson"	October 21, 1959
8	"Compadre"	November 25, 1959
9	"Biggest Man in Town"	December 30, 1959
10	"Death Watch"	December 16, 1959
11	"Ruby Dawes"	January 6, 1960
12	"Man on the Hill"	November 4, 1959
13	"Day of Battle"	November 18, 1959
14	"Brothers of the Knife"	February 10, 1960
15	"Out of the Past"	December 9, 1959
16	"The Devil's Choice"	December 23, 1959
17	"Sidekicks"	April 6, 1960
18	"Seed of Hate"	January 27, 1960
19	"The Big Bang Theory"	Unaired
20	"The Frontiersman"	March 2, 1960
21	"The Avengers"	February 3, 1960
22	"The Long Night"	January 20, 1960
23	"Second Chance"	March 16, 1960
24	"The Hanging Judge"	March 9, 1960
25	"Paid in Full"	March 23, 1960
26	"The Legend of Tom Horn"	March 30, 1960
