= Wichita (1955 film) =

1955 film by Jacques Tourneur

- Directed by: Jacques Tourneur
- Screenplay by: Daniel B. Ullman
- Story by: Daniel B. Ullman
- Produced by: Walter Mirisch; Victor Heerman
- Starring: Joel McCrea
- Cinematography: Harold Lipstein
- Edited by: William Austin
- Music by: Hans J. Salter
- Color process: Technicolor
- Production company: Allied Artists Pictures
- Distributed by: Allied Artists Pictures
- Release date: July 3, 1955
- Running time: 81 minutes
- Country: United States
- Language: English
- Box office: $2.4 million (US)

Wichita is a 1955 American CinemaScope Western film directed by Jacques Tourneur and starring Joel McCrea as Wyatt Earp. The film won a Golden Globe Award for Best Outdoor Drama. The supporting cast features Vera Miles, Lloyd Bridges, Edgar Buchanan, Peter Graves, Jack Elam and Mae Clarke. The film's premiere was held in Wichita, Kansas, at The Wichita Theatre, 310 East Douglas, with the stars in attendance. Vera Miles had been Miss Kansas in 1948 and was third runner up in the Miss America pageant. The Hollywood Foreign Press Association awarded the film with "Best Picture - Outdoor Drama" in 1955.

It was mostly filmed in California, including in Thousand Oaks, CA.

== Plot ==
Former bison hunter and entrepreneur Wyatt Earp arrives in the lawless cattle town of Wichita, Kansas. His skills as a gunfighter make him a perfect candidate for marshal but he refuses the job until he feels morally obligated to bring law and order to this wild town. His least popular move is to take away the guns of everyone in town, no matter how important. Only when town banker Sam McCoy is hit with a personal tragedy does Earp's no-guns edict begin to make sense.

== Cast ==
- Joel McCrea as Wyatt Earp
- Vera Miles as Laurie McCoy
- Lloyd Bridges as Gyp Clements
- Wallace Ford as Arthur Whiteside
- Edgar Buchanan as Doc Black
- Peter Graves as Morgan Earp
- Keith Larsen as Bat Masterson
- Carl Benton Reid as Mayor Andrew Hoke
- John Smith as Jim Earp
- Walter Coy as Sam McCoy
- Robert J. Wilke as Ben Thompson (as Robert Wilke)
- Jack Elam as Al
- Mae Clarke as Mrs. McCoy
- Walter Sande as Clint Wallace

== See also ==
- List of American films of 1955
