= Stuntmen's Association of Motion Pictures =

Honorary society

The Stuntmen's Association of Motion Pictures (SAMP) is an honorary society of motion picture stunt coordinators, stuntmen, and second unit directors. It was founded in 1961 by Loren Janes, who worked as a stunt double for Steve McQueen, and Richard Geary, who doubled for Robert Vaughn. Membership is by “invitation only” and applicants must be a member of the Screen Actors Guild. It is an exclusively male group, which has named a number of honorary stuntwomen, although they are not listed as full members on the site. Previous 'honorary' members include Lucille Ball, Barbara Stanwyck, Kathleen Nolan, Marie Windsor, Julie Andrews and Kaye Wade.
