= Grant Williams (actor) =

American actor (1931–1985)

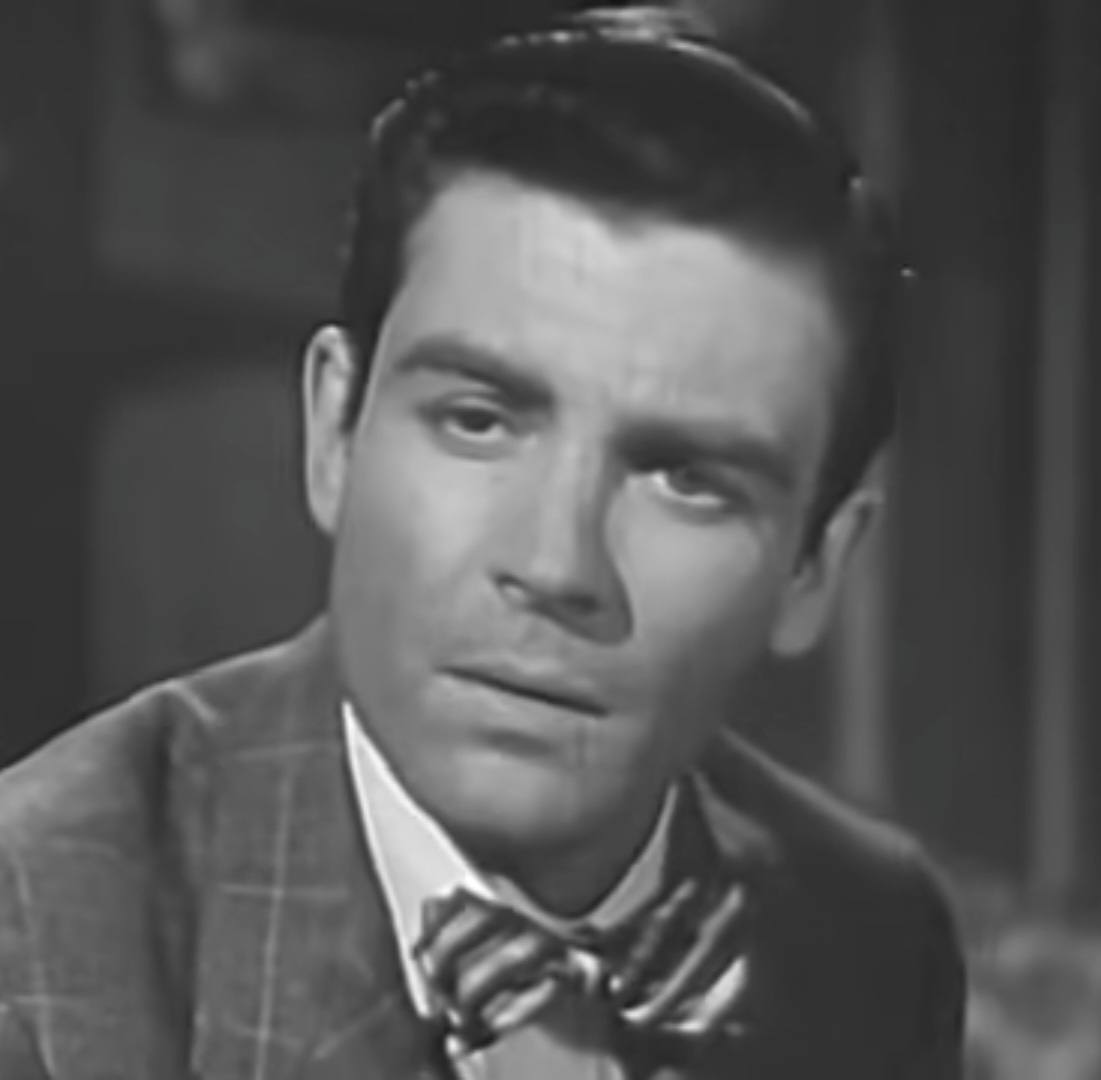
- Williams in an episode of One Step Beyond (1959)
- Born: John Joseph Williams; August 18, 1931; New York City, U.S.
- Died: July 28, 1985 (aged 53); Los Angeles, California, U.S.
- Resting place: Los Angeles National Cemetery
- Occupation: Actor
- Years active: 1953–1976
- Military career
- Branch: United States Air Force
- Service years: 1948–1952
- Rank: Staff sergeant
- Conflicts: Korean War

Grant Williams (born John Joseph Williams; August 18, 1931 – July 28, 1985) was an American film, theater, and television actor. He is best remembered for his portrayal of Scott Carey in the science fiction film The Incredible Shrinking Man (1957), and for his starring role as Greg MacKenzie on Hawaiian Eye from 1960 through 1963.

== Early life ==
Williams told United Press correspondent Ron Burton: "I've actually been a professional actor since the age of 12".

After graduating from high school, he enlisted in the U.S. Air Force, serving from September 1948 to September 1952, before and during the Korean War. He was discharged as an Air Force staff sergeant He went on to obtain a degree in journalism, from New York University according to a Dallas Morning News profile in March 1957. He earned the degree from a correspondence school according to a 1959 article.

== Career ==
=== Stage ===
After his Air Force service, he studied under Lee Strasberg.

During auditions held at the Town Hall Club in New York City in May 1953, Williams was selected for a summer scholarship at the Barter Theatre by Rosalind Russell. The "Barter Colony" at Abingdon, Virginia, is a unique training ground for actors, providing instruction in all forms of stagecraft. It was a popular choice for many recently discharged veterans, such as John Vivyan and Ernest Borgnine, who found the communal lifestyle a comfortable buffer before rejoining the civilian world. Williams spent the entire summer of 1953 there, performing in plays (see Stage performances) that on occasion starred an established professional. According to contemporaneous Barter publicity, he had at least five previous stage credits in Golden Boy, Angel Street, The Heiress, All My Sons, and The Glass Menagerie, but for which the roles and venues are not known.

Following his summer at Barter, Williams next performed in the Off-Broadway (Note: The term refers to the seating capacity of the theatre, not its location.) Blackfriars Guild Theatre. Late Arrival was staged in October 1953, wherein Williams played a suitor to the young female lead. Though he had used "Grant Williams" all throughout his Barter tenure, he was now billed as "John J. Williams". He returned to using "Grant Williams" as the lead for a summer stock production of Rope during July 1954.

=== Screen ===
Following small roles on television, Williams was spotted by a talent scout on Kraft Television Theater in 1954. He signed with Universal Pictures (U-I) in March 1955. They assigned him to Away All Boats during May 1955. Pleased with his work on that picture, U-I gave him a role as a "heavy" in Decision at Durango, later renamed Red Sundown, during July 1955. U-I then gave Williams a new contract in August, and by September 1955 he was working on Gun Shy, later released as Showdown at Abilene.

“Grant Williams was one of the best actors around. I first used him in Red Sundown (1956) in which he played a different kind of villain, effete and clean cut. He was brilliant. I used him again as the psychotic killer in Outside the Law (1956). I was so impressed with him that when it came to casting The Incredible Shrinking Man (1957) I asked for him…” —Filmmaker Jack Arnold.

His next film was the noir thriller Outside the Law (1956), followed by some small uncredited roles, and by the CinemaScope romantic comedy Four Girls in Town (1957).

Williams starred as Scott Carey in his seventh film, the Hugo Award-winning science fiction film The Incredible Shrinking Man (1957), with Randy Stuart playing his wife, Louise. Despite good reviews and the success of the film, his career continued with only lackluster roles. Universal Pictures dropped his contract in 1959, and he signed in 1960 with Warner Brothers, where he had a continuing role as the private detective Greg McKenzie on Hawaiian Eye, co-starring Robert Conrad, Anthony Eisley, and Connie Stevens.

Several film and television roles followed. In 1959 Williams played Col. Geo. Custer on the show Yancy Derringer, later that year he played a killer cowboy named "Joe Plummer" on the TV Western Gunsmoke, and the role of the psychopathic killer in Robert Bloch's The Couch (1962), but fame still eluded him. He made two guest appearances on Perry Mason, in 1964 as columnist and murderer Quincy Davis in "The Case of the Ruinous Road," and as defendant Dr. Todd Meade in the 1965 episode "The Case of the Baffling Bug."

He starred as troubled military psychologist Major Douglas McKinnon in The Outer Limits episode "The Brain of Colonel Barham" along with former Hawaiian Eye co-star Anthony Eisley. Also in 1965, Williams played the title character (Albert "Patch" Saunders) in the Bonanza episode "Patchwork Man," as well as the 1960 episode "Escape to Ponderosa."

Williams attempted a comedic role on the radio airwaves in the anthology program Family Theater (September 11, 1957, the show's last episode), and there was some light-heartedness to his delightful role as Mike Carter in the half-hour episode "Millionaire Gilbert Burton" (April 29, 1959) of the series The Millionaire. As his acting career declined, he opened a drama school in West Hollywood. Williams continued to act occasionally in both movies and television, but without much conviction and in inferior products. His last released film appearance was in Doomsday Machine (1972); however, as it was actually shot in 1967, Brain of Blood (1972) was his last acting work for the screen. His last TV appearance was in 1983 on the game show Family Feud along with other former cast members from Hawaiian Eye, who played against, and lost to the former cast members from the television series Lost In Space.

Filmmaker Jack Arnold, who directed Willams in three pictures, remarked on the trajectory of the actor's career:

The studios didn’t give him the right parts and his career never quite took off. Hollywood wanted a Robert Taylor or a Rock Hudson, not a blond guy with blue eyes. And he was a bit too pretty for character roles. Universal should have moved him up to “A” pictures, but they kept him in the “B” pictures. The same thing happened when he went to Warner Bros. He got typed—it’s happened to all of us in this business at one time or another.”

At the time of his death in 1985 he was operating an acting school in Los Angeles.

== Death ==
Williams died on July 28, 1985, aged 53, at the Los Angeles Veterans Administration Hospital, where he had been receiving treatment for blood poisoning. He was interred in Los Angeles National Cemetery. He was survived by his brother, Robert.

== Stage performances ==
Listed by year of first performance

Year	Play	Role	Venue	Notes
1953	A Streetcar Named Desire	A Young Collector	Barter Theatre	Williams' debut at the Barter, in a minor role that emphasised his youthful appearance, didn't even draw a mention from the reviewer
1953	Ten Little Indians	Anthony Marston	Barter Theatre	The reviewer noticed Williams this time, wishing he hadn't to disappear so quickly.
1953	Street Scene	Daniel Buchanen	Barter Theatre	Williams shared a group "very honorable mention"
1953	Born Yesterday	Paul Verrall	Barter Theatre	A critic said Williams' first leading role at Barter was "effective" but lacked "vocal warmth" for romance.
1953	Family Portrait	Joseph	Barter Theatre	Judith Anderson reprised her Broadway role as Mary
1953	The 13 Clocks	Tosspot	Barter Theatre	Eric Blore as the Tale-Teller was the big draw; the first Williams' interpretation of an inebriate.
1953	The Two Gentlemen of Verona	Proteus	Barter Theatre	Williams' final Barter appearance was the first US production of this play since 1899.
1953	Late Arrival	Jimmy	Blackfriars Theatre	Williams was credited as one of the "more effective" performers
1954	Rope	Wyndham Brandon	Hampton Theatre (Note: This was a summer stock venue in Westhampton Beach, New York)	Williams starred in this thriller

== Selected filmography ==
- Red Sundown (1956)
- Outside the Law (1956)
- Showdown at Abilene (1956)
- Written on the Wind (1956)
- Four Girls in Town (1957)
- The Incredible Shrinking Man (1957)
- The Monolith Monsters (1957)
- Lone Texan (1959)
- The Peter Tchaikovsky Story (1959) (TV-Movie)
- 13 Fighting Men (1960)
- The Leech Woman (1960)
- Susan Slade (1961)
- The Couch (1962) (screenplay by Robert Bloch)
- PT 109 (1963)
- Brain of Blood (1971) (last feature film)
- How's Your Love Life (1971) (shot in 1970)
- Doomsday Machine (shot in 1967, completed and released in 1972)

== Sources ==
- Reemes, Dana M. 1988. Directed by Jack Arnold. McFarland & Company, Jefferson, North Carolina 1988. ISBN 978-0899503318
