= Elizabeth Perry =

Elizabeth Perry may refer to:

- Elizabeth J. Perry (born 1948), American scholar of Chinese politics and history
- Liz Perry (born 1987), New Zealand cricketer
- Liz Cheney, also known as Elizabeth Cheney Perry, American attorney and political commentator
- Elizabeth Perry, actress in The Brain of Colonel Barham

== See also ==
- Elizabeth James-Perry (born 1973), American artist and ecologist
