= Counterweight (The Outer Limits) =

- The Outer Limits episode
- Episode no.: Season 2 Episode 14
- Directed by: Paul Stanley
- Story by: Jerry Sohl
- Teleplay by: Milton Krims
- Cinematography by: Kenneth Peach
- Production code: 36
- Original air date: December 26, 1964

Guest appearances
- Michael Constantine; Jacqueline Scott

Episode chronology
← Previous "The Duplicate Man"	Next → "The Brain of Colonel Barham"

"Counterweight" is an episode of the original The Outer Limits television show. It first aired on December 26, 1964, during the second season.

== Opening narration ==
The great unknown: Limitless heavens crowded with sparking mysteries, challenging Man's curiosity. But the heavens are not oceans. Man cannot push a boat into its currents and set sail for the next horizon. The heavens are a mystery only science can solve, as it penetrates the unknown.

== Plot ==
Four scientists, a newspaper man and a construction tycoon agree to spend 261 days in isolation in an interstellar flight simulation to planet Antheon, a world that would be a potential target for future human colonization. A "panic button" is included in case any of the subjects wants to end the simulation. However, hitting the button ends the entire simulation, and all participants will forfeit cash awards for completing the experiment. Unbeknownst to all, the experiment has been infiltrated by an extraterrestrial being, one who causes the subconscious minds of the various passengers to start manifesting outwardly: one of the passengers finds the doll of his deceased daughter on his bed, while another one is almost choked in his sleep by invisible hands. As months pass on board, relations between passengers become increasingly tense and uneasy, each one being faced with his own part of darkness. Horror eventually escalates with the plants of one passenger coming to life and destroying one another and the presence incarnating itself into one of the plants and making it grow into a huge, hideous creature. The extraterrestrial mind eventually reveals itself to the entire crew, claiming to be one of Antheon's indigenous inhabitants. The humans are accused of planning to come to Antheon with intentions of aggressive invasion and conquest, one thing the aliens cannot accept. In the end, the simulation is interrupted.

== Closing narration ==
Panic button pressed. Passengers returned. One side always in the sunlight, the other always in darkness; the known and the unknown. Frightening to each other only when they are both unknown... and misunderstood.

== Closing credits ==
Following the closing "Control Voice" narration, and before the usual closing credits, the entire cast (excluding the voice of the alien) appear in flashbacks with identifying credits. This is the only time this technique was used on The Outer Limits.

== Background ==
Based on the short story "Counterweight" by Jerry Sohl, first published in Worlds of If magazine in November 1959. The original story traces the activity of a "Nilly" or scapegoat placed aboard Weblor II, a long term space colony flight, so that the passengers will direct all their anger and frustrations toward it and not each other. It is known to the colonists as "Red Mask" and it keeps up a level of terrorism that keeps the colonists from killing each other, and when the time is ripe dying at their hands.

In the original story, this measure is employed on Weblor II due to the failure of the first flight on Weblor I and its disappearance without a trace on the second flight due to the social breakdown of the passengers and crew on a long space flight. A Nilly is a human operative among the passengers who, with the collusion of the captain and key crew members, provides the "counterweight", that is, a necessary diversion of tensions between the passengers, by committing, or seeming to commit, various acts of theft and violence, climaxing with the apprehension, trial, and fake execution of the Nilly. The term "Nilly" comes from the name Gelthorpe Nill, a former counter-espionage specialist who trained Harrel Critten, the Nilly on Weblor II.

Milton Krims's script turns the source story on its head. He introduces an actual alien presence, in place of a human scapegoat, in the form of a jagged light pattern and changes the genuine long space voyage into a simulated voyage that all the participants know from the start is only a simulation that can be terminated at any time by pressing a panic button. The alien then causes trouble between the passengers instead of diverting trouble toward itself as a scapegoat. When Joe Dix will not permit anyone to press the panic button the jagged Antheon light pattern occupies a plant specimen, turning into a human sized monster. After stating its concerns about the violent behavior of humans then giving a warning to stay away from the planet Antheon, it forces Joe Dix to hit the panic button, thus ending the "flight."

== Cast ==
- Michael Constantine – Joe Dix
- Jacqueline Scott – Dr. Alicia Hendrix
- Sandy Kenyon – Prof. Henry Craif
- Larry Ward – Keith Ellis
- Stephen Joyce – Harvey Branson
- Shary Marshall – Margaret O'Hara
- Charles H. Radilak – Michael Lint
- Crahan Denton – Matthew James
- Robert Johnson – Voice of Antheon
