= One Way Wahine =

1965 film

- Directed by: William O. Brown
- Written by: Rod Larson
- Produced by: William O. Brown
- Starring: Joy Harmon; Anthony Eisley; Edgar Bergen
- Cinematography: James Crabe
- Edited by: George White
- Music by: Jo Hanson
- Production company: Continental Pictures
- Distributed by: United Screen Arts
- Release date: September 1965
- Running time: 80 minutes
- Country: United States
- Language: English

One Way Wahine is a 1965 American comedy film produced and directed by William O. Brown and starring Joy Harmon, Anthony Eisley, the former star of Hawaiian Eye and Edgar Bergen. Set in Hawaii, it was one of group of a Beach party films made during the decade.

== Plot ==
Kit, a woman in Hawaii, gets involved in a robbery.

== Cast ==
- Joy Harmon as Kit Williams
- Anthony Eisley as Chick Lindell
- Adele Claire as Brandy Saveties
- David Whorf as Lou Talbot
- Edgar Bergen as Sweeney
- Lee Krieger as Charley Rossi
- Ken Mayer as Hugo Sokol
- Harold Fong as Quong
- Ralph Nanalei as Paulo
- Aime Luce as Tahitian Dancer
- Alvy Moore as Maxwell

== Production ==
It was shot on location in Hawaii in June 1964. Part of the finance came from Argonaught International, a Hawaiian company.

The film was released by United Screen Arts, a new company formed by Dale Robertson.

== Reception ==
Variety wrote "A slick comedy of errors. this kooky, offbeat production, basking in a Hawaiian locale, presents a frisky plot, workable comedic situations, subtle color and eager acting by unknowns, as well as some nicely photographed ethnic dancing... Harmon carries the weight of the show, but plot soon loses crazymixed-up girl approach to concentrate on robbing the robbers story. Film is neither purely for the juves nor for the older set, but film has snicker appeal."

== Bibliography ==
- Thomas Lisanti. Hollywood Surf and Beach Movies: The First Wave, 1959–1969. McFarland, 2015.
