= Lightning Bolt (film) =

- Italian film poster
- Directed by: Anthony Dawson
- Screenplay by: Alfonso Balcázar; Jose Antonio De La Loma (uncredited)
- Produced by: Giuseppe De Blasio; Anacleto Fontini
- Starring: Anthony Eisley; Wandisa Guida; Folco Lulli
- Cinematography: Riccardo Pallottini
- Edited by: Juan Oliver
- Music by: Riz Ortolani
- Production companies: Seven Film/BGA; P.C. Balcazar
- Release dates: April 1966 (Rome); 1966 (Spain)
- Running time: 94 minutes
- Countries: Italy; Spain

Lightning Bolt (Italian: Operazione Goldman) is a 1966 spy-fi film shot in Techniscope in 1965 that was directed by Anthony Dawson in his first entry into the Eurospy genre. The film was co-financed and released in the US by the Woolner Brothers who re-titled it Lightning Bolt with the tagline "strikes like a ball of thunder". It was released as a double feature with Red Dragon in 1967 two years after the film had been shot. The film's star, Anthony Eisley, commented that the film was released too late to take advantage of the James Bond craze.

== Plot ==
Department "S" of the Federal Security Investigation Commission sends Harry Sennitt, an international secret agent nicknamed "Goldman" due to his unlimited expense account, to investigate suspected sabotage of US space program rocket launches. Sennitt, who carries a chequebook instead of a weapon, and his superior, Captain Flanagan, discover an Auric Goldfinger-type beer baron named Rehte is destroying the rockets with laser beams fired from Rehte's beer trucks parked outside the installation. Rehte's lair is a Dr No-type underwater city off the coast of Cape Canaveral, where he plans to launch a rocket to the Moon carrying a laser cannon that will be targeted at cities on Earth.

== Cast ==
- Anthony Eisley as Lt. Harry Sennitt
- Wandisa Guida as Kary (as Wandisa Leigh)
- Folco Lulli as Rehte
- Diana Lorys as Capt. Patricia Flanagan, "Agent 36-22-36"
- Francisco Sanz as Prof. Rooney (as Paco Sanz)
- Luisa Rivelli as Ursula Parker
- Barta Barri as Senator Woolner
- Renato Montalbano as Mills

== Production ==
Sent to Italy by the Woolner Brothers, former Hawaiian Eye actor Anthony Eisley was told by director Antonio Margheriti that he looked "too Italian". Margheriti insisted Eisley's dark hair be dyed blonde; it came out red. Eisley recalled that working on the film in Rome and in Lazio, where the production designer recreated Florida, was one of the most fun experiences he ever had.

To make the film seem as if it had been made in the United States, the director, Margheriti, was billed as "Anthony Dawson" and Wandisa Guida was billed as "Wandisa Leigh".

Eisley recalled that the original negative of the film was lost and for its American release it had to be reassembled from various prints, which gave it a varying but low picture quality.

== Release ==
US Woolner Brothers 1967 newspaper advertisement

Lightning Bolt was released in Rome in April 1966 as Operazione Goldman with a 96-minute running time and in Spain in 1966 as Operación Goldman with a 100-minute running time.

== Reception ==
The Monthly Film Bulletin described the dubbed dialogue as "taut, witty, even idiomatic" and added that it camouflages "what were obviously rather wooden performances". The review went on to note that the sets of underwater city are "particularly attractive".

Variety stated that the film's plot unfolded in a "professional and rapid" manner, but it was still "standard spy fare". The review also noted that Margheriti's direction was "adequate" while Riz Ortolani's score was an unusual departure for him, and closer to Morricone's music for the Dollars Trilogy.

in 1986, Kim Newman wrote about the film in the Monthly Film Bulletin while covering the "Eurospy" trend. Newman described the film as "fast, witty and absurd enough to pass muster."

In Phil Hardy's book Science Fiction (1984), Lightning Bolt is described as "one of the better pieces of Italian hokum that have their origin in the operatic technology of the James Bond series of films". Hardy praises the sets, particularly the underwater city, and the "apocalyptic conflagration at the end", as "wittily engineered".

== Notes ==
=== References ===
- Hardy, Phil, ed. (1984). Science Fiction. New York : Morrow. ISBN 0-688-00842-9.
- Paul, Louis (2005). Italian Horror Film Directors. McFarland. ISBN 0786487496.
- Weaver, Tom (2006). 'Interviews with B Science Fiction and Horror Movie Makers: Writers, Producers, Directors, Actors, Moguls and Makeup. McFarland.
- Willis, Donald, ed. (1985). Variety's Complete Science Fiction Reviews. Garland Publishing Inc. ISBN 0-8240-6263-9.
