= The Couch (film) =

1962 film

- Theatrical release poster
- Directed by: Owen Crump
- Screenplay by: Robert Bloch
- Story by: Blake Edwards; Owen Crump
- Produced by: Owen Crump
- Starring: Grant Williams; Shirley Knight; Onslow Stevens
- Cinematography: Harold E. Stine
- Edited by: Leo H. Shreve
- Music by: Frank Perkins
- Production company: Warner Bros. Pictures
- Distributed by: Warner Bros. Pictures
- Release date: February 21, 1962
- Running time: 100 minutes
- Country: United States
- Language: English

The Couch is a 1962 American psychological horror film directed by Owen Crump from a screenplay by Robert Bloch and a story by Blake Edwards and Owen Crump. The film stars Grant Williams, Shirley Knight, and Onslow Stevens. The film was released by Warner Bros. Pictures on February 21, 1962.

== Plot ==
A young man named Charles Campbell phones the police, announcing that a murder will be committed at seven o'clock. At 7:00 p.m., Charles stabs a stranger on the streets with an icepick; he then reports to Dr. Janz for his daily psychiatric session. Although it is after 7:00, Charles tells receptionist Terry, that it is exactly 7:00 – she has mislaid her watch and is unaware of the exact time. Charles returns the icepick to the bar in the practice, from where he had taken it.

Charles has been paroled following a two-year prison term for rape on condition that he undergo daily psychiatric treatment. Beyond being Janz's patient, he is carrying on a romantic relationship with Terry, who is also Janz's niece. As fraternization with patients is not permitted, they keep their relationship clandestine. On a walk together one night, Charles tells Terry that he is seeing Janz as a condition of parole following a manslaughter conviction in the death of his sister Ruthie and that he is tormented with guilt for being at the wheel in the car accident that killed her.

Days after the first murder, he kills again in the same manner, again announcing this in advance to the police. Campbell had actually stolen Terry's watch, enabling him to mislead her about the time. By telling Janz that he had been in the waiting room longer than he in fact had after committing the second murder, Charles has created alibis for himself for the times of the two murders; seemingly being at the practice at 7:00 on the nights in question, he cannot be what headlines have dubbed the "7:00 Killer." In another session, when Charles makes mention of his deceased mother and wanting to kill his father, Janz confronts his delusion that his father is alive and that Ruthie is dead: in fact, his father is already dead, and Ruthie is alive, "dead" to him because her marriage and relocation represented the death of the love from an ersatz mother.

Charles's next victim is Janz. After stabbing the doctor in a crowded passageway at a football stadium, Charles goes to Janz's office to meet Terry. The meeting had been arranged by the two to reveal their relationship and plans to marry to Janz; as Charles had falsely told her that Janz said that he could discontinue treatment, she believes that there is no obstacle to their being together. Charles also lies that he has come from another meeting confirming a large inheritance, saying that he is now free to do anything. Charles then attempts to seduce her. While she is trying to repel him, they are interrupted by a phone call notifying Terry that Janz, following a stabbing, is alive but unconscious in a hospital. She and Charles race there and learn that Janz is expected to recover, but that surgery must be performed. They become separated, and Terry learns from the investigators that a handbill found in her car reveals that the car was in the area of the football match where Janz was stabbed. As Terry had lent her car to Charles just prior to the match, only he can have driven it there and received the handbill.

Charles meanwhile conceals his identity with an operating gown and mask taken from a supply room. After an unsuccessful attempt at killing Janz on the operating table, he enters the recovery room in which Janz is lying. After taking Janz on a gurney to a deserted area of the hospital, Charles reveals to Janz that the other murders were simply to throw the police off the track so that he would not be suspected; the primary intended victim had always been Janz, who represents all father-like authority and whom Charles has confused with his hated father. Before Charles can kill Janz, however, he is apprehended by the police in the presence of Terry, who sees Charles for the disturbed man he truly is.

== Cast ==
- Grant Williams as Charles Campbell
- Shirley Knight as Terry Ames
- Onslow Stevens as Dr. Janz
- William Leslie as Dr. David Lindsay
- Anne Helm as Jean Quimby
- Simon Scott as Lt. Kritzman
- Michael Bachus as Sgt. Bonner
- John Alvin as Sloan
- Harry Holcombe as District Attorney
- Hope Summers as Mrs. Quimby

== See also ==
- List of American films of 1962
