= Doomsday Machine (film) =

- Directed by: Herbert J. Leder; Harry Hope; Lee Sholem
- Written by: Stuart J. Byrne
- Produced by: Harry Hope
- Starring: Denny Miller; Ruta Lee; Grant Williams; Mala Powers; Henry Wilcoxon; Bobby Van
- Cinematography: Stanley Cortez
- Distributed by: Cine-Find
- Release date: 1972
- Running time: 83 minutes
- Country: United States
- Language: English

Doomsday Machine, also known as Escape from Planet Earth (video title), is an American science fiction film mostly filmed in 1967 but completed without the original cast or sets in 1972.

== Plot ==
Doomsday Machine

A spy discovers that the Chinese government has created a doomsday device (the "key" to which, "only Chairman Mao has") capable of destroying the Earth and it will be activated in 72 hours. Soon after, Astra – a two-year return mission to Venus by the United States Space Program – has its time of launch speeded up and half of the male flight crew are replaced by women shortly before take-off, including one Russian. Shortly before blastoff military alerts are put into effect.

After leaving Earth, the seven crew members of Astra deduce that they have been put together to restart the human race should the Chinese activate their device. Shortly after this, the device goes off and Earth is destroyed.

As Astra continues to Venus, the crew discovers that a safe landing on Venus is impossible unless the crew is reduced to three. Going mad, Mason tries to rape Carlson, at which point she accidentally gets them both blown out of an airlock.

Two more crew-members—Danny and Major Bronski—are lost as they head out to repair a fault with the spaceship. However, they notice another spacecraft nearby and jump to it. The second craft proves to be a lost Soviet ship that disappeared piloted by a close friend of the Russian crew member. Though its pilot is dead, Danny and Bronski successfully power up the Soviet ship. Before the two ships can rendezvous, contact with Astra is lost.

A disembodied voice cuts in, claiming to be the collective consciousness of the Venusian population. The voice informs the survivors (whom the Venusians refer to as the "Last of Man") in the Russian ship that Astra no longer exists (presumably destroyed somehow by the telepathic Venusians), and that the ship (due to the "self-destructive" potential of humans) will be not allowed to reach Venus. It gives a cryptic message regarding the prospect of starting new life in a "very strange and very great" place, somewhere far "beyond the rim of the universe," before the ship suddenly blasts off, apparently by the power of the Venusians, and the movie abruptly concludes.

== Cast ==
- Bobby Van as Danny
- Ruta Lee as Dr. Marion Turner
- Mala Powers as Maj. Georgianna Bronski
- James Craig as Dr. Haines
- Grant Williams as Maj. Kurt Mason
- Henry Wilcoxon as Dr. Christopher Perry
- Essie Lin Chia as Girl Spy
- Casey Kasem as Mission Control Officer
- Lorri Scott as Lt. Katie Carlson
- Denny Miller as Col. Don Price (billed as Scott Miller)
- Mike Farrell as 1st Reporter

== Production ==
Production of Doomsday Machine began in 1967 under Herbert J. Leder's direction under the titles Armageddon 1975 and Doomsday Plus Seven. Production stopped on the film before it was completed (presumably due to funding problems), and the unfinished footage lay in storage for several years. Production resumed in 1972, though without benefit of access to the original cast members, costumes or sets.

Sloppy production standards have made the film a favorite for buffs of bad cinema. The film relies extensively on stock footage, including real (but badly degraded) NASA rocket footage, special effects shots from David L. Hewitt's The Wizard of Mars (1965; Hewitt receives a special effects credit for Doomsday Machine), Gorath (1962) and other disparate sources, leading to numerous continuity errors. Among such mistakes is the external appearance of the Astra, which inexplicably changes throughout the film. The protracted last segment of the movie – with an American and Russian astronaut boarding a derelict Soviet spacecraft – was obviously shot after the unfinished principal photography without the participation of the original actors. After this point, the characters stay in their spacesuits, which look different from those shown in the immediately preceding scenes, and their helmets are now opaque, concealing the doubles' faces. The characters do speak but now with different voices. The slow, repetitive pacing of this sequence is also markedly different from the rest of the film and suggests an effort to pad the film's running time out in order to reach a desired length.

== In popular culture ==
- Featured on Elvira's Movie Macabre
- Second film riffed in the Cinematic Titanic series
- Reviewed by the Nostalgia Critic on Best of TGWTG Volume 3
- Reviewed by Bill Gibron of PopMatters
