= Old San Francisco =

1927 film by Alan Crosland

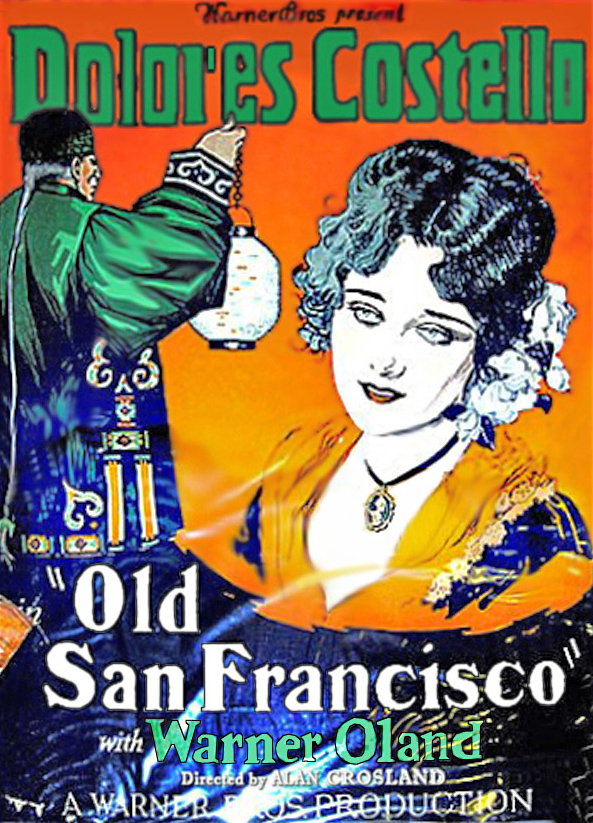
- Theatrical release poster
- Directed by: Alan Crosland
- Written by: Jack Jarmuth (titles)
- Screenplay by: Anthony Coldeway
- Story by: Darryl F. Zanuck
- Starring: Dolores Costello
- Cinematography: Hal Mohr
- Edited by: Harold McCord
- Music by: Hugo Riesenfeld
- Production company: Warner Bros. Pictures
- Distributed by: Warner Bros. Pictures
- Release dates: June 21, 1927 (NYC); September 4, 1927 (US)
- Running time: 88 minutes; 7,961 feet (2,427 m)
- Country: United States
- Languages: Sound (Synchronized) (English Intertitles)
- Budget: $300,000
- Box office: $638,000

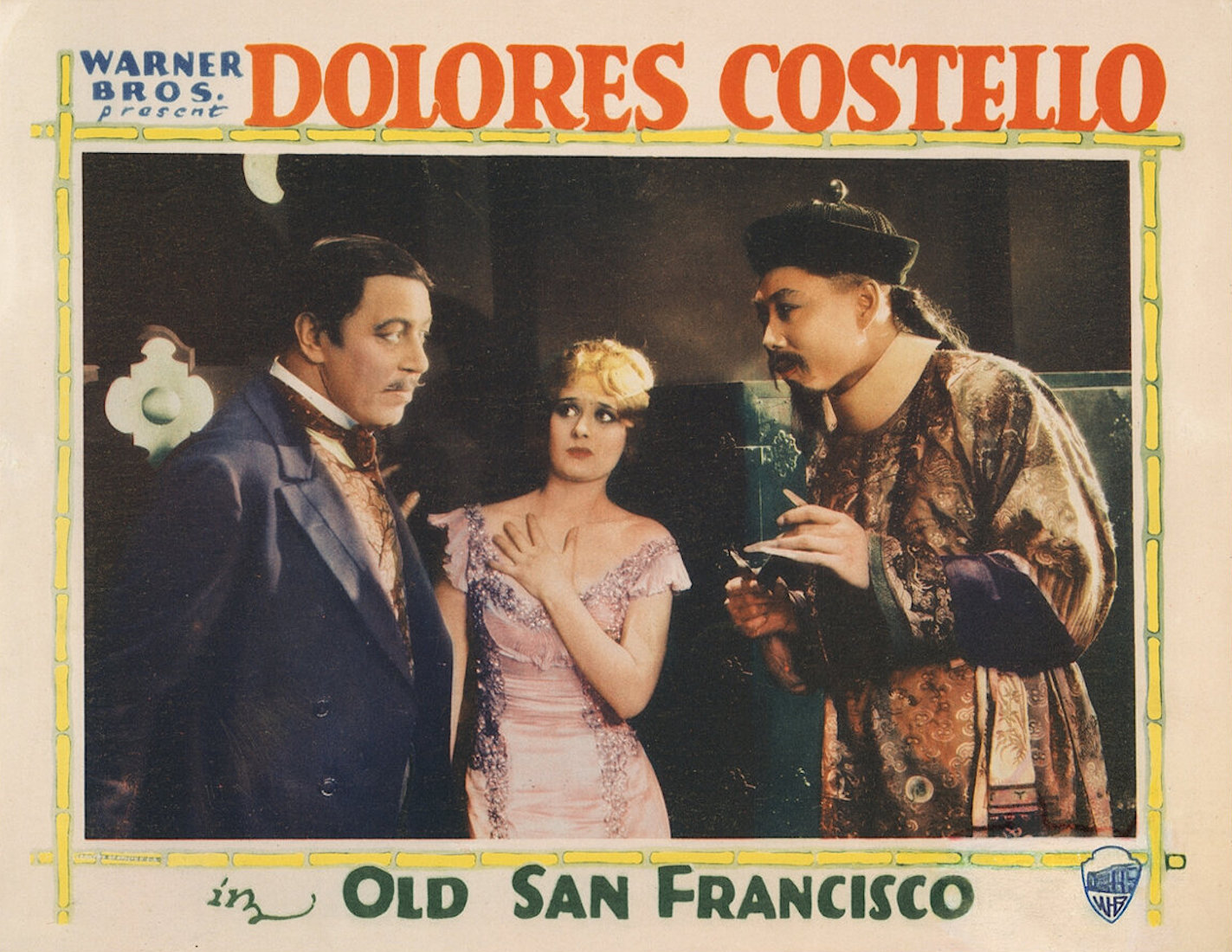
Lobby card

Old San Francisco (1927)

Old San Francisco is a 1927 American synchronized sound historical drama film starring Dolores Costello and featuring Warner Oland. While the film has no audible dialog, it was released with a synchronized musical score with sound effects using the Vitaphone sound-on-disc process. The film, produced and distributed by Warner Bros., was directed by Alan Crosland.

== Plot ==
Chris Buckwell, cruel and greedy czar of San Francisco's Tenderloin District, is heartless in his persecution of the Chinese, though he himself is secretly a half-caste, part Chinese and part European. Buckwell, eager to possess the land of Don Hernandez Vasquez, sends Michael Brandon, an unscrupulous attorney, to make an offer. Brandon's nephew, Terrence, meets the grandee's beautiful daughter, Dolores, while Vasquez refuses the offer. Terry tries to save the Vasquez land grants, but when Chris causes the grandee's death, Dolores takes an oath to avenge her father. Learning that Chris is half Chinese, Dolores induces his feeble-minded dwarf brother to denounce him; he captures her and Terry, but they are saved from white slavery by the great earthquake of 1906 that kills the villain.

== Cast ==
- Dolores Costello as Dolores Vasquez
- Warner Oland as Chris Buckwell
- Charles E. Mack as Terrence "Terry" O'Shaughnessy
- Josef Swickard as Don Hernandez de Vasquez
- Anders Randolph as Michael Brandon
- Angelo Rossita as Chang Loo, a dwarf
- Anna May Wong as A Flower of the Orient
- Lawson Butt as Captain Enrique de Solano Y Vasquez (in Prologue)
- Walter McGrail as Vasquez's grandson, who gets shot (in Prologue)
- Otto Matieson as another Vasquez grandson (in Prologue)
- Martha Mattox as Mother Vasquez (in Prologue)
- Thomas Santschi as Captain Stoner (in Prologue)
- Louise Carver as Big nosed woman on the Mile of Hell (uncredited)
- Rose Dione as Madame in Den of Iniquity (uncredited)
- Willie Fung as Chang Sue Lee's laughing servant (uncredited)
- Tom McGuire as Man at poodle dog cafe (uncredited)
- John Miljan as Don Luis (uncredited)
- Sōjin Kamiyama as Lu Fong (uncredited)

== Production ==
The film's soundtrack was recorded via the Vitaphone sound-on-disc process to produce a synchronized musical score with sound effects. It was the fifth Warner Brothers feature film to have Vitaphone musical accompaniment. Just one month later, on October 6, Warner Bros. released The Jazz Singer with music, sound effects, and spoken dialogue. Warner Bros. later reused some of the footage from Old San Francisco for the 1906 San Francisco earthquake sequence in The Sisters (1938). This is Charles Emmett Mack's final film appearance; he was killed in an automobile accident six months prior to the film's release.

== Reception and box office ==
The film was a commercial success but it was considered a sub-par feature for its salacious elements. The New York Post called it "violently melodramatic and preposterous in the extreme -- and one of the silliest pictures ever made."

A slightly later reviewer wondered cynically why it had not been censored: "Just as the villain is giving thanks to Buddha, the San Francisco earthquake intervenes to save [Dolores and Terry], thus explaining a catastrophe that cost many lives. Old San Francisco was not censored because it satisfied the one great tenet of the movie censors: 'God is a force in the world that moves to preserve Christian virginity.' "

According to Warner Bros records the film earned $466,000 domestically and $172,000 foreign.

== Preservation status ==
A print of the film still exists at the Library of Congress, George Eastman House and Wisconsin Center for Film and Theater Research, as well as its Vitaphone soundtrack and has been restored by the UCLA Film and Television Archive in association with other organizations such as the Library of Congress and the Museum of Modern Art. And was released on manufactured-on-demand DVD by the Warner Archive Collection series on September 15, 2009.

== See also ==
- List of early sound feature films (1926–1929)
- List of early Warner Bros. sound and talking features
