= Monster (1980 film) =

Monstroid
- Original theatrical one-sheet poster
- Directed by: Kenneth Hartford
- Written by: Kenneth Hartford; Walter Roeber Schmidt; Garland Scott; Herbert L. Strock
- Produced by: Kenneth Harftford (producer); Garland Scott (producer)
- Starring: James Mitchum; John Carradine; Philip Carey; Anthony Eisley
- Cinematography: Art Fitzsimmons; J. Wilder Mincey
- Edited by: Michael Johnson
- Music by: Gene Kauer
- Production company: Academy International
- Distributed by: M & M
- Release date: July 11, 1980 (United States)
- Running time: 98 minutes
- Country: United States
- Languages: English, Spanish

Monstroid is a 1980 American monster movie produced and directed by Kenneth Herts (as Kenneth Hartford), co-written with Herbert L. Strock, and starring James Mitchum and John Carradine. Strock later claimed he co-directed the film uncredited. It was originally to be titled Monster when the film was first announced in 1975, and again in 1977, and suffered numerous cast changes (Keenan Wynn was still billed on some of the early video releases). The film was eventually released in U.S. on July 11, 1980 as Monstroid, and is also known as Monstroid: It Came from the Lake (American DVD box title) and The Toxic Horror (American alternative title). A novelization written by Peter Crowcroft was released concurrently with the film. Hartford had his own children (Glen and Andrea) play the two teenagers in the film.

The film billed itself as being based on a true story that took place in "Chimayo, Colombia", in 1971. However, the film was actually shot in Chimayo, New Mexico, and Ambalema, Colombia. Some of the film was also shot in the Santuario de Chimayo, with John Carradine playing a priest.

== Plot ==
One night in the fishing village of Chimayo, Colombia, María Reyes witnesses a monster devouring her husband José. Some years later, the American cement manufacturer Durado Cement dispatches troubleshooter Bill Travis to Chimayo to restore order to their manufacturing plant there: an anticorporate activist named Víctor Sánchez has been exploiting the villagers' fear of the monster to stir up hostility against Durado, which has been polluting their fishing waters in Lake Chimayo. In the process, María has become ostracized from the villagers; a group led by a man named Carlos calls her la bruja ("the witch"). In addition, Travis must silence an American TV reporter named Patty Clark, who has been exposing the pollution of the lake.

In Chimayo, children Andrea and Glen Anderson observe strange ripples in the lake. Glen claims they belong to an animal he has been sighting in the lake for some time. Their father Pete, administrator of the Durado plant, is introduced to Mayor Montero and his daughter, helicopter pilot Juanita. Sánchez meets with Carlos in a church, and together they plot to drive out the Americans, and the monster he thinks was created by the pollution of the lake. When María goes to visit José's grave, Carlos's men attack her.

Juanita picks up Travis at the airport. When he gets to Chimayo, he is accosted by Clark, and curtly refuses any interviews. Meanwhile, Pete is trying to break up with his secretary Laura to pursue a new affair with Juanita, but cannot bring himself to do it. He visits her again that night when she is skinny dipping in the lake, and successfully breaks up with her, but the monster emerges from the lake and kills Laura after he leaves. The town is busy celebrating its 200th anniversary and the body goes undiscovered until the next morning.

Travis and the plant doctor investigate the killing, and link it to José's death. Glen tells Travis about the animal he saw, convincing Travis that something is in the lake. Soon afterwards, Sánchez meets Travis and threatens violence against Durado. Travis and Montero confront Clark about her reporting, and they negotiate exclusive rights to the pollution story in exchange for her temporary silence. Travis also calls his boss Barnes to request sonar equipment with which to track the monster. Determined to prove the monster's existence, Glen decides to stake out the lake at night. He drags Andrea along, and they manage to take some photographs of the monster before it attacks some drunken fishermen.

They present their evidence to Travis while the village continues celebrating its anniversary. Simultaneously, Sánchez sets some plastic explosives to blow up the plant. However, he gets trapped after lighting the fuse. Meanwhile, a party of men chases María, whom they blame for all their troubles. The town priest claims that he can exorcise her, but the men are unconvinced and burn her at the stake. Sánchez's bomb goes off, and the next day, Travis reveals that the plant has been badly damaged and María severely burned. Consequently, she is airlifted to a Panamanian hospital in Chimayo's only helicopter to get treatment.

Travis comes up with a plan to kill the beast; he stuffs some explosives into a goat carcass, which he will hang by the detonator cord from a helicopter. To obtain a new chopper, Juanita lures some rescue workers with a fake mayday and hijacks their craft at gunpoint. They get to the lake and the Nessie-like monster takes the bait, but Travis loses the detonator and dives in after it. A local policeman distracts the monster by circling it with his boat, thus buying Travis enough time to retrieve the detonator and blow the creature to pieces.

Some time later, though, the Andersons are down by the lake again, and their German Shepherd finds a large egg. A reptilian creature hatches out of it, and the film ends as the camera pans over a clutch of dozens of similar eggs.

== Cast ==
- James Mitchum as Travis
- John Carradine as The Priest
- Philip Carey as Barnes
- Anthony Eisley as Pete
- Andrea Hartford as Andrea
- Glen Hartford as Glen
- Coral Kassel as Laura
- Aldo Sambrell as Victor
- Connie Moore as Patty
- Maria Rubio as Juanita

== Release ==
=== Home media ===
The film made its debut on DVD by Shout Factory on September 25, 2007 as a part of its Elvira's Movie Macabre double feature with Blue Sunshine. (Although the video case says Monstroid, the film's on-screen title reads Monster. Elvira, however, verbally refers to the film as Monstroid.)

It was later released by Substance under the title Monstroid: It Came from the Lake on January 15, 2008. On May 6, that same year, it was released by Televista as It Came From the Lake. 2 It was released by Mill Creek Entertainment on August 17, 2010 as a part of Pure Terror: 50 Movies pack, and again on their "Tales of Terror" 200 movie DVD set, released December 3, 2013.

== Reception ==
Monster received mostly negative reviews from critic upon its release. Joseph A. Ziemba from Bleeding Skull! panned the film, calling it "a mess", criticizing the film as being endlessly talkative. Ziemba also criticized the film's acting, "cut ‘n’ paste exploitation plot", phony monster design, and poor video quality. Octavio Ramos from Axs.com gave the film a negative review, writing, "Monstroid: It Came from the Lake is perhaps only of interest to residents of Northern New Mexico or anyone interested in the Santuario de Chimayo. There are actual filmed scenes of the interior of the Santuario with John Carradine, which is [sic] worth gold to some viewers. Otherwise, don’t bother with this movie. It is in all ways a disappointment."
