= The Mummy and the Curse of the Jackals =

- Directed by: Oliver Drake
- Written by: William C. Edwards
- Produced by: William C. Edwards; Manuel J. Robbins
- Starring: Anthony Eisley; John Carradine; Robert Alan Browne; Marliza Pons
- Cinematography: William Troiano
- Edited by: Irwin Cadden
- Music by: John Seely
- Production company: Vega International
- Distributed by: Academy Home Entertainment (1985/6, VHS) (Note: Sources differ on whether the film was released on video in either 1986 or 1985.); Severin Films (2024, Blu-ray)
- Release date: 1969
- Running time: 86 minutes
- Country: United States
- Language: English

The Mummy and the Curse of the Jackals is a 1969 American independent horror film directed by Oliver Drake and written and produced by William Edwards, starring Anthony Eisley, John Carradine, Robert Alan Browne and Marliza Pons. The film is known for its premise, featuring a mummy and a "were-jackal", and for its troubled production history: It was shot on location in Las Vegas in 1969, but it went unreleased until it surfaced on video in the mid-1980s.

== Plot ==
Archaeologist David Barrie (Anthony Eisley) uncovers two sarcophagi: one containing the well-preserved 4,000-year-old Princess Akana (Marliza Pons) and another containing a mummy, Sirahk (Saul Goldsmith). He transports them to a remote house near Las Vegas for further study.

Upon reading ancient texts, Barrie learns of a curse: anyone who spends a night with the princess under a full moon will transform into a jackal. The princess eventually revives and uses the curse to turn Barrie into a nocturnal "jackal-man" to serve her. Meanwhile, the mummy is reanimated, seemingly with the intent to reclaim her. The two monsters eventually clash in the streets of Las Vegas, culminating in a final confrontation at Lake Mead.

== Cast ==
- Anthony Eisley as David Barrie
- John Carradine as Prof. Cummings
- Robert Alan Browne as Bob (as Robert Allen Browne)
- Maurine Dawson as Donna
- Marliza Pons as Princess Akana
- Saul Goldsmith as The Mummy
- Burke Reynolds as Old Drunk
- William Whitton as Pharaoh
- Rebecca Rothchild as Goddess
- Frankie Dee as Marti
- Judy Cassell as Dress Shop Girl
- Nancy Sheldon as Show Girl

== Production ==
The film has been described as a "knockoff" of the classic Universal Monsters horror films, with Tom Weaver in John Carradine: The Films noting that "Jackals [is] heavily indebted to the Universal series plot-wise." The mummy has been described as a "Kharis-like killer", and it's been noted that "Sirahk" is "Kharis" spelled backwards. Director Oliver Drake, who was usually a B movie Western director, was also an uncredited screenwriter for The Mummy's Curse (1944), the final Kharis installment. Princess Akana's name has also been pointed out as recalling Ananka, a recurring character in Universal's mummy films who was also a princess. Anthony Eisley also called his "jackal man" character "just a rip off of the Wolf Man."

Scott Brady was originally scheduled to portray the role of archaeologist David Barrie while Anthony Eisley was cast in the role of his friend, but Brady dropped out of the project, so Eisley took the part of Barrie, with Robert Alan Browne stepping in for the role of the friend. It has been reported that Lon Chaney Jr. was offered the role of the mummy, but turned it down due to being recovering from an operation.

Director Oliver Drake "was quite senile at the time", Eisley was quoted as saying on the book Interviews with B Science Fiction and Horror Movie Makers. Eisley recalled that "[t]he director was sort of losing his faculties, and I realized after a few days that he really didn't know what the hell was going on at all times." Eisley further claimed that upon realizing this, he had his stunt double (who he had befriended) portray his character while transformed, after having spent an entire day shooting the character's transformation scene, "And the director never knew it!"

Parts of the film were shot on the streets of Las Vegas; with some reviews highlighting that real by-standers appear in exterior shots.

== Release ==
While the film was shot in 1969, it remained in obscurity until it was released on video in the mid-1980s. In 2024, a 4K restored version was released on Blu-ray by Severin Films.

== Reception ==
The film developed a cult following among fans of bizarre cinema for its accidental humor and surreal nature, with critical reviews often highlighting the costumes of the mummy and the "were-jackal". Several reviews also made note of a line said by John Carradine's character: "We can't just stand-by and let a 4,000-year-old mummy and a jackal-man take over the city."

Bryan Senn, on The Werewolf Filmography: 300+ Movies, wrote "Though Jackals offers the unintentional chuckle [...] its dull pacing and incoherence [...] makes it tough going even for the so-bad-it's-good crowd." He wrote, in reference to the report that Lon Chaney Jr. turned down the role of the mummy, "Watching the Kharis clone shambling down a crowded Vegas street, with bemused by-standers gawking, laughing and even following behind the silly-suited actor, it's little wonder why." Senn concluded, in reference to Eisley's claim that due to being senile, director Drake "really didn't know what the hell was going on at all times," "And neither will the viewer."

Matthew Coniam in Egyptomania Goes to the Movies: From Archaeology to Popular Craze to Hollywood Fantasy described the fight between the mummy and the were-jackal as a fight "which resembles two drunk fathers fighting at a wedding."

Tom Weaver in John Carradine: The Films was highly critical of the film in comparison with the Universal mummy films, writing that "even the worst of the original Mummy movies towers above this cheap, murky, amateurish abomination. The only thing Jackals has going for it is the fact that it is so throughly inept that parts [of it] are actually funny."

== Bibliography ==
- Senn, Bryan (2024). Fantastic Cinema Subject Guide: A Topical Index to 2,500 Horror, Science Fiction, and Fantasy Films. McFarland. ISBN 978-1-4766-1902-6.
