= Angelo Rossitto =

American actor (1908–1991)

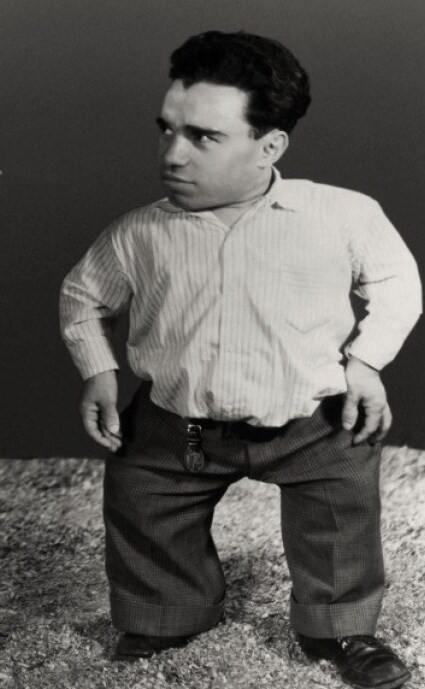
- Rossitto in Freaks (1932)
- Born: Angelo Salvatore Rossitto; February 18, 1908; Omaha, Nebraska, U.S.
- Died: September 21, 1991 (aged 83); Los Angeles, California, U.S.
- Occupations: Actor, voice artist
- Years active: 1927–1987
- Height: 2 ft 11 in (89 cm)

Angelo Rossitto acting in selected scenes from the 1927 film Old San Francisco

Angelo Salvatore Rossitto (February 18, 1908 – September 21, 1991) was an American actor and voice artist. He had dwarfism and was 2 ft 11 in (89 cm) tall, and was often billed as Little Angie or Moe. Angelo first appeared in silent films opposite Lon Chaney and John Barrymore. On screen, he portrayed everything from dwarfs, midgets, gnomes and pygmies as well as monsters, villains and aliens, with appearances in more than 70 films.

== Early life ==
Angelo Salvatore Rossitto was born on February 18, 1908, in Omaha, Nebraska. Rossitto had dwarfism and grew to an adult height of 2 ft 11 in (89 cm).

== Career ==
At the age of 19, in 1927, Rossitto was discovered by actor John Barrymore, who cast him opposite himself in The Beloved Rogue (1927), marking Rossitto's screen debut. Later that year, still aged 19, he also appeared in Old San Francisco.

During the late silent film era and the transition to sound, he continued appearing in motion pictures. During the Great Depression, Rossitto, aged 24, appeared as Angeleno in Tod Browning's Freaks (1932). Six years later, in 1938, aged 30, he appeared in Child Bride, another controversial film. During and after the Second World War, Rossitto appeared in several Poverty Row films starring actor Bela Lugosi. During the 1950s, 1960s and 1970s, he continued acting in film and television, appearing in Alex in Wonderland (1970), Brain of Blood (1971), Dracula vs. Frankenstein (1971), Little Cigars (1973), and Fairy Tales (1978). He also made frequent television appearances, including roles in the police drama Baretta.

In 1985, at the age of 77, Rossitto portrayed Master opposite actor Mel Gibson in Mad Max Beyond Thunderdome.

Rossitto remained active until 1987. His screen career spanned six decades and more than 70 films.

== Popular culture ==
Rossitto appears alongside singer/songwriter Tom Waits and Lee Kolima on the cover art of Waits' 1983 album Swordfishtrombones, which pays homage to his performance in Freaks. He also appears on the cover of Bob Dylan's album The Basement Tapes.

== Filmography ==
- The Beloved Rogue (1927) as Beppo - the Dwarf (film debut)
- Old San Francisco (1927) as Chang Loo - the Dwarf
- While the City Sleeps (1928) as Member of Skeeter's Gang (uncredited)
- The Viking (1928) as Viking Dwarf (uncredited)
- Seven Footprints to Satan (1929) as The Dwarf
- One Stolen Night (1929) as The Dwarf
- The Mysterious Island (1929) as Underwater Creature (uncredited)
- The Big House (1930) as Inmate (uncredited)
- The Phantom of Paris (1931) as Prisoner (uncredited)
- Freaks (1932) as Angeleno
- The Sign of the Cross (1932) as Impaled Pygmy (uncredited)
- Meet the Champ (1933, Short) as Midget
- Carnival Lady (1933) as Dwarf (uncredited)
- I Believed in You (1934) as Greenwich Village Waiter (uncredited)
- Babes in Toyland (1934) as Elmer - Second Little Pig/1st Sandman in Cave (uncredited)
- Dante's Inferno (1935) as Passenger in Boiler Room (uncredited)
- A Midsummer Night's Dream (1935) as Gnome (uncredited)
- Stand-In (1937) as Little Person Entering Studio Gate (uncredited)
- Child Bride (1938) as Angelo
- Mr. Wong in Chinatown (1939) as Mute Dwarf (uncredited)
- The Wizard of Oz (1939) as Munchkin Villager (uncredited)
- Doomed to Die (1940) as Newsboy #3 in Montage (uncredited)
- Spooks Run Wild (1941) as Luigi
- Hellzapoppin' (1941) as Dwarf Devil (uncredited)
- The Corpse Vanishes (1942) as Toby
- The Spider Woman (1944) as Obongo - Pygmy (uncredited)
- Ali Baba and the Forty Thieves (1944) as Arab Dwarf (uncredited)
- Lady in the Dark (1944) as Bunny, Midget (uncredited)
- Two Smart People (1946) as Street Musician (uncredited)
- Scared to Death (1947) as Indigo
- The Sin of Harold Diddlebock (1947) as Midget (uncredited)
- Samson and Delilah (1949) - Midget at Arena (uncredited)
- The Baron of Arizona (1950) as Angie - Gypsy
- Pygmy Island (1950) as Pygmy in Cave (uncredited)
- The Bandit Queen (1950) as Nino
- The Greatest Show on Earth (1952) as Midget (uncredited)
- Mesa of Lost Women (1953) as Dwarf Lab Assistant (uncredited)
- Jungle Moon Men (1955) -as Smallest Moon-Man (uncredited)
- Dementia (1955) as Newsboy (uncredited)
- Carousel (1956) as Midget (uncredited)
- Invasion of the Saucer Men (1957) as Saucer Man
- The Story of Mankind (1957) as Dwarf in Nero's Court (uncredited)
- The Wild and the Innocent (1959) as Midget (uncredited)
- Pocketful of Miracles (1961) as Angie (uncredited)
- The Magic Sword (1962) as 2nd Dwarf (uncredited)
- Confessions of an Opium Eater (1962) as Newspaper Boy (uncredited)
- The Wonderful World of the Brothers Grimm (1962) as Dwarf (uncredited)
- Requiem for a Heavyweight (1962) as Midget Wrestler Outside Wrestling Ring (uncredited)
- Terrified (1962) as Midget (uncredited)
- The Perils of Pauline (1967) as Pygmy Leader's Assistant (uncredited)
- The Trip (1967) as Dwarf in Forest Fantasy (uncredited)
- Doctor Dolittle (1967) as Dwarf (uncredited)
- Pufnstuf (1970) as Seymore Spider / Clang
- Alex in Wonderland (1970) as Fellini #1
- Brain of Blood (1971) as Dorro
- Dracula vs. Frankenstein (1971) as Grazbo
- Little Cigars (1973) as Angelo
- The Stone Killer (1973) as Little Man in Hotel Lobby (uncredited)
- The Clones (1973) as Man at Phone Booth
- The Master Gunfighter (1975) as Side show midget
- I Wonder Who's Killing Her Now? (1975) as Little Pianist/Newsboy
- Fairy Tales (1978) as Otto
- The Lord of the Rings (1978) as Character Actor (voice)
- The Dark (1979) as Angie (uncredited)
- Galaxina (1980) as Monster from Egg
- Can't Stop the Music (1980) as Fruit seller (uncredited)
- Smokey Bites the Dust (1981) as Desk Clerk
- Something Wicked This Way Comes (1983) as Little Person #1
- Mad Max Beyond Thunderdome (1985) as The Master
- From a Whisper to a Scream (1987) as Tinker
- The Other Side of the Wind (2018) as himself (final film role, released posthumously)

== See also ==
- Little People of America
