= The Navy vs. the Night Monsters =

1966 film by Michael A. Hoey

- Theatrical release poster
- Directed by: Michael A. Hoey; Jon Hall (uncredited)
- Written by: Michael A. Hoey
- Based on: The Monster from Earth's End; 1959 novel by Murray Leinster
- Produced by: Jack Broder; Roger Corman (uncredited)
- Starring: Mamie Van Doren; Anthony Eisley
- Cinematography: Stanley Cortez
- Edited by: George White
- Music by: Gordon Zahler
- Production company: Standard Club of California Productions
- Distributed by: Realart Pictures Inc.
- Release date: May 19, 1966
- Running time: 87 minutes
- Country: United States
- Language: English
- Budget: $178,000

The Navy vs. the Night Monsters (a.k.a. Monsters of the Night and The Night Crawlers) is a 1966 independently made American science fiction-monster film drama produced by Jack Broder (and Roger Corman, uncredited), written and directed by Michael A. Hoey, that stars Mamie Van Doren, Anthony Eisley, Billy Gray, Bobby Van and Pamela Mason. The film was distributed by Realart Pictures Inc.

== Plot ==
The dull, workaday life at the small American Navy weather station based on Gow Island in the South Pacific is interrupted by the pending arrival of a C-47 transport for refueling. Aboard the aircraft are a team of scientists, an Air Force flight crew, and a cargo of specimens from their completed expedition to the Antarctic. On final approach, something moving in the cargo area unbalances the aircraft. The crewman sent to investigate returns, screaming, and he jumps to his death. At the naval base, the transport's radio transmits sounds of screaming and shots fired, and the descending plane suddenly weaves, veers, and crash lands on the island's single airstrip, destroying the control tower and the island's only two-way radio. The damaged aircraft also blocks the runway, preventing its further use.

Lieutenant Charles Brown is in command of Gow's weather station. He, Navy nurse Nora Hall, and biologist Arthur Beecham reach the wreck only to find that the scientists and most of the crew are now mysteriously missing. The only one aboard is the C-47's pilot, who is traumatized and in a state of shock, unable to speak. The cargo consists primarily of a few penguins, plus several prehistoric trees taken from the frozen tundra.

Unloading the cargo, Dr. Beecham recommends planting the trees to ensure their survival in the island's tropical conditions. That night, a tropical storm ravages the island. Somewhat later, Gow Island's bird population becomes disturbed by something unknown. The weather station's scientists try to figure out a connection between this event and a corrosive residue that begins turning up at various island locations.

It slowly becomes clear that the planted prehistoric trees have grown into acid-secreting, carnivorous monsters that move about Gow Island at night, at will. They reproduce fast and eventually cut off the island with their growing numbers and nocturnal assaults for food. Brown has to hold together his dwindling Navy personnel and the coterie of scientists and civilians while figuring out a way to stop this prehistoric menace. The Navy personnel's only available weapons prove largely ineffective against the tree monsters. When civilian meteorologist, Spaulding uses Molotov cocktails, fire proves to be the one thing that will destroy them.

The weather station is able to eventually restore radio contact with the mainland to ask for help. In response, the military command sends in multiple aircraft strikes from their nearest base. Fighter jets drop both napalm and fire air-to-ground missiles at the slow-moving night monsters, setting them ablaze. As a result, the threat to Gow Island's surviving personnel is quickly eliminated, and Brown and Nora are free to pursue a romance which developed in the course of fighting the menace.

== Cast ==
- Anthony Eisley as Navy Lt. Charles "Charlie" Brown
- Mamie Van Doren as Nurse Nora Hall
- Edward Faulkner as Robert Spaulding
- Walter Sande as Dr. Arthur Beecham
- Bobby Van as Ensign Rutherford Chandler
- Billy Gray as CPO Fred Twining
- Kaye Elhardt as Diane
- Pamela Mason as Marie
- Russ Bender as C.W.O. McBride
- Taggart Casey as W.O. Hollister
- Biff Elliott as Cdr. Arthur Simpson
- Phillip Terry as Base Doctor
- David Brandon
- Mike Sargent
- William Meigs
- Del West as Airplane Guard / Fireman
- Garrett Myles
- Paul Rhone
- Charles Kramer as Corpse
- Red West as Navy Fireman

== Production ==
The Navy vs. the Night Monsters was based on the 1959 science fiction novel The Monster from Earth's End by Murray Leinster. Hoey read Leinster's novel and thought it could make a good science fiction film along the lines of The Thing from Another World (1951). He optioned it and wrote a screenplay, originally titled The Nightcrawlers. Producer George Edwards read it and agreed to finance the film; because of the limited amount of money available, Hoey was hired to direct. He later stated that he was paid $10,000 for the script and his services, $4,000 of which went to Leinster for the film rights, $2,000 to the Directors Guild of America and another $1,000 to his agent, netting him only $3,000 for his efforts. The total budget for the B-movie was $178,000.

Corman provided some uncredited assistance to executive producer Broder. Hoey said that during rehearsal, Broder announced the film's new title would be The Navy vs. The Night Monsters. "The entire cast was ready to walk out", claimed Hoey. "They were furious that he would give it that title".

Broder wanted to make the film back-to-back with another film, Women of the Prehistoric Planet, using the same crew and Edwards as line producer on both. Hoey thought highly of Edwards, claiming "he was really a creative producer ... a good producer who tried to keep things away from you while you were on the set; keep the picture moving forward smoothly; keep oil on the waters. And at the same time make creative decisions that made sense, which was the antithesis of what Jack Broder did. Shooting took ten days".

=== Casting ===
The cast includes Billy Gray (of The Day the Earth Stood Still and the TV series Father Knows Best), who Hoey said "had sort of been having a tough time; he straightened his act out but was still having trouble getting back. So they made an offer and he accepted". Hoey was hoping to get a bigger name than Eisley (who was not the first choice) for the lead, but the director was happy with his performance.

Van Doren was cast because she had a commitment to make a film with Corman. Her casting resulted in Hoey turning her character into a civilian. He said, "So I put her in a tight sweater and a pair of slacks about 50 percent of the time".

The cast also features two members of Elvis Presley's Memphis Mafia, Sonny West and Red West, as well as Mason. Referring to the latter, Hoey said, "She obviously felt that it was beneath her, but she was a pro and she did what I asked her to".).

=== Special effects ===
Hoey enjoyed working with Stanley Cortez but was not happy with the practical effects used to create the moving tree monsters:

Jack Broder wouldn't hire the guy that we originally had meetings with, a guy who could have done a marvelous job...I wanted the [monster] trees to look like the other trees, so that there wouldn't be the feeling that they stood out like sore thumbs, which is what those stupid things did. Broder hired some guy who did them for $1.98. When they showed up on the set the first day, I refused to film them, I was so upset. A lot of what happened at the back end of the movie, like the little stumps walking around in the sand, was stuff that Jon Hall shot. I had nothing to do with it...Yes, the famous Jon Hall from The Hurricane [1937]. In later years he had a production company, and apparently he made a deal with Broder and went out and shot more stuff. The only tree that I worked with was the one that had the guy in it manipulating the limbs, which is the one that has the fight with the [C-47] pilot. We shot it in pretty low-key light, to try to hide as much of it as we possibly could.

== Post-production reshoots ==
Broder had requested a 90-minute film so he could sell it to television, and Hoey's original cut came in at 78 minutes. When Hoey left the film, Broder hired Arthur Pierce, director of Women of the Prehistoric Planet, to shoot additional scenes. Jon Hall was involved.

Hoey later claimed these scenes would "change the whole premise" of the film, saying, "He added all those scenes of those Navy officers in that base on the mainland. It completely ruined the premise of what I had in mind".

Eisley agreed with Hoey:

The producer totally recut the picture after it was made and totally destroyed any validity it might have had. That picture ... would have been a very good little thriller. First of all, you never saw those trees in explicit detail; you had a sense of mystery about what was killing these people on this island. As originally shot, the island radio tower was destroyed by a plane crash and there was no contact between the island and the outside world. I, as executive officer of the military Army base, was not prepared to assume command, and I had nobody I could turn to. So we played it at a level of fear and panic that wouldn't exist if we could contact some base on the outside. Then, months after the picture was shut down, the producer put in this stupid stock footage of bombers blowing up the island at the end and shot these monotonous talking scenes of generals on the telephone that were not at all germane to the original story. As a consequence, in the final cut, we actors are playing at a level that the situation didn't call for at all! That was very, very upsetting.

== Reception ==
Film historian and critic Leonard Maltin noted his opinion on the film with a list: "1) Look at the title. 2) Examine the cast. 3) Be aware that the plot involves omnivorous trees. 4) Don't say you weren't warned". On his website Fantastic Movie Musings and Ramblings, Dave Sindelar criticized the film's poor acting, direction and script, and concluded that it "works best as inconsequential timekiller". TV Guide awarded the film 2 out of 4 stars, calling it "one of those films that is so bad you go to see it for the laughs instead of the chills". In film historian Tom Weaver's interview with Hoey, Weaver contended that The Navy vs. the Night Monsters subsequently became a "cult favorite".
