= Joy Harmon =

American actress and baker (1938–2026)

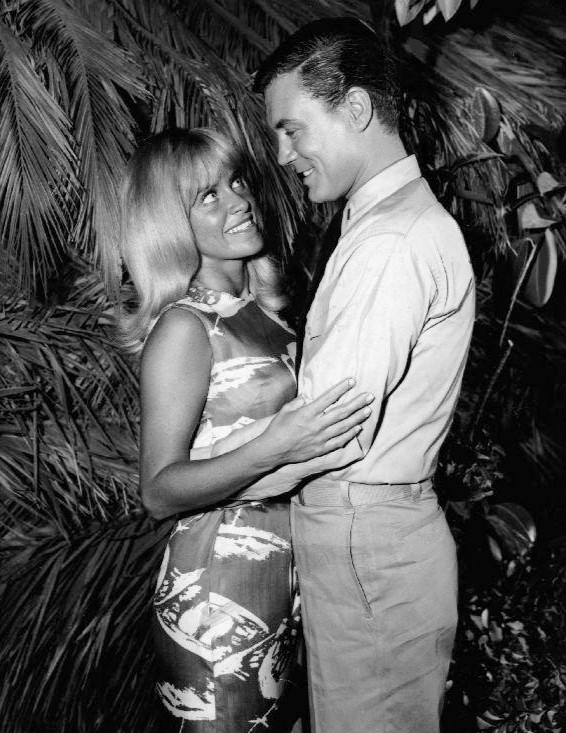
- Harmon with Roger Smith in an episode of Mister Roberts, 1965
- Born: Patricia Joy Harmon; May 1, 1938; New York City, U.S.
- Died: April 14, 2026 (aged 87); Los Angeles, California, U.S.
- Occupations: Actress; baker
- Years active: 1956–1973
- Known for: Lucille in Cool Hand Luke
- Spouse: Jeff Gourson (m. 1968; div. 2001)
- Children: 3
- Website: www.auntjoyscakes.com

Patricia Joy Harmon (May 1, 1938 – April 14, 2026) was an American actress and baker.

== Early years ==
Patricia Joy Harmon was born in Flushing, Queens, New York City, on May 1, 1938, (Note: Harmon's year of birth is often erroneously given as 1940, as she claimed to be two years younger than her real age during her career.) the daughter of Bernice and Homer Harmon. She and her family moved to Connecticut in 1946, and she tied for fourth runner-up in the 1957 competition for Miss Connecticut.

When she was three years old, Harmon modeled clothes in Fox Movietone News newsreels. She skipped two grades in elementary school and graduated from Staples High School in Westport, Connecticut in 1956.

== Career ==
Harmon's stage debut came in Pajama Tops at the Klein Memorial Theatre in Bridgeport, Connecticut. She toured the United States in stock company productions, including The Marriage-Go-Round, The Solid Gold Cadillac, The Tender Trap, The Importance of Being Earnest, and Susan Slept Here. On Broadway, Harmon portrayed Betty Phillips in Make a Million (1958). She also appeared in an off-Broadway production of Susan Slept Here (1961).

Harmon appeared as a contestant during the final season of Groucho Marx's television program You Bet Your Life (then titled The Groucho Show). She later became a regular on his follow-up series, Tell It to Groucho, where she was credited as "Patty Harmon." This pseudonym was reportedly requested by the show's sponsor, a soap manufacturer, to avoid cross-promoting a rival brand named "Joy".

She guest-starred on several 1960s TV series, including Gidget, Batman, and The Monkees. She appeared in a cameo role as blonde Ardice in the Jack Lemmon comedy Under the Yum Yum Tree in 1963. She had a role as Tony Dow's girlfriend in the 1965–66 television soap opera Never Too Young.

Harmon's stand-out acting roles include the 30-foot-tall (9 m) Merrie in 1965's Village of the Giants, where she memorably captures normal-sized Johnny Crawford and suspends him from her bikini top, and the sultry car-washing Lucille who captivates Paul Newman's chain gang in 1967's Cool Hand Luke.

Her last acting credit was a guest-starring role in the short-lived 1973 sitcom Thicker Than Water. She would eventually leave acting to focus on raising her three children.

In 2003, she established Aunt Joy's Cakes, a wholesale bakery catering to movie and TV studios, in Burbank, California. She would continue to work at this bakery until she was hospitalized with pneumonia weeks before her death.

== Personal life and death ==
Harmon was married to film editor and producer Jeff Gourson in 1968, with whom she had three children. The couple divorced in 2001. For a time, a son worked at Walt Disney Studios.

Harmon died of pneumonia while in hospice care at her Los Angeles home on April 14, 2026, at the age of 87.

== Filmography ==
=== Film roles ===
- The Man in the Gray Flannel Suit (1956) — Minor Role (uncredited)
- Let's Rock (1958) — Pickup Girl
- Mad Dog Coll (1961) — Caroline
- Under the Yum Yum Tree (1963) — Ardice (uncredited)
- Roustabout (1964) — College Girl (uncredited)
- Young Dillinger (1965) — Nelson's Girl
- One Way Wahine (1965) — Kit Williams
- The Loved One (1965) — Miss Benson (uncredited)
- Village of the Giants (1965) — Merrie
- A Guide for the Married Man (1967) — Party Girl in Bar (uncredited)
- Cool Hand Luke (1967) — Lucille, The Girl
- Angel in My Pocket (1969) — Miss Holland

=== Television roles ===
- Tell It To Groucho (1961) — Series co-host
- The Beverly Hillbillies (1963) — Kitty
- My Three Sons (1964) — Joanne Grant
- Burke's Law (1964–1965) — Barbara Sue / Belle Sue Walsh
- Gidget (1965) — Blonde Girl Dancing / Midge (uncredited)
- Batman (1966) — Julia Davis (uncredited)
- Gomer Pyle – USMC (1966) — Barbara
- Bewitched (1966) — Francie
- The Rounders (1966) — Rosetta
- Occasional Wife (1967) — Model
- That Girl (1967) — Miss Bridges
- The Monkees (1967) — Cashier in S2:E2, "The Picture Frame"
- The Monkees (1967) — Zelda in S2:E14, "Monkees on the Wheel"
- Love, American Style (1972) — Rosalie (segment "Love and the Secret Habit")
- The Odd Couple (1972) — Waitress
- Thicker Than Water (1973) — (final appearance)
