= Brain of Blood =

- Publicity poster for Brain of Blood
- Directed by: Al Adamson
- Written by: Joe Van Rodgers (screenplay); Kane W. Lynn; Samuel M. Sherman
- Produced by: Samuel M. Sherman; Al Adamson; Kane W. Lynn
- Starring: Grant Williams; Kent Taylor; John Bloom; Regina Carrol; Vicki Volante; Angelo Rossitto; Reed Hadley
- Cinematography: Louis Horvath
- Edited by: J.P. Spohn
- Production companies: Independent International Pictures; Phil-Am Enterprises Ltd.
- Distributed by: Hemisphere Pictures
- Release date: 1971
- Country: United States
- Language: English

Brain of Blood (also known as The Creature's Revenge, The Oozing Skull, and The Undying Brain) is a 1971 American horror film directed by Al Adamson and starring Grant Williams, Kent Taylor and Reed Hadley. Angelo Rossitto and John Bloom also appeared in it. It was Hadley's last film appearance before his death in 1974.

== Plot ==
Amir, the benevolent ruler of Kalid, is dying, but there is the hope of transplanting his brain into another body. Freshly deceased, he is flown to the United States where Dr. Trenton, having unwisely put off acquiring another body until the last minute, transplants Amir's brain into the body of the disfigured simpleton assistant who failed in said chore. Dr. Trenton has a few nefarious plot twists of his own in mind, and then there's the thing with the dwarf and the woman chained in the basement.

== Cast ==
- Grant Williams as Bob Negserian
- Kent Taylor as Dr. Lloyd Trenton
- John Bloom as Gor
- Regina Carrol as Tracey Wilson
- Vicki Volante as Katherine
- Angelo Rossitto as Dorro
- Reed Hadley as Amir
- Zandor Vorkov as Mohammed
- Richard Smedley as Angel
- Gus Peters as Charlie
- Margo Hope as Pale Girl
- Bruce Kimball as Jim
- Irv Saunders (billed as Ervin Saunders) as Victim

== Production ==
Brain of Blood was produced by Samuel M. Sherman, Al Adamson and Kane W. Lynn. It was written by Joe Van Rodgers (screenplay) along with Lynn and Sherman. It was filmed by cinematographer Louis Horvath and edited by J.P. Spohn.

For the brain transplant scene, the crew used animal brains purchased from a farm market.

== Cinematic Titanic ==
In 2007, Joel Hodgson created a new comedy riffing project called Cinematic Titanic. Along with other former cast members of Hodgson's former series Mystery Science Theater 3000, Hodgson riffed Brain of Blood (under the later DVD title The Oozing Skull) as their first film for the new project.

== See also ==
- List of American films of 1971
