= Michael A. Hoey =

British author and film and television writer (1934–2014)

- Born: 1934; London, England, UK
- Died: 17 August 2014 (aged 79); San Clemente, California, USA
- Occupations: Writer, director, producer, Editor
- Years active: 1960–2014

Michael A. Hoey (1934 – 17 August 2014) was a British author and film and television writer, director, and producer. He was the son of Dennis Hoey, who portrayed Inspector Lestrade in Universal's Sherlock Holmes series.

== Film and television ==
Hoey began his career in Hollywood as an editor. He later had the opportunity to write, direct and produce a number of feature films, including the teen comedy Palm Springs Weekend, the cult horror flick The Navy vs. the Night Monsters, and two movies starring Elvis Presley . Hoey then transitioned to television, where he wrote and directed a number of movies and shows, most notably during a multi-year run on the TV series Fame.

Hoey was elected to membership in the American Cinema Editors.

== Writing ==
Hoey extensively discussed his father Dennis Hoey's early life, career, marriages and death, as well as his own experiences working in film in his 2007 book Elvis, Sherlock and Me: How I Survived Growing Up in Hollywood. He also wrote about his experiences working on the TV series Fame in his 2010 book Inside Fame on Television: A Behind the Scenes History. In his third book Sherlock Holmes and the Fabulous Faces: The Universal Pictures Repertory Company (2011) he discussed the lives and careers of the many character actors and actresses who supported Basil Rathbone and Nigel Bruce in the 12 Holmes films made at Universal between 1942 and 1946.

== Personal life ==
He was a widower living in San Clemente, California, when he died on August 17, 2014. He was 79.

== Selected filmography ==
- The Legend of Mandinga (1961), Writer / Director
- Palm Springs Weekend (1963), Producer
- The Navy vs. the Night Monsters (1966), Writer / Director
- Live a Little, Love a Little (1968), Screenplay
- Stay Away, Joe (1968), Screenplay
