= George White (film editor) =

American film editor (1911–1998)

George White (August 20, 1911 – February 15, 1998) was an American film editor.

== Life and career ==
George White first became a Hollywood editor in 1942, spending most of his career at Metro-Goldwyn-Mayer.

Among his more well known efforts were the war film Bataan (1943), Vincente Minnelli’s The Clock (1945), Tay Garnett’s steamy version of The Postman Always Rings Twice (1946), the epic special effects extravaganza Green Dolphin Street (1947), for which he was nominated for an Academy Award for Film Editing, and Challenge to Lassie in 1949.

The 1950s saw him working on such films as A Life of Her Own (1950), The Naked Spur (1953), generally considered to be one of Anthony Mann’s finest Westerns, and the Biblical epic The Silver Chalice (1954), which helped launch the career of Paul Newman.

White's stock, however, waned considerably in the 1960s and he spent most of the decade working on potboilers. His last film was The Navy vs. the Night Monsters (1966), which has become something of a cult classic. He retired in 1966.

== Selected filmography ==
- One Way Wahine (1965)
- Indian Paint (1965)
