= Anthony Eisley =

American actor (1925–2003)

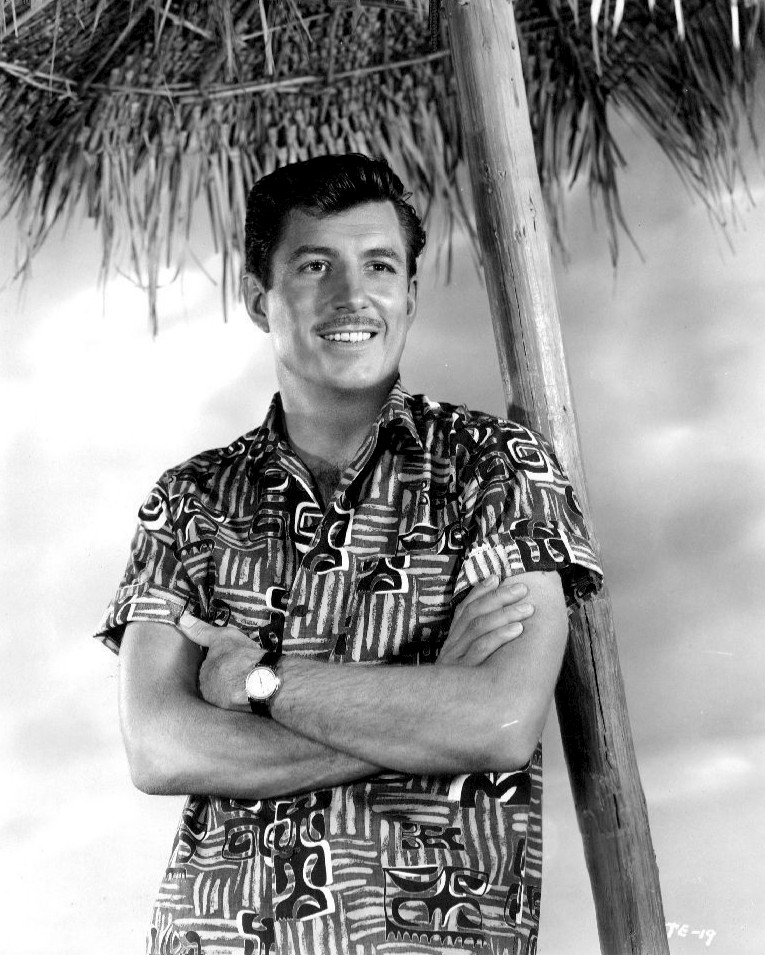
- Eisley as Tracy Steele in 1961
- Born: Frederick Glendinning Eisley; January 19, 1925; Philadelphia, Pennsylvania, U.S.
- Died: January 29, 2003 (aged 78); Woodland Hills, Los Angeles, California, U.S.
- Resting place: Forest Lawn Memorial Park (Hollywood Hills)
- Education: University of Miami
- Occupation: Actor
- Years active: 1950–1991
- Spouse: Judith Tubbs Eisley (m. 1951; died 1994)
- Children: 4, including David Glen Eisley
- Relatives: India Eisley (granddaughter)

Anthony Eisley (January 19, 1925 – January 29, 2003) was an American actor best known as one of the detective leads, Tracy Steele, in the ABC/Warner Brothers television series Hawaiian Eye. Early in his career, he was credited as Fred Eisley and later was sometimes billed as Tony Eisley.

== Biography ==
Born Frederick Glendinning Eisley in Philadelphia, Pennsylvania, his father was a general sales manager for a large corporation.

Following service in the United States Navy, he took drama classes at the University of Miami in Coral Gables, Florida.

== Stage work ==
He landed his first acting job in a Pennsylvania stock company production of A Slight Case of Murder. Eisley also acted in touring company productions of Mister Roberts, Picnic, and The Desperate Hours.

== Early career ==
His first on-screen role was as a military policeman in the 1952 movie Fearless Fagan. In 1953, he made his first appearance on television. In 1958, he was cast in the episode "The Trial" of the American Civil War drama Gray Ghost with Tod Andrews. In 1957, Eisley played Joe Foss in the episode "Jose Foss, Devilbird" of the military television series Navy Log. Eisley was in the 1959 Roger Corman film The Wasp Woman, which he described as "a hell of a lot of fun".

Eisley's big break was being discovered in a Pasadena production of Who Was That Lady?, where he was signed to a contract with Warner Bros. In the days of Tab Hunter, Ty Hardin, and Rock Hudson, Warner Bros. apparently did not want a leading man with the name of "Fred" so the studio changed his first name to "Anthony". In 1959, Eisley played Carter Henry (as Fred Eisley), The Young Philadelphians (1959).

=== Hawaiian Eye ===
Eisley won the starring role as detective Tracy Steele in the 1959–1963 television series Hawaiian Eye. After scouts saw him in the 1959 play Who Was That Lady?, Warner Bros. signed him to a contract. Eisley changed his name from Fred to Anthony at the request of the studio. Eisley had thought he would play a comedian but Warner Brothers Television placed him in a suave private eye role in Hawaiian Eye. Eisley left after the third season to be replaced by Troy Donahue as a hotel social director, Philip Barton. In the two previous seasons, Donahue had portrayed the detective Sandy Winfield II, on another ABC/WB series, Surfside 6, set on a houseboat in Miami Beach. Donahue was eleven years Eisley's junior.

When a Los Angeles Times television critic attacked Hawaiian Eye, Eisley penned a reply that was printed in the critic's column on December 7, 1960: "I too would like to see more food for thought on television. I have children whose viewpoints will be largely affected in certain areas by their many hours gazing at the one-eyed monster. But our world is solemn enough as it is. I'd hate to limit them -- or myself -- to a leisure-time diet devoid of laughter, adventure and romance."

During his Warner Brothers period, Eisley appeared in one episode of Jack Webb's Pete Kelly's Blues (1959) and in Portrait of a Mobster (1961).

=== Support of mandatory school prayer ===
In 1964, Eisley acted as master of ceremonies at a "Project Prayer" rally attended by 2,500 people at the Shrine Auditorium in Los Angeles. The gathering sought to flood the United States Congress with letters in support of mandatory school prayer following two decisions in 1962 and 1963 by the United States Supreme Court, which struck down mandatory school prayer as conflicting with the Establishment Clause of the First Amendment to the United States Constitution.

Eisley declared at the Project Prayer rally that the United States was facing "an ideological crisis. Movie stars and the stars of the entertainment world will tell you what you can do about it. Everything will be from the heart." Eisley was joined at the event by Walter Brennan, on whose series The Real McCoys he had once been a guest star, Rhonda Fleming, Lloyd Nolan, Dale Evans, Pat Boone, and Gloria Swanson. Eisley added that John Wayne, Ronald Reagan, Roy Rogers, Mary Pickford, Jane Russell, Ginger Rogers, and Pat Buttram would also have attended the rally if their schedules had not been in conflict.

Syndicated columnist Drew Pearson claimed in his "Washington Merry-Go-Round" column that Project Prayer had "backstage ties" to the anti-Communist John Birch Society. Pearson noted that the principal author of the prayer decisions, Chief Justice Earl Warren, was a Republican former Governor of California and that most mainline denominations had endorsed the Court's rulings.

=== Political views ===
Eisley supported Barry Goldwater in the 1964 United States presidential election.

== Later career ==
=== Non-Hollywood American films ===
Eisley appeared as a Soviet agent in an Armed Forces training film Espionage Target: You made in 1964. In 1965, Eisley was cast as an attorney in an anti-pornography institutional film entitled "Printed Poison"; produced by the "Citizens For Decency" movement.

=== Feature films ===
Eisley performed a memorable role in film as Griff in The Naked Kiss (1964), Sam Fuller's controversial attack on alleged American small town hypocrisy.

Eisley co-starred as character Clint Braden, suitor to the Nancy Kovack character of Nellie Bly, in the 1966 film Frankie and Johnny. He also played Ben Mitchell in the 1968 musical film Star!.

=== Television ===
Eisley guest-starred in an episode of the ABC religious drama series Going My Way and in the title role of The Outer Limits episode The Brain of Colonel Barham. He appeared three times on CBS's Perry Mason during the final three seasons of that series. In his second guest appearance in 1964 he played murder victim Vince Rome in "The Case of the Missing Button." In the same year he appeared albeit briefly in a strong Series 3 episode of Combat!, “The Gift Of Hope”.

He appeared six times in the 1967-1970 revival of Dragnet; in one segment he played a corrupt policeman and once he played an attempted murderer. During the eight-year run of ABC's The F.B.I., Eisley made 17 appearances as Special Agent in Charge Chet Randolph.

Eisley was a guest as a villain in an episode of The Wild Wild West, with his former Hawaiian Eye co-star Robert Conrad and reunited with Conrad for A Man Called Sloane.

In 1970, he guest-starred in an episode of The Silent Force. In 1973, he appeared as Ross Nelson, newscaster at Mary's Channel 8 competition, in the Season 4 episode "WJM Tries Harder" on The Mary Tyler Moore Show. He had appeared with Mary Tyler Moore years before in "The Lady and the Tiger and the Lawyer," a 1964 episode of The Dick Van Dyke Show.

=== Schlock ===
Eisley became known as a cult schlock star for his appearances in One Way Wahine (1965), Antonio Margheriti's Eurospy film Lightning Bolt (1966) and The Navy vs. the Night Monsters (1966).

He starred in David L. Hewitt's Journey to the Center of Time (1967), The Mighty Gorga (1969), and The Tormentors (1971) as well as Al Adamson's Dracula vs. Frankenstein (1971) and Ted V. Mikels's The Doll Squad (1975). He appeared in other dubious delights such as Oliver Drake's They Ran for Their Lives (1968) and The Mummy and the Curse of the Jackals (1969), The Killers (1971) alongside Cameron Mitchell, Monstroid (1980) and Fred Olen Ray's Deep Space (1988).

== Personal life ==
Eisley was married to Judith Rogers Tubbs from March 1, 1951 until her death on January 9, 1994. The couple had four children: musician David Glen Eisley, the father of India Eisley; actor and stuntman Jonathan Erickson Eisley; Nan R. Eisley, an assistant to Lawrence Kasdan; and Amanda Eisley.

== Death ==
Anthony Eisley died of heart failure on January 29, 2003, in Woodland Hills, California, at the age of 78.

== Filmography ==
Year	Title	Role	Notes
1952	Fearless Fagan	MP	Uncredited
1952	Operation Secret	Maquis	Uncredited
1957	The Gray Ghost		Episode: "The Trial"
1957	Navy Log	Joe Foss	Season 3, Episode 13; "Joe Foss, Devilbird"; credited as "Fred Eisley"
1958	Onionhead	Lt. Commander	Uncredited
1959–1963	Hawaiian Eye	Tracy Steele	Leading role
1959	Pete Kelly's Blues	Johnny Cassiano	Supporting role
1959	The Young Philadelphians	Carter Henry	
1959	The Wasp Woman	Bill Lane	
1961	Portrait of a Mobster	Legal Advisor	
1964	The Dick Van Dyke Show	Arthur Stanwyck	Season 3, Episode 16; "The Lady and the Tiger and the Lawyer"
1964	3 Nuts in Search of a Bolt	Fred	Uncredited
1964	The Naked Kiss	Griff	
1964	Espionage Target: You	Nick Macrados	Military training film
1965	One Way Wahine	Chick Lindell	
1966	Frankie and Johnny	Braden	
1966	Lightning Bolt	Lt. Harry Sennet	
1966	The Navy vs. the Night Monsters	Lt. Charles Brown	
1967	Journey to the Center of Time	Mark Manning	
1968	They Ran for Their Lives	Doc Wright	
1968	Star!	Ben Mitchell	
1969	The Witchmaker	Victor Gordon	
1969	The Mummy and the Curse of the Jackals	David Barrie	
1969	The Mighty Gorga	Mark Remington	
1969	The Virginian (TV series)	Tom Kendrick	Season 8, Episode 15; "You Can Lead a Horse to Water"
1971	Dracula vs. Frankenstein	Mike	
1971	The Tormentors	Lt. Connors	
1971	The Killers	Paul Ryan	
1973	The Doll Squad	Victor Connelly	
1974	The Mary Tyler Moore Show	Ross Nelson	Season 4, Episode 16; "WJM Tries Harder"
1975	Half a House	Jordan Blake	
1980	Monstroid	Pete	
1988	Deep Space	Dr. Rogers	
1990	Evil Spirits	Detective	
1991	Lolita al desnudo	Bryan Foster	(final film role)
