= The Brain of Colonel Barham =

- The Outer Limits episode
- Episode no.: Season 2 Episode 15
- Directed by: Charles Haas
- Story by: Sidney Ellis
- Teleplay by: Robert C. Dennis
- Cinematography by: Kenneth Peach
- Production code: 46
- Original air date: January 2, 1965

Guest appearances
- Grant Williams; Elizabeth Perry; Anthony Eisley

Episode chronology
← Previous "Counterweight"	Next → "The Premonition"

"The Brain of Colonel Barham" (original title: "The Brain of Donald Duncan") is an episode of the original The Outer Limits television show. It first aired on January 2, 1965, during the second season. The episodes reunite the two former leads of Hawaiian Eye, Grant Williams and Anthony Eisley.

== Opening narration ==
With the world growing more crowded, the great powers strive to conquer other planets. The race is on. The interplanetary sea has been charted; the first caravelle of space is being constructed. Who will get there first? Who will be the new Columbus?

== Plot ==
The space race continues as the American military strives to be the first to successfully land a man on Mars. But the best candidate for the job, Col. Barham, is dying of an incurable ailment that has left him unable to walk. There is great debate whether a human being could survive a trip to Mars and whether a computer could adapt to unforeseen circumstances. It is decided to separate the Colonel's brain from his body and keep it alive, with neural implants connecting it to visual and audio input/output for the mission combining an astronaut's brain with a computer. But without a body, the brain becomes extremely powerful and develops megalomaniacal tendencies that endanger the life of his wife and others.

== Closing narration ==
Progress goes on. One experiment fails, but even out of failure valuable lessons are learned. A way will be found, someday, somehow. It always is.

== Cast ==
- Grant Williams as Major Douglas McKinnon
- Anthony Eisley as Colonel Alec Barham
- Elizabeth Perry as Jennifer Barham
- Douglas Kennedy as General Daniel Petit
- Martin Kosleck as Dr. Leo Hausner
- Wesley Addy as Dr. Rahm
- Peter Hansen as Major Locke
- Paul Lukather as Ed Nichols
- George Robotham as Paul Lukather's stunt double
