= Black Mama White Mama =

1972 film by Eddie Romero

- Theatrical release poster
- Directed by: Eddie Romero
- Screenplay by: H.R. Christian
- Story by: Joseph Viola; Jonathan Demme
- Produced by: John Ashley; Eddie Romero
- Starring: Margaret Markov; Pam Grier; Sid Haig; Lynn Borden; Zaldy Zshornack; Laurie Burton
- Cinematography: Justo Paulino
- Edited by: Asagani V. Pastor
- Music by: Harry Betts
- Production company: Four Associates Ltd.
- Distributed by: American International Pictures
- Release date: January 19, 1973
- Running time: 87 minutes
- Countries: United States; Philippines
- Language: English
- Budget: US$200,000
- Box office: US$1 million (US and Canada rentals)

Black Mama White Mama, also known as Women in Chains (US reissue title), Hot, Hard and Mean (original 1974 UK title) and Chained Women (1977 UK reissue title), is a 1973 women in prison film directed by Eddie Romero and starring Pam Grier and Margaret Markov. The film has elements of blaxploitation.

The movie was reportedly inspired by the 1958 film The Defiant Ones. Set in an unspecified Latin American country referred to only as "the island", the movie was shot in the Philippines for budgetary purposes.

== Plot ==
Brought to a women's prison in a tropical country, Lee Daniels (Pam Grier) and Karen Brent (Margaret Markov), a prostitute and a revolutionary respectively, butt heads and cause enough trouble to warrant a transfer to a maximum-security prison. An attack by Karen's rebel friends allows them to escape, albeit chained together.

The pair struggle to evade the army, led by Captain Cruz (Eddie Garcia), who enlists the help of a gang led by Ruben (Sid Haig). Lee aims to recover the money she extorted from her former pimp, Vic Cheng (Vic Diaz), and escape by boat, while Karen intends to meet her gun connections on time to prevent them from turning on her rebel friends.

The two finally bond, despite their initial hatred for each other, until they are ultimately freed by rebel leader Ernesto (Zaldy Zshornack). Their journey culminates in a shootout involving Cheng and Ruben's henchmen, Ernesto's guerrillas, and the army. While Karen is killed in the firefight, Lee escapes on a sailing vessel.

== Cast ==
- Pam Grier as Lee Daniels
- Margaret Markov as Karen Brent
- Sid Haig as Ruben
- Lynn Borden as Matron Densmore
- Zaldy Zshornack as Ernesto
- Laurie Burton as Warden Logan
- Eddie Garcia as Captain Cruz
- Alona Alegre as Juana
- Dindo Fernando as Rocco
- Vic Diaz as Victor "Vic" Cheng
- Wendy Green as Ronda
- Lotis M. Key as Jeanette
- Alfonso Carvajal as Galindo
- Bruno Punzalan as Truck Driver
- Ricardo Herrero as Luis
- Jess Ramos as Alfredo
- Carpi Asturias as Lupe
- Andres (Andy) Centenera (uncredited) as Leonardo
- Bomber Moran (uncredited) as Vic Cheng's Goon

== Production ==
The movie was made by Four Associates Ltd., John Ashley and Eddie Romero's company. In December 1972, it was acquired by American International Pictures.

The movie takes its inspiration from the story concept of shackling a black character and a white one together introduced by The Defiant Ones (1958). John Ashley says the movie was originally called Chains of Hate and he bought the treatment from Jonathan Demme for $500.

Pam Grier, who plays Lee Daniels, had done several tropical prison films, including The Big Doll House (1971), its non-sequel follow-up The Big Bird Cage (1972), and Women in Cages (1971).

Margaret Markov, who plays Karen Brent, had appeared in The Hot Box (1972), which was also a Latin American prison film. All of these movies were shot in the Philippines in accordance with their low budgets. Pam Grier and Sid Haig also appear together in another tropical prison film The Big Doll House (1971) and Grier, Haig, Vic Diaz, and Andres Centenera appear together in its non-sequel follow-up The Big Bird Cage (1972), which were also both filmed in the Philippines. Grier and Margaret Markov also starred opposite each other in the 1974 movie The Arena (a.k.a. Naked Warriors).

The movie was made at the same time as The Twilight People.

Eddie Romero says that Sam Arkoff of AIP called him during the shoot, unhappy with the lack of coverage. Romero asked Arkoff to look at the dailies and see if there was any coverage that he thought was needed. He never heard from Arkoff again after that.

Grier became seriously ill during the making of the movie. "It was a tropical disease you get from ingestion, either from food or from the virus going through your skin in water", she said. "We were in a lot of rivers, rice paddies, where there are leeches and bacteria. So it was just a matter of time before it went through a cut and into your brain – and it could kill you." She was in bed for a month with a temperature of 105 degrees. "I lost my hair, I couldn't see, I couldn't walk. I was dying. The doctor kind of froze me to kill the cell in my brain."

Lynn Borden says she, too, fell ill during filming as well.

== Themes ==
=== Feminism and sexuality ===
James Robert Parish and George H. Hill state that Pam Grier is "an intriguing mixture of pugnacity and femininity, with a heavy dose of world-weary cynicism" despite, according to Bob McCann, the movie itself being "somewhat listless". Yvonne Sims states that "it became evident very quickly that Grier's screen presence overshadowed the one-dimensional roles that focused on her physical attributes and the weak storylines in AIP [American International Pictures] productions."

Cultural critic Nelson George notes, "Pam Grier was a cult figure who was even embraced by many feminists for her ball-breaking action movies. She remains one of the few women of any color in American film history who had vehicles developed for her that not only emphasized her physical beauty but also her ability to take retribution on men who challenged her." Therefore, "Grier...brought a new character to the screen that was instrumental in reshaping gender roles, particularly those involving action-centered storylines." (Simms)

=== Black Power ===
Black Mama White Mama was released during the middle of the Black Power era. Specifically, "1973 marked the first time that audiences saw African American women in non-servitude roles."

Lee wears her hair in an Afro. As a "Killer Dame" (along with Tamara Dobson, Teresa Graves, Jean Bell, et al.), "It was a goodbye to the headscarves worn by Mammy and the wavy hair of the Exotic Other, and a refreshing and political greeting to the woman with a natural hairstyle modeled, according to [film scholar Cedric Robinson], from civil rights heroines such as Angela Davis." Moreover, her very portrayal of an action heroine "represented the antithesis of the Mammy."

== Release ==
One advertisement for the movie included the tagline "Chicks in chains...and nothing in common but the hunger of 1,000 nights without a man!"

== Reception ==
=== Box office ===
Ashley recalls being unhappy when AIP wanted to change the title to Black Mama White Mama. "[It was] really left field. I didn't care for it. As it turned out, that was the most successful theatrical movie I have ever done, in terms of hard dollars in my pocket."

=== Critical ===
The movie, like many blaxploitation movies, was a B-movie produced on a low budget and received mixed reviews.

"So bad it's good", said the Los Angeles Times.

Variety magazine said that "Performances ranged from bad to mediocre." Josiah Howard writes in Blaxploitation Cinema: The Essential Reference Guide that the movie was "a lively and well-done women's prison yarn", but that it "somehow never really hits its mark", largely because "the filmmakers do little to distance themselves from the tired trick...of having key characters shackled together for almost the entire length of the picture." However, the pairing of Pam Grier and Margaret Markov was "a hit with audiences", as they played off each other well. Variety praised Eddie Garcia, saying that he "rises above the material by studious underplaying".

"That film wasn't half bad", reflected Romero years later. "There are scenes in there I wasn't ashamed of. But some of those "cult" films, Beyond Atlantis and The Bride of Blood Island – the worst things I ever did. Ayy!!!!... Pam Grier was the gamest actor I ever worked with. She was willing to do anything- jump off a cliff, whatever. I'd be talking to a stuntwoman and Pam would say, 'Oh I can do that.' Ha! She was very good. And Margaret Markov was very good."

== Soundtrack ==
The soundtrack received praise. Howard comments, "Harry Bett's superior ambient music soundtrack (available on CD) is much more sophisticated than the movie that it was created for."

- Main Title/Bus Ride
- Follow Me
- Day in the Oven
- Ambush
- Girls Exit Oven
- Bus Stop
- Police Check Point
- Luis' Work Shed
- Blood Hounds
- Challenge and Battle
- Ambush, Escape and Roundup
- End Credits

== Legacy ==
The movie is screened in the John Sayles film Lone Star (1996). Sayles said "Even that [movie] is about people of different races being chained together whether they want to or not."

== See also ==
- List of American films of 1973
- Blaxploitation film
