= I Escaped from Devil's Island =

1973 film by William Witney

- Theatrical release poster
- Directed by: William Witney
- Written by: Richard DeLong Adams
- Produced by: Roger and Gene Corman
- Starring: Jim Brown; Christopher George
- Cinematography: Rosalío Solano
- Edited by: Barbara Pokras; Tom Walls
- Music by: Les Baxter
- Production company: The Corman Company
- Distributed by: United Artists
- Release date: September 1973 (U.S.)
- Running time: 89 minutes
- Country: United States
- Language: English

I Escaped from Devil's Island is a 1973 exploitation film about an escape attempt from Devil's Island. Roger Corman and Gene Corman produced this grim adventure saga which was made to cash in on the release of Papillon.

== Plot summary ==
Prison life on Devil's Island is no picnic so fellow prisoners Le Bras (Jim Brown) and Davert (Christopher George) escape. Along their escape route, they encounter submissive native women and a colony of lepers.

== Cast ==
- Jim Brown as Le Bras
- Christopher George as Davert (credited as Chris George)
- Richard Ely as Joe "Jo-Jo" (credited as Rick Ely)
- James Luisi as Dazzas
- Paul Richards as Major Marteau
- Richard Rust as Sergeant Zamorra
- Bob Harris as The Barber (credited as Roland 'Bob' Harris)
- Jan Merlin as Rosenquist
- Robert Phillips as Blassier
- Stephen Whittaker as Leper Count
- Eduardo Rosas López as Sergeant Brescano
- Jonathan Dodge as Lieutenant Duplis
- Quintín Bulnes as Sergeant Grizzoni
- Gabriella Rios as Indian Girl
- Ana De Sade as Bedalia

== Production ==
Jim Brown was signed to make the film in December 1972.

Martin Scorsese says that Roger Corman offered him the chance to direct the film following Boxcar Bertha. "The idea was if you shoot it fast enough, you could release the film before Papillon," he said. "I was still very keen on genre films." However Scorsese decided to make Mean Streets instead. He says he had been talked out of doing exploitation films by his friend and colleague John Cassavetes who urged Scorsese to make something more personal. (Corman also offered Scorsese The Arena and the director turned that down as well.)

William Witney directed instead. Filming started in April 1973 in Acapulco. During filming, Witney's wife died of throat cancer.

The producers of the similar film Papillon (1973) sued for copyright infringement but were unsuccessful.

== Reception ==
Quentin Tarantino was an admirer of the film with a script that is "both entertaining and rather complex" and lead characters that "are refreshingly complicated and three dimensional" and a fresh "exploration of the societal dynamics of the community that the island prisoners exist in" in particular The Fancy Boys who "aren’t presented the way the queer population is usually depicted in novels about Alcatraz or other prison-set seventies adventures... [they] hold their own respected status inside of the island convict community without degradation. They’re respected both as individuals and as the group they represent. And are coveted objects of desire among the convict population."

== Video Release ==
Shout Factory released I Escaped from Devil's Island on DVD and Blu-ray on July 15, 2014.

== See also ==
- List of American films of 1973
