= The Twilight People =

1972 Filipino-American horror film

- Directed by: Eddie Romero
- Written by: Jerome Small; Eddie Romero
- Based on: The Island of Dr. Moreau by H.G. Wells
- Produced by: David Cohen; John Ashley; Eddie Romero; Larry Woolner; Roger Corman
- Starring: John Ashley; Pat Woodell; Jan Merlin; Pam Grier
- Cinematography: Fredy Conde
- Edited by: Ben Barcelon
- Music by: Ariston Avelino; Tito Arevalo
- Production companies: Four Associates Ltd; New World Pictures; EG Productions
- Distributed by: Dimension Pictures
- Release date: March 21, 1972
- Running time: 84 minutes
- Countries: Philippines; United States
- Language: English
- Budget: US$150,000.00

The Twilight People is a 1972 Filipino-American horror film directed by Eddie Romero. It was produced by Romero and John Ashley, and written by Romero and Jerome Small. It stars Ashley and features, in an early film appearance, Pam Grier in a supporting role.

== Plot ==
While diving, Matt Farrell (Ashley) is kidnapped by Neva Gordon (Pat Woodell) and Steinman (Jan Merlin) and taken to an island where Neva's father Dr. Gordon (Charles Macaulay) is experimenting, trying to make a "super race" by combining humans and animals. Dr. Gordon wants Farrell to be one of his upcoming experiments, but Neva begins to doubt her fathers' work following a botched experiment on another test subject and falling in love with Farrell. She decides to help Farrell and the animal people escape. Steinman and his men hunt them down.

== Cast ==
- John Ashley as Matt Farrell
- Pat Woodell as Neva Gordon
- Jan Merlin as Steinman
- Charles Macaulay as Dr. Gordon
- Pam Grier as Ayesa the Panther Woman
- Ken Metcalf as Kuzma the Antelope Man
- Tony Gosalvez as Darmo the Bat Man
- Kim Ramos as Primo the Ape Man
- Mona Morena as Lupa the Wolf Woman
- Eddie Garcia as Juan Pereira
- Angel Buenaventura as Angel

== Production ==
Director Romero had previously produced 1959's Terror Is a Man, closely based on H. G. Wells' The Island of Doctor Moreau, and returned to the same subject matter with The Twilight People, although neither film acknowledged their source material.

The film, which is also known as Island of the Twilight People, was originally made for New World Pictures, then run by Roger Corman and Lawrence Woolner. Corman, Wollner and actor/producer Ashley had previously worked together on Beast of the Yellow Night, The Big Doll House and The Woman Hunt. They came up the idea of making a new modern-day version of the Wells classic over lunch one day. Ashley said that they wrote the script and started filming one month after the initial lunch.

When Corman and Woolner decided to dissolve their partnership, Woolner took Twilight People to his new distribution company, Dimension Pictures. The film's budget was US$150,000.00. The Philippines-based production company, Four Star Associates, Ltd., was owned by Romero. The film was shot by Fredy Conde and edited by Ben Barcelon; Ariston Avelino and Tito Arevalo handled the score.

Make-up was created by Tony Arteida. "It was not time consuming," recalled Ashley. "We never seemed to be waiting for the makeup to be put on. And I remember when I first saw the film, I thought, jeez it worked better than I thought when we were doing it."

Merlin, who played one of the villains, said Ashley asked him to dye his head blonde to differentiate him from Ashley, who had brown hair. Filming took place at a studio in Manila and on location in Teresa.

Ashley considered the film to be one of his favorites, saying, "It was a lot of fun to do and there weren't a lot of problems on it."

== Release ==
The Twilight People was released in April 1972 at a runtime of 84 minutes.

== Reception ==
Playing double- and triple-bills at drive-in movie theaters, The Twilight People was a popular film. The film "did real well real quick," said Ashley.
