= Larry Manetti =

American television actor (born 1947)

- Born: Lawrence Francis Manetti; July 23, 1947 (age 79); Chicago, Illinois, U.S.
- Occupations: Actor, memoirist
- Years active: 1973–present
- Spouse(s): Nancy DeCarl Manetti (m. 1980)
- Children: 1

Lawrence Francis Manetti (born July 23, 1947), known as Larry Manetti, is an American actor known for his role as Orville Wilbur Richard "Rick" Wright on the CBS television series Magnum, P.I. He co-starred in Baa Baa Black Sheep as First Lieutenant Robert A. "Bobby" Boyle, a pilot in the VMF-214 squadron headed by Greg "Pappy" Boyington.

== Career ==
Manetti studied acting in Chicago with the Ted Liss Players. His first television role was as a young detective in Jack Webb's Chase (1973–1974). He would go on to play pilot Bobby Boyle in Baa Baa Black Sheep (1976–1978) with Robert Conrad. He followed this up with a role as a bookie on the short-lived NBC series The Duke (1979), which also featured Conrad in the title role. His signature role on Magnum, P.I. lasted for the entire eight-year run of the series (1980–1988). He also had co-starring roles in twenty-five feature films, and guest-starred on many other television shows, including The Rockford Files, Emergency!, Starsky & Hutch, Tenspeed and Brown Shoe, Fantasy Island, Battlestar Galactica, Renegade, Quantum Leap, JAG, and Walker, Texas Ranger. He also had a minor role in the 1993 film CIA II: Target Alexa.

Since July 2011, Larry and Nancy Manetti have hosted a weekly radio program on CRN Digital Talk Radio Networks.

It was announced on January 24, 2013 that Manetti had joined CBS' reboot of Hawaii Five-0 in the recurring role of Nicky "The Kid" Demarco. The character is described as "a local lounge legend ... [who], back in the day, was mentored by the one and only Frank Sinatra." In October 2019, he appeared in the reboot of Magnum P.I., playing the same character. He also reunited with Tom Selleck on Blue Bloods as troubled retired police sergeant "Sam Velucci".

== Other ==
Manetti is the author of the semi-autobiographical Aloha Magnum, based on his time on Magnum P.I. and anecdotes about fellow cast members and celebrities such as Frank Sinatra, Elvis Presley, and Michelle Pfeiffer. He used to host a "Celebrity Brunch" and once owned a restaurant in the Plaza Hotel & Casino, which was owned by his friend D. W. Barrick of Barrick Gaming Corporation.

== Books ==
- Aloha Magnum: Larry Manetti's Magnum, P.I. Memories. Manetti, Larry & Chip Silverman (1999); Los Angeles, CA: Renaissance Books; ISBN 1-58063-052-9

== Selected filmography ==
=== Film ===
Year	Title	Role
1976	Two-Minute Warning	The S.W.A.T. - Team Pratt
1977	Sudden Death	Dan
1993	Snapdragon	Lengle
1993	CIA II: Target Alexa	Radcliffe
1995	Fatal Pursuit	Gersi
1997	Top of the World	Morgan
1998	Scar City	Paul
1998	Hijack	Thomas Grady
1999	No Tomorrow	Lewis
1999	Time Served	Billy
2000	The Alternate	Agent Harris
2001	Random Acts	
2002	The Stoneman Murders	Sgt. C. "Chickie" Mudryck
2010	Sinatra Club	Peg Leg Broncato
2012	The Man Who Shook the Hand of Vicente Fernandez	

=== Television ===
Year	Title	Role	Notes
1973-1978	Emergency!	Paramedic (uncredited)/Bert Dwyer/Brian	4 episodes
1974-1976	The Streets of San Francisco	Johnny Brennan/Larry Walsh	2 episodes
1975	Starsky & Hutch	Stan	"Pilot"
1976–1978	Baa Baa Black Sheep	1st Lt. Robert A. "Bobby" Boyle	34 episodes
1978-1979	Battlestar Galactica	Lt. Giles	
1979	The Rockford Files	Larry St. Cloud	Season 6, Episode 7, "Nice Guys Finish Dead"
1979-1980	Tenspeed and Brown Shoe	Chip Vincent	
1980–1988	Magnum, P.I.	Orville "Rick" Wright/Reverend Myron Bentley	
1986	Tales from the Darkside	Junior P. Harmon	Episode: "Printer's Devil"
1993	Quantum Leap	Vic	
1993	Street Justice	Doc Nass	
1996	Renegade	Davis King	Episode: "For better, for worse"
1998	Walker, Texas Ranger	Shelby	
2007	Las Vegas	Larry	Episode: "When Life Gives You Lemon Bars"
2013–2016	Hawaii Five-0	Nicky "The Kid" DeMarco	
2019–2023	Magnum P.I.	Nicky "The Kid" DeMarco	
2023	Blue Bloods	Sam Velucci	Episode: "Family Matters"
