= The Arena (1974 film) =

1974 film by Steve Carver

- Film poster by John Solie
- Directed by: Steve Carver (Note: The Italian version credits Joe D'Amato as director, under the alias 'Michael Wotruba'. D'Amato claimed in later interviews he co-directed the film's action sequences.)
- Written by: John William Corrington; Joyce Hooper Corrington
- Produced by: Mark Damon
- Starring: Pam Grier; Margaret Markov
- Cinematography: Joe D'Amato
- Edited by: Joe Dante; Piera Bruni; Gianfranco Simoncelli
- Music by: Francesco De Masi
- Production company: New World Pictures; San Jacinto Productions; Rover Film
- Distributed by: New World Pictures (U.S.); Variety Distribution (Italy)
- Release dates: 15 January 1974 (U.S.); 27 December 1974 (Italy)
- Running time: 83 minutes
- Countries: United States; Italy
- Language: English
- Budget: $75,000

The Arena (Italian: La rivolta delle gladiatrici, lit. 'The Revolt of the Gladiatrices', also known as Naked Warriors) is a 1974 American-Italian sword-and-sandal film directed by Steve Carver in his feature directorial debut. It stars Pam Grier and Margaret Markov as female gladiators in ancient Rome, who have been enslaved and must fight for their freedom. This marks the second teaming of Grier and Markov; in 1973, they had starred together in the women-in-prison film Black Mama, White Mama.

A co-production between Roger Corman's New World Pictures and Italian company Rover Film, The Arena was shot on-location in Rome, including at Cinecittà Studios. The film's cinematographer, exploitation filmmaker Joe D'Amato, was billed as director (under the alias 'Michael Wortuba') on Italian release prints.

The film was released in the United States by New World Pictures on January 15, 1974.

== Plot ==
In the ancient Roman town of Brundisium, a group of slave girls are sold to a man named Timarchus, the organizer of the events that take place in the town’s colosseum. After a fight breaks out amongst the girls, Timarchus gets the idea of putting the women in the ring to fight to the death. The recently captured Nubian Mamawi and Gaulic Bodicia realize they must stick together if they are to survive.

== Cast ==
- Pam Grier as Mamawi
- Margaret Markov as Bodicia
- Lucretia Love as Deirdre
- Paul Muller as Lucilius
- Daniele Vargas as Timarchus
- Marie Louise Sinclair as Livia
- Maria Pia Conte as Lucinia
- Rosalba Neri as Cornelia
- Vassili Karis as Marcus
- Silvio Laurenzi as Priscium
- Mimmo Palmara as Rufinius
- Antonio Casale as Lucan
- Franco Garofalo as Aemilius
- Pietro Ceccarelli as Septimus
- Jho Jhenkins as Quintus
- Italo Gasperini as Wulfstan
- Pietro Torrisi as Gladiator
- Salvatore Baccaro as Winekeeper
- Attilio Dottesio as Courtier
- Tom Felleghy as Man at Slave Auction

== Production ==
=== Development ===
The movie was one of a series of women-in-prison films that Roger Corman co-financed following the success of The Big Doll House, including The Big Bird Cage, The Hot Box and Black Mama, White Mama. Most of those films had been shot in the Philippines but The Arena would be a European co production. Corman recalled: "It was the story of women and gladiators, based loosely on the Spartacus story. Again it was an attempt to make an R-rated film with some sex, some violence, some humor, and a political theme. The theme here was simply freedom with a women's-lib viewpoint."

Martin Scorsese said that Roger Corman offered him the film to direct following Boxcar Bertha. However he elected to make Mean Streets instead. Pam Grier was excited to make the film as it involved a trip to Italy and she had enjoyed working with Markov.

=== Filming ===
The Arena was the first feature directed by Steve Carver, who worked in post production at New World. Carver recalled: "The script had several scenes in which the girls were undressed—one of Roger's prerequisites. A clause in Pam and Maggie's contracts included full frontal nudity and precluded any discussions whatsoever." He said Federico Fellini was shooting Amarcord at the same studios and came to visit the production.

While Steve Carver is credited as the director in the American version of the film, the Italian version omits Carver and names "Michael Wotruba" as director instead. Michael Wotruba was a pseudonym then used by Joe D'Amato. D'Amato is credited in both versions as cinematographer under his birth name Aristide Massaccesi.

In an interview, D'Amato said the Italian producer Franco Gaudenzi did not trust Carver, who was sent by Roger Corman, and sent D'Amato to take care of the cinematography and help Carver if needed. According to D'Amato, Carver ended up directing the scenes with dialog, whereas he himself took care of the fight sequences in the arena.

D'Amato called the movie "a fascinating experience. I was just the director for hire on that [...] and I knew going in I wouldn't receive the proper credit. I was only listed as the director of photography on the titles. I saw it again recently on American TV. It was far better than my original version released in Italy because [Joe] Dante cut it faster."

Margaret Markov and producer Mark Damon met on the film and later married.

=== Post-production ===
Italian production standards of the time held that most films were shot MOS (without live sync-sound). As a result, all of the film's dialogue and sound effects were dubbed during post-production. As Markov and Grier were no longer available, their lines were looped by others.

Joe Dante was credited as editor for the US release of the film, but later stated he did not work on the movie. Dante said: "Jon Davison was told to dream up a bunch of phoney Anglo names to replace the original Italian credits, and he thought it would be funny to put my name in there. The real editor's name was Giuseppe something-or-other, and that gave him the idea." Most of the Italian cast and crew were credited under Anglicized pseudonyms.

== Reception ==
Kevin Thomas of The Los Angeles Times called it "one of the more perverse side effects of women's lib... Miss Grier is spirited and game, as usual. Miss Markov is as beautiful as she is untalented. Gratefully, there's much risible dubbed dialogue."

Roger Corman recalled, " The film was quite successful, particularly because by this time two of the girls we had been working with, who were really very beautiful—a white girl, Margaret Markoff, and a black girl, Pam Grier—were beginning to be well known and were emerging somewhat as stars of this kind of film."

== Remakes ==
A remake of this film was released directly to video in 2001. It was filmed in Russia by Russian director Timur Bekmambetov with a Russian crew, and it features Playboy Playmates Karen McDougal and Lisa Dergan in their feature film debuts.

== See also ==
- List of American films of 1974
- List of Italian films of 1974
- List of films featuring slavery
