= Tenspeed and Brown Shoe =

US detective/comedy TV series

- Genre: Detective fiction; Comedy
- Created by: Stephen J. Cannell
- Starring: Ben Vereen; Jeff Goldblum
- Theme music composer: Pete Carpenter; Mike Post
- Country of origin: United States
- Original language: English
- No. of seasons: 1
- No. of episodes: 14

Production
- Executive producer: Stephen J. Cannell
- Producers: Juanita Bartlett; Alex Beaton; Chuck Bowman
- Running time: approx. 50 minutes (per episode)
- Production company: Stephen J. Cannell Productions

Original release
- Network: ABC
- Release: January 27 – June 27, 1980

Related
- J.J. Starbuck

Tenspeed and Brown Shoe is an American detective comedy television series originally broadcast by the ABC network between January and June, 1980. The series was created by producer Stephen J. Cannell. Most of the show's creative staff (Cannell, Juanita Bartlett, Gordon T. Dawson) were veterans of the private detective series The Rockford Files, which concluded its run about two weeks before Tenspeed and Brown Shoe debuted.

== Plot ==
The one-hour program revolved around two private detectives who had their own detective agency in Los Angeles. E. L. (Early Leroy) "Tenspeed" Turner (Ben Vereen) is a hustler who worked as a private detective to satisfy his parole requirements. His partner Lionel "Brownshoe" Whitney (Jeff Goldblum) is an archetypal accountant, complete with button-down collars and a nagging fiancee (in the pilot episode), who had always wanted to be a 1940s-style Bogart private investigator. A running joke was his penchant for reading a series of hard-boiled crime novels, subtitled "A Mark Savage Mystery", written by Stephen J. Cannell (in-universe; Cannell wrote the quoted bits but not a real-life series of actual novels), with Goldblum reading some passages in voice-over in each episode. But Brownshoe was sharper than he seemed (albeit a little naïve) and more reasonable than his career path demanded; he had even received a black belt in karate.

== Cast ==
- Ben Vereen as E.L. Turner
- Jeff Goldblum as Lionel Whitney
- Richard Romanus as Tedesco
- Larry Manetti as Chip Vincent

== Production ==
This was the first series to come from Stephen J. Cannell Productions as an independent company. It is also the only one not to carry the famed Cannell logo on any episodes, having "A Stephen J. Cannell Production" appearing in-credit (the logo was not introduced until 1981, when The Greatest American Hero began airing).

The show had broad similarities to the later television series Simon & Simon and Moonlighting, in that it was a lightly dramatic program with many comic moments about two dissimilar detectives who attempt to solve cases together. Cannell later recycled the basic idea of Tenspeed and Brown Shoe (a crime-solver on the right side of the law working with and taking responsibility for the rehabilitation of an ex-criminal) as the successful Hardcastle and McCormick.

== Episodes ==
No.	Title	Directed by	Written by	Original release date
1	"Tenspeed and Brown Shoe: Parts 1 & 2"	E. W. Swackhamer	Stephen J. Cannell	January 27, 1980
2	"Tenspeed and Brown Shoe: Parts 1 & 2"	E. W. Swackhamer	Stephen J. Cannell	January 27, 1980
E.L. is out of prison and quickly involved in a new scam: stealing a million dollars from the Mob. Unfortunately, he's unaware that the Mob got it from fencing Nazi diamonds. Meanwhile, accountant Lionel Whitney is in town to marry his domineering fiancée, and quickly finds his plans have gone awry when Tenspeed hides the diamonds in his limousine. Both groups are now after both him and Tenspeed. Lionel finds himself being pursued by Nazis and mobsters who are after the diamonds that Tenspeed hid on him. Lionel manages to talk Tenspeed into doing the right thing by appealing to his conscience (such as it is) and running a scam to get everyone arrested. With Tenspeed out on parole and needing a job, Lionel decides to finance a new detective agency with the reward money to fulfil his lifelong dream of being a hard-boiled detective. Also starring: Larry Manetti, Robyn Douglass, Richard Romanus, Robert Webber, Jayne Meadows and Peter Brocco. Mark Savage Mystery novel: The Screaming Dead Man
3	"The Robin Tucker's Roseland Roof and Ballroom Murder"	Arnold Laven	Stephen J. Cannell	February 3, 1980
Lionel and E.L. form a detective agency and get their first case: an unidentified man who is willing to pay much money to find a woman. Also starring: Elayne Heilveil, John Pleshette, Shirley Jo Finney and Bruce M. Fischer. Mark Savage Mystery novel: Surfing and the Battered Bride
4	"Savage Says, "There's No Free Lunch""	John Patterson	Stephen J. Cannell	February 10, 1980
Lionel takes a fancy to a client who claims someone is trying to kill her and then leads Lionel and E.L. around in circles while putting killers on their trail. Also starring: Michael Fairman, Tony Burton and Janice Heiden. Mark Savage Mystery novel: Death Takes a Left Turn
5	"Savage Says, "What Are Friends For?""	Reza Badiyi	Shel Willens	March 2, 1980
Lionel and E.L. must deal with a motorcycle gang when a nervous stockbroker asks Lionel to check out two of his clients who threatened him when he asked them for needed tax information. Also starring: Martin Kove, Deborah Shelton and James Murtaugh. Mark Savage Mystery novel: The Deathward-Bound Damsel
6	"The Sixteen Byte Data Chip and the Brown-Eyed Fox"	Arnold Laven	Rudolph Bongheri	March 9, 1980
Pressure is put on Lionel and E.L. to create a phony investigation for their client: a woman looking for her missing brother who was working on a super computer. Also starring: Laurence Haddon, Dennis Burkley and Lynne Moody. Mark Savage Mystery novel: The Blonde in the Basic Black Body Bag
7	"The Millionaire's Life"	Georg Stanford Brown	Stephen J. Cannell	March 16, 1980
When E.L. uses a con to collect the rent money, he picks the wrong mark and gets himself and Lionel involved with the mob. Also starring: James Sloyan, Meeno Peluce, Deborah Adair and Floyd Levine. Mark Savage Mystery novel: The Pearl in the Clamshell Holster
8	"Savage Says, "The Most Dangerous Bird Is the Jailbird""	Reza Badiyi	Stephen J. Cannell	March 23, 1980
A mobster goes after Lionel and E.L. after they help his girl friend dump him so she can run off with a lounge singer. Also starring: Shelley Smith, Larry Manetti and Richard Dimitri. Mark Savage Mystery novel: Kiss, Kiss / Kill, Kill
9	"It's Easier to Pass an Elephant Through the Eye of a Needle Than a Bad Check in Bel Air"	Ivan Dixon	Juanita Bartlett	March 30, 1980
E.L.'s nephew's appearance is concurrent with that of thugs who are after a book which E.L. knows nothing about. Also starring: Rockne Tarkington, Dick Anthony Williams, Henry G. Sanders and Robert Alda. Mark Savage Mystery novel: Death and the Doting Dowager
10	"Loose Larry's List of Losers"	Rod Holcomb	Stephen J. Cannell	May 20, 1980
Lionel receives a hot birthday present from E.L., while E.L.'s probation officer is trying to find a way to get E.L. put back in prison. Also starring: Robert Hirschfeld, Candice Azzara, Nicolas Coster and Kenneth O'Brien. Mark Savage Mystery novel: The Bullet-Proof Professor
11	"This One's Gonna Kill Ya"	Stephen J. Cannell	Stephen J. Cannell	June 6, 1980
Someone tries to kill Lionel and E.L. after Lionel decides to solve a forty-year-old murder case involving a celebrated beauty queen. Also starring: John Anderson, James Whitmore Jr., Patricia Gaul and Lynn Herring. Mark Savage Mystery novel: Death Takes a Left-Hand Turn
12	"Untitled"	Rod Holcomb	Juanita Bartlett & Stephen J. Cannell	June 13, 1980
E.L. comes up with a get-rich-quick scheme when he learns that the Agency's cleaning lady is a descendant of the Russian royal family. (Note: "Untitled" is the episode's actual onscreen title.) Guest starring: René Auberjonois, Lesley Woods and Claude Earl Jones. Mark Savage Mystery novel: The Purloined Princess and the Poisoned Prince
13	"The Treasure of Sierra Madre Street"	Harry Winer	Gordon T. Dawson	June 20, 1980
Lionel and E.L. set out to discover if a "random" killing by a mental patient was in fact the work of a hired killer. Also starring: Michael C. Gwynne, Lynn Carlin, Anthony James and Red West. Mark Savage Mystery novel: The Case of the Avenging Widow
14	"Diamonds Aren't Forever"	Chuck Bowman	Juanita Bartlett	June 27, 1980
E.L. helps Lionel impress his visiting parents by arranging for him to gain access to a luxurious office, belonging to diamond thieves, which Lionel can claim as his own. Also starring: John Hillerman, Camilla Sparv, Simone Griffeth, Dana Wynter and Joe Spano. Mark Savage Mystery novel: Death Wears a Tam O'Shanter

== Reception ==
The show was heavily promoted by ABC at the time it premiered in late January 1980. The series attracted a substantial audience for its first few episodes (the series was the 29th-most-watched program of the 1979–80 U.S. television season, according to Nielsen ratings), but viewership dropped off substantially after that, and the series was not renewed for the 1980–81 season.

== Home media ==
On March 9, 2010, Mill Creek Entertainment released Tenspeed and Brown Shoe on DVD in Region 1 for the first time. Because CBS, which held ownership of the pilot, refused to come to an agreement on its use, MCI revealed in January 2010 that it would not be included on the DVD. However, the full-length pilot is included on the German and French DVD releases.

== Awards ==
Year	Award	Result	Category	Recipient
1981	Edgar Award	Nominated	Best Television Episode	Stephen J. Cannell (For episode "Tenspeed and Brown Shoe")

== Cross-overs ==
Ben Vereen later reprised his role as Tenspeed on five episodes of J.J. Starbuck, another Cannell production:

- "The Rise and Fall of Joe Piermont" (1988)
- "Rag Doll" (1988)
- "Permanent Hiatus" (1988)
- "A Song from the Sequel" (1988)
- "Cactus Jack's Last Call" (1988)
