= Leigh Christian =

American actress

- Occupation: Actress
- Years active: 1968–1987
- Known for: Beyond Atlantis; Butterfly; The Doll Squad; The World's Greatest Athlete

Leigh Christian is an American actress best known for her guest starring roles on many major television series during the 1970s and 1980s including The Rockford Files, Hawaii Five-O, The Six Million Dollar Man, McCloud, Knight Rider, Starsky and Hutch, The Ghost Busters, and Emergency!, amongst others. Christian also appeared in Barnaby Jones in 1975.

== Career ==
Christian began her entertainment career in Kansas City, Missouri, shooting two commercials that qualified her for a SAG card when she moved to Hollywood in 1968. She continued doing commercials throughout her career, totaling over 100 shoots.

=== Film ===
Christian had roles in Disney's The World's Greatest Athlete (1973) and two cult films: The Doll Squad (1973), directed by Ted Mikels, and Beyond Atlantis (1973), directed by the famous Filipino impresario of horror genre films, Eddie Romero. She also had a co-starring role in Butterfly (1982), the debut movie of Pia Zadora directed by Matt Cimber. Christian's role in Beyond Atlantis as Syrene, the undersea princess, earned her a place in an Australian Film Company's documentary entitled Machete Maidens Unleashed! (2010).

=== Television ===
- The Rockford Files
- McCloud
- Hawaii Five-O
- The Six Million Dollar Man
- Knight Rider
- Starsky and Hutch
- The Ghost Busters
- Barnaby Jones
- Hunter
- The Fall Guy
- T. J. Hooker
- Jessie
- Matt Houston
- Emergency!
- Sword of Justice
- Toma
- Owen Marshall: Counselor at Law
- Griff
- Flying High
- Night Gallery
- The D.A.
- Marcus Welby M.D.
- Cannon
- Chase
- Vega$
