= Smoke in the Wind =

1975 film by Joseph Kane

- Theatrical release poster
- Directed by: Andy Brennan (uncredited); Joseph Kane
- Written by: Eric Allen
- Based on: story by Eric Allen
- Produced by: Bill Hughes; Rob "Whitey" Hughes executive Jack Horton
- Starring: John Ashley; Walter Brennan
- Cinematography: Mario Tosi
- Music by: Jaime Mendoza-Nava
- Production company: Frontier Productions
- Release date: April 1, 1975
- Running time: 98 minutes
- Country: United States
- Language: English
- Budget: $200,000 or $400,000

Smoke in the Wind is a 1975 American Western film directed by Andy Brennan and Joseph Kane. It marked Walter Brennan's final film role as he died over six months before the film's release.

== Plot ==
In 1865, the American Civil War has just ended as the action in this work begins, following five Union soldiers - Pa Mondier, his two sons, and Smoky - as they return to their homes in the Ozarks of northern Arkansas, matter-of-factly planning a resumption of their pre-War existences.

However, many residents from the village of Winslow and its surrounding region are averse to offering a helping hand to Yankees, Arkansas having been a member of the Confederate States of America.

Mort Fagan leads some ex-Confederate soldiers in an attack against the former Unionists, resulting in Pa Mondier being mortally wounded, triggering a feud.

Some Winslow citizens are working to close the nation's divisiveness and it is to them that the returning veterans must look for support.

== Cast ==
- John Ashley as Whipple Mondier
- John Russell as Cagle Mondier
- Myron Healey as Mort Fagan
- Walter Brennan as H. P. Kingman
- Susan Huston as Laurie Cullen
- Linda Weld as Sarah Kimbrough
- Henry Kingi as Smoky Harjo
- Adair Jameson as Hannah Mondier
- Dan White as Col. Joab Cullen
- Lorna as Ma Mondier
- Billy Hughes, Jr. as Till Mondier
- Bill Coontz as Stapp Huckaby
- Jack Horton as Gib
- Bill McKenzie as The Bartender

== Production ==
Smoke in the Wind was filmed in Winslow, Arkansas, and local Strawberry Henson played a preacher. The General Store and most of the town was not modified for the film. The script was by Eric Allen, a journalist and Western author.

The film was made by two stuntmen turned producers, Billy and White Hughes. They were from Arkansas and White Hughes had doubled for John Ashley a number of times. Ashley says the brothers "went back to Arkansas and promoted a bunch of turkey ranchers to put up some money, I think about $400,000. They did this on the basis of them being able to deliver Walter Brennan." Ashley says Brennan agreed to make the film if his son Andy would direct. John Ashley knew the Hugheses and agreed to be in it because he wanted to work with Brennan. " I'd do it for nothing, but if I committed to it and it turned out that they didn't have him I'd walk out," said Ashley. He says they got a gaffer, Mario Tosi, to work on the film by giving him the opportunity to be cinematographer. Ashley made it shortly after Beast of the Yellow Night.

According to Ashley filming was difficult and Andy Brennan "had some personal problems. And it was not going well". The Hughes brothers replaced him with Joe Kane. Walter Brennan stayed on the film even though he was ill with emphysema at the time. Ashley says the filmmakers ran out of money after filming was completed; Whitey Hughes eventually raised the money to complete it.

"I was so impressed with Walter, said Ashley. "He hung in there. He got to know these ranchers, and they would hang out at this trailer. He had done this movie for his son, but he wouldn't walk off the movie. ... Any moment that I had, that I wasn't in front of the camera, I would go sit in his trailer and ask him questions about the old days, he was a great story teller. That's the whole reason I did the movie. I would have paid them to hang out with this guy."

Ashley later said he was not happy being billed over Brennan.

== Reception ==
The Monthly Film Bulletin called the film "lethargic".

== See also ==
- List of American films of 1975
