= Sudden Death (1977 film) =

- Directed by: Eddie Romero
- Written by: Oscar Williams
- Produced by: Caruth C. Byrd; John Williams; Eddie Romero; J. Skeet Wilson
- Starring: Robert Conrad; Don Stroud; John Ashley; Felton Perry; Thayer David; Larry Manetti; Nancy Conrad; Eddie Garcia; Ken Metcalf
- Cinematography: Justo Paulino
- Edited by: Monte Hellman
- Music by: Johnny Pate
- Production company: Caruth C. Byrd Productions
- Distributed by: Topar Films
- Release date: May 1977
- Running time: 89 minutes
- Country: United States
- Language: English
- Budget: US$250,000.00

Sudden Death is a 1977 American action film directed by Eddie Romero, starring Robert Conrad, and costarring Thayer David, Larry Manetti and Nancy Conrad, Robert Conrad's real life daughter.

== Plot ==
When Ed Neilson's (Ken Metcalf) entire family is viciously murdered, he pleads with retired CIA operative Duke Smith (Robert Conrad) to investigate. Smith refuses, but relents after Neilson too meets an explosive death.

With the aid of a former associate Wyatt Spain (Felton Perry), Smith attempts to find out who was responsible for the death of Neilson and his family. Meanwhile, a government agent, named John Shaw (John Ashley), has one of his men (Larry Manetti) follow Smith as Shaw was working with members of Neilson's company to get him out due to his sympathy for some people who are fighting for rights who call themselves "The Brown Hats".

Shaw enlists the services of hit-man Dominic Aldo (Don Stroud) from Corsica to take care of Smith. Smith has an associate, named "Buffalo" Tinker (Angelo Ventura), take his daughter Melissa (Nancy Conrad) and his wife Maya (Aline Samson) into hiding until things blow over. Aldo kills Tinker, and Smith and Spain kill the men responsible for the deaths of Neilson and his family. Smith shoots Shaw and fights Aldo, killing him. At the end, Smith and Spain go to an island only to find that Aldo had earlier killed Smith's daughter and Maya.

== Cast ==
- Robert Conrad as Duke Smith
- Don Stroud as Dominic Aldo
- Felton Perry as Wyatt Spain
- John Ashley as John Shaw
- Thayer David as Hauser
- Larry Manetti as Dan
- Chuck Courtney
- Eddie Garcia as Raoul Hidalgo
- Jess Barker as Barnett

== Production ==
The film was written for Conrad and Jim Kelly but Kelly dropped out. Conrad suggested Don Stroud and Ashley recommended Eddie Romero to direct it, "because he's not only knowledgeable, but oriented toward our end of the business over here in the U.S." said Ashley. Ashley produced the film for Caruth Byrd, who he called "a very wealthy guy from Dallas. It's actually a pretty decent little movie, but Caruth was not real knowledgable about the business. He found some fly-by- night company [Bryanston] that gave him some kind of deal, what was in his mind, a really good one. I kept saying that it's only a good deal if the picture makes money. I didn't know the company, and it didn't feel right to me."

== Reception ==
Ashley said "The picture finally came out in a very limited release, no publicity, nothing. It died and immediately went to tape. Tape then was not the big thing it is today... Bob Conrad was very upset about how Caruth threw the movie away."

== Note ==
- Lamont, John (1992). "The John Ashley Interview Part 2". Trash Compactor.
