= Pam Grier =

American actress (born 1949)

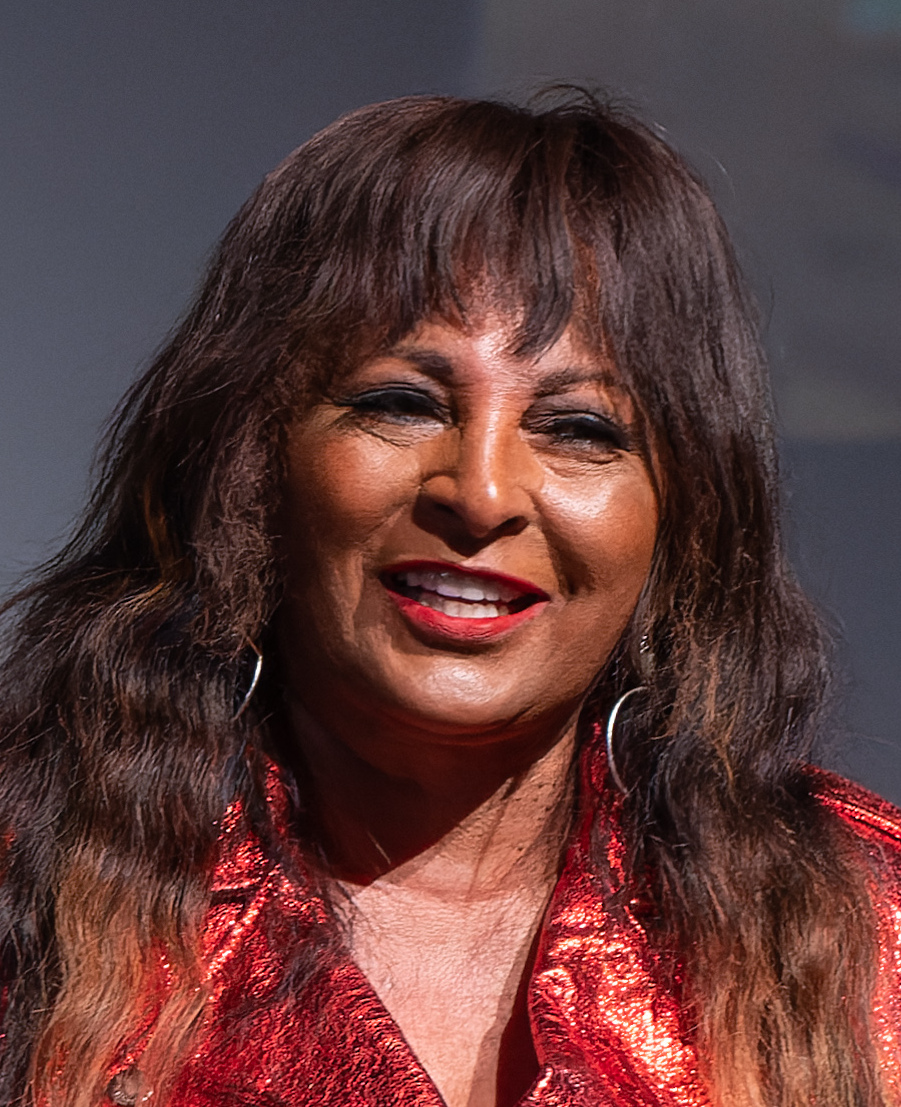
- Grier in 2022
- Born: Pamela Suzette Grier; May 26, 1949 (age 77); Winston-Salem, North Carolina, U.S.
- Education: Metropolitan State College
- Occupations: Actress; singer; martial artist
- Years active: 1970–present

Pamela Suzette Grier (born May 26, 1949) is an American actress, singer, and martial artist. She achieved fame for her starring roles in a string of 1970s action, blaxploitation and women-in-prison films for American International Pictures and New World Pictures. Her accolades include nominations for an Emmy Award, a Golden Globe Award, a Screen Actors Guild Award, a Satellite Award and a Saturn Award.

Grier came to prominence with her titular roles in the films Coffy (1973) and Foxy Brown (1974); her other major films during this period included The Big Doll House (1971), Women in Cages (1971), The Big Bird Cage (1972), Black Mama White Mama (1973), Scream Blacula Scream (1973), The Arena (1974), Sheba, Baby (1975), Bucktown (1975) and Friday Foster (1975). She also played alongside Richard Pryor as his character Wendell Scott’s wife in the film Greased Lightning (1977). She portrayed the title character in Tarantino's crime film Jackie Brown (1997), nearly three decades after her first starring role. Grier also appeared in Escape from L.A. (1996), Mars Attacks! (1996), Jawbreaker (1999), Holy Smoke! (1999), Snow Day (2000), Bones (2001), Just Wright (2010), Larry Crowne (2011) and Poms (2019).

On television, Grier portrayed Eleanor Winthrop in the Showtime comedy-drama series Linc's (1998–2000), Kate "Kit" Porter on the Showtime drama series The L Word (2004–2009), and Constance Terry in the ABC sitcom Bless This Mess (2019–2020). She received praise for her work in the animated series Happily Ever After: Fairy Tales for Every Child (1999).

In 2016, IndieWire named Grier one of the best actors never to have received an Academy Award nomination.

== Early life ==
Grier was born on May 26, 1949, in Winston-Salem, North Carolina, the daughter of Gwendolyn Sylvia Davis, a homemaker and nurse, and Clarence Ransom Grier Jr., who worked as a mechanic and technical sergeant in the United States Air Force. She has one sister and one brother. Grier said she is of Black, Hispanic, Chinese, Filipino, and Cheyenne heritage. She was raised Catholic and later baptized as a Methodist.

Because of her father's military career, the family moved frequently during Grier's childhood. In 1956, they moved to Swindon, England, where her father worked on an air force base. By Grier's account, hers was one of the only Black families in town, though she recalled that they faced no racism or segregation compared to that in the United States: "They didn't care that I was Black since they hadn't been raised to hate Blacks. Instead, they'd been raised to hate Germans... In the U.S., especially in the South, we were never able to get buses to stop for us, we couldn't eat in certain restaurants, couldn't use certain bathrooms. Up until 1969, there were department stores in which my father and I weren't even allowed to try on clothing."

The family returned to the United States in 1958, when Grier's father was transferred to California's Travis Air Force Base, eventually settling in Denver, near Lowry Air Force Base. Grier spent part of her upbringing on her maternal grandparents' sugar beet farm in rural Wyoming, where their ancestors had homesteaded after fleeing west via the Underground Railroad to escape slavery. Grier attended East High School in Denver, and appeared in a number of stage productions, as well as participating in beauty contests to raise money for college tuition at Metropolitan State College.

== Career ==
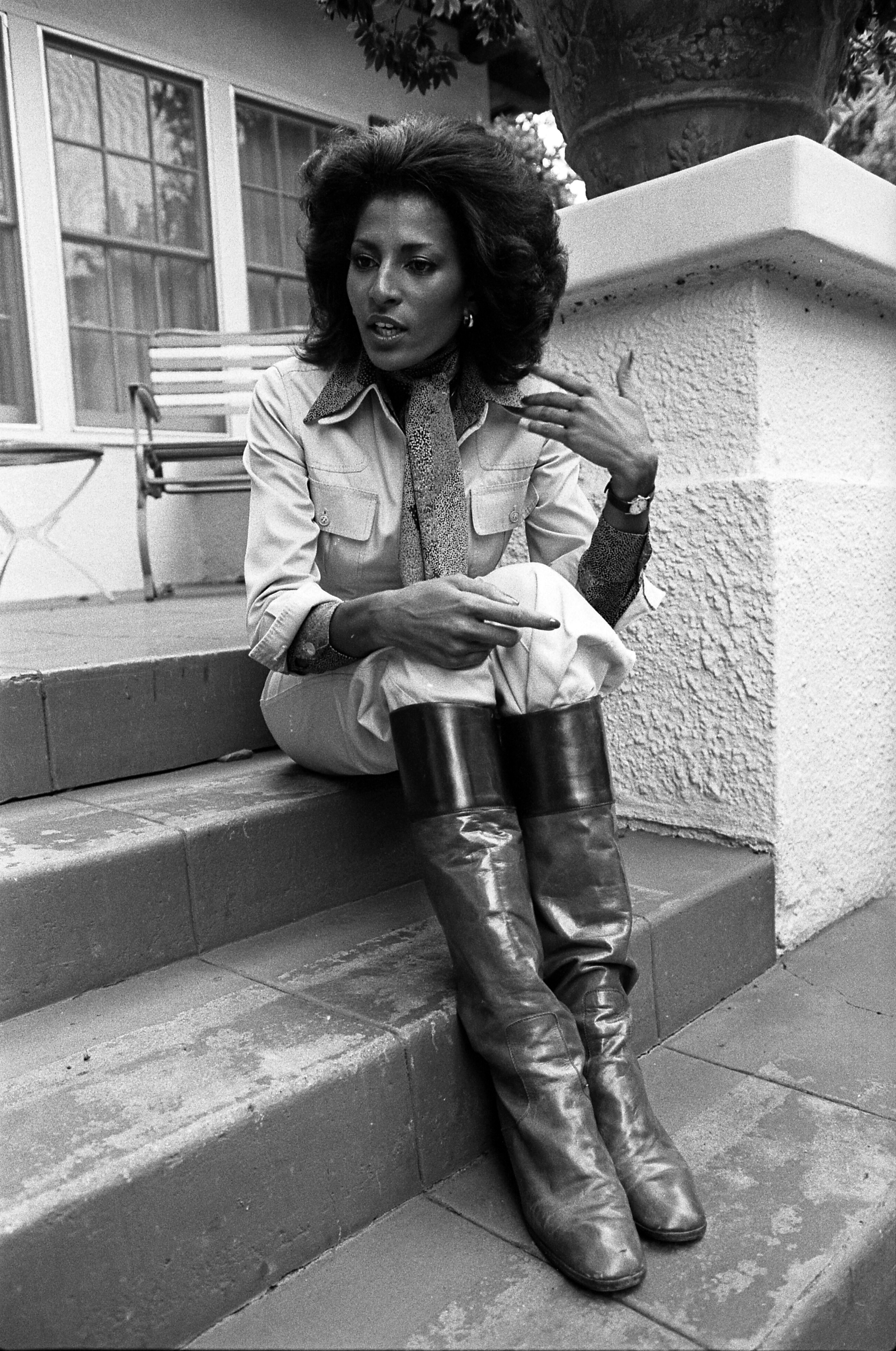
Grier in 1976

Grier moved to Los Angeles, in 1967, where she was initially hired to work the switchboard at American International Pictures (AIP). She is believed to have been discovered by the director Jack Hill, and was cast in Roger Corman women-in-prison films such as The Big Doll House (1971), Women in Cages (1971) and The Big Bird Cage (1972). While under contract at AIP, she became a staple of early 1970s blaxploitation films, playing bold, assertive women, beginning with Hill's Coffy (1973), in which she plays a nurse who seeks revenge on drug dealers. Her character was advertised in the trailer as the "baddest one-chick hit-squad that ever hit town!".

The film, which was filled with sexual and violent elements typical of the genre, was a box-office hit. Grier is considered the first African-American woman to headline an action film, as protagonists of previous blaxploitation films were men. In his review of Coffy, critic Roger Ebert of The Chicago Sun-Times praised the film for its believable female lead. He noted Grier was an actress of "beautiful face and astonishing form" and she possessed a kind of "physical life" missing from many other attractive actresses. Ebert thought highly of Grier in general during this era, saying in his review for Sheba, Baby how she brought "a sense of boundless energy" to her roles even in mediocre productions, was well-suited to action films and also showed some comic talent, and "seems to be having fun, and the characters she plays seem more athletic, more active, than a lot of the action roles played by aging male superstars."

Grier played similar characters in the AIP films Foxy Brown (1974), Sheba, Baby and Friday Foster (both 1975). With the demise of blaxploitation later in the 1970s, Grier appeared in smaller roles for many years. She acquired progressively larger character roles in the 1980s, including a drug addicted prostitute in Fort Apache, The Bronx (1981), and a menacing witch in Something Wicked this Way Comes (1983). In 1985, Grier made her theatrical debut in Sam Shepard's Fool for Love at the Los Angeles Theatre Center.

Grier returned to film as Steven Seagal's detective partner in Above the Law (1988). She had a recurring role on Miami Vice from 1985 to 1989, and made guest appearances on Martin, Night Court and The Fresh Prince of Bel Air. She had a recurring role in the TV series Crime Story, between 1986 and 1988. Her role in Rocket Gibraltar (1988) was cut due (according to Grier) to fears by the film's director, Daniel Petrie, of "repercussions from interracial love scenes". She appeared on Sinbad, Preston Chronicles, The Cosby Show, The Wayans Bros., and Mad TV. In 1994, Grier appeared in Snoop Dogg's video for "Doggy Dogg World".

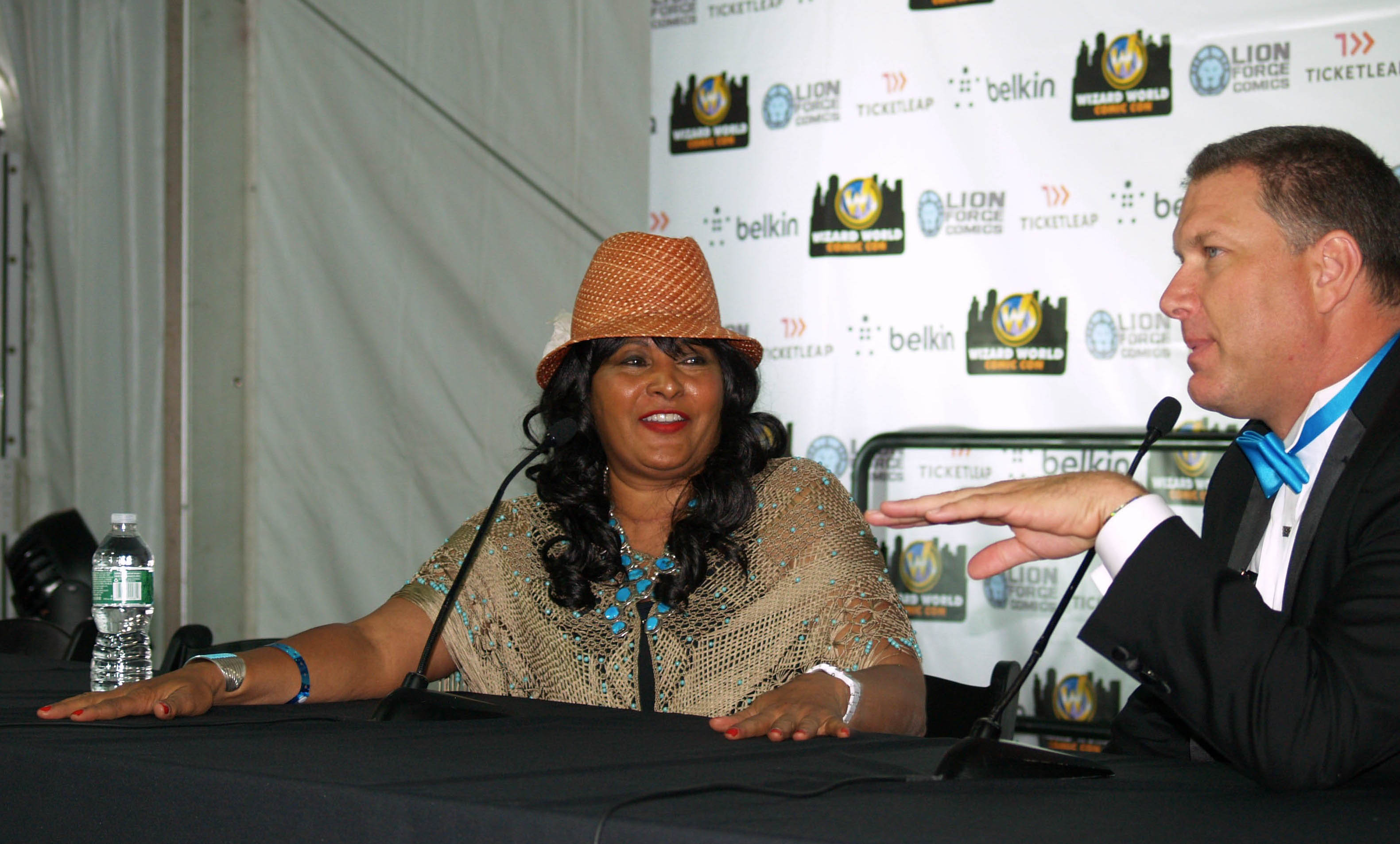
Grier with moderator Jarrett Crippen during a Q&A session at the 2013 Wizard World New York Experience

In the late 1990s, Grier was a cast member of the Showtime series Linc's. She appeared in 1996 in John Carpenter's Escape from L.A. and 1997 with the title role in Quentin Tarantino's Jackie Brown, films that partly paid homage to her 1970s blaxploitation films. She was nominated for numerous awards for her work in the Tarantino film. Grier appeared on Showtime's The L Word, in which she played Kit Porter. The series ran for six seasons and ended in March 2009. Grier occasionally guest-stars in such television series as Law & Order: Special Victims Unit (where she is a recurring character).

In 2010, Grier began appearing in a recurring role on the hit science-fiction series Smallville as the villain Amanda Waller, also known as White Queen, head agent of Checkmate, a covert operations agency. She appeared as a friend and colleague to Julia Roberts' college professor in 2011's Larry Crowne.

In 2010, Grier wrote her memoir, Foxy: My Life in Three Acts, with Andrea Cagan.

Grier received an honorary Doctorate of Humane Letters from the University of Maryland Eastern Shore in 2011. That same year, she received an honorary Doctorate of Science from Langston University.

Essence magazine wrote in 2012,"So revolutionary were the characters Grier played that women reportedly would stand on chairs and cheer".

Grier founded the Pam Grier Community Garden and Education Center with the National Multicultural Western Heritage Museum. The purpose is to teach people about organic gardening, health, and nutrition among other things. The museum named its first garden in honor of Grier in 2011.

In January 2018, Grier said that a biopic based on her memoir is in the works, entitled Pam.

In April 2022, Turner Classic Movies (TCM) announced the fourth season of their podcast, The Plot Thickens, would focus on Grier's life and career.

== Personal life ==
Grier met basketball player Ferdinand Lewis (Lew) Alcindor in 1969. Early in their relationship, he converted to Islam and changed his name to Kareem Abdul-Jabbar. Abdul-Jabbar proposed to Grier on the condition that she immediately convert as well. Grier refused, and he married a different woman that day.

Grier met the comedian Freddie Prinze while promoting her film Coffy in 1973. They began a relationship and considered marriage. Prinze wanted her to have his baby, but she was reluctant due to his history of depression and drug addiction. They remained in touch after their break-up. She was one of the last people Prinze spoke to before he died in 1977.

Grier met the comedian Richard Pryor through her relationship with Prinze; they began dating after they were both cast in 1977's Greased Lightning. She helped Pryor learn to read and tried to extricate him from drug abuse. After six months of sobriety, he relapsed. In her memoir, Grier described how her sexual relationship with Pryor caused cocaine to enter her system. Grier confronted Pryor about protecting her health, but he refused to use a condom. Pryor married Deborah McGuire while dating Grier in 1977.

Grier was formerly romantically linked to Jimmie "Big Wheel" Wheeler, a famous boxing promoter, and Soul Train host Don Cornelius. In 1998, Grier was engaged to RCA Records executive Kevin Evans, but the engagement ended in 1999.

Grier was diagnosed with stage four cervical cancer in 1988, and was told she had 18 months to live. Through vigorous treatment, she recovered and has since been in remission.

Grier lives on a ranch in Santa Fe, New Mexico.

Although she is close with actor and Protestant minister Rosey Grier, she denies the rumor that they are related.

During a 2026 appearance on The View, Grier claimed to have seen lynched bodies during her childhood in Columbus, Ohio. These comments stirred controversy, as America's Black Holocaust Museum reports that the final recorded lynching in Ohio took place in 1911, decades before Grier's birth.

== Honors and awards ==
For her culture-shaping effect of cultural contributions made throughout her career, Grier was recognized with a lifetime achievement award at the 2024 Toronto Black Film Festival.

For Valentine's Day 2024, Tarantino paid homage to Grier with the opening of a Los Feliz coffee shop, carrying the namesake of the 1973 American-culture-shaping character she famously portrayed in Coffy.

In August 2026, Grier was announced as the keynote speaker for the fifth annual Canada’s Supporting Women in Film Trades (SWIFT) Conference, organized by Film Training Manitoba in Winnipeg. SWIFT is the only annual conference in the world dedicated to advancing women-identifying and gender-diverse individuals in film trades and technical roles through a gender-equity lens. The conference, is scheduled for October 24, 2026, at the University of Winnipeg, and Film Training Manitoba’s Executive Director Adam Smoluk said of Grier’s selection, “We are incredibly honoured to welcome a legendary artist whose career continues to inspire women to pursue leadership, technical excellence, and lasting success.”

== Filmography ==
=== Film ===
Year	Title	Role	Notes	Ref.
1970	Beyond the Valley of the Dolls	Partygoer		
1971	The Big Doll House	Grear		
1971	Women in Cages	Alabama		
1972	The Twilight People	Ayesa		
1972	Cool Breeze	Mona		
1972	The Big Bird Cage	Blossom		
1972	Hit Man	Gozelda		
1973	Black Mama White Mama	Lee Daniels		
1973	Coffy	Nurse Flower Child 'Coffy' Coffin		
1973	Scream Blacula Scream	Lisa Fortier		
1974	The Arena	Mamawi		
1974	Foxy Brown	Foxy Brown		
1975	Sheba, Baby	Sheba Shayne		
1975	Bucktown	Aretha		
1975	Friday Foster	Friday Foster		
1976	Drum	Regine		
1977	Twilight of Love	Sandra		
1977	Greased Lightning	Mary Jones		
1981	Fort Apache, The Bronx	Charlotte		
1983	Tough Enough	Myra		
1983	Something Wicked This Way Comes	Dust Witch		
1985	Stand Alone	Cathryn Bolan		
1986	The Vindicator	Hunter		
1986	On the Edge	Cora		
1987	The Allnighter	Sgt. McLeesh		
1988	Above the Law	Detective Delores 'Jacks' Jackson		
1989	The Package	Ruth Butler		
1990	Class of 1999	Ms. Connors		
1991	Bill & Ted's Bogus Journey	Ms. Wardroe		
1993	Posse	Phoebe		
1996	Original Gangstas	Laurie Thompson		
1996	Escape from L.A.	Jack 'Carjack' Malone / Hershe Las Palmas		
1996	Mars Attacks!	Louise Williams		
1997	Strip Search	Janette		
1997	Fakin' da Funk	Annabelle Lee		
1997	Jackie Brown	Jackie Brown		
1999	Jawbreaker	Det. Vera Cruz		
1999	No Tomorrow	Diane		
1999	In Too Deep	Det. Angela Wilson		
1999	Holy Smoke!	Carol		
2000	Snow Day	Tina		
2000	Fortress 2: Re-Entry	Susan Mendenhall		
2000	Wilder	Detective Della Wilder		
2001	3 A.M.	George		
2001	Love the Hard Way	Linda		
2001	Ghosts of Mars	Commander Helena Braddock		
2001	Bones	Pearl		
2002	The Adventures of Pluto Nash	Flura Nash		
2002	Baby of the Family	Mrs. Williams		
2005	Back in the Day	Mrs. Cooper		
2010	Just Wright	Janice Wright		
2010	The Invited	Zelda		
2010	Machete Maidens Unleashed!	Herself	Documentary	
2011	Larry Crowne	Frances		
2011	Corman's World: Exploits of a Hollywood Rebel	Herself	Documentary	
2012	Woman Thou Art Loosed: On the 7th Day	Detective Barrick		
2012	The Man with the Iron Fists	Jane		
2012	Mafia	James Womack		
2017	Bad Grandmas	Coralee		
2017	Being Rose	Lily		
2019	Poms	Olive		
2023	As We Know It	Ms. Jones		
2023	Cinnamon	Mama		
2023	Pet Sematary: Bloodlines	Majorie Washburn		

=== Television ===
Year	Title	Role	Notes
1979	Roots: The Next Generations	Francey	Episode: "Part IV (1917–1921)"
1980	The Love Boat	Cynthia Wilbur	Episode: "Kinfolk / Sis & the Slicker / Moonlight & Moonshine / Too Close for Comfort / The Affair: Part 1 & 2"
1985	Badge of the Assassin	Alexandra Horn	Television film
1985–1989	Miami Vice	Valerie Gordon	Recurring cast (season 1–2, 5); 3 episodes
1986	Night Court	Benet Collins	Episode: "Hurricane: Part 1 & 2"
1986–1988	Crime Story	Suzanne Terry	Recurring cast
1987	The Cosby Show	Samantha	Episode: "Planning Parenthood"
1988	Frank's Place	Neema Sharone	Episode: "Frank's Place – The Movie"
1989	Midnight Caller	Susan Province	Episode: "Blood Red"
1990	Knots Landing	Lieutenant Guthrie	Recurring cast (season 12)
1991	Monsters	Matilde	Episode: "Hostile Takeover"
1992	Pacific Station	Grace Ballard	Episode: "My Favorite Dad"
1992	A Mother's Right: The Elizabeth Morgan Story	Linda Holman	Television film
1994	In Living Color	Herself	Episode: "Mrs. Ikefire"
1994	The Sinbad Show	Lynn Montgomery	Episode: "The Telethon"
1994	The Fresh Prince of Bel-Air	Janice Robertson	Episode: "M is for the Many Things She Gave Me"
1995	The Marshal	Marshal Vanetta Brown	Episode: "Rainbow Comix"
1995	Martin	Herself	Episode: "All the Players Came"
1996	Sparks	Ms. Grayson	Episode: "Pillow Talk"
1996	The Wayans Bros.	Erica	Episode: "Goin' to the Net"
1998	Mad TV	Host	Episode: "#3.25"
1998	Pinky and the Brain	Julie Auburn	Voice, episode: "Inherit the Wheeze"
1998	Family Blessings	Mrs. Quincy	Television film
1998–2000	Linc's	Eleanor Winthrop	Main cast
1999	The Wild Thornberrys	Mother Springbok	Voice, episode: "Stick Your Neck Out"
1999	Happily Ever After: Fairy Tales for Every Child	The Empress' Nightingale	Voice, episode: "The Empress' Nightingale"
1999	Hayley Wagner, Star	Sam	Television film
1999	For Your Love	Brenda	Episode: "The Sins of the Mother and... the Boyfriend"
2001	Strange Frequency		Episode: "Time Is on My Side"
2001	The Feast of All Saints	Suzzette Lermontant	Television film
2002	Night Visions	Dr. Lewis	Episode: "Switch"
2002	Justice League	My'ria'h	Voice, episodes: "A Knight of Shadows" and "A Knight of Shadows: Part II"
2002–2003	Law & Order: Special Victims Unit	Asst. US Attorney Claudia Williams	2 episodes
2003	First to Die	Claire Washburn	Television film
2004–2009	The L Word	Kit Porter	Main cast (70 episodes)
2008	Ladies of the House	Roberta "Birdie" Marchand	Television film
2010	Smallville	Amanda Waller	3 episodes (season 9)
2015	Cleveland Abduction	Nurse Carla	Television film
2018–2019	This Is Us	Grandma	2 episodes
2019	A Christmas Wish	Mary	Television film
2019–2020	Bless This Mess	Constance Terry	Main cast (26 episodes)
2022	The Great North	Neckbone	Voice, episode: "Slide & Wet-Judice Adventure"
2024	Them	Athena Reeve	Main cast (8 episodes)
2024	Bob's Burgers	Evelyn	Voice, episode: "Saving Favorite Drive-In"
2024	Mystery Cuddlers	Junebug	Voice (Pilot)

=== Video games ===
Year	Title	Role	Notes
2013	Grand Theft Auto V	Herself	DJ on in-game radio station 'The Lowdown 91.1'
2017	Call of Duty: Infinite Warfare	Herself	"Shaolin Shuffle" DLC

=== Music videos ===
Year	Title	Artist	Role	Notes
1994	"Doggy Dogg World"	Snoop Dogg	Foxy Brown	

== Discography ==
- "Long Time Woman" (1971, from the film The Big Doll House)
- Communication by Bobby Womack (1971, backing vocals)
- Understanding by Bobby Womack (1972, backing vocals)

== Bibliography ==
- 2010: Foxy: My Life in Three Acts (ISBN 9780446548502).

== Accolades ==
=== Awards ===
- 1998: San Diego Film Critics Society Award for Best Actress – Jackie Brown
- 1999: Acapulco Black Film Festival Career Achievement Award
- 2000: Csapnivalo Award for Best Female Performance – Jackie Brown
- 2001: High Falls Film Festival Susan B. Anthony 'Failure is Impossible' Award
- 2003: Special Achievement in Film Trumpet Award
- 2008: RiverRun International Film Festival Master of Cinema Award
- 2012: National Multicultural Western Heritage Museum.
- 2018: 20/20 Award for Best Actress – Jackie Brown
- 2018: Catalonian International Film Festival Time-Machine Honorary Award
- 2018: Tallgrass International Film Festival Ad Astra Award

=== Nominations ===
- 1997: Awards Circuit Community Award for Best Actress in a Leading Role – Jackie Brown
- 1998: Chicago Film Critics Association Award for Best Actress – Jackie Brown
- 1998: Empire Award for Best Actress – Jackie Brown
- 1998: Golden Globe Award for Best Actress – Motion Picture Musical or Comedy – Jackie Brown
- 1998: NAACP Image Award for Outstanding Actress in a Motion Picture – Jackie Brown
- 1998: Online Film & Television Association for Best Drama Actress – Jackie Brown
- 1998: Satellite Award for Best Actress – Motion Picture Musical or Comedy – Jackie Brown
- 1998: Saturn Award for Best Actress – Jackie Brown
- 1998: Screen Actors Guild Award for Outstanding Performance by a Female Actor in a Leading Role – Jackie Brown
- 1999: NAACP Image Award for Outstanding Actress in a Comedy Series – Linc's
- 2000: NAACP Image Award for Outstanding Actress in a Comedy Series – Linc's
- 2000: Daytime Emmy Award for Outstanding Performer in an Animated Program – Happily Ever After: Fairy Tales for Every Child
- 2002: Black Reel Award for Best Actress in a Motion Picture – Bones
- 2002: NAACP Image Award for Outstanding Actress in a Television Movie, Mini-Series or Dramatic Special – 3 A.M.
- 2002: Black Reel Award for Best Actress in Network/Cable Series – 3 A.M.
- 2003: NAACP Image Award for Outstanding Supporting Actress in a Drama Series – Law & Order: Special Victims Unit
- 2004: NAACP Image Award for Outstanding Supporting Actress in a Drama Series – Law & Order: Special Victims Unit
- 2005: NAACP Image Award for Outstanding Supporting Actress in a Drama Series – The L Word
- 2006: NAACP Image Award for Outstanding Supporting Actress in a Drama Series – The L Word
- 2008: NAACP Image Award for Outstanding Supporting Actress in a Drama Series – The L Word
