= Roberta Collins =

American actress (1944–2008)

- Born: Roberta Lee Hefley; November 17, 1944; Alhambra, California, U.S.
- Died: August 16, 2008 (aged 63); Los Angeles, California, U.S.
- Occupation: Actress
- Years active: 1969–1986

Roberta Collins (born Roberta Lee Hefley, November 17, 1944 – August 16, 2008) was a film and television actress who was known for her attractive physique, blonde, curly hair, and Marilyn Monroe appearance. She starred in many exploitation films, including the prostitute Clara in Tobe Hooper's Eaten Alive and Matilda the Hun in the science-fiction film Death Race 2000.

Jack Hill, who directed her in The Big Doll House, said of her, "I think she could have had a great career, but she couldn't get her personal life together ... she would be fantastic one day, do everything right, and then she would be out until 4 am partying and the next day she would be useless."

== Career ==
Collins was signed to a contract with a studio almost immediately after graduation from high school. Her option was not picked up, though, something that was repeated with another studio, "so that made me want to study and become a good actress," she later said.

In 1969, she was appointed queen of the Warner Bros-Seven Arts International Film Festival in Freeport, Grand Bahamas Island. She appeared in The Big Doll House. This led to a series of roles in exploitation films. She worked in a number of non-exploitation roles, as well, notably on television. One notable non-exploitation movie role Collins played was 1930s movie actress Jean Harlow in the 1975 pop musical Train Ride to Hollywood, starring the R&B band Bloodstone. In that movie, Bloodstone singer Harry Williams has a dream of being on a Los Angeles-bound train with his bandmates and several iconic actors and characters from Hollywood's early Golden Age.

In the early 1970s, Collins attended an event with Glenn Ford. In the early 1990s, she reportedly worked as a caregiver for Ford.

== Death ==
Collins died August 16, 2008, from a reportedly accidental overdose of a cocktail of drugs and alcohol. Her son predeceased her. She is buried at the Forest Lawn Memorial Park (Hollywood Hills).

== Legacy ==
In 2014, a tribute to Collins was part of the St. Louis International Film Festival. Caged Heat was screened a concert was held where Stace England and the Screen Syndicate played an album of songs inspired by Roberta Collins. Stace England and the Screen Syndicate released the album, Roberta Stars in the Big Doll House, in 2022, and the LP was made available as a YouTube playlist and on streaming sites.

In 1998, ten years before her death, Collins said that she hoped to play a role in a mainstream movie and put her B-movie-queen reputation behind. “I’d like to play a real woman who has many colors. She’s not just this way at this time and that way at another. She is, above all, feminine. She’s approachable, funny, serious, curious, dominant, submissive all at the same time," she said, adding, "As far as acting, I want to do something that makes a statement.”

== Partial filmography ==
- Lord Love a Duck (1966) – Brunette high school classmate (uncredited)
- Adam-12 (1969, TV Series, episode "Log 153: Find Me a Needle") – Sally
- Here Come the Brides (1970, TV Series, episode "Pat's Girl") – Pat's girl
- The Bob Hope Specials (1970)
- The Big Doll House (1971) – Alcott
- Women in Cages (1971) – Stoke
- Cade's County (1971, TV Series, episode "Requiem for Miss Madrid") – Karen Malloy
- Minnie and Moskowitz (1971) – Countergirl at Pink's Hot Dogs (uncredited)
- Sweet Kill (1972) – Call girl
- Unholy Rollers (1972) – Jennifer
- The Roommates (1973) – Beth
- Wonder Women (1973) – Laura
- The Last Porno Flick (1974)
- Caged Heat (1974) – Belle Tyson
- Three the Hard Way (1974) – Lait's secretary
- Movin' On (1974, TV series, episode "The Time of His Life") – Lucille
- Kolchak: The Night Stalker (1974, TV series, episode "The Ripper") – Det. Cortazzo
- The Rockford Files (1974, TV Series, episode "Exit Prentiss Carr") – Nancy Hellman
- Alias Big Cherry (1975)
- Death Race 2000 (1975) – Matilda the Hun
- Train Ride to Hollywood (1975) – Jean Harlow
- The Witch Who Came from the Sea (1976) – Clarissa
- Eaten Alive (1976) – Clara
- Whiskey Mountain (1977) – Diana
- Speedtrap (1977) – Ms. Hastings, student driver
- 79 Park Avenue (1977, TV Mini-Series) – Lola
- Matilda (1978) – Tanya Six
- B. J. and the Bear (1979, episode "Shine On") – Ellen Smith
- Saturday the 14th (1981) – Cousin Rhonda
- Death Wish II (1982) – Woman at party
- Hardbodies (1984) – Lana
- School Spirit (1985) – Helen Grimshaw
- Hardbodies 2 (1986) – Lana Logan
- Vendetta (1986) – Miss Dice (final film role)
