= Pat Woodell =

American actress (1944–2015)

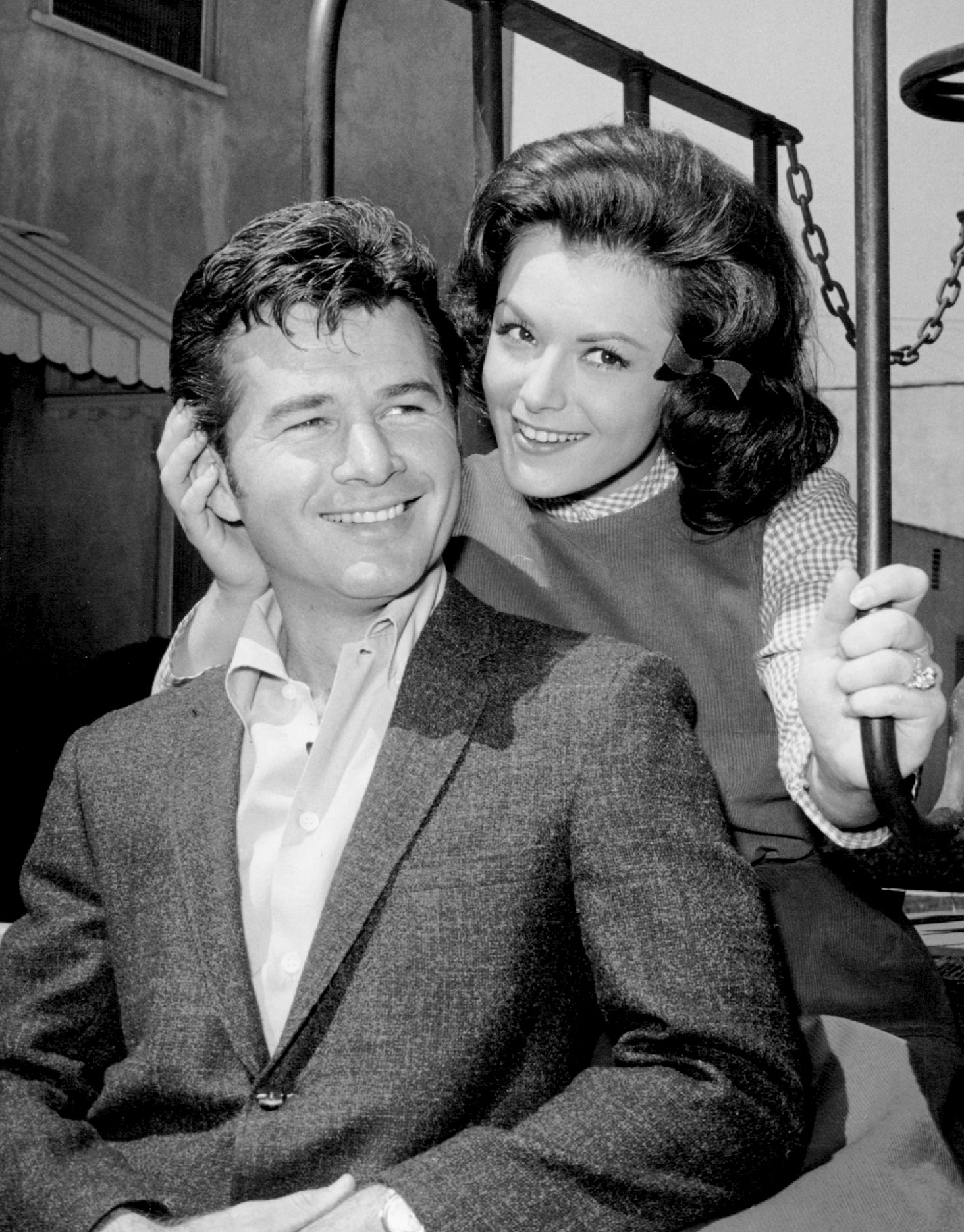
- Woodell and Gary Clarke, 1964.
- Born: Patricia Joy Woodell; July 12, 1944; Winthrop, Massachusetts, U.S.
- Died: September 29, 2015 (aged 71); Fallbrook, California, U.S.
- Occupation: Actress/Singer
- Years active: 1962–1973
- Known for: Petticoat Junction
- Spouses: Gary Clarke (m. 1964; div. 1977) Vern McDade (m. 1978)

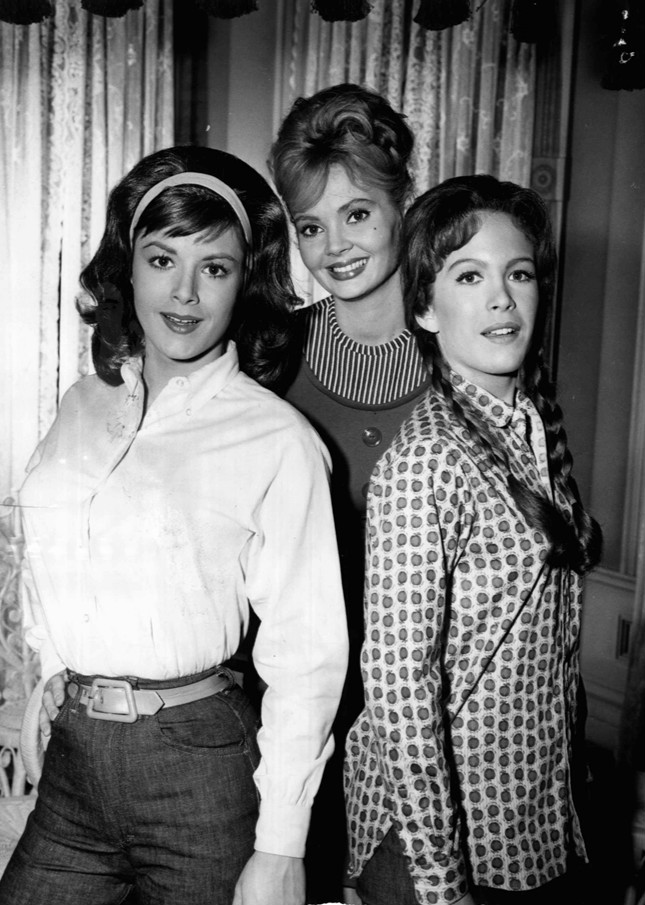
The original Bradley sisters of Petticoat Junction, L-R: Pat Woodell, Jeannine Riley and Linda Kaye Henning (1964)

Patricia Joy Woodell (July 12, 1944 – September 29, 2015) was an American actress and singer, best known for her television role as Bobbie Jo Bradley from 1963 to 1965 on Petticoat Junction.

== Career ==
Woodell was born July 12, 1944, in Winthrop, Massachusetts. Initially hoping to be a singer, she made some appearances as a teenager in Catskill Mountains hotels before making her acting debut in a 1962 episode of Cheyenne, entitled "The Vanishing Breed". She went on to appear on the shows Hawaiian Eye (1963), The Gallant Men (1963), GE True (1963), and 77 Sunset Strip (1963). She also appeared in the anticommunist film Red Nightmare (1962).

Woodell is best remembered for being the first Bobbie Jo Bradley, one of three teenaged sisters, on the CBS sitcom, Petticoat Junction; which began its run in 1963. She played the book-smart character for the sitcom's first two seasons (1963–1965) before leaving the series in the spring of 1965. In several episodes, she performed musical numbers, including one called "The Ladybugs". The Ladybugs (a take-off on the Beatles) was a singing group composed of Bobbie Jo and her TV sisters Linda Kaye and Jeannine Riley, together with Sheila James. The Ladybugs also appeared on an episode of The Ed Sullivan Show during Woodell's run on Petticoat Junction. Woodell also recorded a single on Colpix Records which was released with picture sleeve in May 1965: "What Good Would It Do" b/w "Somehow It Got To Be Tomorrow Today"

After leaving Petticoat Junction, Woodell went on to have guest roles on a season-three episode of The Hollywood Palace in 1965, and in the last episode of The Munsters in 1966. She then toured as a singer, with Jack Benny, and recorded an album, but she did not achieve great popularity as a vocalist. In 1968, she voiced "Bunny" to Mel Blanc's "Claude" in two Looney Tunes cartoons (released in 1969). In 1971, Woodell made her film debut in The Big Doll House, followed by four more "exploitation" type films, including The Woman Hunt (1972), The Twilight People (1972), Class of '74 (1972), and The Roommates (1973), but she did not break into mainstream feature films.

Woodell retired from acting in 1973, after appearing on an episode of The New Perry Mason, entitled "The Case of the Murdered Murderer". She soon went to work for Werner Erhard, in his est seminar organization, and subsequently cofounded a consulting firm, retiring in 2013. Woodell never returned to acting, but appeared in a few documentaries about her days on Petticoat Junction.

== Personal life and death ==
Woodell was married to actor Gary Clarke. On the night of January 17, 1964, she told a newsman in Hollywood that she planned to marry Clarke in June after secretly becoming engaged to him on Christmas Day in 1963. They married on May 9, 1964. Following their divorce in 1977, she married Vern McDade in 1978. They remained married until her death. Woodell died on September 29, 2015, at her home in Fallbrook, California. She was 71 and had lived with cancer for more than 20 years.
