= J.J. Starbuck =

American crime drama television series

- Genre: Crime drama
- Created by: Stephen J. Cannell
- Developed by: NBC
- Starring: Dale Robertson; Jimmy Dean; Shawn Weatherly and Ben Vereen
- Theme music composer: Mike Post
- Opening theme: 'Gone Again' Music by Mike Post, Lyrics by Stephen Geyer, Performed by Ronnie Milsap
- Country of origin: United States
- Original language: English
- No. of seasons: 1
- No. of episodes: 16

Production
- Executive producer: Stephen J. Cannell
- Producer: J. Rickley Dumm
- Running time: 44 minutes

Original release
- Network: NBC
- Release: September 26, 1987 – June 28, 1988

Related
- Tenspeed and Brown Shoe

J.J. Starbuck is an American crime drama television series that aired on NBC from September 26, 1987, to June 28, 1988.

Dale Robertson played Jerome Jeremiah "J.J." Starbuck, a wealthy Texas oilman turned private investigator and adventurer. Starbuck is a stereotypical Texan, from San Antonio who wears ten-gallon hats, cowboy boots and fancy Western wear. He drives a flashy Lincoln Continental with steer horns on the hood and a horn that plays "The Eyes of Texas", and spouts a steady stream of folksy homilies.

== Overview ==
J.J. Starbuck, originally from Laredo, Texas, and a veteran of the D-Day invasion, was an ostentatious self-made Texas billionaire who earned his fortune in oil and a variety of other investment ventures. Unfortunately, J.J.'s work had become his life, at the expense of his family.

A few years prior to the start of the TV series, J.J.'s wife Lee and teenage son Mark died in a plane crash on their way to make a surprise visit to J.J. who was at an off-shore oil rig. J.J. realized that the two most valuable assets in his life were lost and that no amount of money could ever buy them back. J.J. Starbuck changed his life. He turned day-to-day control of his company Marklee Industries over to his trusted second, Charlie Bullets (played by character actor David Huddleston in the pilot, and singer Jimmy Dean thereafter). He began traveling in his convertible 1964 Lincoln Continental to help prevent others from making the same mistakes he did and also to assist in solving crimes. Though based in San Antonio, he traveled the country helping out "good folks" in trouble using his considerable influence, wealth, and contacts—and more than a little detective work.

For most of the TV series, 60-something-year-old J.J. was basically a loner but would occasionally interact with his niece Jill (seemingly his only surviving relative). However, during a break in production late in the fall of 1987, star Dale Robertson fell from his horse at his Oklahoma ranch, injuring his hip and leg. The injury was written into the series and, for the series' final 5 episodes, J.J. picked up a new driver and traveling companion in the process. Actor/entertainer Ben Vereen reprised his character E.L. "Tenspeed" Turner from the short-lived 1980 ABC detective series Tenspeed and Brown Shoe to fill the role. (J.J. Starbuck creator/producer Stephen J. Cannell was also the man behind Tenspeed and Brown Shoe.) Straight-arrow J.J. and con-artist E.L. were a mismatched pair, but they were learning to trust and appreciate each other. NBC bounced the series between Tuesday and Saturday nights before cancelling it after 16 episodes. The show ranked 48th for the season with an average 13.3 rating.

== Cast ==
- Dale Robertson as Jerome Jeremiah "J.J." Starbuck
- Shawn Weatherly as Jill Starbuck (ep. 6-8, 11, 15)
- David Huddleston as Charlie Bullets (pilot)
- Jimmy Dean as Charlie Bullets (ep. 3-4, 10-11, 13)
- Ben Vereen as E.L. "Tenspeed" Turner (ep. 12-16)

== Episodes ==
No.	Title	Original release date
1	"Pilot"	September 26, 1987
J.J. travels to Beverly Hills, where he encounters a wealthy businessman, who is suddenly cleared of his wife's murder by a bodybuilder. The bodybuilder claims the woman's death was the accidental result of a lovers' quarrel. Guest star: Bill Bixby as Donald Iskin.
2	"A Killing in the Market"	September 29, 1987
In New York City, a Wall Street wizard makes overtures to J.J. about a shady business deal, but J.J. then challenges him about the apparent suicide of his assistant. Guest star: Robert Conrad as Corbett Cook.
3	"Murder in E Minor"	October 20, 1987
Starbuck suspects foul play in connection with the suicide of an international piano competition's judge in San Francisco. Guest star: Kelsey Grammer as Pierce Morgan.
4	"The Blimpy Who Yelled Blue"	October 27, 1987
A children's book author in Chicago kills his ghostwriter when the latter intends to retire, which would leave the former in financial distress. Guest star: Richard Mulligan as Professor Potts.
5	"First You've Got to Go to the Picnic"	November 3, 1987
Starbuck installs an ex-convict as head coach of an Iowa college team entrenched in a 265-game losing streak. Guest star: Mykelti Williamson as Calvin Leeds.
6	"Incident at Sam September"	November 10, 1987
The U.S. government is rendered helpless when a group of Marklee Industries executives are held hostage aboard a Persian Gulf oil rig owned by Starbuck. Guest star: Kent McCord as Lieutenant Colonel Martin.
7	"Gold from the Rainbow"	December 5, 1987
Starbuck intervenes in a feud dividing the family of the owner of a Greek roadside inn in Northern California. Guest star: Telly Savalas as Dimitri Kousakis.
8	"Graveyard Shift"	December 15, 1987
In Boston, Starbuck encounters the sinister administrator of a mortuary. Guest star: John Schuck as Powell Umber.
9	"The 6% Solution"	December 26, 1987
J.J. returns to Beverly Hills for the funeral of an old friend, and learns that a sinister realtor may have been responsible for the friend's death. Guest star: Patrick O'Neal as Don Chadway.
10	"The Circle Broken"	January 16, 1988
The leader of a religious cult in San Francisco tries to frame a senator's daughter -- his late son's girlfriend -- for her father's murder. Guest star: Alan Rachins as Pasban Bapu.
11	"Murder by Design"	January 23, 1988
Starbuck investigates a scheming interior design magazine editor in Chicago who seems to have committed the perfect murder. Guest star: Jessica Walter as Brin Coltan.
12	"Cactus Jack's Last Call"	February 13, 1988
In Denver, J.J. is shot in the leg and his long-time friend, Jack Caine, is killed in a drive-by shooting. J.J. teams up with a friend of his deceased friend, conman E.L. "Tenspeed" Turner, to find out what happened. Guest star: Pat Corley as "Cactus Jack" Caine.
13	"A Song from the Sequel"	February 20, 1988
J.J.'s in L.A. once more to finalize a charitable project. There he meets and befriends a homeless young man. The young man says he fears his step-mother, Rachel. Guest star: Jill St. John as Rachel Capstone. Final appearance of Jimmy Dean.
14	"Permanent Hiatus"	February 27, 1988
Starbuck and Tenspeed investigate a Philadelphia TV personality's murder, thought to be part of an all-out ratings war. Guest star: Ed Nelson as Ted Fuller.
15	"Rag Doll"	April 19, 1988
J.J.'s niece goes undercover in Los Angeles to investigate the mysterious death of one of her high school friends. Guest star: Shawn Weatherly as Jill Starbuck. Final appearance of Shawn Weatherly.
16	"The Rise and Fall of Joe Piermont"	June 28, 1988
An old San Antonio business colleague wants J.J. to join the campaign for his politician son. But although J.J. finds the son appears to be trustworthy, he grows suspicious of his father. Guest star: Barry Nelson as Joe Piermont, Sr.
