= The Roommates =

1973 film

- Directed by: Arthur Marks
- Screenplay by: Arthur Marks; John Durren
- Produced by: Charles Stroud
- Starring: Pat Woodell; Marki Bey; Roberta Collins; Laurie Rose; Christina Hart
- Cinematography: Harry J. May
- Edited by: Richard Greer
- Music by: Tony Saber; Dave Shear
- Production companies: A.G.&S.
- Distributed by: General Film Corporation
- Release date: March 1973
- Running time: 87 minutes
- Country: United States
- Language: English

The Roommates is a 1973 American thriller film directed by Arthur Marks, starring Pat Woodell, Marki Bey, Roberta Collins, Laurie Rose, and Christina Hart.

== Plot ==
Five young women named Beth, Brea, Carla, Heather, and Heather's cousin Paula take their summer vacation together at a resort on Lake Arrowhead, where they go to parties and become involved with local men. However, things go haywire for the women when a mysterious killer targets them.

== Cast ==
- Marki Bey as Carla
- Pat Woodell as Heather
- Roberta Collins as Beth
- Laurie Rose as Brea
- David Moses as Mike
- Ken Scott as Marty
- Kipp Whitman as Don
- Christina Hart as Paula
- Gary Warren Mascaro as Arnie
- David Ankrum as Andy
- Al Cole as Joe
- John Durren as Socks
- John Morgan Evans as Warren
- Dexter Freeman as Larry
- Barbara Fuller as Sylvia
- John Hart as Sam (Sheriff)
- Greg Mabrey as Harold
- Richard Mansfield as Mickey
- Peter Oliphant as Aaron
- Ben Pfeiffer as Lee
- Darl Severns as Nick
- Paula Shaw as Socks' Ex-Girlfriend
- Pam Stroud as Diane
- Connie Strickland as Alice

== Production ==
The Roommates was filmed in and around Lake Arrowhead in the San Bernardino Mountains of San Bernardino County, California, where the story takes place.
