= Invisible Mom =

- VHS cover art
- Directed by: Fred Olen Ray
- Written by: William C. Martell
- Starring: Dee Wallace; Barry Livingston
- Music by: Jeffrey Walton
- Release date: February 29, 1996
- Running time: 91 minutes
- Country: USA
- Language: English

Invisible Mom is a 1996 American comedy film directed by Fred Olen Ray. The plot revolves around a mother who becomes invisible, after having drunk a potion.

The film features a cameo from John Ashley in his final film appearance.

== Plot ==
Laura, Karl's wife, accidentally drinks her inventor husband's latest concoction, an invisibility potion.

== Cast ==
- Dee Wallace as Laura Griffin
- Barry Livingston as Professor Karl Griffin
- Trenton Knight as Josh Griffin
- Giuseppe Andrews as Johnny Thomas (credited as Joey Andrews)
- John Ashley as Herbert Pringle
- Brinke Stevens as Dr. Price
- Stella Stevens as Mrs. Pringle
- Christopher Stone as Colonel Cutter
- Russ Tamblyn as Dr. Woorter
- Phillip Van Dyke as "Skeeter"

== Sequel ==
The film was followed by a 1999 sequel, Invisible Mom 2. also directed by Ray. But it has also a 1997 follow-up, Invisible Dad, whose plot is described as "much inferior" than this film's.

== Analysis ==
Blending science-fiction, parody and comedy, the film has been described as a farce. In her about book about fictional invisibility, A. Calanchi states, "Fred Olen Ray is exemplary, since it seems that he directed at least two family movies on the same subject".

== Sources ==
- Mick Martin, Marsha Porter (2001). "Invisible Mom". Video Movie Guide 2002. Random House Publishing Group. p. 554. ISBN 9780345421005. independent review
- Martin Connors, Jim Craddock (1999). "Invisible Mom". VideoHound's Golden Movie Retriever 1999. Visible Ink Press. p. 462. ISBN 9781578590414. independent review
- Robert A. Nowlan, Gwendolyn L. Nowlan, Gwendolyn Wright Nowlan (2001). "Invisible Mom". The Films of the Nineties: A Complete, Qualitative Filmography of Over 3000 Feature-length English Language Films, Theatrical and Video-only, Released Between January 1, 1990, and December 31, 1999. McFarland & Company. p. 284. ISBN 9780786409747.
