= Jan Merlin =

American actor and writer (1925–2019)

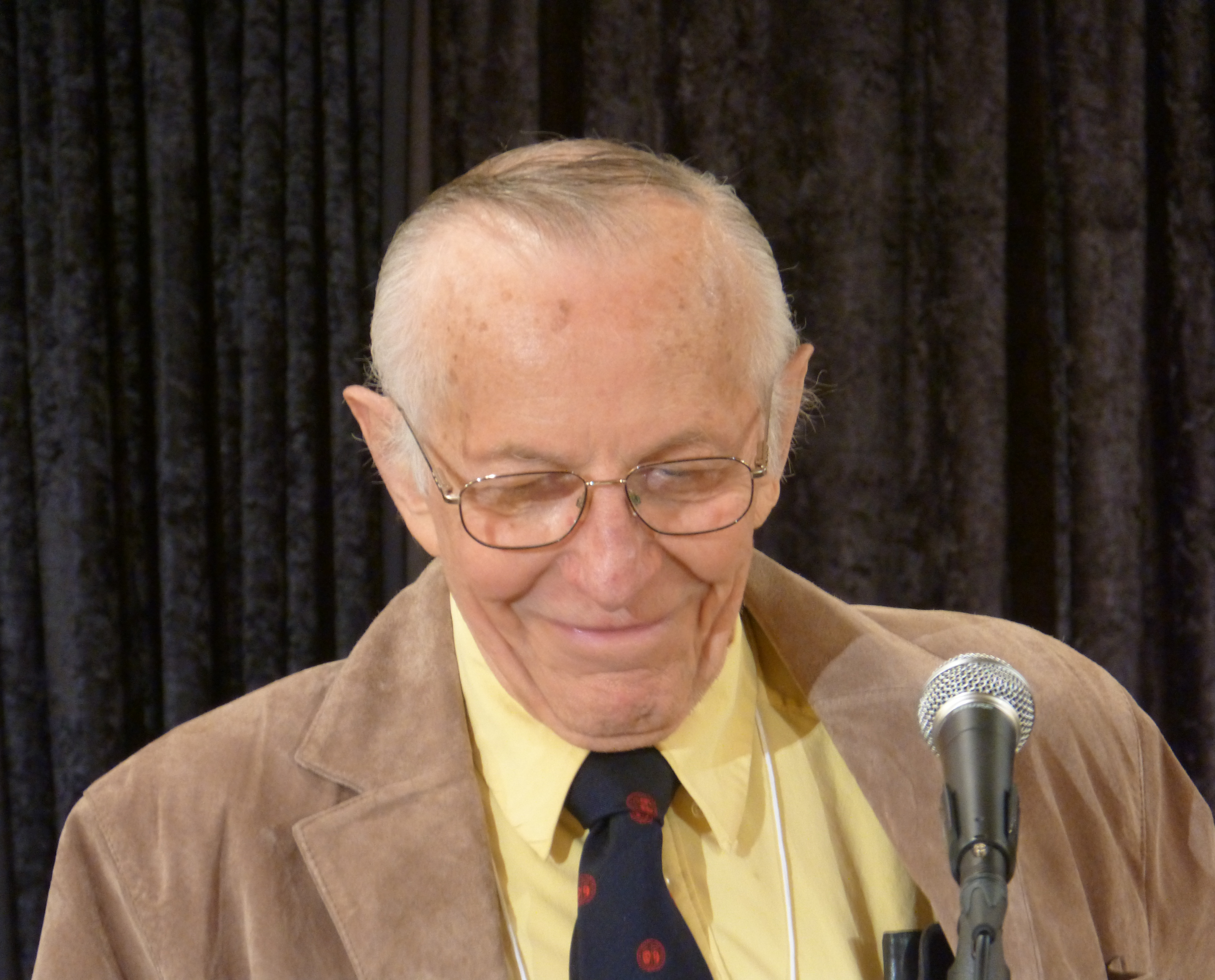
- Merlin in 2013
- Born: Jan Wasylewski; April 3, 1925; New York City, U.S.
- Died: September 20, 2019 (aged 94); Los Angeles, California, U.S.
- Occupations: Actor; author; screenwriter
- Years active: 1946–1992
- Spouse(s): Patricia Ann Datz (married 1951–1986, her death); Barbara Doyle (married 1988–2019, his death)
- Children: 1
- Awards: Golden Halo Award, 2009 (from Southern California Motion Picture Council)

Jan Merlin (born Jan Wasylewski, April 3, 1925 – September 20, 2019) was an American character actor, television writer, and author.

== Early years ==
Born as Jan Wasylewski and reared in New York City. Merlin was of Polish American descent with ancestry in Poland. He attended the Grace Church School for Boys and later the renowned premier academic Stuyvesant High School in New York City, before dropping out to join the United States Navy, serving as a Torpedoman, during World War II. Onboard his ship, he wrote plays which was acted onboard. He later attended and graduated from the Neighborhood Playhouse School of the Theatre.

== Career ==
After Merlin's discharge from naval service, he worked in summer stock theater beginning in 1946, and then enrolled in the Neighborhood Playhouse School of the Theater, making his Broadway debut in live theater in 1949 in Mister Roberts, which also starred Henry Fonda, (along with the subsequent feature film of the same title).

His professional acting career, which spanned more than five decades, included performances in stage plays on and off Broadway, radio dramas, live and filmed episodes of television series, and more than 30 feature motion pictures. His most recent performances were in live radio dramas broadcast in June 2010. In his film and television work, Merlin was frequently cast as the heavy, and consequently his character very often died onscreen. An early role for him was in the 1956 western playing Billy a small town boy getting mixed up with a gunfighter that dropped in the town in A Day of Fury. In 1960, Merlin played Travers in Hell Bent for Leather, and his other film credits include roles in Guns of Diablo (1965), The St. Valentine's Day Massacre (1967), Take the Money and Run (1969), The Twilight People (1972), I Escaped from Devil's Island (1973), The Slams (1973), The Hindenburg (1975) and Time Trackers (1989).

Merlin had co-starring roles in two early television series: from 1950 to 1953 as Cadet Roger Manning in Tom Corbett, Space Cadet, and in 1959 as Lieutenant Cullen Kirby in the ABC western series The Rough Riders. In 1958, he also played Kenneth on the NBC drama Kitty Foyle.

In 1960, he was cast as Mick Norton, guesting in the episode "Hostage Island" of the ABC adventure series The Islanders, set in the South Pacific.

Also in 1960 he again died on the screen in season 3, episode 10 of Gene Barry (1919-2009)'s famous Western and historical / biographical television series, Bat Masterson, (1958-1961), playing a wild, gun slinging cowboy, the troubled son of a deceased war hero whose mother left him when he was a child, in the episode "Last Stop To Austin".

He also appeared as Hendry Grant in the 1961 episode "First Blood" of the NBC western series The Tall Man. He made two guest appearances on the famous long-running legal / courtroom drama Perry Mason: in 1958, as Tony Davis in "The Case of the Black-Eyed Blonde", and in 1961 as Ralph Quentin in "The Case of the Jealous Journalist." Merlin has earlier appeared in a 1954 episode of Dragnet "The Big Rod", cast as Gregory Moore, a felony hit and run suspect. In 1957, he appeared in Season 1 Episode 21 of Dick Powell's Zane Grey Theatre opposite Ernest Borgnine, also a former US Navy man. In 1962, he was cast as Bill Enders in the episode "The Ride" of the NBC western series Bonanza. That same season of 1962, he was cast as bad guy Clint in the western series Laramie episode "The Stolen Tribute" . He would go on to play bad guys twice more on that show set in the old Wyoming Territory, once as actor Karl Swenson's son in the episode "Trial By Fire" and again in 1963, he played Joel Greevy in "The Fugitives". In 1966, he co-starred in the World War II action drama / war TV series in German-occupied Western Europe in Combat! - season 4, episode "One at a Time" as a German Army sniper named Sgt. Erich and again in 1966 in the season 5 episode "Headcount" as a Lt. Geiben. In 1967 Merlin appeared as a hostile alien in episode 18 ("Visitors From Beyond The Stars") of the Irwin Allen sci-fi series The Time Tunnel (1966–1967), and also played a villain on the futuristic nuclear submarine USOS Seaview in three episodes of another Irwin Allen series Voyage to the Bottom of the Sea: "No Way Out", "The X Factor" and "Death From The Past".

Merlin received a Daytime Emmy Award in 1975 for Outstanding Writing for a Daytime Drama Series as part of the NBC Daytime soap opera Another World. He was nominated again in 1976.

His first novel was published in 1982. He currently has a number of novels in print, including Gunbearer, Part I, Gunbearer, Part II, Ainoko, Gypsies Don't Lie, Crackpots, and Shooting Montezuma. He has also self-published several works of fiction and non-fiction with co-author William Russo, including The Paid Companion of J. Wilkes Booth, Troubles in a Golden Eye, MGM Makes Boys' Town, Hanging with Billy Budd, and Frankie Thomas: the Eternal Cadet.

He also appeared in the western frontier television series based on the historical fiction novels of author Laura Ingalls Wilder (1867-1957), set on the Minnesota prairie, ''Little House on the Prairie (1974-1983).

== Personal life and death ==
Merlin married his first wife Patricia Datz in 1951. They had a son, Peter William Merlin (born 1964). Patricia died in 1986. Two years after his wife's death, Merlin married his second wife Barbara Doyle, and remained married until his death on September 20, 2019. He was 94.

== Filmography ==
Year	Title	Role	Notes
1954	Them!	Radio Man on the SS Viking	Uncredited
1955	Six Bridges to Cross	Andy Norris	
1955	Big House, U.S.A.	Tommy, Accomplice on Fishing Boat	Uncredited
1955	Illegal	Andy Garth	
1955	Running Wild	Scotty Cluett	
1956	A Day of Fury	Billy Brand	
1956	Screaming Eagles	Lt. Pauling	
1956	A Strange Adventure	Al Kutner	
1956	The Peacemaker	Viggo Tomlin	
1957	Woman and the Hunter	Robert Gifford	
1958	Cole Younger, Gunfighter	Frank Wittrock	
1960	Hell Bent for Leather	Travers	
1962	Bonanza: The Ride	Bill Enders	
1963	The List of Adrian Messenger	The Whistling Man / The Clergyman / The Workman / The Shepherd	Uncredited
1963	Gunfight at Comanche Creek	Nielsen	
1964	The Virginian	Sam Lake	
1964	Gunsmoke	Ed Sykes	
1964	The Man From U.N.C.L.E.	Angel Galley	The King of Knaves Affair
1965	Guns of Diablo	Rance Macklin	
1966	The Oscar	Actor Frankie Pulls Knife on	Uncredited
1967	The Time Tunnel	Centauri	Episode 18 "Visitors from Beyond the Stars"
1967	The St. Valentine's Day Massacre	Willie Marks	
1969	Strategy of Terror	Jon	
1969	Take the Money and Run	Al – Bank Robber	
1972	The Twilight People	Steinman	
1973	The Slams	Saddler	
1973	I Escaped from Devil's Island	Rosenquist	
1974	Little House on the Prairie	Jon Nordstrom	
1975	The Hindenburg	Speck	
1988	Permanent Record	Minister	
1989	Nowhere to Run	Mr. Groker	
1989	Time Trackers	Max Barker	
1989	Silk 2	Hancock Gish	
1990	False Identity	Potter – Pete	
