= The Woman Hunt =

1972 film directed by Eddie Romero

- Theatrical release poster
- Directed by: Eddie Romero
- Screenplay by: David Hoover
- Story by: Jack Hill; David Hoover
- Based on: The Most Dangerous Game by Richard Connell
- Produced by: John Ashley; Eddie Romero; David J. Cohen; Roger Corman
- Starring: John Ashley; Pat Woodell; Sid Haig
- Cinematography: Justo Paulino
- Edited by: Ben Barcelon; Joe Zucchero
- Music by: Jerry Dadap
- Production companies: Four Associates Ltd; New World Pictures
- Distributed by: New World Pictures (US)
- Release date: November 1972
- Running time: 121 minutes
- Countries: United States; Philippines
- Language: English
- Budget: US$250,000.00 (estimated)

The Woman Hunt is a 1972 film directed by Eddie Romero and starring John Ashley, Pat Woodell, and Sid Haig.

It was the last of several films Romero made for Roger Corman's New World Pictures and is an unofficial remake of Richard Connell's 1924 short story "The Most Dangerous Game".

== Plot ==
Mercenaries Tony, Silas and Karp kidnap women and take them to an island, where a wealthy man named Spyros assembles a group to hunt the women. Tony begins to question what he is doing, and helps McGee, Billie and Lori escape. Karp and Silas have a falling out, and Karp kills Silas.

Spyros' head of security, Magda, goes after the escapees but is killed in a trap. Billie and Lori are killed during the hunt. Tony and McGee escape to what they think is safety, and go for a romantic swim. Spyros is about to shoot them, but haunted by memories of Magda, kills himself instead.

== Cast ==
- John Ashley as Tony
- Pat Woodell as McGee
- Sid Haig as Silas
- Charlene Jones as Billie
- Lisa Todd as Magda
- Ken Metcalfe as Karp
- Eddie Garcia as Spyros

== Production ==
Corman approached Ashley to make the film after the success of The Big Doll House (1971), which had been shot in the Philippines. That film's director, Jack Hill, wrote the first draft of the script. Ashley later said that Corman paid for the above-the-line costs while he paid for the below-the-line costs.

Ashley said that the film was originally called Women for Sale. Its budget was estimated as US$250,000.00.

Filming on The Woman Hunt overlapped with Ashley's Beyond Atlantis.

== See also ==
- List of American films of 1972
