= John Ashley (actor) =

American actor, producer and singer (1934–1997)

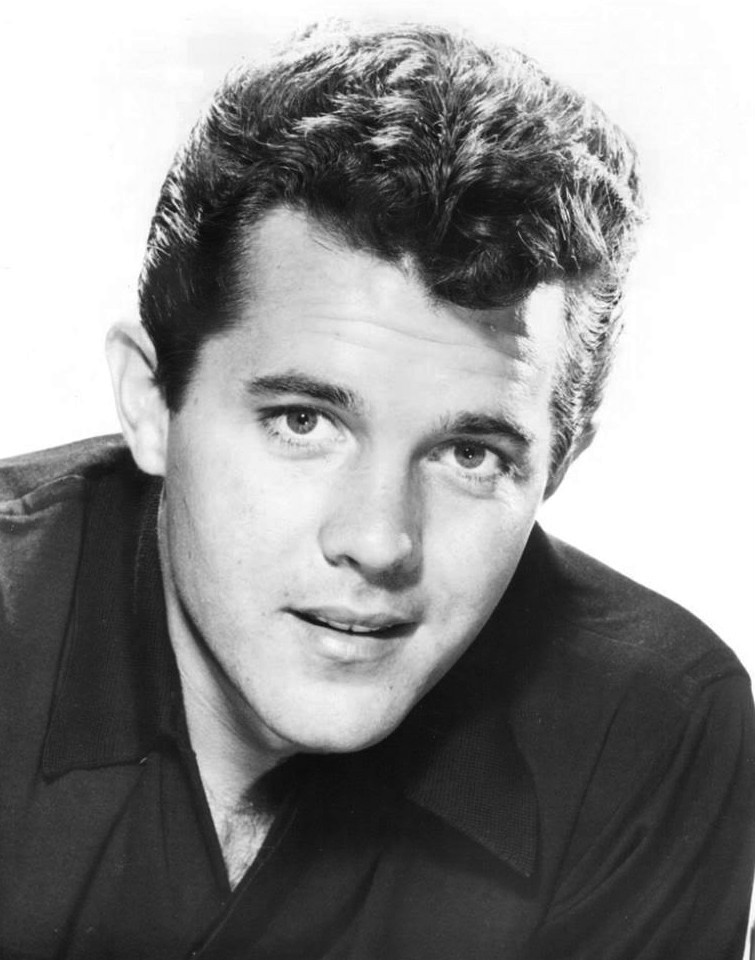
- Ashley in 1962
- Born: John Atchley; December 25, 1934
- Died: October 3, 1997 (aged 62); New York City, U.S.
- Education: Oklahoma State University
- Occupation: Actor
- Years active: 1957–1997
- Spouse: Deborah Walley (m. 1964; div. 1966)
- Children: 2

John Ashley (December 25, 1934 – October 3, 1997) was an American actor, producer and singer. He was best known for his work as an actor in films for American International Pictures, producing and acting in horror films shot in the Philippines, and for producing various television series, including The A-Team.

== Early life ==
Ashley never knew his unmarried parents who gave him up for adoption. He was adopted by a doctor, Roger Atchley and his wife Lucille, and reared in Tulsa, Oklahoma, where he had a younger sister, Kathryn.

He attended Will Rogers High School in Tulsa, where he was a champion wrestler, then went to Oklahoma State University in Stillwater on a wrestling scholarship, where he earned a bachelor's degree in economics.

== Acting career ==
While still in college, Ashley was holidaying in California. He visited an alumnus of his college fraternity, Sigma Chi, who was a press agent who represented Dick Powell and John Wayne. The agent took him to the set of The Conqueror (1956), where he met Wayne, who had also belonged to Sigma Chi. Wayne was impressed with the young man's good looks and set him up with an interview with William Castle.

Castle was then making the TV anthology series Men of Annapolis, and was looking for someone to play a role that involved wrestling. Ashley's wrestling experience helped him get the job, and he did two episodes of the series, which helped him get an agent.

=== American International Pictures ===
Ashley broke into films when he accompanied a girlfriend to an audition at American International Pictures for a part in Dragstrip Girl (1957), directed by Edward L. Cahn. "We had a date at 6 p.m. but first she had to read for a part in a movie", he later recalled. "I was sitting in American International Picture's waiting room and a guy walked out and said, `Have we read everyone? What about this young man here?' It was the old Hollywood story -- I got a part in the film and she didn't." He ended up getting the part as the villain; his audition included an Elvis Presley impersonation. AIP signed Ashley to a four-picture non-exclusive contract expected to run for two years.

Dragstrip Girl was a success relative to its small budget. Ashley became a particular favorite of the daughters of James H. Nicholson, one of the main figures at AIP, and Nicholson always hoped Ashley would become a big star. Ashley unsuccessfully auditioned for the lead in I Was a Teenage Werewolf (1957) but appeared in several of AIP's other movies.

Ashley's second role for AIP, Motorcycle Gang (1957), was almost identical to Dragstrip Girl (it was again directed by Cahn). By this stage, Ashley had been drafted, and production was held up until he completed his basic training and could go on leave.

Ashley only served six months in the Army, at the Presidio in San Francisco. AIP got an early release for him to appear in a war film, Suicide Battalion (1958), directed by Cahn.

Outside AIP, he had a small role as a singer for Paramount's Zero Hour! (1957), a supporting role (although first-billed) in Frankenstein's Daughter (1958) and guest starred on Jefferson Drum (1958) in the episode "Arrival".

=== Music career ===
In addition to acting, Ashley was also a singer. His manager, Jerry Capeheart, also managed Eddie Cochran and in July 1957 his first single was released on Intro Records – the standard "Bermuda" and the song "Let Yourself Go Go Go"; Ashley performed the latter in Zero Hour!. The release of the single was timed to coincide with the release of Dragstrip Girl.

Ashley went on to make a number of records, including the singles "Seriously in Love" (1958), "Let the Good Times Roll" (1958), "Born to Rock" (1958), and "Little Lou" (1961). In 1959, he recorded a double-sided single, "The Net" and "The Hangman," both of which were early collaborations between songwriters Burt Bacharach and Hal David.

Ashley would perform the occasional concert; one of his musicians for a time was Glen Campbell. Ashley later said Randy Wood, head of Dot Records, "was terrific... but the kind of music he wanted me to sing was the kind of material I really didn't feel I sang that well. He was a very clean cut image guy. He didn't necessarily want a hard rocker."

In 2001, the German label Hydra Records released Born to Rock, a compact disc collection of Ashley's music.

Ashley was given a cameo as a singer in AIP's How to Make a Monster (1958) at the request of Nicholson. Ashley later said "that was casting more or less against type at that point because I had been playing delinquents and heavies."

AIP wanted Ashley to make a film called Hot Rod Gang (1958) aka Fury Unleashed, written by Rusoff and directed by Lew Landers. Gene Vincent played himself and sang several songs, as did Ashley. It was Ashley's first sympathetic lead role.

He was offered a part on the TV series Matinee Theatre, in an episode called "The Alleyway" with Janis Paige, and asked for the movie to be postponed so he could take it. However, Samuel Arkoff of AIP refused, and got an injunction preventing Ashley from appearing on TV. "I never really forgave him for that", said Ashley. "I was very upset about it. I felt they could shift the schedule one day to allow me to do it. As it turned out, and I'm sure they had their reasons, they couldn't do it." This led to Ashley's refusing to renew his contract with AIP.

=== Television ===
After his AIP contract wound up, Ashley worked steadily on TV. He was cast in the episode "Elkton Lake Feud" of the syndicated western television series Frontier Doctor, starring Rex Allen and directed by William Witney. He also appeared in the Henry Fonda show The Deputy ("The Wild Wind"), The Millionaire ("Susan Johnson", playing an aspiring singer) and Wagon Train ("The Amos Gibben Story"). Ashley thought he was often cast in Westerns because "I was from Oklahoma, and could ride, and had a bit of an accent when I first came out here. I always seemed the young Billy the Kid gunslinger."

Ashley returned to features with the lead in High School Caesar (1960), playing a tyrant at high school; it was made for an even smaller budget than his AIP films and was distributed by Roger Corman's Filmgroup. He went back to TV, guesting on Death Valley Days ("The Holdup-Proof Sale").

Ashley later said that at this stage of his career, he had no interest in the production side of things. "I was just having fun doing it", he said.

=== Straightaway ===
From 1961 to 1962, Ashley was cast in a co-starring role with Brian Kelly on the ABC adventure series Straightaway, set in an automobile mechanic shop and often focusing on the sport of drag racing. Ashley would occasionally sing. It ran for 26 episodes.

While a cast member of Straightaway, Ashley appeared in the 1961 episode, "The Holdup-Proof Safe" of then syndicated western anthology series, Death Valley Days, hosted by Stanley Andrews. He played the role of Sandy, a young rodeo performer who wants to become a deputy sheriff so that he can marry his sweetheart, Katie Downs (Susan Crane). However, he is arrested for the theft of funds from the "holdup-proof" safe in the building of merchant Gus Lammerson (Regis Toomey). With Katie's aid, Sandy escapes jail to find the real thieves.

Ashley also appeared in another episode of Wagon Train ("The Abel Weatherly Story"), as well as Rawhide ("Incident in the Garden of Eden"), The Beverly Hillbillies ("Elly Becomes a Secretary") and Petticoat Junction ("Spur Line to Shady Rest"). Ashley had a part in Hud (1963), perhaps his most acclaimed film, although several of his scenes wound up being cut in the final edit.

=== Beach party movies ===
Ashley was one of the few AIP lead actors who made the transition from juvenile delinquent movies to beach party films when he was called back to the studio to play Ken, Frankie Avalon's best friend in Beach Party (1963). "The wounds had healed", said Ashley later. Filmink argued the main function of Ashley's character was to "protect" Frankie Avlon's character. The movie was a success and AIP signed Ashley to do two more movies.

Ashley returned for the sequels Muscle Beach Party (1964) and Bikini Beach (1964), playing "Johnny" (essentially the same role as in Beach Party). He guest starred on Dr Kildare in "Night of the Beast" (1964).

Ashley was not in Pajama Party (1964), but did appear in Sergeant Deadhead (1965), once again playing Avalon's best friend. He was in Beach Blanket Bingo (1965), this time playing Avalon's rival. Both Sergeant Deadhead and Bingo featured Deborah Walley, whom Ashley had married in 1962.

Ashley later recalled shooting one of the beach party scenes with Avalon, saying, "Our backs were to the water camera and we were walking and talking and Frankie said, 'Man, can you believe us? Two 30-year-old guys out here in body make-up and red trunks.'"

Beach Blanket Bingo was the only beach movie where Ashley had much to do. "That was the only one where there was really a character", he said. "Other than that, it was basically 'Frankie's buddy stands – the guy in the red bathing suit.'" He co starred with his wife Deborah Walley.

Ashley was given a lead role for Azalea Films' The Eye Creatures (1965), filmed in Texas and directed by Larry Buchanan as a remake of AIP's Invasion of the Saucer Men (1957). Ashley later estimated his fee took up more than half the budget.

For Allied Artists, he played Baby Face Nelson in Young Dillinger (1965) alongside Nick Adams and Robert Conrad. He was reportedly going to do Three to Make Zero, a thriller with Conrad from a script by Richard Bakalyan but it was not made. Also announced but not made was Runaway Skis, meant to star Ashley and Walley, from a script by James Stacy and directed by Frank Paris.

Ashley's final beach party movie was How to Stuff a Wild Bikini (1965), where he played "Johnny"; he sang a few songs on the soundtrack. Ashley did not appear in the final film in the series, The Ghost in the Invisible Bikini (1966), although he was originally announced as starring in it and Walley did appear.

He guest starred on Conrad's show The Wild Wild West, appearing in "The Night of Watery Death", and was back on The Beverly Hillbillies in "The Cat Burglar" and "Mr. Universe Muscles In".

=== The Philippines and Eddie Romero ===
In 1968, Ashley received an offer to make a film in the Philippines. As his marriage to Walley ended, he was keen to get out of the country and accepted. He made Brides of Blood (1968) for producer Eddie Romero, the second movie in Romero's "Blood Island" horror film series. Ashley also had a supporting role in a war film for Romero that starred James Shigeta titled Manila, Open City (1968).

Ashley starred in Hell on Wheels (1967), playing the brother of Marty Robbins. He also had a small role in 2001: A Space Odyssey playing an astronaut, a part that was cut from some editions of the film.

Ashley then returned to Oklahoma, where he ran some movie theaters. A distributor friend of Ashley's found success screening Brides of Blood and suggested that Ashley return to the Philippines to make another film there. Ashley agreed and returned to the Philippines to star in The Mad Doctor of Blood Island in 1969, co-directed by Romero. It did well at the box office, beginning a long-running association with the Philippines and with Romero. Ashley returned to the Philippines to make a sequel to Mad Doctor, Beast of Blood (1970) for Hemisphere Pictures, again directed by Romero.

"It was a release for me to live in the Philippines for three months a year", said Ashley. "I bought a condo there; it was like a vacation for me".

Romero recalled Ashley as "very easy to get along with, very companionable."

== Producer ==
=== Four Associates ===
After finishing Beast of Blood, Romero suggested to Ashley that they finance their own movies. They formed their own company, Four Associates Ltd; its first release was Beast of the Yellow Night (1971). Ashley next appeared in a Western called Smoke in the Wind, his first acting appearance in an American-shot film for a number of years; it was not widely seen, however, and was not released until 1975.

Additional funding for Yellow Night came from Corman and his New World Pictures. Corman told Ashley about The Big Doll House (1971), which he wanted to make in Puerto Rico; Ashley encouraged Corman to produce it in the Philippines and the director agreed. Ashley worked as executive producer, providing the above-the-line costs. The film was a huge success and initiated a cycle of women in prison films.

Ashley starred in and produced The Woman Hunt (1972), a remake of The Most Dangerous Game, for Romero and Corman. Ashley and Romero then made The Twilight People (1972), an adaptation of The Island of Dr Moreau, for Dimension Pictures, which Ashley considered one of his favorite films.

Ashley and Romero produced (but Ashley did not appear in) Black Mama White Mama (1973), a variation on The Defiant Ones, for AIP. It was his most financially successful feature as a producer.

He appeared in and produced Beyond Atlantis (1973) for Dimension, a variation on The Treasure of the Sierra Madre starring Patrick Wayne and directed by Romero. The film was aimed at a family audience and was less violent than other Romero/Ashley films – it performed less well at the box office. Ashley later said it was the only film he had money in which "didn't make it".

Ashley produced and appeared in Black Mamba (1974), but the movie was not released until after Ashley's death in 1997. He also acted in and produced Savage Sisters (1974) (aka Ebony Ivory and Jade) for AIP; the Los Angeles Times said he played his role in the latter with "surprising flair".

In April 1974 he was given a special award for his contribution to the Philippines film industry at the Filipino Academy of Movies Arts and Sciences; he had made 11 movies there.

Ashley produced and had a support role in Sudden Death (1977), directed by Romero and starring Robert Conrad.

=== Apocalypse Now ===
During 1975–76, Ashley acted as Philippines liaison for Apocalypse Now (1979). He said,

Fred Roos made up a list: Can you provide the following things? He used my company on a loan-out basis so he didn't have to go into the tax situation of starting a new company. One of the things we were able to provide was about a half-dozen Huey helicopters, the kind that had been used in Vietnam.

Ashley spent a year working with Francis Ford Coppola and Roos on Apocalypse Now until he returned to Oklahoma to manage his theaters. "I told Francis a year was too long to be away from my theater business, and I went back to Oklahoma", he said. By the late 1970s, the Philippines was becoming less attractive as a filming destination, and Ashley made no further films there.

== Return to the U.S. ==
Ashley announced he would make Cheerleaders (about three cheerleaders) and Hard Time Aces (the latter starring Conrad) for New World, but never made the films.

By this stage, Ashley had about 40 screens in Oklahoma, which he ended up selling to a major theater circuit. "I couldn't compete with the big boys", he said. He took about a year off, "watched my two sons play football for about a year, and then my (third) wife said, 'What are you going to do? You'll go crazy here.' So four years ago, we moved to Los Angeles."

Ashley went to work as a producer at Conrad's production company. He produced two TV movies starring Conrad, Coach of the Year (1980) and Will: G. Gordon Liddy (1982).

=== The A Team ===
Ashley was hired by Stephen J. Cannell to work on The Quest (1982). During the filming of an episode in France, Ashley had a heart attack. "I was a little overweight, I had put on a few pounds, and I got some diet pills and they caused a spasm in my heart", he recalled.

Ashley recovered, and when The Quest was canceled due to poor ratings, Cannell offered Ashley The A Team. He was one of three supervising producers, along with Frank Lupo, of a hit show that ran for 98 episodes (Ashley went from "producer" to "executive producer" for the last few seasons). Ashley also served as the narrator of the opening title sequence during the show's first four seasons and made a cameo during the first season.

"You can never predict a hit", Ashley later reflected, "but we were shooting the pilot... in Mexico, and a lot of crew members said, 'I got a feeling about this'. It's like catching lightning, this kind of success -- it only happens once in your life, finding someone like Mr. T and having him and the show become the phenomenon they have".

Frank Lupo persuaded Ashley to play a cameo in the show's second two-hour special, as a backer for a bogus horror movie proposed by series regular Dirk Benedict, called The Beast of the Yellow Night. A few seconds from that episode, showing Benedict with his arm around Ashley, can be glimpsed in the series' opening credits sequence.

"One of the things I like about the series is working with young actors who come in and read for us", he said in 1985. "A lot of them have their own little bits of business. Sometimes it's funny, sometimes it's a little sad. But I know what it's like. I've been there."

=== Later career ===
Ashley then produced Werewolf (1987), created by Lupo, which ran for 28 episodes.

He produced Something Is Out There (1988), a miniseries which led to a short-lived series.

He also worked on Police Story: Gladiator School (1988) with Conrad, Hardball (1989), the TV movie Dark Avenger (1990), The Raven (1992) and the TV movie Journey to the Center of the Earth (1993).

Ashley produced some seasons of Walker, Texas Ranger. He did another TV series for Cannell, Marker (1995), and a series starring Brian Bosworth, Lawless (1997), which was canceled after one episode.

Ashley briefly returned to acting with a small role in Invisible Mom (1996), directed by his friend Fred Olen Ray. He had previously turned down a role in the 1987 beach party parody Back to the Beach.

His last film as producer was Scar City (1998).

== Personal life ==
Ashley married actress Deborah Walley in 1962. They had one son before they divorced in 1966. Ashley married Nancy Moore in 1966; they had one son.

== Death ==
On October 3, 1997, Ashley died of a heart attack in New York City at the age of 62. He had just left the set of the movie Scar City, and died in his car in the parking lot outside the studio.

== Selected filmography ==
- Dragstrip Girl (1957) – Fred Armstrong
- Motorcycle Gang (1957) – Nick Rogers
- Zero Hour! (1957) – TV singer
- Suicide Battalion (1958) – Pvt. Tommy Novello
- How to Make a Monster (1958) – John Ashley
- Hot Rod Gang (1958) – John Abernathy III
- Frankenstein's Daughter (1958) – Johnny Bruder
- High School Caesar (1960) – Matt Stevens
- Hud (1963) – Hermy
- Beach Party (1963) – Ken
- Muscle Beach Party (1964) – Johnny
- Bikini Beach (1964) – Johnny
- Beach Blanket Bingo (1965) – Steve Gordon
- Young Dillinger (1965) – "Baby Face" Nelson
- How to Stuff a Wild Bikini (1965) – Johnny
- Sergeant Deadhead (1965) – Airman Filroy
- The Eye Creatures (1965, TV movie) – Stan Kenyon
- Hell on Wheels (1967) – Del Robbins
- Brides of Blood (1968) – Jim Farrell
- Manila, Open City (1968) – Morgan, a Medic
- The Mad Doctor of Blood Island (1968) – Dr. Bill Foster
- Beast of Blood (1970, also producer) – Dr. Bill Foster
- Beast of the Yellow Night (1971, also producer) – Joseph Langdon/Philip Rogers
- The Big Doll House (1971, associate producer only)
- The Twilight People (1972, also producer) – Matt Farrell
- The Woman Hunt (1972, also producer) – Tony
- Black Mama, White Mama (1972, producer only)
- Beyond Atlantis (1973, also producer) – Logan
- Savage Sisters (1974, also producer) – W. P. Billingsley
- Black Mamba (1974, also producer) – Dr. Paul Morgan
- Smoke in the Wind (1975) – Whipple Mondier
- Sudden Death (1977) – John Shaw
- Apocalypse Now (1979, associate producer only)
- Invisible Mom (1997) – Herbert Pringle (voice) (final film role)
- Scar City (1998, producer only)

=== Television ===
- Men of Annapolis (1957) – Joe/Tony Bellor
- Jefferson Drum (1958) – Tim Keough
- The Deputy (1959) – Trooper Nelson
- The Millionaire (1960) – Ken Clarkson
- Death Valley Days (1961) – Sandy
- Straightaway (1961–1962) – Clipper Hamilton
- Wagon Train (1960–1963) – Michelangelo Fratelli/Bill Collier
- Petticoat Junction (1963) – Fred
- The Beverly Hillbillies (1963–1967) – Troy Apollo/Mike Wilcox/Bob Billington
- Dr Kildare (1964) – Mitch
- The Wild Wild West (1966) – Lt. Keighley
- Coach of the Year (1980, producer only)
- Will: G. Gordon Liddy (1982, producer only)
- The A-Team (1983–1986, executive producer) – narrator/radio newscaster/announcer (voice, uncredited)
- The Quest (1982, producer)
- Werewolf (1987, executive producer only)
- Something Is Out There (1988, producer only)
- Hardball (1989, producer only)
- Raven (1992, executive producer only)
- Journey to the Centre of the Earth (1993, producer only)
- Walker, Texas Ranger (1993–1994, executive producer only)
- Marker (1995, producer only)
- Lawless (1997, producer only)

=== Unmade projects ===
- Thorns of Bonaparte (1967)

== Select discography ==
=== Singles ===
- "Let Yourself Go-Go-Go"/"Bermuda" (August 1957, Intro Records) – his first single
- "Pickin' on the Wrong Chicken"/"Born to Rock" (May 1958, Dot Records)
- "Seriously in Love"/"I Want to Hear It from You" (1958, Silver Records)
- "My Story"/"Let the Good Times Roll" (December 1958, Dot Records)
- "Suddenly You Want to Dance"/"Return by Heart" (Feb 1959)
- "The Hangman"/"The Net" (April 1959, Dot Records) - Variety said this had "a stirring Western beat"
- "I Want To Hear It From You"/"Seriously In Love" (December 1959, Silver Records)
- "Cry of the Wild Goose"/"One Love" (March 1960, Silver Records)
- "Little Lou"/"I Need Your Lovin'" (May 1961, Capehart Records)

=== Compilation albums ===
Born to Rock (2001, Hydra Records)

=== From Hot Rod Gang ===
- "Believe Me" (1958)
- "Annie Laurie" (1958)
- "Hit and Run Lover" (1958)

=== From How to Stuff a Wild Bikini ===
- "How to Stuff a Wild Bikini" (1965) – sung in the film
- "That's What I Call a Healthy Girl" (1965) – sung in the film
- "The Boy Next Door" (1965) – cover version of song from the film
- "After the Party" (1965) – cover version of song from the film
- "Follow Your Leader" (1965) – cover version of song from the film

=== Other songs ===
- "You Gotta Have Eee-Ooo"
- "Don't Let Them Tear Us Apart"
- "Mean Mean Woman"
- "Can't Let You Go"
