= Beyond Atlantis (film) =

1973 film by Eddie Romero

- Original release poster
- Directed by: Eddie Romero
- Written by: Charles Johnson
- Story by: Stephanie Rothman
- Produced by: John Ashley; Eddie Romero; Charles S. Swartz
- Starring: Patrick Wayne; John Ashley; Leigh Christian; George Nader
- Cinematography: Justo Paulino
- Edited by: Andrew Herbert
- Music by: Ed Norton
- Production company: Dimension Pictures
- Release date: April 18, 1973
- Running time: 91 minutes
- Countries: United States; Philippines
- Language: English
- Budget: $200,000-250,000

Beyond Atlantis is a 1973 American-Filipino science fiction horror film directed by Eddie Romero, written by Charles Johnson, based on a story by Stephanie Rothman, and starring Patrick Wayne and John Ashley.

The film was described by cult filmmaker David DeCoteau as "one of the very few family-oriented B movies to come out of the Philippines"; this was due to star Wayne's insistence that the film be accessible to families.

== Plot ==
A man brings a woman named Syrene (Leigh Christian) to an island, and she pays him with some pearls. The inhabitants of the island appear to be inbred, with oversized eyes, and they kill any intruders that they find.

Back on the mainland, the fisherman Manuel the Barracuda (Vic Díaz) pays East Eddie (Sid Haig), who runs the piers, with some pearls. Eddie shows them to Logan (Ashley), a local hustler, and they decide to find the source of the pearls. Logan meets Vic Mathias (Patrick Wayne), who has a boat, and strikes a deal with him to use the boat to look for the pearls.

Dr. Katherine Vernon (Lenore Stevens) overhears this and talks to Logan, who agrees to meet her the next day. At a museum, Dr. Vernon tells Logan that she wants to find the pearls solely for their scientific value.

The party sets off for the island, confronting Manuel the Barracuda and finding the location. The group encounters Syrene and her people, who can live both on land and in the sea, and she agrees to show the party where the pearls are, but Syrene and her father Nereus (George Nader) want to mate Syrene with one of the group; specifically, Vic. She leads them to beds of pearls and the first mate is mysteriously killed. Vic wants to leave, but Logan and Eddie want to make one more dive. Syrene enraptures Vic and they mate.

Nereus decides that the group must die, and Vic, Logan, Eddie and the crew have to fight their way back to their boat. Katherine is jumped by Syrene, but Syrene is killed, thus ending any chance for the race of sea people to continue. They all march into the sea as Logan takes a blanket of pearls from Syrene's funeral bier. Manuel arrives and tries to double-cross the surviving pearl hunters. A fight breaks out and the case of pearls falls overboard, with Logan trying to convince Eddie and Vic that they can find the pearls again.

== Cast ==
- Patrick Wayne as Vic Mathias
- John Ashley as Logan
- Leigh Christian as Syrene
- George Nader as Nereus
- Sid Haig as East Eddie
- Lenore Stevens as Dr. Katherine Vernon
- Vic Díaz as Manuel the Barracuda
- Eddie Garcia as The Mate

== Production ==
The film was also known as Sea Creatures or Sea People.

The budget, variously estimated at $200,000 or $250,000, was higher than usual for movies shot in the Philippines at the time due to the use of underwater photography. Producer John Ashley admitted that the movie was meant to be a ripoff of The Treasure of the Sierra Madre, but he had high hopes for it because he liked the script so much.

At one stage, Ashley was going to direct it, but "the production end of it got so spread out that I felt that for me to attempt to produce, direct and appear in it would be really difficult."

Ashley said that the original intention was for the lead characters to discover the people living underwater, and "for the most part they were going to be topless". However Larry Woolner, the head of Dimension Pictures, thought that they had the chance to make a slightly more ambitious film. They wanted to cast Wayne, and one of his requirements was that the film be made PG. They increased the budget and cast another relatively well known name, George Nader (here in his final role before retirement).

== Reception and legacy ==
=== Financial ===
The film did not do well financially, something that Ashley chiefly attributed to the PG rating. "Had we done it a little harder it probably would have done better", said Ashley later. "At least we'd have had a picture that was a little more exploitable." He also thought that the extensive underwater footage slowed down the action, saying, "It's gorgeous. But watching it is like watching slow motion."

=== Critical ===
The Los Angeles Times thought that the film was "almost totally lacking in production values."

=== In other media ===
The film was featured on season 13 of the cult TV series Mystery Science Theater 3000. The episode is the first hosted by Emily Marsh as Emily Connor.

== See also ==
- Atlantis II, also titled Beyond Atlantis
- The Woman Hunt
- List of American films of 1973
- Cinema of the Philippines
