= Scar City =

Scarred City
- Directed by: Ken Sanzel
- Written by: Ken Sanzel
- Produced by: executive John Ashley; Danny Dimbort; Trevor Short producer Avi Lerner; Elie Samaha
- Starring: Stephen Baldwin; Chazz Palminteri; Tia Carrere
- Music by: Anthony Marinelli
- Production company: Millennium Films
- Release date: 1998
- Country: United States
- Language: English

Scarred City is a 1998 action film starring Stephen Baldwin, Tia Carrere and Renée Estevez.

== Cast ==
- Stephen Baldwin as John Trace
- Tia Carrere as Candy
- Renée Estevez as Cop #2
- Jeffrey Buehl as Dealer
- Michael Rispoli as Sam Bandusky
- Chazz Palminteri as Lieutenant Laine Devon
- Gary Dourdan as Sergeant Dan Creedy

== Production ==
The film was partly financed by Elie Samaha and starred his then wife, Tia Carrere.

Producer John Ashley died during production.
