= The Big Bird Cage =

1972 film by Jack Hill

- Theatrical release poster by Joseph Smith
- Directed by: Jack Hill
- Written by: Jack Hill
- Produced by: Jane Schaffer
- Starring: Pam Grier; Anitra Ford; Candice Roman; Carol Speed; Sid Haig
- Cinematography: Felipe Sacdalan
- Edited by: James Mitchell; Jere Huggins
- Music by: William Loose; William Allen Castleman
- Production company: New World Pictures
- Distributed by: New World Pictures
- Release date: July 22, 1972
- Running time: 96 minutes
- Countries: United States; Philippines
- Language: English

The Big Bird Cage is a 1972 American exploitation film of the "women in prison" subgenre. It serves as a non-sequel follow-up to the 1971 film The Big Doll House. The film was written and directed by Jack Hill, and stars Pam Grier, Sid Haig, Anitra Ford, and Carol Speed.

== Plot ==
Blossom, a buxom bad girl, is the rough-and-ready girlfriend of a radical guerrilla leader, Django. She keeps her relationship a secret, but is also quick to start a fight without knowing it. However, when Django's mercenary friends itch for some female companionship, she softens and the two devise a plan to liberate the inmates of a local women's prison, where the inmates are kept barefoot and subjected to brutally hard labor. A woman named Terry, a social climber, ends up in the prison herself because of Blossom and Django's earlier robbery. She is now forced to deal with crazy inmates, gay guards, and torture of the cage. Terry, Blossom, and Django (who busted in by seducing Rocco, one of the guards) eventually come together to face off against the warden Zappa to stage an explosive breakout.

== Cast ==
- Pam Grier as Blossom
- Sid Haig as Django
- Anitra Ford as Terry
- Candice Roman as Carla
- Teda Bracci as "Bull" Jones
- Carol Speed as Mickie
- Karen McKevic as Karen
- Marissa Delgado as Rina
- Vic Diaz as Rocco
- Andres Centenera as Zappa
- Zenaida Amador as Prison Doctor

== Reception ==
TV Guide described the film as follows: "Women living out prison terms plan an escape that results in the massacre of all but two participants. Technical effort is only functional with lots of nudity, sex, violence, and raw language to cover the amateur script and performance. Comic relief is mercifully provided."

== See also ==
- List of American films of 1972
