= Women in Cages =

1971 film by Gerardo de Leon

- Theatrical release poster
- Directed by: Gerardo de Leon
- Written by: David R. Osterhout; James H. Watkins
- Produced by: Ben Balatbat; Roger Corman; Cirio H. Santiago
- Starring: Jennifer Gan; Judy Brown; Roberta Collins; Pam Grier; Sofia Moran
- Cinematography: Felipe Sacdalan
- Edited by: Ben Barcelon
- Production companies: Balatbat Productions; New World Pictures
- Distributed by: New World Pictures
- Release date: October 20, 1971
- Running time: 81 minutes
- Countries: United States; Philippines
- Language: English

Women in Cages is a 1971 women in prison sexploitation film directed by Gerardo de Leon and starring Jennifer Gan, Judy Brown, Roberta Collins, and Pam Grier. Co-produced by Roger Corman, it was prominently featured in the Planet Terror portion of the 2007 film Grindhouse. Grindhouse director Quentin Tarantino said of the film, "I'm a huge, huge fan of Gerry de Leon.... the film is just harsh, harsh, harsh." He described the final shot as one of "devastating despair".

== Plot ==
Carol "Jeff" Jeffries is set up by her boyfriend, Rudy. Jeff does not realize that Rudy runs a ship-board prostitution, gambling, and drug dealing empire. Rudy sees the heat closing in on him and stashes his illegal goods in Jeff's purse.

Thrown into a harsh prison where the inmates are kept barefoot and subjected to hard labor and sadistic punishment, Jeff encounters Alabama, a sadistic lesbian guard fond of torture. Cellmate Stokes is a heroin addict who agrees to a plot to kill Jeff that will secure her more heroin. Another cellmate, Sandy agrees to a plot to keep Jeff alive long enough to testify against Rudy & his syndicate so it could secure her own release. Their fourth cellmate Theresa, is Alabama's girlfriend, and gets special privileges. Jeff endures a horrible experience made worse by her cellmates as she struggles day to day.

Finally realizing her boyfriend is not helping her, Jeff hopes to escape through the jungle. She then learns that local poachers are paid to track and kill escapees, who inevitably become lost in the wilds surrounding the prison.

When Theresa falls out of favor with Alabama and loses her privileged position in the cell block, escape becomes an attractive option to her. Theresa reveals that she knows the jungle well and can obtain outside help. Despite the fact that one of her three cellmates had previously agreed to a covert plot against Jeff, all four decide to escape together. They hold Alabama hostage and tie her to a tree, and Theresa whips her with a sharp branch. Jeff, Sandy, and Stoke escape, but Theresa is unwilling to leave Alabama, but just as she plans to untie her, the poacher nearby rape and kill them. Stokes plans to get away on the Zulu Queen, but really plans to sell Jeff and Sandy to Rudy for $500 each. Sandy is picked up by a cop car in time, and is assured she will be pardoned. Jeff reunites with Rudy and is elated until he tells her he’s to enslave her as a prostitude. Police boats arrive and rescue Jeff from Rudy’s men. However, Stokes is left behind, forced to become a prostitute for Rudy’s customers

== DVD releases ==
Women in Cages has been issued numerous times on DVD since the original release and prior VHS issues due to continued interest in Roger Corman productions. Most recently it was released by Shout! Factory as part of Roger Corman's Cult Classics on June 21, 2011.

== See also ==
- List of American films of 1971
