= The Big Doll House =

1971 film by Jack Hill

- Theatrical release poster
- Directed by: Jack Hill
- Screenplay by: Don Spencer
- Produced by: Jane Schaffer
- Starring: Judy Brown; Roberta Collins; Pam Grier; Brooke Mills; Pat Woodell; Sid Haig
- Cinematography: Fred Conde
- Edited by: Cliff Fenneman
- Music by: Hall Daniels
- Production company: New World Pictures
- Distributed by: New World Pictures
- Release date: April 30, 1971
- Running time: 95 minutes
- Countries: United States; Philippines
- Language: English
- Budget: $125,000 or $200,000
- Box office: $10 million

The Big Doll House is a 1971 American women-in-prison film starring Pam Grier, Judy Brown, Roberta Collins, Brooke Mills, and Pat Woodell. The film follows six female inmates through daily life in a gritty, unidentified tropical prison. Later the same year, the film Women in Cages featured a similar story and setting and much the same cast, and was shot in the same abandoned prison buildings. A nonsequel follow-up, titled The Big Bird Cage, was released in 1972.

== Plot ==
A young woman named Collier enters prison, having been found guilty of killing her husband and sentenced to 99 years. As she familiarizes herself with the prison, she meets five other women. Alcott, a political prisoner, Grear, a prostitute, Bodine, Ferina, and Grear's girlfriend Harrad, a heroin addict, who warn Collier about the guard Lucian, who is fond of torture, as shown when she tortures Bodine for hiding contraband main from her revolutionary boyfriend, Raphael.

The girls plan to escape, and Bodine makes up a plan to go with, but Grear worries about Harrad, who is going through severe heroin withdrawal, so Grear becomes a spy for her and requests heroin from Lucian. The group also request assistance from two mercenaries who supply food to the prison, Harry and Fred.

One day, during lunch, a food fight breaks out, and Collier, Alcott, Ferina, and Bodine are all taken away for instigating the fight, with Collier tied to a table for a rattlesnake to slowly descend on and bite her, while the other three girls are taken to a sauna (called a hot box). Grear, back in the cell, ties wire to a cat to reach the group, but Harrad is convinced that Grear no longer loves her and won't get her a fix of heroin. Overcome with frustration, Harrad fatally stabs Grear in the throat with a needle. The cat reaches the rest of the group, and they use the wire to strangle Lucian when she checks on them, free Collier, and escape, leaving the snake to bite and eventually kill Lucian.

Eventually, the women make their escape, holding the director of the prison, Miss Dietrich hostage in the back of a truck before fleeing. Harrad, finally sober, looks around for Grear and tries to flee with the rest of the group, but gets shot down. As Harry and Fred break through the gate, Ferina is also shot dead.

Deep in the jungle the next morning, a badly wounded Bodine gives Collier a note to give to Raphael, knowing she won't survive. The prison sends out a search party, and arrives just as Harry plans to rape Miss Dietrich. Bodine brandishes two machine guns and kills some of the men, but is also shot dead. As the battle continues, the bullets leave holes in the truck's gas tank, and a badly wounded Alcott grabs a lighter, and throws it at the gas on the grass, causing an explosion that kills Deitrich and some of the other soldiers. Collier escapes into a road and gets picked up by a handsome man, who reveals that he was part of a search party sent to look for her and send her back to prison.

== Cast ==
- Pam Grier as Grear
- Judy Brown as Collier
- Roberta Collins as Alcott
- Sid Haig as Harry
- Brooke Mills as Harrad
- Pat Woodell as Bodine
- Christiane Schmidtmer as Miss Dietrich
- Kathryn Loder as Lucian

== Production ==
=== Development ===
This was one of the first films made by B movie giant Roger Corman for his company New World Pictures. Jack Hill said Corman and Barney Woolner, who helped set up New World Pictures, were inspired to make a women in prison film by the success of 99 Women by Spanish director Jesús Franco. Jack Hill knew James Gordon White had written a film in this genre and arranged for Corman to purchase it for Hill to direct. Corman then went off to Ireland to make Von Richthofen and Brown while Hill went to Switzerland to make Ich Bin Ein Groupie.

According to Stephanie Rothman, Corman asked for White's script to be rewritten. Rothman says her husband Charles S. Swartz, New World story editor Frances Doel, and Rothman pitched story proposals to Jack Hill, who did not like any of them. They then plotted a new storyline themselves and hired Don Spencer to write the screenplay. Hill said Rothman, Swartz, Woolner and Woolner's wife "basically steamrolled over eveyone" and Rothman "wanted to take over everything."

Rothman had a big success for New World with The Student Nurses and claims that Corman wanted her to direct the picture, but she turned it down, so Corman ended up going back to Jack Hill instead.

Hill says White's original script was not used but elements were re-used in other New World Pictures, notably Caged Heat. Hill says he disliked Spencer's script but he "needed the job very badly" and agreed to direct it, although he says he extensively rewrote the script. "I thought the story was utterly preposterious so I added a lot of humour to it."

John Ashley says Corman originally intended to make the film in Puerto Rico, but he persuaded them to make it in the Philippines. Ashley and his partners went on to put up the above-the-line part of the budget, with Corman providing the rest.

=== Casting ===
The movie was Pam Grier's first notable acting performance. Jack Hill says he first saw Grier at a general "cattle call" for actresses recalled, "It was clear that Pam was one of these actresses who when they're onscreen, you're going to look at. She had 'authority'."

Roberta Collins was reluctant to make the film because of its nudity but eventually agreed because she "wanted to work."

=== Shooting ===
Hill later estimated filming took around three months, with the crew arriving in the Philippines in November 1970. Interiors were shot in a studio, with exteriors filmed in an actual former prison. He says Barney Woolner insisted on a scene where women fight in mud. Hill added:

We just took whatever time we needed to do it, because time was our cheapest item! Nothing was ever ready on time. There was a hurricane that blew the roof off the soundstage, and it was just one thing after another. And of course, people got sick. So I wouldn't call it a schedule. We just took the time we needed. It was fun for me and for the players, because we got to write new scenes and shoot them on the spot. We were waiting for a set to be built, so we had to do something with our time. I hated the script. I thought it was just horrible. I did as much rewriting on it as I could and tried to make more of a comedy out of it.

Roberta Collins recalled, "It was fun playing tough, taking over, being the ballsy woman."

== Reception ==
Corman later admitted the movie "actually turned out a little sexier and a little more raw than I wanted. So I was not that pleased with the film, I felt it was a little too rough, but it was a tremendous box office success and it helped establish my company."

The film earned $3 million in movie rentals in North America and an additional $4 million overseas.

== See also ==
- List of American films of 1971

== Notes ==
- Waddell, Calum (2009). Jack Hill, The Exploitation And Blaxploitation Master, Film By Film. McFarland.
