= Katherine Paterson bibliography =

This is a list of works by Katherine Paterson (b. 1932). This list includes her novels, picture books, short stories and non-fiction as well as film and television adaptations of her works.

== Works ==
=== Novels ===
- The Sign of the Chrysanthemum, 1973.
- Of Nightingales That Weep, 1974.
- The Master Puppeteer, 1975.
- Bridge to Terabithia, 1977.
- The Great Gilly Hopkins, 1978.
- Jacob Have I Loved, 1980.
- Rebels of the Heavenly Kingdom, 1983.
- Come Sing, Jimmy Jo, 1985.
- Park's Quest, 1988.
- Lyddie, 1991.
- Flip-Flop Girl, 1994.
- Jip, His Story, 1996.
- Parzival: The Quest of the Grail Knight, 1998.
- Preacher’s Boy, 1999.
- The Same Stuff as Stars, 2002.
- Bread and Roses, Too, 2006.
- The Day of the Pelican, 2009.
- My Brigadista Year, 2017.

=== Picture books ===
- The Angel and the Donkey, 1996.
- The King's Equal, 1996.
- Celia and the Sweet, Sweet Water, 1998.
- The Tale of the Mandarin Ducks (Illustrated by Leo and Diane Dillon), 1990.
- The Wide-Awake Princess, 2000.
- Blueberries for the Queen, 2004.
- Brother Sun, Sister Moon: Saint Francis of Assisi's Canticle of the Creatures, 2011.

=== I-can-read books ===
- The Field of the Dogs, 2001.
- Marvin One Too Many, 2001.
- Marvin’s Best Christmas Present Ever, 1997.
- The Smallest Cow in the World, 1991.

=== Translations ===
Japanese

- The Crane Wife by Sumiko Yagawa, 1981.
- The Tongue-Cut Sparrow by Momoko Ishii, 1987.

Russian

- The Great Gilly Hopkins by Lur'e, 1982.
- Jacob have I Loved by Natalia Trauberg, 2001.
- Bridge to Terabithia by Natalia Trauberg, 2003.

=== Non-fiction ===
- Gates of Excellence: On Reading and Writing Books for Children, 1981.
- Consider the Lilies: Plants of the Bible, 1986.
- The Spying Heart: More Thoughts on Reading and Writing Books for Children, 1989.
- Who Am I?, 1992.
- A Sense of Wonder: On Reading and Writing Books for Children, 1995 (combined text of Gates of Excellence, and The Spying Heart)
- The Invisible Child: On Reading and Writing Books for Children, 2001.
- Jella Lepman and Her Library of Dreams. The Woman Who Rescued a Generation of Children and Founded the World's Largest Children's Library, illus. by Sally Deng, (scheduled for February 2025]

=== Christmas short story collections ===
- Angels & Other Strangers: Family Christmas Stories, 1979.
- A Midnight Clear: Twelve Family Stories for the Christmas Season, 1995.
- Star of Night: Stories for Christmas, 1980.

== Adaptations ==
Katherine Paterson is best known for her novel "Bridge to Terabithia" and the film adaptation has become known for its striking story. The movie gained popularity in recent years.

For the film adaptation of her novel "The Great Gilly Hopkins", the screenplay was written by her two sons, David L. Paterson and David Ross Paterson. They were also the producers of the film.

=== Television productions ===
- Bridge to Terabithia, PBS, 1985.
- Jacob Have I Loved, PBS, 1989.
- Miss Lettie and Me, TNT, 2002 (based on her short story "Poor Little Innocent Lamb").

=== Film adaptations ===
- Bridge to Terabithia, Walt Disney Pictures, 2007.
- The Great Gilly Hopkins, Lionsgate Films, 2016.
