= Donna Diamond =

American artist

Donna Diamond is an American artist, primarily known for her work as a children's book illustrator. Her cover artwork appeared on a number of 20th Century novels, many of which were the inspiration for myriad TV after-school specials in the United States and Canada, notably Bridge to Terabithia, and Beat the Turtle Drum, among others. Diamond is also known for her printmaking and linoleum block artwork.

== Early life ==
Donna Diamond was born and raised in New York City. She attended the Boston University School of Art and received a BFA in Sculpture. Encouraged by artist Robert Blackburn, Diamond pursued printmaking at the Robert Blackburn Printmaking Workshop. It was there that her work in drawings and monotypes became discovered, and her art was commissioned for the cover illustrations of various children's books.

== Book illustrations ==
Donna Diamond is recognized as the front cover illustrator of a number of contemporary classic children's books, mostly in the coming-of-age and fantasy genres and targeted towards middle-grade audiences. Such titles include, but are not limited to, Beat the Turtle Drum, Bridge to Terabithia, The Day of the Unicorn, The Great Gilly Hopkins, Jacob Have I Loved, Molly and the Sword, Walter: the Story of A Rat, The Magic Menorah: A Modern Chanukah Tale, and Riches. Bridge to Terabithia, which was adapted into a 1985 made-for-TV movie and later a 2007 Disney feature film, is considered by collectors to be a valuable first edition, with Diamond's cover art portraying main characters Jess and Leslie chatting together over a mint-green coloured background.

The books in which Diamond's art appears have won numerous awards, including The Newbery Medal and The Irma Simonton Black Award. In 2010, Diamond completed a suite of seventeen paintings that work sequentially to express a psychological drama, intended more for an adult audience. The paintings were published as a wordless book called The Shadow by Candlewick Press in 2010.

== Other notable work ==
In 2013, Diamond received the BRIO Award for Drawing from the Bronx Council on the Arts. She contributed her art to exhibits at the Elisa Contemporary Art Gallery in the Bronx, and the Rush Art Gallery in Philadelphia.

Diamond was also featured in a profile in The Bronx Art Exchange NYC, and in 2012, she was chosen as the subject of the Bronx Council on the Arts "Artist Spotlight".

In 2011, she received the BRIO Award for Printmaking from the Bronx Council on the Arts, and participated in the New York Print Club's "Artists' Showcase". Two of her linoleum cuts were published and exhibited by Cannonball Press in 2010. In 2008, she received the BRIO Award for Book Arts. Additionally, four of her monotypes have been published in Carrier Pigeon Magazine of Fiction and Fine Art. Diamond is the recipient of the 2017 NYSCA/NYFA Artist Fellowship. Fellow artist Chris Koehler credited Donna Diamond as one of his biggest inspirations in 2021, owing to her work on Bridge to Terabithia.
