= Bridge to Terabithia =

Bridge to Terabithia might refer to:

- Bridge to Terabithia (novel), a 1977 novel by Katherine Paterson
- Bridge to Terabithia (1985 film), a 1985 made-for-TV film adaptation of the novel
- Bridge to Terabithia (2007 film), a 2007 movie adaptation of the novel
  - Bridge to Terabithia (soundtrack), by Aaron Zigman

== See also ==
- Terebinthia (disambiguation)
