= Puppet Master =

Puppet Master or Puppetmaster may refer to:

- A puppeteer

== Film ==
- Puppet Master (film series), a series of horror films
  - Puppet Master (film), the 1989 film that started the franchise
- The Puppetmaster (film), a 1993 Taiwanese film
- The Puppet Masters (film), a 1994 film based on Robert A. Heinlein’s 1951 novel of the same title

== Gaming ==
- Puppet Master, a job class in the game Final Fantasy XI
- Puppet Master (gaming), a person running an online game or creating puzzles based on fictional characters in an alternative reality

== Literature ==
- Puppet Master (Action Lab Comics), a comic book series written by Shawn Gabborin and published monthly by Action Lab Comics
- Puppet Master (Eternity Comics), a limited comic book series based on the films
- Puppet Master (Marvel Comics), a Marvel Comics villain
- The Puppet Masters, a science fiction novel by Robert A. Heinlein
- The Puppet-Masters, a 1969 novel by William Garner
- The Master Puppeteer, 1975 novel
- Puppeteer (comics), a DC Comics villain formerly called Puppet Master

== Music ==
- Master of Puppets, a 1986 heavy metal album by Metallica
  - "Master of Puppets" (song), title track of the album
- "Puppet Master", a song by Soul Assassins featuring B-Real and Dr. Dre from the 1997 album Soul Assassins, Chapter 1
- The Puppet Master (album) (2003), King Diamond's eleventh album
- Puppetmastaz, a German hip hop group founded in 1996
- The Puppeteer, provisional title to the 2006 album Kelis Was Here
- "Puppet Master", a song by Crooked I featuring RZA, King, and The Observer from the 2016 album Good vs. Evil
- "Puppet Master", a song by Thy Art Is Murder from the 2017 album Dear Desolation

== Television ==
- "Puppet Master" (Glee)
- "The Puppetmaster" (Avatar: The Last Airbender)
- "Puppet Master" (Fantastic Four episode)
- Puppet Master (Ghost in the Shell), a hacker in Ghost in the Shell whose code name is Project 2501
- The Puppet Master: Hunting the Ultimate Conman, a 2022 Netflix documentary miniseries about convicted conman Robert Hendy-Freegard

== See also ==
- Puppeteer (disambiguation)
