= List of Bridge to Terabithia characters =

Fictional-character list

This is a list of characters that appear in the 1977 children's novel Bridge to Terabithia, and the 1985 telefilm and 2007 film adaptation.

== Main characters ==
=== Jesse Oliver Aarons, Jr. ===
Jesse Aarons
- First appearance: "Chapter 1: Jesse Oliver Aarons, Jr."
- Last appearance: "Chapter 13: Building The Bridge"
- Created by: Katherine Paterson
- Portrayed by: Julian Coutts (1985 film); Josh Hutcherson (2007 film)

In-universe information
- Full name: Jesse Oliver Aarons, Jr.
- Nickname: Jess
- Species: Human
- Gender: Male
- Title: "King of Terabithia"
- Occupation: Student
- Family: Jesse Oliver Aarons, Sr. (father, Jack Aarons in the 2007 film); Mary Aarons (mother); Ellie and Brenda (elder sisters); May Belle and Joyce Ann (younger sisters)
- Significant others: Leslie Burke (best friend/love interest, deceased)
- Nationality: American

Jesse Oliver Aarons, Jr. is a fictional character in the book Bridge to Terabithia by Katherine Paterson. He is based on her son. He is played by Julian Coutts in the 1985 film and by Josh Hutcherson in the 2007 film. Debbie Elliott reports that "Katherine Paterson was inspired to write Bridge to Terabithia after her son's childhood best friend was struck and killed by lightning." In the novel and film adaptations, Jesse Aarons represents her son.

==== 1977 book ====
It comes to being Christmas time, and Jesse gets Leslie a puppy named P.T. (short for Prince Terrien). Leslie gives Jesse his present: an art set which includes all the colors and different sized brushes. Jesse is shocked but loves the present.

Jesse has an unspoken infatuation with his music teacher, Miss Edmunds, which is the reason why Jesse does not invite Leslie to the museum with him and Miss Edmunds.

==== 2007 film ====
===== Depiction =====
Knowing that Jesse loves drawing, Leslie gives him an art set for his birthday. He says, "This must have cost a fortune..." In return, Leslie tells him, "Well, I can take it back and get a cheaper one if you want." Later, to show his appreciation, Jesse gives Leslie a dog which is very nice of him. She names it "Prince Terrien, Troll Hunter Extraordinaire".

Like the book, the film revolves around the dramatic focus of Jesse's relationship with Leslie Burke (played by AnnaSophia Robb). He also has a slight crush on Miss Edmunds (played by Zooey Deschanel). Jesse has a sudden foreshadowing of Leslie's death. In the wake of Leslie's death, her father reveals to Jesse that Leslie loved him, and that he was the best friend she ever had. Jesse then comes to realize how much he cared for her and that he really did love her, after which he blames himself for her death due to not inviting her to go to the museum with him. He subsequently vents his anger on those around him, which everyone tries to make him forget but only brings him more frustration. At the conclusion of the story, Jesse accepts Leslie's death and builds the bridge of Terabithia, making his sister May Belle the new princess.

===== Reception =====
Regarding the performance, Bill Warren notes that the "kid actors are exceptionally good, particularly Josh Hutcherson..." Chris Barsanti writes that Hutcherson portrays Aarons "with sullen inattention..."

==== Comparison to other fictional characters ====
Alice B. McGinty draws a comparison, including a possible influence, between the Jody Baxter character of The Yearling and the character Jess Aarons.

=== Leslie Burke ===
Leslie Burke
- First appearance: "Chapter 2: Leslie Burke"
- Last appearance: "Chapter 9: The Evil Spell"
- Created by: Katherine Paterson
- Portrayed by: Julie Beaulieu (1985 film); AnnaSophia Robb (2007 film)

In-universe information
- Alias: kid
- Species: Human
- Gender: Female
- Title: "Queen of Terabithia"
- Occupation: Student
- Family: Bill Burke (father); Judy Burke (mother); Prince Terrien or P.T. (pet dog)
- Significant other: Jesse Aarons (best friend/love interest)
- Nationality: American

Leslie Burke is a fictional character in the award-winning book and movies titled Bridge to Terabithia. She was portrayed by Canadian actress Julie Beaulieu in the 1985 PBS telefilm. In the 2007 movie, this same role was portrayed by actress AnnaSophia Robb. She is based on Lisa Christina Hill.

==== Real life inspiration ====
Debbie Elliott reports that "Katherine Paterson was inspired to write The Bridge to Terabithia after her son's childhood friend Lisa Hill was struck and killed by lightning."

==== Fictional biography ====
Leslie is depicted as being tomboyish, kind, sweet, friendly, free-spirited, cheerful, daring, strong, intelligent, athletic, and clever. She is gifted with imagination and creativity, and is a fast runner, claiming the position of the fastest racer in the fifth grade, a title normally intended for boys, to the irritation of Jesse. Her family had relocated to Lark Creek during summertime at the start of the book, but after starting school she is socially ostracized for her utter tomboyishness, non-conformism to certain standards, and eccentricities. However, she soon gains the friendship of Jesse Aarons and, later, that of the bully Janice Avery, after learning of the girl's abused background.

Leslie's parents are portrayed as being carefree and relaxed, but criticized for their hippie lifestyle and dress. They permit their daughter to address them by their given names and demonstrate great creativity when redecorating their home, but abstain from television. As a sanctuary from the burdens faced in reality, Leslie and Jesse decide to design an imaginary fantasy kingdom that they call Terabithia, over which they reign as king and queen. They craft a small wooden shelter in which to hide when visiting this refuge accessed by a rope swing hanging over a creek. They frequently rely on the comforts of Terabithia to escape from daily life, adopting a puppy named Prince Terrien (abbreviated as P.T.) to join them on their fictional adventures.

Although the bond between Jesse and Leslie intensifies over time, Leslie dies after the rope swing she and Jesse use to access Terabithia snaps and she drowns in the creek. This leaves her family and only friend devastated, leading to the Burke family's decision to relocate to their former residence prior to Lark Creek. Jesse's little sister May Belle adopts the position as Queen/Princess of Terabithia after Leslie's sudden and tragic death, ending the novel with the indication that all will be restored.

==== Fashion ====
In the 1977 book, Leslie went to school the first day wearing a T-shirt and cut-offs. In the 2007 movie, Leslie's clothes were outrageous and colorful, primarily because of the time alteration between the novel and film. She also has on armwarmers.

==== In 2007 film ====
In the 2007 movie, the actress AnnaSophia Robb played as Leslie Burke. When asked, "What did you like about it and what did you see in Leslie that you related to?" Robb replied, "I love Leslie's character and the story of friendship and imagination and bullies and giants and trolls and squogers." Robb has received praise from one critic for her "charming performance." Todd Gilchrist and Christopher Monfette go further with their praise of the performance, writing, "Robb, meanwhile, has the same sort of radiance that Natalie Portman did at her age, and seems poised to become one of Hollywood's next great child actors. Knowing how to portray Leslie's cleverness and uniqueness as inadvertent, incidental, or even unconscious, Robb plays perfectly the exact kind of girl who could always beat all of the boys at sports – and they would still love her for it." James Plath asserts, "it's AnnaSophia Robb who really shines. Her character is supposed to be a life-changing life force, one of those clichéd people who can light up the room and change the energy level just by walking into it, and that's how it is. When she's onscreen, there's a special feeling."

==== Comparison to other fictional characters ====
Joel Chaston and M. Sarah Smedman refer to Leslie as "a modern version of Mary Lennox."

Leslie Burke is also the title of a song by Austin, Texas pop band The Sour Notes, inspired by Leslie's rope swing accident while entering Terabithia.

== Other characters ==
- Joyce Ann Aarons – Jesse's youngest sister. May Belle thinks Joyce Ann is "nothing but a baby". She is played by Grace Brannigan in the 2007 film.
- May Belle Aarons – May Belle is one of Jesse's younger sisters. She is the third one of his sisters after Brenda and Ellie. She is described as the only one of Jesse's siblings with whom he feels close with. However, because she is six years to Jesse's ten, she does not fit the mould of the ideal confidante to Jesse, leaving him still desperate for companionship. She clearly admires him from the beginning, and like him feels that she does not have a place in the family. She is the first and the only one of his sisters to learn about Terabithia, and becomes princess after Leslie dies. Following the tragedy, May Belle steps into a unique emotional role for Jesse at home, bridging the gap left by Leslie and deepening their sibling bound. She is the only one Jesse allows to enter into his world and the only one who has any sort of empathy for, or acceptance of, Jesse in his family. She is played by Jennifer Matichuk in the 1985 film and Bailee Madison in the 2007 film (in which a scene from the book of her in her underwear was changed so she wore pajamas for it)
- Ellie and Brenda Aarons – Ellie and Brenda Aarons are Jess's two older sisters. They primarily exist as secondary static characters, or characters who do not grow or change as a result of the events of the story. They are never mentioned separately within the novel and are never portrayed in a positive light. From the beginning of the story, they continuasly ask for favors from their mother, and pocket money which she cannot afford to give them. With sufficient whining, they know how to get their way with their parents, as by asking for five dollars to pay for school supplies from their mother by saying that their father promised that they could have the money. Being the elder of the two and the eldest child in the family, Ellie develops most of their ideas. Both have an incredible desire not to have anything to do with Jess specifically. At the climax of the story, when Jess learns of Leslie's death, Brenda is the one who tells him of it. The fact that Brenda is the one who breaks the news to Jesse in the novel only serves to increase the shock. Ellie is played by Emma Fenton in the 2007 film. Brenda is played by Sharon Holownia in the 1985 film and Devon Wood in the 2007 film.
- Janice Avery – The school bully at Lark Creek. Janice is rather overweight and tends to become offended when people tease her for being so. She has a crush on Willard Hughes, which Jesse and Leslie use to trick her. Janice's father beats her and she secretly smokes marijuana. She was betrayed by her friends and comforted by a sympathetic Leslie. She is played by Bridget Ryan in the 1985 film and Lauren Clinton in the 2007 film. The giant troll in Terabithia is based on her.
- Miss Edmunds – The somewhat unconventional and controversial music teacher, whom Jesse greatly admires. She invites Jess to go to the Smithsonian Museum, which leads Leslie to go to Terabithia by herself. As a result, Leslie is alone when she falls from the rope and drowns. She is played by Annette O'Toole in the 1985 film and Zooey Deschanel in the 2007 film. In the 1985 film, Mrs. Edmunds seems to take the role of Mrs. Myers. She tells Jess the story of a relative dying after Leslie dies instead of Mrs. Myers, and she, instead of Mrs. Myers, gives the homework assignment of watching a show on television.
- Prince Terrien – A puppy that Jess gave Leslie as a Christmas present. He is the guardian and court jester of Terabithia. Leslie's parents take him as they leave the town at the end of the novel.
- Gary Fulcher – A cocky kid. Jess and Gary see each other as bitter rivals; how long this has been the case is unknown. Gary and Jess's rivalry led to Jess's practicing running all summer long, in anticipation of the new school year, when Jess hoped to be the fastest kid in the fifth grade. Both are beaten at this by Leslie. He is played by Tyler Popp in the 1985 film and Elliot Lawless in the 2007 film.
- Mrs. Myers – Jess and Leslie's 5th grade teacher, who is given the nickname "Monster Mouth Myers" by some due to her being quite strict. She thinks highly of Leslie, but is secretly made fun of by Jess and Leslie. In the 1985 film, she does not make an appearance. In the 2007 film, she is played by Jen Wolfe.
- Bill and Judy Burke – Leslie's parents; novelists who come to the story's location for purposes of their work. Unlike most of the locals, they do not watch television and do not believe that all who ignore or reject Christianity are subject to damnation. They move away after their daughter's death.
