= Puppet Master (comics) =

In comics, Puppet Master may refer to:

- Puppet Master (Marvel Comics), a Marvel Comics supervillain
- Puppeteer (comics), a DC Comics supervillain formerly called Puppet Master
- Puppet Master (Eternity Comics), a comic book series based on the horror film franchise Puppet Master
- Puppet Master (Action Lab Comics)

== See also ==
- Puppeteer (disambiguation)
