= Terebinthia =

Terebinthia may refer to:

- Terebinthia, a location in The Chronicles of Narnia; see Narnia (fantasy world)#Eastern Ocean
- Terebinthia, a fictional character from Maia (novel)
- The land of the terebinth tree
- Terabithia, a fictional location from the novel Bridge to Terabithia

== See also ==
- Bridge to Terabithia (disambiguation)
- Terebinth
