= Sense of Wonder (disambiguation) =

A sense of wonder is a feeling of awe that can be inspired by, for example, reading science fiction.

The Sense of Wonder can refer to:

== Music ==
- Sense of Wonder (1987–), a Japanese progressive rock band.
- A Sense of Wonder (1985), an album by Van Morrison.
- "S.O.W. Sense of Wonder" (2010), a single from the Japanese idol group Idoling
- "Sense of Wonder" (2007), a song on No Hurt Like a Broken Heart by rock band Palm Springs.
- "Sense of Wonder" (2011), a song on Star by Rip Slyme

== Films and television ==
- The Sense of Wonder (2015), a French romance film written and directed by Éric Besnard.
- A Sense of Wonder 2010, a film written by Kaiulani Lee and directed by Christopher Monger.
- A Sense Of Wonder (1986), a documentary directed by Barnaby Thompson.
- The Sense of Wonder (1951), an episode of Out There.
- "The sense of Wonder" (2010), an episode of the anime series Gurren Lagann.
- The Sense of Wonder (1956), an episode of X Minus One.

== Publications ==
- Sense of Wonder Press, a publisher.
- A Sense of Wonder, a book by Marie Rodell about environmentalist Rachel Carson.
- A Sense of Wonder (1977), a book by Edgar J. Saxon
- A Sense of Wonder: Samuel R. Delany, Race, Identity, and Difference (2004), a book by Jeffrey Allen Tucker
- A Sense of Wonder: On Reading and Writing Books for Children (1995), a non-fiction book by Katherine Paterson.
- A Sense of Wonder: The Photography of Roger Camp (1987) a photography book by Roger Camp.
- A Sense of Wonder (2002), a book by Haydn Washington.
- Sense of Wonder (2003), a short story by Gordon Eklund.
- Sense of Wonder (2010), a short story by Richard A. Lovett.

== Other uses ==
- Sense of Wonder Night (1996–), a video game expo held annually in Japan.
- Sense of Wonder, a fanzine of Bill Schelly.
- A Sense of Wonder, an exhibit at the Milwaukee Public Museum.
- A Sense of Wonder (2016), an exhibition of paintings by Julian Brown.
- Sense of Wonder (2001), an exhibition of photographs by Tal Shochat.
- Sense of Wonder a painting by Bryan Larsen.

== See also ==
- "Never Lose Your Sense of Wonder" (2005), a single by English rock band Yeti
- Travel and the Sense of Wonder (1992), a travelogue by John Malcolm Brinnin
- The Non-Fictional Sense of Wonder (2011), an essay by Sandra Tayler.
- Three Stories (1967) (a.k.a. A Sense of Wonder, The Moon Era), a science fiction anthology by Sam Moskowitz.
- "Blues Subtitled No Sense of Wonder" (1998), a song on Camoufleur by American indie rock band Gastr del Sol.
- Sense of Wonder Motivates VLSI Chip Revolutionary (2020), an article by Lynn Conway.
- Sense of Wonder Trail, a nature center in Iowa.
- Sense of Wonder Nature Center, a nature center in Florida.
- Freedom from God: Restoring the Sense of Wonder (2002), a book by Harry Willson.
- "Oh, That Lost Sense of Wonder!" (1958), a poem by Isaac Asimov.
