= Puppeteer (disambiguation) =

A Puppeteer is a person who controls a puppet.

Puppeteer may also refer to:

== Media and entertainment ==
- Puppeteer (comics), DC Comics supervillain
- "Puppeteer" (song), by Auryn from the 2014 album Circus Avenue
- Puppeteer (video game), a 2013 videogame by SCE Japan Studio
- Pierson's Puppeteers or Puppeteer, a fictional alien race from Larry Niven's Known Space books

== Other uses ==
- Puppeteer (software), a Node.js library to automate Chrome

== See also ==
- Puppet Master (disambiguation)
- The Master Puppeteer, a 1975 novel
