= Flip-Flop Girl =

1994 novel by Katherine Paterson

- First edition cover
- Author: Katherine Paterson
- Language: English
- Genre: Children's fiction
- Publisher: Dutton Juvenile
- Publication date: March 1, 1994
- Publication place: United States
- Media type: Print (Hardcover)
- Pages: 120 pp (hardcover edition)
- ISBN: 0-525-67480-2 (hardback edition)

Flip-Flop Girl is a 1994 children's novel written by American novelist Katherine Paterson.

The book is suitable for children who have just entered a new school system. And the book is on several school reading lists.

== Plot ==
The book focuses on a nine-year-old girl named Lavina (but is called Vinnie) whose life has been in turmoil following her father's death. Vinnie and her five-year-old brother Mason, who has turned mute following their father's funeral, are sent to live with their grandmother in a rural Virginia community. Vinnie has difficulty adjusting to her new school, where the only signs of friendship are extended to her by a poor Latina named Lupe, who only ever wears flip-flops, and a supportive male teacher. Vinnie reacts poorly to this outreach, vandalizing the teacher's automobile and pinning the blame on Lupe, but she later learns to deal with her anger and makes amends for her inappropriate behavior.

== Reception ==
Reviews of Flip-Flop Girl have been mostly positive. Kirkus Reviews found "Once again, Paterson sets characters drawn with extraordinary empathy in a story distinguished by its overarching theme." and "Touching, engrossing, beautifully wrought." and Publishers Weekly wrote that "Paterson explores the impact of grief and the slow process of healing. With deep compassion, her story crystallizes the vulnerability and resiliency of preadolescents placed in tragic circumstances." However, The Independent wrote "Katherine Paterson has done some good work in the past, but Flip-Flop Girl is definitely more flop than flip."
