= A Gathering of Days =

1979 novel by Joan Blos

- First edition
- Author: Joan Blos
- Cover artist: Robert Papp
- Language: English
- Genre: Historical novel
- Published: 1979 (Prentice Hall, Englewood Cliffs)
- Publication place: United States
- Media type: Print (hardback & paperback)
- Pages: 144
- ISBN: 978-0-684-16340-6
- OCLC: 5171140
- LC Class: PZ7.B6237 Gat

A Gathering of Days; A New England Girl's Journal, 1830-32 (1979) is a historical novel by Joan Blos that won the 1980 National Book Award for Children's Books (hardcover) (Note: From 1980 to 1983 in National Book Award history there were dual awards for hardcover and paperback books in many categories. Almost all of the paperback award-winners were reprints, including the 1980 children's paperback.) and the 1980 Newbery Medal for excellence in American children's literature.

The book is written in the form of a journal kept by Catherine Hall, a young girl living in a rural village in New England with her widower father and younger sister. The journal details her daily life between the years of 1830 and 1832. Among the events of these two years are several that would have a profound impact on the rest of her life. These include her assistance to an escaped slave, her father's remarriage, and the sudden death of her best friend.

== Catherine Hall ==
Catherine, called Cath by her friends, is thirteen at the start of the book, and has a birthday in May, so for most of the journal she is thirteen. Her best friend is Cassie, who dies during the course of the journal.

Catherine has a younger sister, Matty. Her mother died four years before the journal takes place. Her father remarried in May 1831, and his wife, a widow, brought her own son to live with them, Daniel. They all figured out how to be a family and Catherine learns to love her new stepmom.

== Cassie Shipman ==
Cassie is Catherine's best friend. She is a year older than Catherine, fourteen, but the girls are the same height. She has three brothers: David Horatio (two years older), Asa Hale (Catherine's age), and William Mason, the baby. In the summer of 1831, Cassie is suddenly struck with a high fever. Her condition worsens over the next nine days, and she dies in her sleep on August 20, 1831.

In her 1899 letter to her great-granddaughter, Catherine says of her dear childhood friend, "of all of us, the only one never to grow old."

== Reception ==
At the time of the book's publication, Kirkus Reviews said, "The tone is suitably restrained, and the language, which means to mimic accurately the speech and writing patterns of the period, is so awkwardly formal at times that to follow it the reader must be sharply attentive. The reward is a warm and interesting glimpse into a past way of life dependent on the close society of neighbors, friends, and family. Carefully researched and convincingly delivered." In a retrospective essay about the Newbery Medal-winning books from 1976 to 1985, literary critic Zena Sutherland wrote, "Catherine's journal shows her reflection of diverse viewpoints about runaway slaves, and it makes reference to recorded history; but the details that indicate historical research on the author's part are never obtrusive, and they do not dominate the story by clogging the narrative flow. In sum, this is a book set in a historical period, but it is not a book about nineteenth-century New Hampshire: It is a book about a human being."

== Notes ==
Awards
Preceded by The Westing Game	Newbery Medal recipient 1980	Succeeded by Jacob Have I Loved
