= Jacob Have I Loved =

1980 novel by Katherine Paterson

- First edition
- Author: Katherine Paterson
- Genre: Realist young-adult novel
- Publisher: Crowell
- Publication date: 1980
- Publication place: United States
- Media type: Print (hardcover, paperback)
- Pages: 216 pp.
- ISBN: 0690040784
- OCLC: 7868696
- LC Class: PZ7.P273 Jac 1980

Jacob Have I Loved is a 1980 coming of age novel for teenagers and young adults by American author Katherine Paterson. It won the annual Newbery Medal in 1981. The title alludes to the sibling rivalry between Jacob and Esau in the Bible, and comes from Romans 9:13 (quoting Malachi 1:2).

The novel follows the story of the Bradshaws, a family who depends on the father, Truitt Bradshaw, and his crabbing/fishing business on his boat, the Portia Sue. Truitt's two daughters, Sara Louise and Caroline, are twins, and Caroline has always been the favorite. She is prettier and more talented, and receives more attention not only from their parents but also from others in the community.

The book traces Sara Louise's attempts to free herself from Caroline's shadow, even as she grows into adulthood.

This story takes place during the early 1940s on the small, fictional island of Rass in the Chesapeake Bay.

== Plot summary ==
Sara Louise Bradshaw is a young girl growing up on an isolated fishing island off the coast of Maryland during WWII. Imaginative, emotionally perceptive, and hardworking, she perceives herself as secondary within her family from a young age. Her father, a rough but gentle man often absent due to his work on an oyster boat; her mother, a former schoolteacher, who arrived on the island and remained after having marrying Sara's father; her grandmother, a bitter woman with strong religious convictions; and Caroline, Sara's younger twin sister. Caroline, who's recognized as delicate, attractive, and generally well regarded by others, acts as the main obstacle to Sara's efforts towards establishing a stronger identity for herself and gaining the affection she seeks.

Caroline is offered a scholarship to a mainland school for voice lessons, due to her rare singing skills, and the rest of the family, mainly Sara Louise, must sacrifice to make this happen. To raise money, Sara Louise catches crabs with her only friend, McCall "Call" Purnell, a dumpy, short-sighted boy.

One day, Hiram Wallace, the only islander to leave to go to college in fifty years, returns to the island. Hiram, whom they call "the Captain", bonds with Call over their shared sense of humor, becoming a father figure.

After Sara Louise finds a local spinster from Hiram's generation (Trudy) suffering from a stroke that necessitates sending her to the inland hospital, Call, Sara Louise, and Hiram work to clear Trudy's house for her return. Hiram tells the children how Trudy may have a fortune hidden in the building, which is filthy and overrun by a starving feral cat colony. Unable to keep the cats, Hiram determines the most humane thing would be to drown them. This horrifies Sara Louise, who protests vigorously, but her friends overrule her. Unable to go through with it, Sara Louise jumps from the rowboat on the way to perform the deed and swims to shore. Call and Hiram reveal they could not bring themselves to kill the cats after Sara Louise's display, and Caroline steps in to introduce herself. Going door to door and charming the locals into taking in the mangy cats, Caroline is lauded by Call and Hiram as the cats' savior, forgetting Sara Louise's role.

The island is struck by a ravaging hurricane. Sara Louise's father sends her into the storm to fetch the Captain and bring him to their home. This act saves Hiram's life; his entire home is demolished. Meanwhile, Caroline is allowed to sleep through the storm.

Hiram, now homeless, moves into Sara Louise's home. A 14-year-old Sara Louise realizes she is in love with Hiram, despite his being older than her grandmother and oblivious to her feelings. Caroline mocks Sara Louise for her crush, and her grandmother begins accusing her of being a harlot and quoting scriptures at her. Caroline suggests the homeless Hiram enter into a marriage of convenience with Trudy, exchanging a place to live with living assistance, and Hiram lauds Caroline for saving the day.

Eventually, the economic hardships after the hurricane result in Caroline being pulled from her voice lessons inland. As a thank you for the pleasure Trudy received from Caroline's singing, Hiram offers to pay for Caroline to attend a prestigious boarding school in Baltimore and have a private voice tutor. Sara Louise has always wanted to attend a better school, but Hiram does not offer, and there is no money to send her anywhere equivalent. She struggles with feeling of resentment and jealousy.

Call enlists in the navy and leaves to join the war. Sara Louise drops out of school and takes over Call's duties, finally allowed on her father's oyster boat.

Sara Louise is largely content. The hard work leaves no time for thought and, absent Caroline's shadow, Sara Louise enjoys the attention she finally receives from her family, earning her high school diploma with her mother's help.

Released from needing to provide for Caroline ever again after Caroline graduates and is awarded a full-ride scholarship to Juilliard, Sara Louise awaits the return of Call to take her place on her father's boat and finally free her from her obligations to her family.

Call's return at the end of the war is not what Sara Louise was expecting. Much-changed, Call announces he is not returning permanently but will attend university and marry Caroline.

Staying behind to watch her grandmother while her parents travel to Caroline and Call's wedding, Sara Louise gets a wake up call from the Captain when he is the first person to ask her what she'd like to do with her life. Sara Louise confesses she would like to see the mountains and become a doctor but can't leave her family.

Sara Louise eventually explodes and demands to be let go, finally expressing some of her resentment at Caroline's privilege. Her mother replies that Sara Louise was always free to go but never said she wanted to. Receiving assurance that she will be missed, Sara Louise applies to college as a pre-med student and leaves the island. She is also made to realize that her parents have always paid more attention to Caroline in part because they believed Caroline to be the weaker, not the better, of the two girls.

Denied entry to medical school due to her gender and the influx of GI Bill students, Sara Louise graduates as a nurse. She then goes to work in a small Appalachian Mountains town as a nurse and midwife. She thrives and marries a widowed father. Sara Louise has a baby boy, Caroline is debuting as an opera singer in New Haven, their father and grandmother die, and their mother leaves the island permanently.

On a snowy winter night, Sara Louise assists in delivering twins. The mother has the first one, a boy, safely. When the second one comes out, it is a small and cold girl. Since she doesn't have an incubator, Sara Louise rushes the baby to the fireside and much effort is made to revive her. She then realizes the boy has been forgotten and tells the mother to breastfeed him. Lactating from her own child, Sara Louise breastfeeds the younger twin.

== Characters ==
- Sara Louise Bradshaw: Sara Louise helps her father through the crabbing season. She is a few minutes older than her twin sister, Caroline. As she grows older, she becomes frustrated with the unceasing attention Caroline receives and attempts to become more feminine — to no avail. After growing up in the oppressive situation of playing second-fiddle to Caroline, she eventually leaves the island to move to a small town in the mountains that she has always wanted to see.
- Caroline Bradshaw: Caroline is perfect. While she and Sara Louise are twins, she is considered the "miracle child" because she was near death during birth. She is an amazing singer and pianist, and she is considered more intelligent and feminine than Sara Louise. Caroline tends to tease her sister, making up the nickname "Wheeze", which Sara Louise despises. She went to a music school after she graduated from high school on her home island, then goes to Juilliard in New York. She marries McCall Purnell, Sara Louise's longtime friend.
- McCall Purnell: McCall, also known as Call, is a boy who works on the waters with Sara Louise because his father died. He works with the Captain after he arrives. He ends up going to war, and when he comes back to Rass, he marries Caroline.
- Hiram Wallace: Also known as "The Captain", Hiram is an old man that used to live on the island as a boy but moved away. He comes back and befriends Call and Sara Louise. She falls in love with him.
- Susan Bradshaw: Susan is Sara Louise and Caroline's mother and Truitt's wife. She is an educated woman who used to be a teacher.
- Grandma Bradshaw: A very religious woman, Grandma can be strict and hard to get along with. She loves the Lord, but hates the water. She believes the Captain is a heathen.
- Truitt Bradshaw: Truitt is Sara Louise and Caroline's father and Susan's husband. He is a waterman and war veteran.
- Auntie (Trudy) Braxton: Auntie is an elderly, eccentric neighbor of the Bradshaws. She lives with a feral cat colony. After she suffers a stroke, The Captain moves in with her, and eventually marries her.

== Reception ==
Jacob Have I Loved received favorable reviews. Booklist called it "an intense, moving portrayal" and Carol Katz concluded for School Library Journal (copyright 2010), "All libraries will benefit from owning this outstanding telling of a remarkable tale." Patricia Liddie wrote for The ALAN Review, "This novel is indeed a classic, and the beauty of it is that it's so readable for and appropriate to the older junior-high student."

According to Kirkus Reviews, "Paterson has to get into [Louise's] later years to make the point, and to avoid the instant realizations that substitute in too many juvenile novels. However, this tends to flatten the tone and blur the shape of the novel. Louise's earlier, intense feelings evoke recognition and sympathy, but this hasn't the resonant clarity of Bridge to Terabithia or The Great Gilly Hopkins."

In a retrospective essay about the Newbery Medal-winning books from 1976 to 1985, literary critic Zena Sutherland wrote, "The story has a logical, but rather speeded, happy ending, but this minor flaw does not keep Jacob Have I Loved from being an unforgettable book."

In 2012 Jacob Have I Loved was ranked number 43 among all-time best children's novels in a survey published by School Library Journal – the second of three Paterson novels in the top 100.

== Adaptation ==
The novel was adapted into a 1989 television film starring Bridget Fonda, Jenny Robertson, and John Kellogg broadcast as an episode of the anthology series WonderWorks.

Awards
| Preceded by A Gathering of Days: A New England Girl's Journal | Newbery Medal recipient 1981 | Succeeded by A Visit to William Blake's Inn |
