= The Sign of the Chrysanthemum =

1973 historical novel by Katherine Paterson

The Sign of the Crysanthemum
- First edition
- Author: Katherine Paterson
- Illustrator: Peter Landa
- Language: English
- Genre: Historical novel
- Publisher: Crowell
- Publication date: 1973
- Publication place: United States
- Media type: Print (hardcover)
- Pages: 264 (hardcover edition)
- ISBN: 978-0-690-73625-0 (hardback edition)
- OCLC: 488236
- LC Class: PZ7.P273 Si

The Sign of the Chrysanthemum is a 1973 historical novel that was the first published work by American author Katherine Paterson. The novel is set in 12th century Japan around and during the Heiji rebellion and tells the story of Muna, a 14-year-old who searches for his long-absent father following his mother's death.

== Summary ==
Muna has never seen his father and only knows that he has a chrysanthemum tattoo on his left shoulder. While stowing away on a ship, Muna meets Takanobu, a likable ronin. They eventually leave the boat and begin exploring 12th century Kyoto together. Takanobu takes care of Muna, including finding the boy cleaning stables. On New Year's Eve, Takanobu sends Muna on an errand when a fire erupts at the Red Dog, an inn where Takanobu has been residing. Muna learns that his acquaintance Plum Face and Takanobu are dead and returns to the Red Dog to find it engulfed in flames. He is badly burnt from the toxic smoke from the fire.

Muna is found by Fukuji, a swordsmith, which allows the boy to stay with him and perform chores. Sometime later, Muna discovers a man dressed as a priest is following him and recognizes Takanobu. As a favor to him, Takanobu asks Muna to steal a sword from Fukuji. Though Muna brings a sword to Takanobu, he refuses to relinquish the weapon unless Takanobu admits that he is Muna's father. When Takanobu does not respond, Muna attacks and wounds Takanobu; he runs away and buries the sword in front of a neglected shrine. Fukuji discovers Muna is missing just as a visitor arrives, telling Fukuji that he is Muna's father - Fukuji recognizes the visitor is Takanobu. Amidst the uncertainty, if Takanobu is truly his father, Muna must choose between fulfilling his "father's" wishes and proving his loyalty to Fukuji.
