= Waiting To Dive =

2001 children's novel by Karen Rivers

- First edition
- Author: Karen Rivers
- Language: English
- Genre: Middle grade fiction
- Publisher: Orca Books
- Publication date: 2001
- Publication place: Canada
- ISBN: 9781551431598

Waiting To Dive is a 2001 Canadian coming-of-age middle grade fiction book by Karen Rivers, exploring the life-threatening injury of a best friend in a swimming accident from the perspective of Carly, a nine-year-old girl and the book's protagonist. The book was originally released by small-press imprint Orca Books in 2001, and in 2007 was reprinted with new cover artwork after being picked up by Scholastic. Waiting To Dive received mixed reviews from critics.

== Plot ==
Carly, a nine-year-old British Columbian girl, adores swimming and diving, spends summers with her family at a cabin on the Gulf Islands, and she's also a member of Dolphins Diving Club, a girls' club at the local town swimming pool. One day, Carly is given permission to invite her best friend, a girl named Montana, to stay at the family cabin. Carly, who is often at odds with her bickering siblings, feels a strong bond with Montana that the girls both share over swimming. They play on the beach together, and they share discussions over things such as boys, friendships, school and family. During a dive from a high rock, Montana hits her head on an unexpected log and is submerged in water. When Montana breaks her spine and faces a life of rehabilitation and potential paralysis, Carly is angry and confused and struggles with her feelings of guilt. The book also explores her relationship with her step-father and two older step-siblings, in juxtaposition with the earlier death of her biological father.

== Reception ==
Waiting To Dive received mixed reviews from critics. Sarah Ellis of Quill & Quire commended the book's exploration of difficult themes, but also criticized the book's portrayal of the main character, stating, "at the conclusion of the book, when Carly begins to accept her new father and her step-siblings, and to set aside her judgmental attitudes, I was not entirely convinced. I could not see that she had grown and changed. On the other hand, when she won her diving competition, I was entirely convinced that she had grown and achieved mastery. The extraordinary Carly I felt I knew. The ordinary one was a bit more opaque." Kristin Butcher of CM Magazine argued that the portrayal of Carly felt genuine, saying, "reminiscent of stream-of-consciousness literature, Rivers' latest juvenile novel follows the ramblings of Carly's mind, and though the story is recounted chronologically, Carly's thoughts jump back and forth through time. She is refreshingly honest, admitting her less-than-honorable feelings, her vanity, and the things that make her angry. It is with whimsical fascination that the reader watches her mature."

== See also ==
- Bridge to Terabithia (novel)
- Beat the Turtle Drum
