= Rebels of the Heavenly Kingdom =

1983 children's book by Katherine Paterson

- First edition cover
- Author: Katherine Paterson
- Language: English
- Genre: Children's Historical novel
- Publisher: Dutton Juvenile
- Publication date: June 21, 1983
- Publication place: United States
- Media type: Print (Hardcover)
- Pages: 229 pp (hardcover edition)
- ISBN: 978-0-525-66911-1 (hardback edition)
- OCLC: 9218013
- LC Class: PZ7.P273 Re 1983

Rebels of the Heavenly Kingdom is a 1983 children's book written by American novelist Katherine Paterson. Set during the Taiping Rebellion in China, it focuses on Wang Lee, a 15-year-old peasant boy who is abducted into a secret rebel organization. Mei Lin, a female soldier, teaches Wang Lee to read and instructs him on the movement’s dogma. Wang Lee’s transition into being a soldier is marked with acts of violence and betrayal, and he is forced through difficult circumstance to learn humility as part of his training.

Following its publication, Rebels of the Heavenly Kingdom received the Parents' Choice Award and was named the NCSS-CBC Notable Children's Trade Book in the Field of Social Studies.
