= Beat the Turtle Drum =

1968 children's novel by Constance C. Greene

- 1976 edition
- Author: Constance C. Greene
- Illustrator: Donna Diamond
- Language: English
- Genre: Middle grade fiction
- Publisher: Viking Press
- Publication date: 1968
- Publication place: United States
- ISBN: 9780140368505

Beat the Turtle Drum is a 1968 middle grade coming-of-age book by Constance C. Greene.

The story follows a summer in which two sisters save up the money to rent a horse, after which tragedy strikes in an unexpected accident. This story is semi-autobiographical, inspired by Greene's own childhood experience with the death of a sister.

Beat the Turtle Drum was an ALA Notable Book and the recipient of multiple awards. It was adapted into an ABC Afterschool Special in 1977, and has been printed in multiple editions. The book was illustrated by Donna Diamond.

== Plot ==
Written in a diary format, the story follows Kate, a 13-year-old aspiring poet whose best friend is her younger sister, 11-year-old Joss. Kate often believes her parents consider Joss the "favorite child", but doesn't resent her sister or her parents much, as she thinks her parents don't even realize they have a favorite, and she loves Joss.

Joss, obsessed with horses, has been saving money to rent a horse for the week of her birthday. When the big week arrives, Kate, Joss, and Tootie, an 8-year-old neighbor boy who harbors a crush on Joss, ride out to the farm of Mr. and Mrs. Essig to rent the gentlest of their aging horses, Prince. Joss wakes early every day to ride and tend to the horse and make him a comfortable home in the family's garage. Kate, Joss, their parents, and their friends Ellen, Sam, and Tootie spend an idyllic week with Prince, enjoying their summer and the magic of Joss' wish come true.

On the second-to-last day of Prince's rental, Kate and Joss climb an apple tree in the yard to have a picnic like they did when they were younger. When Joss ventures out on a branch to check on Prince, the branch, weakened by a recent storm, snaps. Joss falls to the ground, breaking her neck and dying instantly.

Kate's story concludes with the various reactions of the people around her to the loss of Joss. She finds comfort in unexpected places, such as staying strong for the younger, heartbroken Tootie, and from her mother's cousin Mona, who she'd previously disdained due to a glandular problem. Kate acts out in response to the clumsy attempts of friends and neighbors to make sense of the death of someone so bright and young, but her mother comforts her and asks her to try not to let Joss' death make her mean and hard. As the summer reaches its end, Kate finds comfort in a letter from the sisters' third-grade teacher, who tells her that one day she'll be able to tell her own children about Joss, and that Joss will live in through her memories.

== Reception ==
Beat the Turtle Drum has been compared with similar book Bridge to Terabithia as an exploration of childhood death from a child's perspective, earning praise early on for its approach to the subject matter. Barbara Wersba, a critic for The New York Times, said, "it is a simple book, and in many ways an unexceptional one. But its characters are human, and its heartbreak is true... in a very quiet way, Constance C. Greene has written a remarkable tale." Kirkus Reviews said that the book left, "the reader almost as unprepared as Kate is for the tragedy could be considered sneaky, but it's certainly effective; young readers lulled by Greene's net of contentment are bound to share Kate's shock as well as her earlier pleasure."

== Film adaptation ==
Beat the Turtle Drum was adapted into an ABC Afterschool Special made-for-television film titled Very Good Friends in 1977, also marketed as Beat the Turtle Drum. The latter title was changed for the adaptation due to concerns over potential audience confusion over the meaning of the phrase "turtle drum", which had been a line of poetry cited in the original book, credited to Ian Serraillier.

The film was directed by Richard C. Bennett, and starred Melissa Sue Anderson and Katy Kurtzman. It was released as part of a four-part set on DVD.

== See also ==
- Bridge to Terabithia (novel)
- Waiting To Dive
