= Preacher's Boy =

1999 novel by Katherine Paterson

- First edition
- Author: Katherine Paterson
- Language: English
- Genre: Children's historical novel
- Publisher: Clarion Books
- Publication date: August 23, 1999
- Publication place: United States
- Media type: Print (Hardcover)
- Pages: 176 pp (hardcover edition)
- ISBN: 978-0-395-83897-6 (hardback edition)
- OCLC: 40311548
- LC Class: PZ7.P273 Pr 1999

Preacher's Boy is a 1999 children's historical novel written by American novelist Katherine Paterson.

== Plot ==
Set in Vermont in 1899, the story focuses on Robbie Hewitt, the rambunctious 10-year-old child of a small town preacher and brother of simple-minded Elliot. Elliot has autism and many times Robbie wishes he was dead. Robbie is always being silly and tries at the beginning of the book to kill one of the Weston Brothers. The Weston brothers are the sons of the richest men in town. As the boy's mischievous behavior becomes more pronounced, he becomes engaged in activity that has lethal consequences for a member of his community. Complicating matters, is the boy's desire to challenge his father by breaking away from organized religion. Certain that his family's beliefs are too restrictive, Robbie sets out to live life to the fullest, deciding to become "a heathen, a Unitarian, or a Democrat, whichever was most fun" (p. 19).

== Reception ==
Kirkus Reviews found "Despite some violence, the tone is generally light..." and "Talky, but nourishing for mind and spirit both." while Publishers Weekly saw that "The story contains a moral, but the author remains nearly invisible as she guides her characters through crises, then leaves them to fend for themselves at the dawn of a new era."
