= Joan Blos =

American novelist

- Born: December 9, 1928 New York City, U.S.
- Died: October 12, 2017 (aged 88) Ann Arbor, Michigan, US
- Occupation: Writer; educator
- Education: Vassar College (BA, 1949); City College of New York (MA, 1956)
- Notable awards: National Book Award for Young People's Literature (1980); Newbery Medal (1980)
- Spouse: Peter Blos, Jr. (m. 1953)
- Children: 2

Joan Winsor Blos (1928 – 2017) was an American writer, teacher and advocate for children's literacy. For her 1979 historical novel, A Gathering of Days, Blos won the U.S. National Book Award in category Children's Books and the Newbery Medal.

== Early life and education ==
Winsor was born in New York City on December 9, 1928, the only child of Max and Charlotte Winsor. Her father was a psychiatrist, and her mother was a teacher. She attended City and Country School in New York City.

She received a Bachelor of Arts in physiology from Vassar College in 1949, followed by a Master of Arts (MA) in psychology from City College of New York. She then attended Yale University, pursuing a doctorate in child psychology, though she left the program after three years. Blos later returned to City College to study children's literature, earning an MA in 1956.

== Career ==
Blos began her career working in a nursery school for "disturbed children", after which she considered becoming a psychologist. However, Blos shifted careers to focus on children's literature.

In 1958, Blos began working in the publication division of the Bank Street College of Education, where she worked alongside American writer Lucy Sprague Mitchell (1878–1967). While at Bank Street, Blos taught sessions on children's literature and led writing workshops. During a writing workshop, Blos's own writing was recognized by a children's book editor at Alfred A. Knopf, who encouraged her to pursue writing as a career. After beginning her career as a children's book author, Blos continued working with Bank Street until 1970, at which point she moved to Ann Arbor, Michigan.

While in Ann Arbor, Blos began teaching at the University of Michigan School of Education, a position she held until 1980.

Blos published her first book, In the City, with Macmillan in 1964. She eventually published 20 books, including A Gathering of Days, which won the 1980 won the U.S. National Book Award in category Children's Books (Note: Blos and A Gathering of Days won the award for hardcover Children's Literature. From 1980 to 1983 in National Book Award history there were dual awards for hardcover and paperback books in many categories. Most of the paperback award-winners were reprints, including the 1980 Children's Literature paperback.) and the Newbery Medal.

== Personal life ==
While studying at Yale, Blos met Peter Blos, Jr., a medical student. The couple married on June 7, 1953, and later had two children. The Blos family moved to Ann Arbor, Michigan in 1970. Their son died from cancer at age 30; they were also predeceased by their daughter.

Peter and Joan lived in Ann Arbor until their deaths. Joan died at age 88 on October 12, 2017, while Peter died on November 4, 2020, at age 90. They had two grandchildren.

== Works ==
- In the City, Macmillan (New York, NY), 1964.
- People Read (with Betty Miles), Macmillan (New York, NY), 1964.
- Joe Finds a Way (with Betty Miles), L.W. Singer (Syracuse, NY), 1967.
- "It's Spring" She Said, Knopf (New York, NY), 1968.
- Just Think! (with Betty Miles), Knopf (New York, NY), 1971.
- A Gathering of Days: A New England Girl's Journal, 1830-32, Scribner (New York, NY), 1979.
- Martin's Hats, illustrated by Marc Simont, Morrow (New York, NY), 1984.
- Brothers of the Heart: A Story of the Old Northwest, 1837-1838, Scribner (New York, NY), 1985.
- Old Henry, Morrow (New York, NY), 1987.
- The Grandpa Days, illustrated by Emily Arnold McCully, Simon & Schuster Books for Young Readers (New York, NY), 1989.
- One Very Best Valentine's Day, illustrated by Emanuel Schongut, Little Simon (New York, NY), 1989.
- Lottie's Circus, illustrated by Irene Trivas, Morrow (New York, NY), 1989.
- The Heroine of the Titanic: A Tale Both True and Otherwise of the Life of Molly Brown, illustrated by Tennessee Dixon, Morrow (New York, NY), 1991.
- A Seed, a Flower, a Minute, an Hour, illustrated by Hans Poppel, Simon & Schuster (New York, NY), 1992.
- Brooklyn Doesn't Rhyme, Scribner (New York, NY), 1994.
- The Hungry Little Boy, illustrated by Dena Schutzer, Simon & Schuster (New York, NY), 1995.
- Nellie Bly's Monkey: His Remarkable Story in His Own Words, illustrated by Catherine Stock, Morrow (New York, NY), 1996.
- Bedtime!, illustrated by Stephen Lambert, Simon & Schuster (New York, NY), 1998.
- Hello, Shoes!, illustrated by Ann Boyajian, Simon & Schuster (New York, NY), 1999.
- Letters from the Corrugated Castle: A Novel of Gold Rush California, 1850-1852, Atheneum Books for Young Readers (New York, NY), 2007.
