= Come Sing, Jimmy Jo =

1985 novel by Katherine Paterson

- First edition
- Author: Katherine Paterson
- Language: English
- Genre: Children's fiction
- Publisher: Dutton Juvenile
- Publication date: April 30, 1985
- Publication place: United States
- Media type: Print (Hardcover)
- Pages: 208 pp (hardcover edition)
- ISBN: 978-0-525-67167-1 (hardback edition)
- OCLC: 11234450
- LC Class: PZ7.P273 Co 1985

Come Sing, Jimmy Jo is a 1985 children's novel written by American novelist Katherine Paterson. The book focuses on a West Virginia boy named James Johnson, whose parents are bluegrass music performers. When it is discovered that James has previously unrecognized musical talent, his parents force him to take the stage name "Jimmy Jo" and perform with them. But problems arise when it becomes evident that the child’s talents are greater than those of his parents, which creates strain for both the adults (particularly the jealous mother) and the emotionally conflicted boy.

Come Sing, Jimmy Jo has been adapted into a musical play by David Paterson, the son of Katherine Paterson, with a score by Mark J. Thomas. The play has been performed by regional theater companies around the United States.
