= Park's Quest =

1988 novel by Katherine Paterson

Park’s Quest
- First edition
- Author: Katherine Paterson
- Language: English
- Genre: Realistic-Fiction
- Publisher: Dutton Children's Books
- Publication date: April 28, 1988
- Publication place: United States
- Media type: Print (Hardcover)
- Pages: 148
- ISBN: 978-0-525-67258-6
- OCLC: 16985805
- LC Class: PZ7.P273 Par 1988

Park’s Quest is a 1988 children's novel written by American novelist Katherine Paterson.

== Plot summary ==
Park's full name is Parkington "Park" Waddell Broughton V. He knows he has ancestors who have distinguished themselves and the name he shares with four generations of them. But his father, a U.S. Marine Corps pilot, died in the Vietnam War when Park was three, and he has never met his father's family. Though he is nearly twelve, his mother still avoids answering any questions about his father. Finally, to satisfy his curiosity, Park goes and gets on a bus for the short ride from his home to the Vietnam Memorial in Washington DC. There he finds his father's name. There he also resolves to get some of his questions solved. After Randy, Park's mom, writes to Park's dad's side of the family, Randy sends him on a bus for a two-week vacation in south-western Virginia where his grandfather and Uncle Frank maintain the farm on which his father grew up. His grandfather has had 2 strokes and is now inarticulate, able to communicate in only the most rudimentary ways. His uncle has a Vietnamese wife, and shares his home with a Vietnamese girl about Park's age whose origin and status is not clear to Park until he discovers, after a number of uncomfortable encounters, that she is his half-sister, and that because of his father's infidelity, his mother divorced him before his second, and fatal, term in Vietnam. Park, whose fantasies about his father's past and his own future have been highly romanticized, does some important growing up in the short visit that puts him in touch with a more complex idea of family, grief, forgiveness, and acceptance than he has ever before had to develop.
