= Bread and Roses, Too =

2006 children's novel by Katherine Paterson

- First edition, designed by MOO
- Author: Katherine Paterson
- Language: English
- Genre: Children's historical novel
- Publisher: Clarion Books
- Publication date: September 4, 2006
- Publication place: United States
- Media type: Print (hardcover)
- Pages: 288 (hardcover edition)
- ISBN: 978-0-618-65479-6
- LC Class: PZ7.P273 Bq 2006

Bread and Roses, Too is a 2006 children's historical novel written by American novelist Katherine Paterson. Set in Lawrence, Massachusetts, in 1912 in the aftermath of the Lawrence Textile Strike (also known as the Bread and Roses Strike), the book focuses on the Italian-born daughter of mill workers who finds herself becoming the protector of a boy who is afraid to return home to his abusive father.
