= Bridge to Terabithia (1985 film) =

1985 film based on the children's novel by Katherine Paterson

- 1980s NTSC VHS cover
- Genre: Drama; Family; Fantasy
- Written by: Katherine Paterson; Nancy Sackett
- Directed by: Eric Till
- Starring: Julian Coutts; Julie Beaulieu; Tom Heaton; Annette O'Toole
- Music by: George Elian; Thomas Richard Sharp
- Country of origin: Canada
- Original language: English

Production
- Executive producers: Bill Novodor; Nancy Sackett
- Producer: Edward K. Dodds
- Production location: Edmonton, Alberta
- Cinematography: Philip Linzey
- Editor: Eric Wrate
- Running time: 57 minutes
- Production companies: Wonderworks; Twenty Minute Productions; Alarcom (in association with); Kicking Horse Productions Ltd.

Original release
- Network: PBS
- Release: February 4, 1985

Bridge to Terabithia is a 1985 Canadian made-for-television fantasy drama film produced for the PBS series WonderWorks, starring Annette O'Toole, Julian Coutts, and Julie Beaulieu. It was shot in Edmonton, Alberta. It is based on the 1977 children's novel of the same name by Katherine Paterson. The film premiered on PBS on February 4, 1985.

The story was inspired by the death of Lisa Hill, the best friend of Katherine Paterson's son David, who was struck and killed by lightning when she was eight years old.

In a 2007 interview, David, who later co-wrote the 2007 film version, referred to this version as being "like the crazy cousin in a mental hospital that nobody talks about" and goes on to say that "no one on our side was either involved with it or happy with the final product."

== Plot summary ==
10-year-old Jess Aarons is an aspiring yet shy fifth grader living in a financially struggling family. 10-year-old Leslie Burke is the new girl at his school, just arriving on its athletics day. She enters a running event which she wins with ease, despite her classmates calling it a "boys only" race. Jess is, at first, quite sour about this and wants nothing to do with her, but her persistence in meeting him soon pays off, with them becoming friends. He shares his secret love of drawing with her; she shares with him her love of fantasy stories. Together they venture into the woods, where they go across a creek on the trunk of a partially fallen tree, and later build a "castle" (actually a small shed) on the other side. Here, they invent a whole new world, Terabithia, which comes to life through their eyes, and which they explore together. They base the Creatures of Terabithia on those people who bully them at school.

Their teacher, Miss Edmunds, notices Jess' artistic skills and decides to take him on a field trip to an art museum. He has an unspoken crush on her and does not want to share the trip with Leslie, so he goes without inviting her.

When Jess returns home, his family is worried sick, as they neglected to listen when he said he was going, then tells him the horrific news: Leslie died after trying to cross the fallen tree over a rain-swollen creek, only to fall in and drown, possibly hitting her head in the fall. Jess grieves for her, and he and his parents visit her's together.

Jess feels overwhelming guilt for Leslie's death, thinking that it would not have happened had he invited her along on his trip with Miss Edmunds. He is consoled by his father that their intense friendship should be kept alive for Leslie's sake. Later, after crossing the creek, he hears a girl's voice calling for help and finds his little sister, May Belle, on the fallen tree trunk, frozen with terror after trying to follow him across. He rescues her, takes a minute to comfort her, then invites her to be the new queen, who is delighted after being previously denied every opportunity to enter Terabithia. She and Jess bring it back in even greater splendor; he the king and she the princess, and they rule over the free people of the kingdom together forever.

== Cast ==
- Julian Coutts as Jesse Aarons
- Julie Beaulieu as Leslie Burke
- Annette O'Toole as Miss Edmunds
- Gloria Carlin as Nancy Aarons
- Tom Heaton as Jesse Oliver Aarons, Sr.
- Peter Dvorsky as Bill Burke
- Darlene Bradley as Judy Burke
- Sharon Holownia as Brenda Aarons
- Jennifer Matichuk as May Belle Aarons
- Tyler Popp as Gary Fulcher
- Bridget Ryan as Janice Avery

== Production ==
Filming took place in Edmonton, Alberta, Canada, from September 27 to October 13, 1984.
