= Puppet Master (Eternity Comics) =

Limited comic book series based on the films

- Cover to Puppet Master #1

Publication information
- Publisher: Eternity Comics; Full Moon Entertainment
- Format: Limited series
- Genre: Horror
- No. of issues: 6
- Main character(s): Blade, Pinhead, Leech Woman, Jester, Tunneler and Torch

Puppet Master is a 1991 comic book series based on the horror film franchise of the same name and published by Eternity Comics and Full Moon Entertainment. This publication precedes the 2015 Puppet Master (Action Lab Comics).

== Plot ==
On November 13, 1938, in Berlin, French puppeteer André Toulon puts on a puppet rendition mocking Adolf Hitler, and four Nazis, led by Captain Fritz Loemann, following orders by General Muller, break into his house, where they brutally kill his wife, Elsa. With nothing but revenge on his mind, Toulon, using the method of reanimation, takes brain matter from Elsa and uses it to bring to life his first living puppet, Leech Woman. Leech Woman kills the boy from the Hitler Youth that ratted Toulon out, and his brain matter is used to give her a brother, Blade. Blade and Leech Woman sneak into General Muller's car, and brutally kill him, his mistress, and the driver; all brain matter is used to give life to Pinhead and Tunneler. After brutally killing Fritz's secretary, Toulon and the puppets have no choice but to leave Fritz and Hans Faulhaber alive for now to escape Germany and head to America. Toulon goes to America and stays at the Bodega Bay Inn, which is run and operated by Toulon's cousin Paul.

On March 15, 1939, Fritz and Hans track Toulon to the Bodega Bay Inn. After giving life to Jester, the image of Toulon himself, André hides the puppets behind a wall panel and commits suicide. His body is buried in the Shady Oaks cemetery behind the hotel. Three weeks after Toulon's death, Paul decides to let tourists sleep in his room again, and it's booked by horror movie actor, Chuck Dalton. The night before Chuck's arrival, Fritz and Hans sneak back into the room and manage to find the puppets behind the wall panel, only to be attacked, and Hans kills the maid upon being discovered. Thinking the puppets and the room are booby-trapped, they leave. The next day, Chuck Dalton arrives, along with Susan Straun, a wannabe actress who has to audition for Chuck in order to appear in one of his films. She meets Paul and they both feel a connection between them. Arriving at the hotel is Hans, along with Helga Faulkenberg, an employee of Krapps Shipping in San Francisco. They're undercover as man and wife so they can sneak back into Toulon's room. Finding out it's booked by Chuck Dalton, Helga manages to seduce Chuck to let her into the room, where she drugs him to search for the puppets. She finds the wall panel, where the maid's body was hidden by the puppets, and is killed upon discovering her body. While Susan and a recovering Chuck go downstairs for dinner, Hans sneaks back into the room, finds the bodies, and shoots Chuck dead when he and Susan return. The puppets kill Hans before he can get to Susan. Paul comes across a bloody Susan, and finds Andre's diary, and while reading it, the puppets use the elixir to bring Andre back from the grave.

Two weeks later, Herr Kron, chairman of Krapps Shipping (and a German-American who is aiding Fritz in his mission), demands to know what happened to Helga and Hans. After telling him everything that happened, Fritz explains that, through the Egyptian papyrus, journals and notes hidden in Elsa's grave, he was able to link Toulon's discovery of reanimation back to Cairo, Egypt. Back in November 19, 1919, Andre bought the Egyptian papyrus for sustaining eternal life from a Cairo Merchant named Ahmed El Eskander, and the secret resides in the temple of Anubis. Figuring Toulon went back to Cairo in search of the temple, Fritz, along with Herr Gruber and Doktor, goes to Eskander's shop, demanding to know the temple's location. Eskander tells them there's a "One-Eyed" man in Thebes who knows the location, and will get him to go with them the next day. That night, Eskander is brutally killed by the puppets, who have traveled there with Paul on a mission by Andre to protect the temple's secret. The next night, the puppets kill Doktor and scare off One Eye, allowing Paul to assume One Eye's identity. The next day, Fritz, Gruber and Paul in disguise arrive at the temple, where Fritz begins to take pictures. The puppets kill Gruber and blow the temple up with dynamite, but Fritz manages to escape with the camera. Upon arriving back at the Bodega Bay Inn, Andre is displeased to hear from Paul that Fritz is still alive. Fritz returns to Krapps Shipping with the pictures, finding out Jester tampered with the camera. He realizes the secret of reanimation is the puppets themselves.

That night Fritz returns to the Bodega Bay Inn, where Paul and Susan, now working as a maid, are being questioned by reporter Lee Maxwell about the disappearances of Betty, Helga, Chuck and Hans. Later, Paul goes to the attic of the Ivory Tower, where André, along with the puppets, have been hiding. Toulon is working on a new puppet called Torch, and with the brain material from the four victims, Toulon plans to give himself and the puppets 50 more years of life and travel the Americas. Paul disapproves of this lifestyle and wants André to leave when the elixir is done brewing in two days. Lee, seeing Paul come from the attic, sneaks up there and sees Toulon and the puppets. He goes to the lounge to call his boss, and his killed by Fritz, who sets Blade up for the murder. Paul, thinking Blade killed him, attacks André and the puppets protect him from Paul. The puppets, André and Susan get Paul to bed to heal his wounds. Realizing that Fritz set Blade up, the puppets and André head back to the attic and find Fritz there with the elixir in his hand. Fritz offers Toulon to go back with him to Germany, where they can bring Elsa back and all of Europe will provide him resources to aid her kind. After asking Leech Woman what to do, Toulon says no. Fritz shoots Leech Woman and Jester as Blade, Tunneler and Pinhead attack him. Toulon lunges at him, sending both men falling into water below. Fritz dies and Toulon manages to crawl out of the water alive but is close to death. He uses the fluid to sustain Leech Woman and Jester's lives. André dies once again, and is put back into the ground by Paul and Susan, now raising the puppets as their own children, finally coming into terms of appreciating them, just like Andre’ did.

== Canonicity ==
The first issue of In Full Color!, along with unfilmed scenes from Dave Pabian's script for Puppet Master II, were adapted into Puppet Master III: Toulon's Revenge. While the comic series and the finished film share some connections, the film highly contrasts from the comics. With the release of Puppet Master: Axis of Evil, the characters of Paul Toulon, Fritz Loemann and Hans Faulhaber are considered non-canon. The events of the comics themselves, however, are debatable in the canonicity of the franchise.
