= The Great Gilly Hopkins (film) =

- Theatrical release poster
- Directed by: Stephen Herek
- Written by: David L. Paterson
- Based on: The Great Gilly Hopkins by Katherine Paterson
- Produced by: David L. Paterson; John Paterson; William Teitler; Brian Kennedy
- Starring: Sophie Nélisse; Kathy Bates; Julia Stiles; Bill Cobbs; Billy Magnussen; Octavia Spencer; Glenn Close
- Cinematography: David M. Dunlap
- Edited by: David Leonard
- Music by: Mark Isham
- Production company: Arcady Bay Entertainment
- Distributed by: Lionsgate Premiere
- Release dates: October 6, 2015 (Schlingel); October 7, 2016 (United States)
- Running time: 99 minutes
- Country: United States
- Language: English
- Budget: $5 million
- Box office: $97,798

The Great Gilly Hopkins is a 2015 American comedy-drama film directed by Stephen Herek and adapted by David L. Paterson from Katherine Paterson's 1978 children's book. The film stars Sophie Nélisse, Kathy Bates, Julia Stiles, Bill Cobbs, Billy Magnussen, Octavia Spencer, and Glenn Close. The film was released on October 7, 2016, by Lionsgate Premiere.

== Plot ==
Galadriel "Gilly" Hopkins is the meanest girl in town: she has a birth mother she has never seen and has moved from one foster home to another. Learning that she will be sent to a new home, she wastes no time stirring up trouble. Then she meets a woman named Maime Trotter, who wants to be the mother Gilly needs. With Gilly posing a challenge, Trotter must prove a good relationship that will benefit both of them.

== Cast ==
- Sophie Nélisse as Galadriel ”Gilly” Hopkins
- Kathy Bates as Maime Trotter
- Julia Stiles as Courtney Rutherford Hopkins
- Octavia Spencer as Miss Barbara Harris
- Glenn Close as Nonnie Hopkins
- Bill Cobbs as Mr. Randolph
- Billy Magnussen as Mr. Ellis
- Clare Foley as Agnes Stokes
- Zachary Hernandez as William Ernest "W.E." Teague
- Sammy Pignalosa as Rajeem
- Toby Turner as Ticket Agent
- Frank Oz as Cookie Monster (voice)

== Production ==
On February 8, 2013, it was announced that Stephen Herek would direct an adaption of The Great Gilly Hopkins, with Kathy Bates and Danny Glover set to star in the film. On February 6, 2014, Sophie Nélisse, Glenn Close and Octavia Spencer joined the cast of the film. On May 9, 2014, Julia Stiles and Bill Cobbs joined the cast of the film. Cobbs replaced Glover, who dropped out due to scheduling conflicts. Principal photography began on April 9, 2014, and ended on June 15, 2014.

== Release ==
The film premiered on October 6, 2015, at the SCHLINGEL International Film Festival. Lionsgate Premiere acquired distribution rights, and set the film for an October 7, 2016, release.
