= The Day of the Pelican =

2009 novel by Katherine Paterson

- Author: Katherine Paterson
- Language: English
- Genre: Children's/Teen Fiction
- Publisher: Clarion Books
- Publication date: 19 October 2009
- Publication place: USA
- Pages: 160
- Awards: 2013 Laura Ingalls Wilder Medal
- ISBN: 0547181884

The Day of the Pelican is a children's novel by American author Katherine Paterson, first published by Clarion Books on October 19, 2009.

== Plot summary ==
The story follows a fictional family named the Lleshi. The Lleshis are an Albanian family living in Kosovo, which is in the midst of a war. The family suddenly finds themselves homeless refugees in the middle of a violent war. After enduring much hardship, including hunger, illness and a dangerous journey to escape their situation, they are surprised when a church group brings them to America. They find themselves in a small town in Vermont when the events of September 11, 2001 take place, placing more challenges in the path of this Muslim family.

== Reception ==
Critical reception for The Day of the Pelican has been largely positive. The Christian Science Monitor was more positive and wrote that it "does double duty as both a gripping read and a lesson in compassion and global conflict. In her quiet way, Meli is a hero, and teen readers safe from conflict themselves may marvel at her humanity."

The University of Arizona's Worlds of Words was critical of the book and of Paterson's choice to focus on an Albanian family, as they felt that she "justifies the oppression that they undergo and she does not mention what happened to Serbian and Bosnian Muslims during that horrific event in the heart of Europe. Further, by not focusing on presenting the physical torture and rape that the Muslims underwent due to ‘ethnic cleansing’ Patterson does not do justice to the actual historical events and the audience comes away with a skewed version of the actual events."
