= Of Nightingales That Weep =

1974 historical novel for children by Katherine Paterson

- First edition
- Author: Katherine Paterson
- Illustrator: Haru Wells
- Language: English
- Genre: Children's historical novel
- Publisher: Crowell
- Publication date: 1974
- Publication place: United States
- Media type: Print (hardcover)
- Pages: 170 pp (hardcover edition)
- ISBN: 978-0-690-00485-4 (hardback edition)
- OCLC: 902835
- LC Class: PZ7.P273 Of

Of Nightingales That Weep is a historical novel for children written by Katherine Paterson, published by Crowell in 1974. Set in medieval Japan, the novel tells the story of Takiko, the 11-year-old daughter of a slain samurai warrior. Takiko's mother remarries Goro, a gentle but unattractive potter/dwarf, whom Takiko fears. When she matures into adulthood, Takiko is able to find employment in the court of the Japanese emperor and falls in love with an enemy spy-Hideo. Eventually, she returns home and is able to reconcile her feelings towards Goro.

Of Nightingales That Weep won the 1994 Phoenix Award from the Children's Literature Association as the best English-language children's book that did not win a major award when it was originally published twenty years earlier. The award is named after the mythical bird phoenix, which is reborn from its ashes, to suggest the book's rise from obscurity.

== Summary ==
Set during the Genpei War, the two rival Japanese clans, the Genji and Heike, are constantly battling for the support of the Senior Cloistered Emperor and the power to rule Japan. Takiko is a beautiful girl who can talentedly play the koto, a thirteen-stringed instrument. She is only eleven years old when her samurai father nobly dies in a battle for the Heike cause. Soon after, her mother remarries a disfigured country potter named Goro. Goro is neither Genji nor Heike, and although he is physically contorted, he has a kind spirit.

At first, Takiko doesn't like Goro because of what he looks like on the outside. However, Takiko learns to see further inside Goro's true character, and begins to respect him. However, her newfound trust is tested when her mother gives birth to a son. After over a year in the country with the little boy, a merchant visits Goro's farm and takes Takiko to the capital as a lady-in-waiting to the princess. With her elevated status, she is now more respected. When visiting a temple under the princess’ vague orders, she falls in love with a Genji spy named Hideo. Because of her beauty and talented koto playing, the princess sends Takiko to the young Heike Emperor Antoku to support him through hard times with her music and mental encouragement.

Soon, several members of the Heike royal family, including Takiko, are sent into exile to escape the power-hungry Genji who are threatening to attack the city. They bring with them the Imperial Regalia, a set of objects necessary to crown a new emperor. This way, they can ensure that the Genji will not crown a new Genji emperor, and the Heike can still stay in command of Japan. All the members of the Heike party are exiled to an island because the Genji do not yet have a strong sea fleet to reach them and attack them. After a few months, the Genji make their first attack on the mountainside of the mainland. The Heike are prepared with soldiers, but they are forced to retreat. The members of the Heike royal court are rushed back to their island. After a few months, Takiko finds Hideo spying in the manor garden. After talking, Takiko lets Hideo go because of her love for him.

Soon after, when praying in a temple, Takiko discovers Hideo's secret hideout. After talking for a while, Takiko goes back to the manor of her exile. Soon, the Genji make their first attack from the sea. They bring a small fleet, and a few hundred skilled soldiers. They then set fire to the area surrounding the manor. The Heike are petrified as they board warships and begin fighting. After losing confidence, the Heike retreat.

Soon, the lead Heike general comes up with a plan to destroy the Genji. However, his plan fails, and the Heike are captured. Several members of the Heike nobility, including the Emperor, jump overboard before being captured to avoid humiliation. After Takiko escapes with Hideo's help, she returns to Goro. She finds out that when she was gone, her mother and brother died of sickness. Takiko starts to work in the fields and loses much of her beauty because of her filthy feet, her frostbitten hands, and her brittle hair. Worst of all, she has a huge burn on her face because of an accident with Goro. Her callused hands prevent her from playing the koto as beautifully as she did before. When Hideo comes to visit Takiko, he sees Takiko's loss of beauty. Feeling that his life has no more meaning, he says farewell to Takiko for the last time. Takiko, knowing that no one would wish to marry someone as ugly as her, marries Goro and has a baby daughter.
