= The Great Gilly Hopkins =

1978 children's novel by Katherine Paterson

- Second edition
- Author: Katherine Paterson
- Genre: Children's novel
- Publisher: Thomas Y. Crowell Co.
- Publication date: March 28, 1978
- Publication place: United States
- Media type: Print (hardcover and paperback)
- Pages: 148 pp. (first edition)
- ISBN: 978-0064402019
- OCLC: 3542211
- LC Class: PZ7.P273 Gr

The Great Gilly Hopkins is a 1978 realistic children's novel by American author Katherine Paterson. It won the National Book Award for Children's Books in 1979, Patterson's second award in three years (1977). In 2012, it was ranked number 63 among all-time children's novels in a survey published by School Library Journal – the third of three books by Paterson in the top 100.

A film adaptation starring Sophie Nélisse as Gilly Hopkins and Kathy Bates as Trotter was released in 2015.

The novel has been translated into Catalan, Chinese, Danish, Dutch, Finnish, French, German, Greek, Hungarian, Italian, Japanese, Korean, Lithuanian, Norwegian, Polish, Russian, Slovak, Spanish, and Swedish. Árpád Göncz's Hungarian translation has been adapted into a radio play, with Zsófi Jávor playing Gilly and Márta Fónay playing Trotter.

== Plot summary ==
Galadriel "Gilly" Hopkins is a mean, unfriendly 11-year-old girl who is headed for yet another foster home. She hates living with different people all the time and just wants to settle in with her birth mother, Courtney Rutherford Hopkins, whose photograph Gilly secretly treasures. Gilly doesn't like the look of her new foster mom, Mrs. Trotter, a "fat hippo", and decides she is going to hate her whole life.

Gilly hatches a plan to escape from Trotter and steals the money she needs for it to work. She knows that her mother lives in San Francisco, California, so she writes a letter to Courtney saying that her beloved Galadriel will be with her soon. When Gilly escapes the first time, she gets caught by the police, and Trotter immediately comes down to the station to retrieve her. Gilly's grandmother, Nonnie, comes to Trotter's house and tells her that she will take Gilly home. Nonnie was previously unaware that she had a granddaughter. By this time, Gilly realizes that she really wants to be with Trotter. However, the law says that Gilly must go with Nonnie, so she goes to Nonnie's house.

Then Gilly gets good news: her mother is coming. But when she goes to the airport, Courtney is not the woman in Gilly's photograph: she has stringy hair and a lot of other traits Gilly didn't expect, like being selfish. Gilly also finds out that her mother only came because Nonnie paid her, not because she wanted to come. She realizes for the first time how foolish she has been and that she actually loves Trotter. The story ends with Gilly on the phone, crying to Trotter to take her back. Trotter, in turn, gently convinces her that her home is with Nonnie.

== Characters ==
- Maime M. Trotter, simply called "Trotter", is Gilly's new foster mother. She is a large woman who wears glasses and lives in a messy, small, cramped house. Trotter is said to be one of the foster care system's most respected caregivers.
- William Ernest Teague is Gilly's foster brother at Trotter's home. He is seven years old, with brown hair and glasses, and has a nervous disposition. When people make sudden movements around him he often ducks, as if he is expecting to be hit. Gilly initially enjoys tormenting William Ernest, but eventually grows to like him and helps him with his reading. She also helps teach him to defend himself from mean bullies. Gilly sometimes calls him W.E.
- Ms. Ellis is Gilly's social worker. She has known Gilly for some time and has shuttled her back and forth to various foster homes.
- Mr. Randolph is Mrs. Trotter's next-door neighbor. He is blind, widowed and lives alone in a house with an impressive library of books. Mr. Randolph is good friends with Trotter and joins her every night for supper. One of Gilly's jobs at Trotter's home is to escort Mr. Randolph to and from his house.
- Courtney Rutherford Hopkins is Gilly's biological mother. She is a former flower child, and has not seen or lived with her daughter for most of her life, although she does send Gilly an occasional postcard. Gilly's most prized possession is an old photograph of her mother, which has been inscribed to her.
- Nonnie Hopkins is Gilly's maternal grandmother and Courtney's mother. She is not aware of Gilly's existence until Courtney writes to her, asking her to assume custody. Her other child, Chadwell, died while serving in the Vietnam War.
- Agnes Stokes is a girl at Gilly's school. She comes from a troubled background herself, having been abandoned by both of her parents, and lives with her grandmother. She hangs around Gilly and tries to win her friendship. Gilly dislikes her but uses her to help steal Mr. Randolph's money.
- Miss Barbara Harris is Gilly's sixth-grade teacher. Initially, Gilly has a very difficult time interacting with her. Eventually, she learns to like Miss Harris and begins to do well in school. After she moves to Virginia, Gilly remains in contact with Miss Harris, writing to her to discuss the Lord of the Rings books. Miss Harris says that she and Gilly are very much alike, because of their angry nature.
- Melvin Trotter is Maime's late husband.
- Miss Minnie Applegate is Gilly and W.E.'s elderly catechist, who refuses to tell her pupils what adultery is.

== Reception ==
The Great Gilly Hopkins won various major accolades:

- Newbery Medal Honor (1979)
- National Book Award in category Children's Literature (1979)
- Christopher Award (1979)
- Jane Addams Award Nominee (1979)
- National Book Award Finalist for Children's Books (Paperback) (1980)
- Dorothy Canfield Fisher Children's Book Award Nominee (1980)
- Georgia Children's Books: 1966–1978 (1981)
- Massachusetts Children's Book Award (1981)
- Iowa Children's Choice Award (1981)
- California Young Readers Medal Nominee for Intermediate (1981)
- William Allen White Children's Book Award (1981)
- Notable Children's Recordings (1998)

The book has been a frequent target of censors; the novel appears on the American Library Association list of the 100 Most Frequently Challenged Books between 1990 and 1999 (20), as well as between 2000 and 2009 (52).

== Adaptations ==
=== Film adaptation ===
On February 8, 2013, it was announced that Stephen Herek would direct a film adaptation of the book, with Kathy Bates as Trotter and Danny Glover in major roles. On February 6, 2014, Sophie Nélisse as Gilly Hopkins, Glenn Close and Octavia Spencer joined the cast of the film. On May 9, 2014, Julia Stiles and Bill Cobbs joined the cast of the film. Principal photography began on April 9, 2014, and ended on June 15, 2014. The film premiered at the SCHLINGEL International Film Festival October 6, 2015, and was released by Lionsgate Premiere on October 7, 2016.

=== Stage adaptation ===
The novel was adapted as a children's stage musical in 1996 and is available for licensing through Samuel French.

=== Television adaptation ===
The novel was adapted as a made-for-TV movie produced by Hanna-Barbera Productions was televised January 19, 1981, directed by Jeffrey Hayden and teleplay by Charles Pratt Jr. during CBS Afternoon Playhouse.
