= David L. Paterson =

American screenwriter (born 1968)

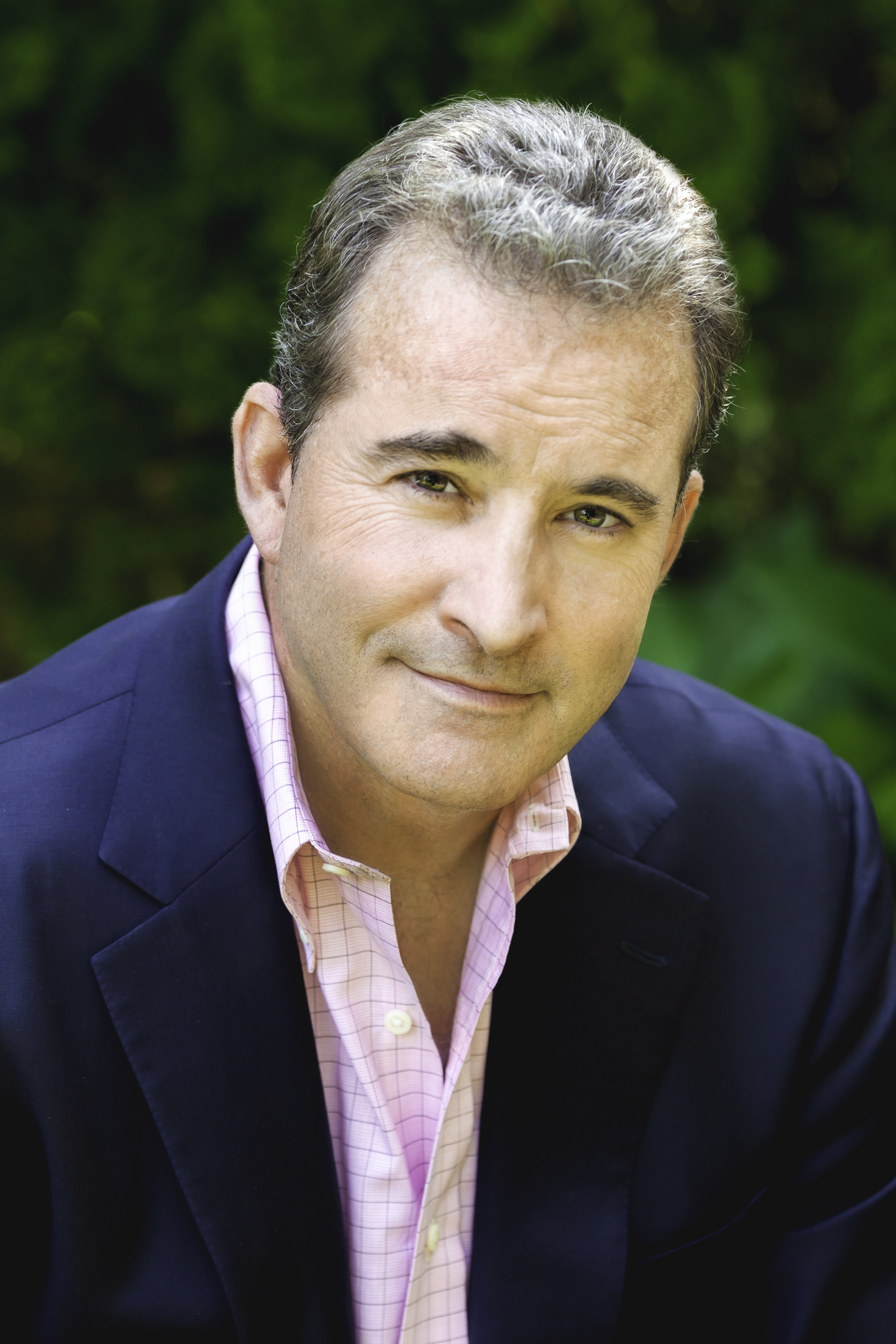
David L. Paterson in 2008

David Lord Paterson (born 1966) is an American screenwriter, actor, stuntman and producer.

In August 1974, David's best friend, eight-year-old Lisa Hill, was struck by lightning and killed. His mother, author Katherine Paterson, used this real-life experience as the basis for her children's novel Bridge to Terabithia. David produced and co-wrote the screenplay for the film adaptation of the novel released in 2007.

He graduated from The Catholic University of America (CUA) in 1989 with a BA. Paterson held a special advance screening of Bridge to Terabithia on February 1, 2007, for members of the CUA community at the AFI Silver Theatre in Silver Spring, Maryland.

As a playwright, Paterson has published over one dozen titles with Samuel French, Inc.. He holds the record for being the only playwright ever to have three plays premiere on New York stages within one month.

In December 2012, Paterson ran a write-in campaign for Park District Commissioner of Manhasset, and won against the Incumbent. He has been re-elected three more times.

In 2013 David was a stunt double for Robin Williams in The Angriest Man in Brooklyn and performed stunts for him in his place.

In the Fall of 2016, his feature film, The Great Gilly Hopkins, based on another book written by his mother, opened in US theaters. The film starred Kathy Bates, Bill Cobbs, and Sophie Nélisse.

In June 2024, David's documentary The Girl Who Wore Freedom, will open on screens in 100 cities throughout the USA, marking the 80th Anniversary of D-Day.
