= Puppet Master (Action Lab Comics) =

- The puppets are in the stage of Mr. Roger's Neighborhood of Make-Believe.

Publication information
- Publisher: Action Lab Comics
- Schedule: Monthly
- Format: Ongoing series
- Genre: Horror
- Publication date: March 1, 2015–January 17, 2018
- No. of issues: 23
- Main character(s): (See List)

Creative team
- Written by: Shawn Gabborin
- Penciller(s): Michela Da Sacco; Daniel J. Logan; Robert Hack; Kelly Williams; Andrew Magnum; Gene Jimenenz; Daniel J. Logan; Robert Hack; Gene Jimenez
- Inker(s): Daniel J. Logan; Andrew Mangum; Robert Hack; Michela Da Sacco
- Colorist(s): Yann Perrelet; Kelly Williams

Puppet Master is a comic book series written by Shawn Gabborin and published monthly by Action Lab Comics. It is the continuing story of the puppets created by André Toulon.

== Plot ==
In the story, a group of friends using the abandoned Bodega Bay Inn as a party spot are attacked by Blade, Pinhead, and other puppets.

When a group of friends sets out to use the abandoned Bodega Bay Inn as a party spot, they find out first-hand that the bizarre local folklore is more truth than fantasy as an army of twisted autonomous Puppets have their way with the trespassing teens!

The Bodega Bay party goes sour when a dead body turns up. Now, as the remaining teens search the Inn for their missing friends, the Puppets increase the body count! But are the Puppets working on their own accord or is there a new Master in the shadows? The Puppets are back, and they're out for blood!

== Storylines ==
- The Offering (Puppet Master issues 1 - 3)
- Rebirth (Puppet Master issues 4 - 7)
- Halloween 1988 (Puppet Master Halloween Special #1)
- Boy of Wood (Puppet Master issues 8 -11)
- Blood Debt (Puppet Master issues 12-15)
- Vacancy (Puppet Master issues 16-18)
- Halloween 1989 "The Creature" (Puppet Master Halloween Special #2)
- Retro Now (Puppet Master issues 19-20)
- Curtain Call (Puppet Master issues 21-23)

== Collected editions ==
The first three issues of Puppet Mastery have been collected in the following trade paperbacks:

Title	Material collected	ISBN	Release date
Puppet Master Vol. 1: The Offering	Puppet Master #1–3	978-1632291073	2015-19-10
Puppet Master Vol. 2: Rebirth	Puppet Master #4–7	978-1632291141	2015-31-12
Puppet Master Vol. 3: The Wooden Boy	Puppet Master #8–11	978-1632291622	2016-07-07
Puppet Master Vol. 4: Blood Debt	Puppet Master #12–15	978-1632291912	2016-14-09
Puppet Master Vol. 5: Vacancy	Puppet Master #16–18	978-1632292179	2016-21-12
Puppet Master Vol. 6: Curtain Call	Puppet Master: Curtain Call #1–3	978-1632293183	2018-20-02
