= Bridge to Terabithia (novel) =

1977 children's novel by Katherine Paterson

- First edition
- Author: Katherine Paterson
- Illustrator: Donna Diamond
- Language: English
- Genre: Children's novel
- Publisher: Thomas Y. Crowell Co.
- Publication date: October 21, 1977
- Publication place: United States
- ISBN: 978-0-690-01359-7 (hardback edition)
- LC Class: PZ7.P273 Br

Bridge to Terabithia is a children's novel written by American author Katherine Paterson. The book was originally published in 1977 by Thomas Crowell, and won a Newbery Medal the year after.

The novel tells the story of fifth-grader Jesse Aarons, who becomes friends with his new neighbor, Leslie Burke, after he loses a footrace to her at school. Leslie is a tomboy from a wealthy family, and Jesse thinks highly of her. Jesse is an artistic boy from a poorer family who, in the beginning, is fearful and angry. After meeting Leslie, however, his life is transformed. He becomes courageous and learns to let go of his frustration. The two children create a kingdom for themselves, which Leslie names 'Terabithia'.

Paterson drew inspiration for the novel from a real event that occurred in August 1974 when her son's friend was struck and killed by lightning. The novel's content has been the frequent target of censorship and appears at number eight on the American Library Association list of the 100 Most Frequently Challenged Books for the decade 1990–2000.

It has been adapted for the screen twice: a 1985 PBS TV movie and a 2007 Disney/Walden Media feature film.

== Background ==
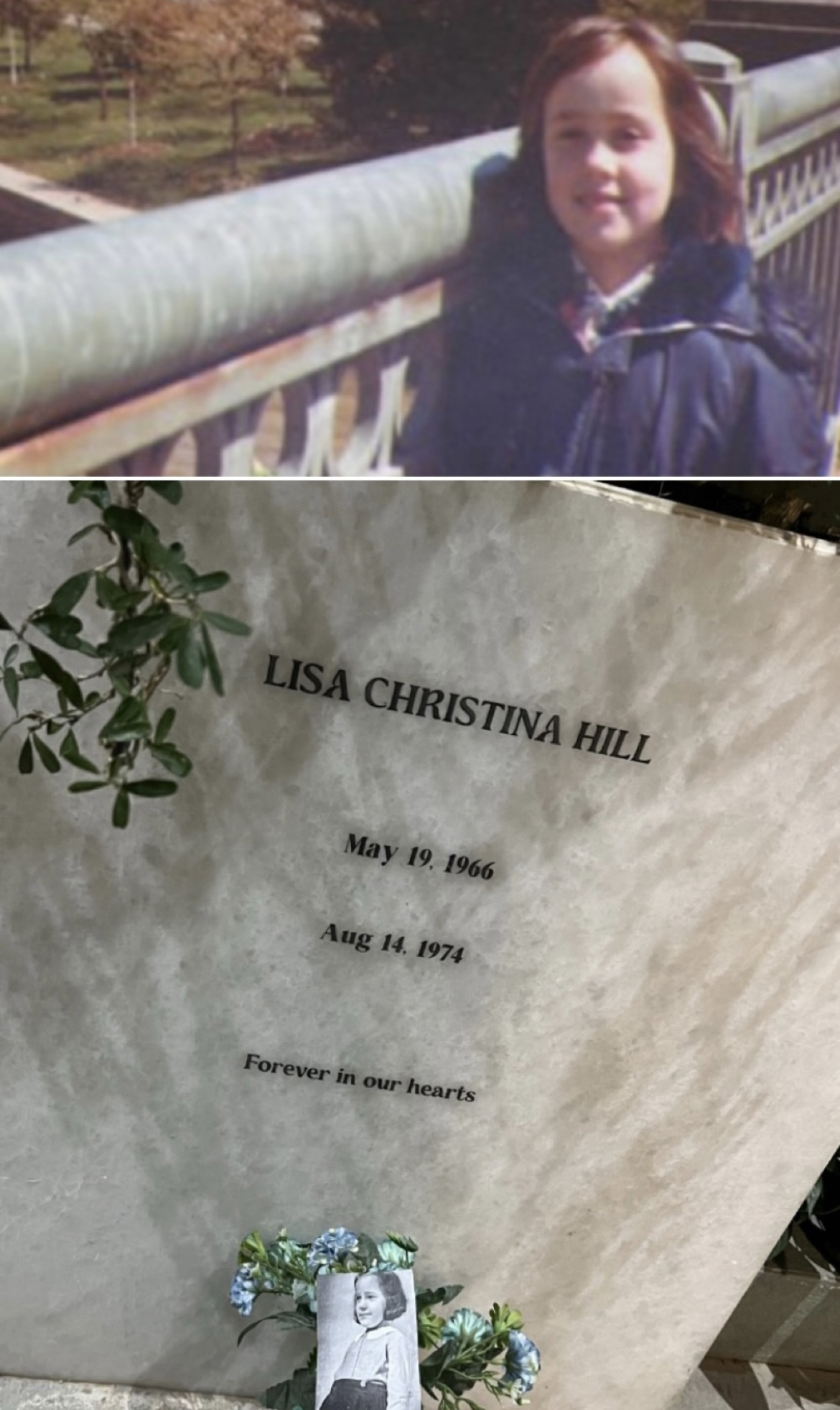
Lisa Christina Hill (1966–1974), the girl who inspired the novel

Katherine Paterson lived for a time in Takoma Park, Maryland, a suburb of Washington, D.C. The novel was inspired by an incident during that time: on August 14, 1974, her son David's best friend, Lisa Christina Hill, died after being struck by lightning in Bethany Beach, Delaware, aged eight.

The name of the imaginary kingdom is similar to that of the Narnian island Terebinthia, created by C. S. Lewis in 1951 or earlier for Prince Caspian and The Voyage of the Dawn Treader. Paterson observed in 2005:

I thought I'd made up "Terabithia". I realized when the book was nearly done, that there is an island in "The Voyage of the Dawn Treader" by C. S. Lewis called Terebinthia. I'm sure I borrowed that unconsciously, but, then, so would Leslie who loved the Chronicles of Narnia. And, by the way, Lewis got Terebinthia from the Biblical terebinth tree, so it wasn't original with him either.

The novel makes a direct reference to The Chronicles of Narnia as a series of books Leslie lends to Jess, in order to help him learn to behave like a king.

== Plot ==
Ten-year-old Jess Aarons lives in rural Lark Creek, Virginia with his dad, his nagging mother, and his four sisters. Jess has trained all summer to be the fastest runner in his rural school by waking up early every morning to run before he has to milk the cow. Secretly, he also wants to be an artist and loves to draw but his father disapproves. He has a crush on the school music teacher, Miss Edmunds, the only person who encourages him to draw.

One day, a family moves into the neighboring house and farm known as the old Perkins place. Jess’ younger sister, May Belle, hopes the new family will have a girl her age to play with but Jess's new neighbor proves to be a girl his age, Leslie Burke, a tomboy with a wealthy family from Arlington, Virginia. She introduces herself to Jess. On the first day of school, Leslie turns out to be in Jess’ class and their teacher is the elderly Mrs. Myers. During recess, the boys have race tryouts and Leslie forces her way in and outruns everyone. The other boys are shocked and races are then cancelled afterwards. The other students mock Leslie for being a straight A teacher's pet and for not owning a television. Jess initially ignores her, but he changes his mind about her during Miss Edmunds's music class one day and they start talking. They play after school by a dry creek behind Leslie's house where farmland turns into the woods. They pretend they are the king and queen of a hidden magical kingdom, Terabithia, that can be entered only by swinging over the creek bed on an old rope.

As Jess and Leslie's friendship grows, they take to Terabithia as an escape from the real world and use it to cope with the struggles in their daily lives. When Jess takes home a puppy against his father's will, Leslie offers to raise him, naming him Prince Terrien. Another incident arises when Janice Avery, the seventh grade bully, steals May Belle's Twinkies; Jess and Leslie enact revenge by forging a love letter from the boy she likes, leaving her humiliated when he does not show up for a date. However, months later, Leslie hears Janice crying in the bathroom. When Jess convinces Leslie to help Janice, Janice tells her that she is abusively beaten by her father, and her so-called "friends" have just gossiped about it to the entire school. Leslie comforts Janice by telling her that everyone will forget about it in a week. One night, May Belle tells Jess that she followed him and Leslie to the creek. He makes her swear never to follow them again nor to tell their mother.

At Easter, during spring break, Jess invites Leslie to go to church with his family. Leslie enjoys the experience. While she calls the story of Jesus "beautiful", she also questions it. This upsets May Belle, who believes God will damn Leslie to hell when she dies. That week, rain turns the dry creek bed into a rushing river. While Jess is too scared to swing over the river, Leslie remains unafraid. That night, Jess plans on telling Leslie he does not want to swing over to Terabithia until the rain lets up. Before he can, the next morning, Miss Edmunds calls Jess and invites him to go with her to Washington, D.C. to visit the Smithsonian Museum.

Jess arrives home to find his family crying around their kitchen table, thinking he is dead. They reveal that Leslie died earlier in the morning after swinging on the rope, which had broken, causing her to hit her head and drown in the river. At Leslie's funeral, her father, Bill, tells Jess what a wonderful friend he was to her. The Burkes plan to move out of the old Perkins place now that Leslie has passed on. They give Jess all of Leslie's old art supplies, but Jess angrily throws them into the river. He worriedly asks his father whether Leslie is in hell; his father assures him she is not. One morning, a few days after the funeral, Jess crosses the stream to Terabithia using a large branch, where he makes a funeral wreath for Leslie. May Belle, who has followed him, makes it halfway across the branch before becoming too scared to continue. Jess guides her back to land.

The following Monday after spring break, Mrs. Myers speaks to Jess privately and tells him that when her husband died, people tried to make her forget, but she did not want to. She is gentler to him and mourns Leslie, describing her as a wonderful student and person. One day, using scrap lumber left behind by the Burkes, Jess builds a bridge across the dry creek bed. He takes May Belle across the bridge and begins to play in Terabithia, with her its new queen.

== Characters ==
- Jesse Aarons – In the beginning of the novel, he is habitually fearful, angry and depressed due to his family struggles. He also has a crush on his music teacher, Miss Edmunds, which plays an integral role in the final events of the story. After meeting and then ultimately losing Leslie, he is transformed, in that he becomes courageous and lets go of his anger and frustration.
- Leslie Burke – An intelligent, talented, imaginative, outgoing girl, it is she who creates the imaginary kingdom of Terabithia. Her talents include gymnastics, creative writing, swimming and running. Jesse thinks highly of her, and they are loyal friends. She is a newcomer to his school, and not socially accepted by the other students. She dies when she falls into the creek Jesse and Leslie used to cross into Terabithia after the rope snaps, sustaining a head injury that keeps her unconscious until she drowns.
- May Belle Aarons – One of Jesse's younger sisters. She is described as the only one of his siblings with whom he feels close. However, because she is six years to his 10, she does not fit the mold of the ideal confidante to him, leaving him still desperate for companionship. She is closest to him from the beginning, and like him, feels that she does not have a place in the family. She is the first of his sisters to learn about Terabithia, and becomes the queen after Leslie's death. She is welcomed to the kingdom due to being the only family member who shows compassion for him throughout.
- Ellie and Brenda Aarons – Jesse's two older sisters. They are never mentioned separately within the novel and are rarely portrayed in a positive light. They continually ask for favors from their mother and boss their younger siblings around. It is only near the climax of the story, after hearing of Leslie's death, that they express some concern for their brother.
- Joyce Ann Aarons – Jesse's four-year-old youngest sister. She is mainly tended to by the mother and has no significant role in the story, but as May Belle describes her, she is "nothing but a baby".
- Janice Avery – The school bully at Lark Creek. She is very overweight and tends to become very offended when people tease her for being so. Janice has a crush on Willard Hughes, which Jesse and Leslie use to trick her. Her father beats her and she secretly smokes. Also, her face is used on the giant troll living in Terabithia for the 2007 movie.
- Miss Edmunds – The somewhat unconventional and controversial music teacher, whom Jesse greatly admires. Edmunds invites him to go to the Smithsonian Museum, which leads Leslie to go to Terabithia by herself. As a result, Leslie is alone when she falls from the rope and drowns.
- Prince Terrien – A puppy that Jesse gave Leslie for Christmas. He is the guardian and court jester of Terabithia. He is referred to as P.T. for short.
- Gary Fulcher – He and Jesse both hope to be the fastest kid in the fifth grade; he serves as another bully in the story, but he is not quite as mean as Janice Avery.
- Mrs. Myers – Jesse and Leslie's teacher. Given the nickname "Monster Mouth Myers". She favors Leslie, and tells Jesse after Leslie's death that she was the best student Myers had ever had. Her husband had also died, and she explains to Jesse a little about grief from her own experience.
- William and Judith (Hancock) Burke – Leslie's parents, novelists who come to the story's location for their work. Mother—book writer, Father—political writer. Unlike most of the locals, they do not watch or own a television. Leslie calls William and Judith "Bill and Judy", respectively.

== Reception ==
At the time of the book's publication, Kirkus Reviews said, "Paterson, who has already earned regard with her historical fiction set in Japan, proves to be just as eloquent and assured when dealing with contemporary American children—and Americans of very different backgrounds at that." Children's author Jean Fritz wrote in The New York Times, "With great skill Mrs. Paterson takes Jess to the depths of this nightmare and then brings him back, along with all he has learned in Terabithia—a survivor and certainly equal to the demands." According to The Horn Book Magazine, "Jess and his family are magnificently characterized; the book abounds in descriptive vignettes, humorous sidelights on the clash of cultures, and realistic depictions of rural school life. The symbolism of falling and of building bridges forms a theme throughout the story, which is one of remarkable richness and depth, beautifully written." In a retrospective essay about the Newbery Medal-winning books from 1976 to 1985, literary critic Zena Sutherland wrote of Bridge to Terabithia, "The poignant story is all the more effective because Paterson lets Jesse express his grief and guilt rather than telling readers that he feels them. There is no glossing-over; nor is there a reaching for dramatic effect."

== Literary significance ==
The novel's content has been the frequent target of censors. It ranks number 8 on the American Library Association (ALA) list of most commonly challenged books in the United States for 1990–1999. On the ALA list for 2000–2009 it ranks No. 28. The challenges stem from death being a part of the plot; Jesse's frequent use of the word "lord" outside of prayer; allegations that it promotes secular humanism, New Age religion, occultism, and Satanism; and for use of offensive language.

The novel is often featured in English studies classes in Ireland, Singapore, Australia, New Zealand, Canada, the Philippines, Ecuador, the United Kingdom, Costa Rica, Panama, South Africa and the United States.

In 2012, the novel was ranked number ten among all-time best children's novels in a survey published by School Library Journal, a monthly with primarily U.S. audience. Two other books by Paterson made the top 100.

== Adaptations ==
In 1979, Miller-Brody Productions recorded a dramatization of the book for Newbery Award Records. Narrated by Russell Horton, the dramatization featured Karen Dahle as Miss Edmunds, Donna Elio as Brenda, Michael Ferguson as a disembodied voice, Rebecca Leigh as Leslie, Denise Moses as Ellie, Ray Owens as Bill, Tim Rail as Jess, Adele Ronson as Mrs. Myers, Chris Shulman as Gary Fulcher, Ray Thorne as Dad, Billie Lou Watt as Momma and Terren Wein as May Belle.

Two films have been made based on the novel, both with the original title. One was a PBS TV movie made in 1985, starring Annette O'Toole, Julian Coutts, and Julie Beaulieu.

The second was a theatrical film released on February 16, 2007, directed by the co-creator of Nickelodeon's Rugrats and former Hanna-Barbera animator Gabor Csupo and starring Josh Hutcherson, AnnaSophia Robb, Robert Patrick, Bailee Madison, and Zooey Deschanel; the adaptation was done in part by David Paterson himself. While the giant troll was adapted, the Dark Master, Squogres (a race of squirrel/ogre-like creatures), Hairy Vultures, and many unidentified creatures were created for the film.

A musical stage adaptation ("supported by a lyrical score") entitled The Bridge to Terabithia is listed for sale by Stageplays.com, credited to Paterson and Stephanie S. Tolan, another children's writer. It was catalogued by the Library of Congress in 1993, with primary credit to Steve Liebman for the music, as Bridge to Terabithia: a play with music (New York: S. French, c1992).

== See also ==
- Beat the Turtle Drum
- Waiting To Dive

Awards
Preceded by Roll of Thunder, Hear My Cry	Newbery Medal recipient 1978	Succeeded by The Westing Game
