= The Master Puppeteer =

1975 historical children's novel by Katherine Paterson

- First edition
- Author: Katherine Paterson
- Illustrator: Haru Wells
- Language: English
- Genre: Children's literature, historical novel
- Publisher: Thomas Y. Crowell
- Publication date: 1975
- Publication place: United States
- Media type: Print (hardcover)
- Pages: 179 pp (hardcover edition)
- ISBN: 978-0-690-00913-2
- OCLC: 1257048
- LC Class: PZ7.P273 Mas

The Master Puppeteer (1975) is a historical novel for children by American author Katherine Paterson. It won the 1977 U.S. National Book Award in category Children's Literature.

== Synopsis ==
Thirteen-year-old Jiro finds himself caught up in the political events of late eighteenth-century Osaka, Japan when he accompanies his father, Hanji, to deliver a puppet to the Hanaza theater. Yoshida, the owner and master puppeteer, offers to take the boy on as an apprentice. To Jiro's chagrin, his mother, Isako, does not take Yoshida's offer seriously. Determined not to be a burden on his family during the current famine, Jiro runs away to the theater, where he becomes an apprentice. He begins his career by opening curtains and memorizing scripts and eventually graduates to a role as a “foot operator.” Along the way, he is helped by an older boy, Yoshida's son, Kinshi, who does not seem able to please his father.

Worried about his father, who is said to be ill, Jiro briefly returns home to discover that Isako has taken his father to recuperate at a relative's farm in Kyoto. When Jiro again returns home on New Year's Day, he discovers that his mother is near starvation, and when he returns to the Hanaza he realizes he forgot to pray. One evening, Saburo, the mysterious bandit who steals from the rich to help the poor, leaves a notice on the door of the theater demanding a special performance of the current play, “The Thief of the Tokaido.”

Jiro later finds the sword that Saburo used for the performance day special on the second floor of the storage room, a shed-like room with walls lined with puppets which is off-limits. He asks the theater's reciter, Okada, for advice on whether to give the sword to Kinshi as an opportunity to talk to Saburo, who was believed to be Yoshida. Okada later tells Jiro that he is Saburo. Isako and Okada eventually agree to exchange the boys - Jiro to remain with Okada and the theatre, while Kinshi will stay with Isako on the farm - and live a happy life.

== Characters ==
- Jiro: The protagonist who apprentices himself at the Hanaza; he is a clumsy 13-year-old. He was cursed when he was born. He is always very hungry.
- Hanji: Jiro's father, a craftsman who makes puppets for a living; he is utmost serene. He betrayed his family later on in the story.
- Isako: Jiro's grouchy mother; she blames Jiro for the deaths of his two brothers and sister.
- Yoshida: the puppet master of the Hanaza; he has a nasty attitude, and beats Kinshi with a bamboo stick. Jiro accuses him of being Saburo, but towards the end of the story, we find out he really isn't.
- Kinshi: Yoshida's son who tutors Jiro in the way of the puppet.
- "Saburo": Robin-Hood-like figure who robs from the rich and gives to the poor.
- Taro: Jiro's neighbor's son, Jiro finds Taro at Jiro's house when his parents are gone.
- Mochida: A man who works at the theater; chief left-handed operator; oversees the chores and practices of the other boys. Strict but kind.
- Okada: the blind, wise reciter at Hanaza, later revealed to be the so-called "Saburo" is the thief that steals from the rich to give to the poor.
- Teiji: a young apprentice who stutters and is hated by Yoshida.
