= Bridge to Terabithia (2007 film) =

2007 film by Gábor Csupó

- Theatrical release poster
- Directed by: Gábor Csupó
- Screenplay by: David L. Paterson; Jeff Stockwell
- Based on: Bridge to Terabithia by Katherine Paterson
- Produced by: David L. Paterson; Lauren Levine; Hal Lieberman
- Starring: Josh Hutcherson; AnnaSophia Robb; Robert Patrick; Zooey Deschanel
- Cinematography: Michael Chapman
- Edited by: John Gilbert
- Music by: Aaron Zigman
- Production companies: Walden Media; Hal Lieberman Company; Lauren Levine Productions Inc.
- Distributed by: Buena Vista Pictures Distribution (United States) (Note: Distributed under the Walt Disney Pictures banner.); Summit Entertainment (International)
- Release date: February 16, 2007
- Running time: 95 minutes
- Country: United States
- Language: English
- Budget: $17 million
- Box office: $137.6 million

Bridge to Terabithia is a 2007 American fantasy film directed by Gábor Csupó (in his directorial debut) from a screenplay by David L. Paterson and Jeff Stockwell. It is based on the 1977 novel by Katherine Paterson and stars Josh Hutcherson, AnnaSophia Robb, Zooey Deschanel, and Robert Patrick. In the film, adolescent children Jess Aarons (Hutcherson) and Leslie Burke (Robb) create "Terabithia", a fantasy world, which they use to cope with their troubled reality and spend their free time together.

The original novel was based on events from the childhood of Paterson's son, who went on to write the film's screenplay; Csupó was hired in late 2005, and the rest of the main cast was rounded out soon after. Principal photography began in February 2006 and lasted until that April, taking place in Auckland. This was the last film for 71-year-old cinematographer Michael Chapman, who followed through with his planned retirement thereafter.

Bridge to Terabithia was released in the United States on February 16, 2007, by Walt Disney Pictures. It received positive reviews from critics, with praise for its visuals, cast performances, and faithfulness to the source material. The film grossed $137.6 million worldwide. At the 29th Young Artist Awards, the film won all five awards for which it was nominated.

== Plot ==
Jess Aarons is a 12-year-old aspiring artist living with his financially struggling family in Lark Creek. He rides the bus to school with his younger sister, May Belle, and is often bullied by two boys, Scott Hoager and Gary Fulcher, and eighth grader Janice Avery. One day, due to their struggles, his mother Mary, forces him to wear his older sister's sneakers. At school, Jess meets a new student named Leslie Burke. At recess, he almost wins a running event, for which he has been training at home. Leslie also enters and beats Jess, frustrating him. On the way home, Jess and Leslie learn they are next-door neighbors.

Jess has a difficult relationship with his strict father Jack, who spends more time with May Belle. One day at school, Leslie compliments Jess's drawing talent, and they become friends. After school, Jess and Leslie venture into the woods and swing across a creek on a rope. They find an abandoned treehouse on the other side and invent a new world, which they call Terabithia. For the next few days, Jess and Leslie spend their free time in the treehouse, getting to know each other and growing closer.

Leslie gives Jess an art kit on his birthday. Jess becomes angry with Jack for his attitude towards him and he loses his belief, refusing Terabithia's existence the next day at school. Leslie becomes frustrated by Janice's bullying. Later, Jess apologizes to Leslie by giving her a puppy, whom she names Prince Terrien (P.T.). Once in Terabithia, they encounter various creatures, created by their imagination, including a giant troll resembling Janice. At school, Jess and Leslie play a prank on Janice, embarrassing her in front of everyone on the bus. Leslie introduces Jess to her parents, and they help paint their house. At school, Leslie discovers from Janice that her bullying is due to her abusive father, and the two become friends, with Janice later befriending Jess as well. Jess, Leslie and P.T. return to Terabithia, where they fight off many creatures resembling their bullies, this time with the troll as their ally.

The next morning, Ms. Edmunds, the music teacher whom Jess has a crush on, calls to invite him on a one-on-one field trip to an art museum. When Jess returns home, Jack reveals that Leslie died after hitting her head and drowning in the creek when the rope they used snapped. Jess first denies it and runs to check on Leslie, but he notices emergency vehicles surrounding her house.

The following day, Jess and his parents visit the Burke family to pay their respects. Leslie's father, Bill, tells Jess she loved him and thanks him for being the best friend she ever had, since she never had friends at her old school. When he returns to school, the bus driver gives his condolences. But in class, Scott makes fun of Leslie's death, and Jess punches him for it. His teacher, Mrs. Myers, instead of punishing Jess, comforts him when she compares it to her husband's death. After school, Gary knocks Jess down, but Janice sticks up for Jess by punching Gary herself.

Jess feels overwhelming guilt for Leslie's death and refuses to believe it. After seeing the severed rope and crossing a fallen tree, he thinks he hears her voice calling him for help, but it turns out to be May Belle. He saves her from falling off the tree, but he then tells her to go home and pushes her to the ground. Forced to accept Leslie's death, he imagines Jack as the "Dark Master" from Terabithia chasing after him before breaking down into tears, but Jack comforts and consoles him by telling him to keep Leslie's memory alive. Jess decides to re-imagine Terabithia and builds a bridge across the river to welcome a new ruler. He finally invites May Belle to Terabithia, and the siblings agree to rule together, with Jess as king and May Belle as a princess.

== Cast ==
- Josh Hutcherson as Jess Aarons, a 6th grader and an aspiring artist.
- AnnaSophia Robb as Leslie Burke, a 6th grade girl whom Jess befriends.
- Bailee Madison as May Belle Aarons, the little sister of Jess.
- Zooey Deschanel as Ms. Edmunds, a music teacher that Jess likes.
- Robert Patrick as Jack Aarons, the father of Jess and May Belle.
- Kate Butler as Mary Aarons, the mother of Jess and May Belle.
- Devon Wood as Brenda Aarons, the older sister of Jess and May Belle.
- Emma Fenton as Ellie Aarons, the older sister of Jess and May Belle.
- Grace Brannigan as Joyce Aarons, the baby sister of Jess and May Belle.
- Latham Gaines as Bill Burke, the father of Leslie.
- Judy McIntosh as Judy Burke, the mother of Leslie.
- Patricia Aldersley as Grandma Burke, the grandmother of Leslie.
- Lauren Clinton as Janice Avery, a bully, later friend, of Jess and Leslie who serves as the inspiration to the giant troll.
- Isabelle Kircher as Carla
- Cameron Wakefield as Scott Hoager, one of Jess's bullies who serves as the inspiration to the squirrel-like Squogres.
- Elliot Lawless as Gary Fulcher, one of Jess's bullies who serves as the inspiration to the hairy vultures.
- Carly Owen as Madison
- Jen Wolfe as Mrs. Myers, a teacher.
- James Gaylyn as Principal Turner
- Ian Harcourt as Kenny, a bus driver.
- Phil Grieve as Mr. Bailey
- Matt Gibbons as the Dark Master, an evil being in Terabithia that antagonizes Jess and Leslie.
- Paddy as Prince Terrien, a dog that is adopted by the Burke family.

== Production ==
=== Development ===
The film was directed by Nickelodeon's Rugrats co-creator and ex-Hanna-Barbera animator Gábor Csupó, who was first recommended for the job by Walden Media President Cary Granat. Although Csupó had never worked on a live-action film before, it "didn't worry Granat in the least". Csupó stated that he was interested in making the film because he "had the ambition to do a live-action film for a long time", but that he "didn't like anything until I read this book". He described the book as "beautiful" and said that it "moved [him]". Bridge to Terabithia was cinematographer Michael Chapman's final film before his retirement. Chapman mentioned in the film's DVD commentary that he retired after shooting this film because he wanted his last film to be a good one; "this is such a beautiful story, and it's exactly the kind of movie I want to do at this time in my life".

The film was originally placed in development at 20th Century Fox, following a five-picture deal between the company and Walden in July 2004. However, in January 2006, Walden announced that the film would be instead co-produced with Walt Disney Pictures, while Summit Entertainment would handle international sales.

=== Writing ===
Producer and screenwriter David L. Paterson is the novel's author's son, and his name was featured on its dedication page. The story was based on his real-life best friend, Lisa Hill, who was struck by lightning and killed when they were both eight years old. Paterson had asked his mother, Katherine Paterson, if he could write a screenplay of the novel, and she agreed "not only because he's [her] son, but also because he's a very good playwright". Paterson had difficulty marketing the screenplay, mostly because of Leslie's death; "if you can believe this, I did meet with some companies that asked if I could just 'hurt' Leslie a little bit—put her in a light coma and then bring her out".

The most important thing for Paterson was to keep the spirit of the book alive while finding a way to transform it from "a novel that takes place mostly in the characters' heads to a dynamic visual medium". Paterson knew that the film had to be about friendship and imagination. While Paterson focused on "bringing out the emotions of the story," he admitted to having difficulty writing about Terabithia "because it was too close". He credited fellow screenwriter Jeff Stockwell for recreating Terabithia for the film. "What Jeff was able to do as an outsider who wasn't so attached to the story was to really let his imagination go free and make up this world in a wonderful way", David said. Csupó noted that the two main characters are a little bit older in the film than they are in the book. Csupó reasons that the movie "deals with so many issues including friendship, and maybe first innocent love, things like that", so it "made more sense" to make the characters older.

=== Casting ===
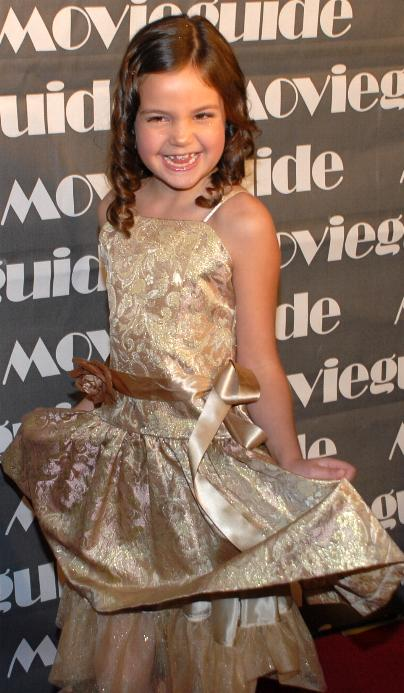
Bailee Madison was cast as May Belle Aarons.

Director Csupó stated that they had no actors initially in mind for the film. The first actor cast was AnnaSophia Robb as Leslie Burke. Robb wrote Csupó "such a beautiful, heartwarming letter" that expressed her love for the book and the character. Csupó said that he cast her because of "her letter, her enthusiasm, and her love of the material". Robb also conversed with producer Lauren Levine before casting even began, and "their conversation convinced her that, without a doubt, AnnaSophia was meant for this role". Levine said that "it was just so clear in talking to her about all this fantasy that I was basically talking to Leslie, that she had that same kind of spark and magical presence. She might be physically different from Leslie in the book, but the spirit of Leslie and the spirit of AnnaSophia are nearly identical. It was a match made in heaven." With regard to the character, Robb said "[Leslie]'s one of those people who's just always lit up, who has this glow about her, and no one can bring her down. Leslie's such a lively and energetic character, it was really fun for me to become her."

Levine stated that "looking for Jesse was a really tough hunt. We needed someone who could go from an introverted boy in an isolated world to someone who completely taps into his imagination and becomes a confident, brave leader in Terabithia. That's a heck of a range for such a young actor." Josh Hutcherson was not their first choice for the role of Jesse Aarons, but they settled with him because they "felt the chemistry between AnnaSophia Robb and him". Hutcherson said that the project appealed to him because of "the real life day-to-day drama as well as the arc of the character Jesse".

The filmmakers cast Robert Patrick as Jess's hardworking and strict father based on his previous roles in the films Walk the Line, Flags of Our Fathers, and the television series The Unit. Patrick explained that he related to the story because he was "constantly creating imaginary worlds as a kid" himself, and that the film's setting reminded him of where he grew up. He also said that he took on the role because he wanted to star in a film that his children could watch.

Csupó said that they cast Bailee Madison as May Belle Aarons after weeks of searching for an actress to play the part. He went on to say that "she had such a charm, even before the camera, she was just like a little sweetheart. She was very confident, she showed up, shook hands with everybody, totally sweet and perky. I said 'WOW!'—she was just stealing everybody's heart on the spot."

=== Filming ===
Production for the film began on February 20, 2006, with a budget of $20–25 million. Principal photography for the film was shot in Auckland, New Zealand, within 60 days. Film editing took ten weeks, while post-production, music mixing, and visual effects took a few months. The film was finished by November 2006, because the crew "had to rush" to meet the February 16 deadline.

=== Design and special effects ===
Csupó explained that "it was a very conscious decision from the very beginning that we're not going to overdo the special effects because of the story's integrity and the book's integrity", because there was only a brief mention of Jess and Leslie fighting imaginary creatures in the forest in the novel. With that in mind, they "tried to do the absolute minimum, which would be required to put it into a movie version".

In designing the fantasy creatures found in Terabithia, Csupó wanted to make creatures that were "little more artsy, imaginative, fantastical creatures than the typical rendered characters you see in other movies", and drew inspiration from Terry Gilliam and Ridley Scott. Dima Malanitchev came up with the drawings for the creatures with Csupó's guidance. Csupó chose to have Weta Digital render the 3D animation because he "was impressed with their artistic integrity, the teamwork, the [fact that] people were really nice, and also they responded to our designs very positively". Weta modified some of the creature designs, but ultimately remained faithful to Csupó's original designs.

There were around 100 crew members from Weta working on the effects for the film. Weta was already working on animating the creatures while the film was being shot, and Weta crew members were on-set for all the scenes that involved special effects during the filming. Weta visual effects supervisor Matt Aitken explained that the process involved in interpreting the creatures was "split into two steps". First, natural-looking creatures were created based on pencil sketches by Csupó and Malanitchev, and this was done mostly through Photoshop collages done by special effects art director Michael Pangrazio. The second step was to figure out animation or motion styles that best suited these creatures.

Leslie's costumes in the film were designed to look as if the character "might have made some of them herself", and they were updated from those described in the book to reflect what would currently be considered eccentric.

== Soundtrack ==
Music from and Inspired by Bridge to Terabithia is the soundtrack album to the film, released by Hollywood Records on February 13, 2007. The original score is composed by Aaron Zigman, who took over the scoring duties from Alison Krauss, after her exit from the project. Zigman, who also scored Flicka simultaneously with Bridge to Terabithia, compared both the film's having Celtic influence a bit, but added the score of the latter as more modern and orchestral compared to the former. Four of the tracks from the film's score, was only featured in the soundtrack, and Zigman's score was separately released from the album, in December 2007, only for promotional use.

== Release ==
=== Marketing and promotion ===
The promotion and advertising for the film were met with criticism and controversy. The filmmakers distanced themselves from the advertising campaign for the film, saying that it was deliberately misleading and made the film seem to be about, or occurring in, a fantasy world. David Paterson was surprised by the trailer, but understood the marketing reasoning behind it, saying:

Although there is a generation that is very familiar with the book, if you are over 40, then you probably haven't, and we need to reach them. [...] Everyone who read the book and sees the trailer says, 'What is this? This is nothing like the book. What are you doing, Dave?' And I say, 'You know what you're seeing is 15 seconds of a 90-minute film. Give me a little leeway and respect. Go see it, and then tell me what you think.

Critics commented on the film's misleading advertisement campaign. One critic said the film was actually "grounded in reality far more than in fantasy", while another thought, "far from a computer generated escapist fantasy, this film is an unpretentious and touching tale of preteen companionship and loss".

=== Distribution ===
The film premiered at the El Capitan Theatre in Hollywood on February 3, 2007. Paterson, an alumnus of the Catholic University of America, held a special advance screening of the film for members of the CUA community at the AFI Silver Theatre in Silver Spring, Maryland on February 1, 2007. The film opened in the United States on February 16, 2007, in the United Kingdom on May 4, 2007, and in New Zealand on June 7, 2007. The film had a strong second place domestic opening over the Presidents' Day weekend, grossing "a higher-than-expected" $28,536,717 from 2,284 screens, earning an average of $9,885 per screen. The opening Friday box office was $6.3 million. The film has a worldwide gross of US$137 million, taking in $82 million in the United States and Canada.

The DVD and Blu-ray Disc were released on June 19, 2007, in the United States. The DVD and high-definition Blu-ray version shared the same special features; including: "Digital Imagination: Bringing Terabithia to Life", "Behind the Book: The Themes of Bridge to Terabithia", "Keep Your Mind Wide Open" music video by Robb, and two audio commentaries, the first with director Gábor Csupó, writer Jeff Stockwell, and producer Hal Lieberman, and the second with producer Lauren Levine and actors Hutcherson and Robb.

== Reception ==
=== Critical reception ===
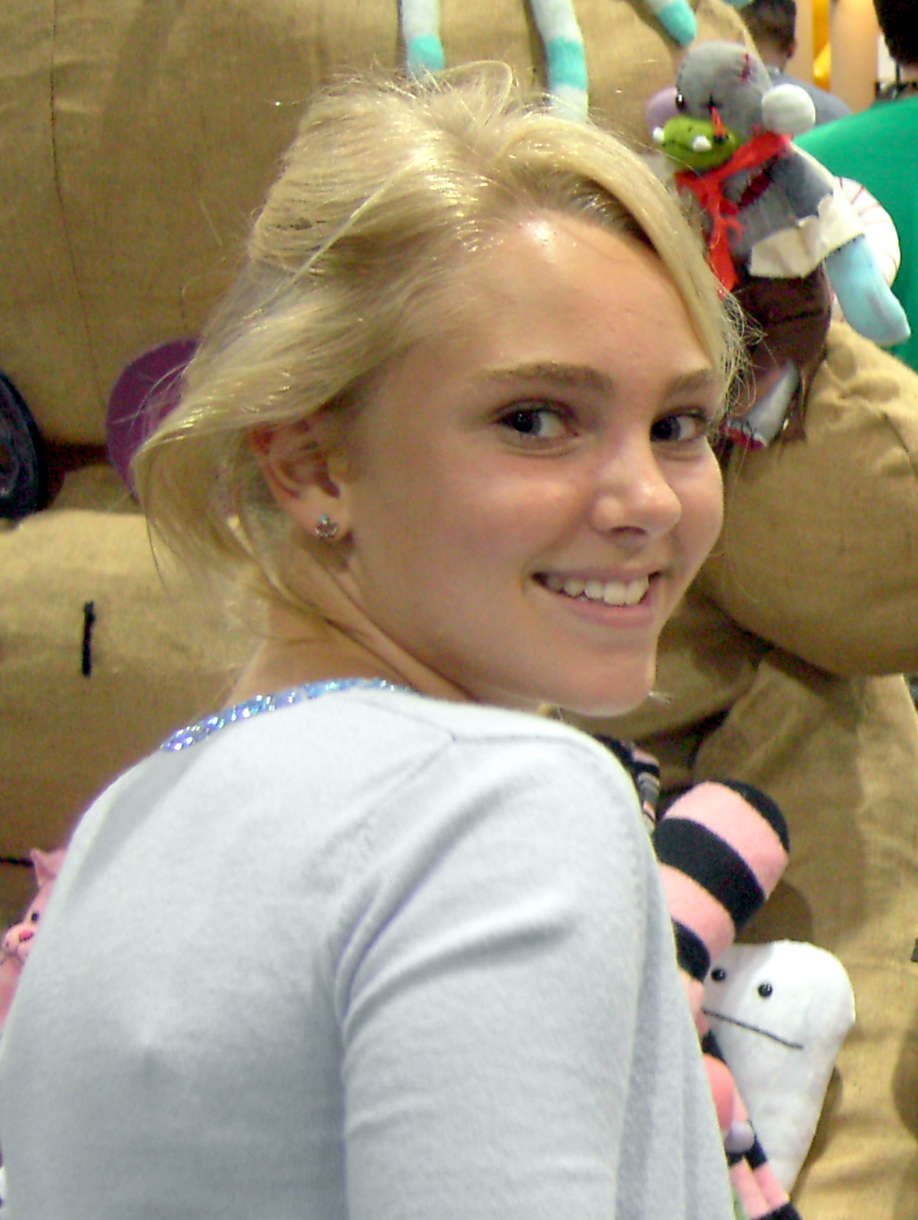
AnnaSophia Robb's portrayal of Leslie Burke was highly praised; one critic enjoyed her "engaging" performance", and thought "only the story's vibrant young heroine [...] draws us in enough to care"

Bridge to Terabithia received positive reviews from film critics. Review aggregation website Rotten Tomatoes gives the film a score of 85% based on 158 reviews, with an average score rating of 7.2/10. The site's consensus reads: "Bridge to Terabithia is a faithful adaptation of a beloved children's novel and a powerful portrayal of love, loss, and imagination through children's eyes." On Metacritic the film received a weighted average score of 74/100 based on 25 reviews, indicating "generally favorable" reviews. Audiences surveyed by CinemaScore gave the film a grade of A−.

James Berardinelli of ReelViews called Bridge to Terabithia "easily the best family feature of the early year". Ann Hornaday of The Washington Post praised the script for being "utterly recognizable and authentic", and thought Robb and Hutcherson were "perfectly cast". Hornaday wrote that although the final five minutes succumbed to "oversweet sentiment", viewers would remember the film's "warmth and respect with which it pays homage to first love". Jessica Grose of The Village Voice commended director Csupó for omitting "cutesy tween stereotypes", and felt Jess's relationship with his father elevated Bridge to Terabithia from "a good kids movie to a classic contender." The New York Times critic Jeannette Catsoulis believed that the fantasy was kept in the background "to find magic in the everyday", and thought Csupó directed "like someone intimate with the pain of being different, allowing each personality more than a single characteristic". The reviewer praised all the leads for their strong performances, especially Deschanel and Madison. Catsoulis found the film was able to handle adult topics "with nuance and sensitivity", and being consistently smart and "delicate as a spider web", it was the kind of children's movie "rarely seen nowadays". Miriam di Nunzio of the Chicago Sun-Times praised Hutcherson and Robb's performances, saying that "the film's heart and soul rests on the abilities of its young lead characters to make us really see the world through children's eyes. The dynamic duo of Hutcherson and Robb do not disappoint."

Claudia Puig of USA Today wrote that "for a movie about the power of imagination, Bridge to Terabithia is not as clever as you would hope", deeming the real-life portions "derivative and simplistic" but finding Jess's emotional tumult "powerfully authentic, and this is where the film finds its truth and soul". The Wall Street Journal critic Joe Morgenstern felt that despite the occasional misuse of enchantment, the film was told with "agreeable simplicity in between computer-generated monsters", and described the young cast's performances as "appealing but unpolished". Entertainment Weekly's Gregory Kirschling was confused by the main characters' lack of excitement towards Terabithia, and felt the film could not decide if it was "a fantasy or a coming-of-age story".

=== Accolades ===
Bridge to Terabithia was nominated for seven awards, of which it won five. Josh Hutcherson was nominated at the 2008 Saturn Awards for "Best Performance by a Younger Actor". AnnaSophia Robb was nominated for a Broadcast Film Critics Association Award for "Best Young Actress". The film won five awards at the Young Artist Awards, including "Best Family Feature Film (Fantasy or Musical)". Hutcherson won "Best Performance in a Feature Film – Leading Young Actor", Robb won "Best Performance in a Feature Film – Leading Young Actress", and Bailee Madison won "Best Performance in a Feature Film – Young Actress Age Ten or Younger". The cast won the award for "Best Performance in a Feature Film – Young Ensemble Cast", which included Hutcherson, Robb, Madison, Wakefield, Clinton, Lawless, Isabelle Rose Kircher, Carly Owen, Devon Wood, Emma Fenton and Grace Brannigan.

Year	Award	Category	Name	Result	Ref(s).
2007	Critics' Choice Movie Award	Best Young Actress	AnnaSophia Robb	Nominated	
2008	Saturn Award	Best Performance by a Younger Actor	Josh Hutcherson	Nominated	
2008	Young Artist Awards	Best Performance in a Feature Film - Leading Young Actor	Josh Hutcherson	Won	
2008	Young Artist Awards	Best Performance in a Feature Film - Young Ensemble Cast	Josh Hutcherson; AnnaSophia Robb; Bailee Madison; Cameron Wakefield; Isabelle Rose Kircher; Lauren Clinton; Elliot Lawless; Carly Owen, Devon Wood; Emma Fenton; Grace Brannigan	Won	
2008	Young Artist Awards	Best Performance in a Feature Film - Leading Young Actress	AnnaSophia Robb	Won	
2008	Young Artist Awards	Best Performance in a Feature Film - Young Actress Ten and Under	Bailee Madison	Won	
2008	Young Artist Awards	Best Family Feature Film (Fantasy or Musical)		Won	
