= Katherine Paterson =

American author (born 1932)

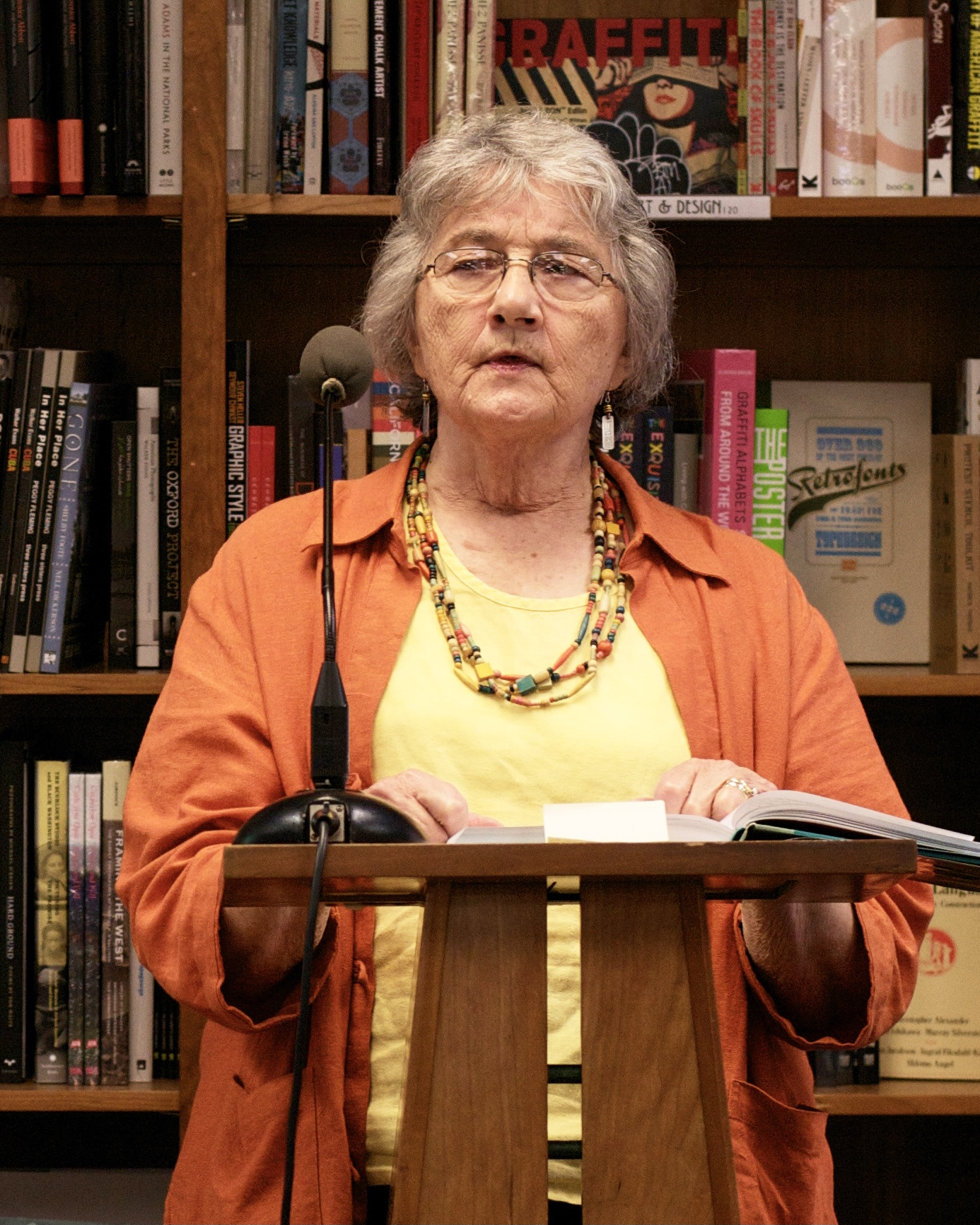
- Paterson in 2011
- Born: Katherine Womeldorf; October 31, 1932 (age 93); Huai'an, Jiangsu, Republic of China (1912-1949) (now China)
- Education: King University; Presbyterian School of Christian Education; Union Theological Seminary
- Occupation: Writer
- Spouse: John Barstow Paterson (m. 1962; died 2013)
- Children: 4, including David L. Paterson
- Writing career
- Period: 1973–present
- Genres: Children's and young-adult novels
- Notable works: The Master Puppeteer (1975); Bridge to Terabithia (1977); The Great Gilly Hopkins (1978); Jacob Have I Loved (1980); The Day of the Pelican (2009)
- Notable awards: National Book Award (1977; 1979); Newbery Medal (1977; 1981); Hans Christian Andersen Award (1998); Astrid Lindgren Award (2006); NSK Neustadt Prize for Children's Literature (2007); Children's Literature Legacy Award (2013)
- Website: www.terabithia.com

Katherine Paterson (née Womeldorf; born October 31, 1932) is an American writer best known for children's novels, including Bridge to Terabithia (1977), which won the Newbery Medal in 1978. For four different books published 1975–1980, she won two Newbery Medals and two National Book Awards. She is one of four people to win the two major international awards; for "lasting contribution to children's literature" she won the biennial Hans Christian Andersen Award for Writing in 1998 and for her career contribution to "children's and young adult literature in the broadest sense" she won the Astrid Lindgren Memorial Award from the Swedish Arts Council in 2006, the biggest monetary prize in children's literature. Also for her body of work she was awarded the NSK Neustadt Prize for Children's Literature in 2007 and the Children's Literature Legacy Award from the American Library Association in 2013. She was the second US National Ambassador for Young People's Literature, serving 2010 and 2011.

== Early life ==
Katherine Womeldorf was born in Huai'an, Republic of China (now China) to Presbyterian missionaries G. (George) Raymond and Mary Womeldorf. Her father supported her family by preaching and heading Sutton 690, a boys' school. The Womeldorf family lived in a Chinese neighborhood and immersed themselves in Chinese culture. She attended Shanghai American School where her family briefly lived in the school dormitories. When Katherine was five years old, the family fled China during the Japanese invasion of 1937. Her family returned to the United States at the onset of World War II.

Paterson said during World War II, her parents and four siblings lived in Virginia and North Carolina, and when her family's return to China was indefinitely postponed, they moved to various towns in North Carolina, Virginia, and West Virginia, before her parents settled in Winchester, Virginia. The Womeldorf family moved 15 times over 13 years.

== Higher education ==
Paterson's first language was Chinese, and she initially experienced difficulty reading and writing English. She overcame these challenges and, in 1954, graduated summa cum laude with a degree in English from King College in Bristol, Tennessee. She then spent a year teaching at a rural elementary school in Virginia before going to graduate school. She received a master's degree from the Presbyterian School of Christian Education in Richmond, Virginia, where she studied Bible and Christian education. Paterson had hoped to become a missionary in China, but its borders were closed to western citizens. A Japanese friend pushed her to go to Japan instead, where she worked as a missionary and Christian education assistant. While in Japan, Paterson studied both Japanese and Chinese culture, which influenced much of her subsequent writing.

== Writing years ==
Paterson began her professional career in the Presbyterian Church in 1964 by writing curriculum materials for fifth and sixth graders.

In 1966, she wrote the religious education book Who Am I?. While continuing to write, she was unable to get any of her novels published. After being persuaded, Paterson took an adult education course in creative writing during which her first novel was published. Her first children's novel, The Sign of the Chrysanthemum, was published in 1973. It is a work of historical fiction, set in the Japanese medieval period; it is based on Paterson's studies in Japan. Bridge to Terabithia, her most widely read work, was published in 1977. Terabithia was highly controversial due to some of the difficult themes, but is the most popular book she has written.

Some of her other books also feature difficult themes such as the death of a loved one. In her 2007 NSK Prize Lecture at the University of Oklahoma, Paterson said she has spent the last "more than forty years" of her life as a writer, and her books seem "to be filled with heroes of the most unlikely sort."

== Recent years ==
Paterson lives in Barre, Vermont. Her husband John Barstow Paterson, a retired Presbyterian pastor, died in 2013. She has four children and seven grandchildren.

On April 28, 2005, Paterson dedicated a tree in memory of Lisa Hill (her son David's childhood friend who became the inspiration for Bridge to Terabithia) to Takoma Park Elementary School. In 2006, she released Bread and Roses, Too. She was inspired to write this book after seeing a photograph of 35 children taken on the steps of the Old Socialist Labor Hall in Barre captioned, "Children of Lawrence Massachusetts, Bread and Roses Strike come to Barre".

She has written a play version of the story by Beatrix Potter, The Tale of Jemima Puddle-Duck. It was performed at a conference of the Beatrix Potter Society in Fresno, California in April 2009.

In January 2010, Paterson replaced Jon Scieszka as the Library of Congress National Ambassador for Young People's Literature, a two-year position created to raise national awareness of the importance of lifelong literacy and education.

In 2011, Paterson gave the Annual Buechner Lecture at The Buechner Institute at her alma mater, King University.

In January 2013, Paterson received the Children's Literature Legacy Award from the American Library Association, which recognizes a living author or illustrator whose books, published in the United States, have made "a substantial and lasting contribution to literature for children". Citing Bridge to Terabithia in particular, the committee noted that "Paterson's unflinching yet redemptive treatment of tragedy and loss helped pave the way for ever more realistic writing for young people."

As of 2022, Katherine Paterson is a vice-president of the National Children's Book and Literacy Alliance, a non-profit organization that advocates for literacy, literature, and libraries.

== Writing style ==
In Paterson's novels, her youthful protagonists face crises by which they learn to triumph through self-sacrifice. Paterson, unlike many other authors of young adult novels, tackles themes often considered to be adult, such as death and jealousy. Although her characters face dire situations, Paterson writes with compassion and empathy. Amidst her writing of misery and strife, Paterson interlaces her writing with wry wit and understated humor. After facing tumultuous events, her characters prevail in triumph and redeem themselves and their ambitions. Paterson's protagonists are usually orphaned or estranged children with only a few friends who must face difficult situations largely on their own. Paterson's plots may reflect her own childhood in which she felt estranged and lonely.

== Awards ==
The Hans Christian Andersen and Astrid Lindgren Awards are the two major international awards recognizing career contributions to children's literature. The Laura Ingalls Wilder Award is the highest honor from US professional librarians for contributions to American children's literature.

Paterson has also won many annual awards for new books, including the National Book Award (The Master Puppeteer, 1977; The Great Gilly Hopkins, 1979); the Edgar Allan Poe Special Award (Master Puppeteer, 1977); the Newbery Medal (Bridge to Terabithia, 1977; Jacob Have I Loved, 1981); the Scott O'Dell Award for Historical Fiction (Jip, His Story, 1996). Twenty years after its publication, Of Nightingales That Weep won the 1994 Phoenix Award as the best children's book that did not win a major contemporary award.

=== Awards for body of work ===
- E. B. White Award from the American Academy of Arts & Letters, 2019
- Laura Ingalls Wilder Medal, 2013
- NSK Neustadt Prize for Children's Literature 2007
- Astrid Lindgren Award for Lifetime Achievement 2006
- Literary Light, Boston Public Library 2000
- Living Legend, Library of Congress 2000
- Hans Christian Andersen Medal for Writing 1998
- Lion of the New York Public Library 1998
- Who's Who in American Women 1995 to present
- King College, Outstanding Alumnus 1993-1994
- Education Press Friend of Education Award 1993
- Anne V. Zarrow Award for Young Readers' Literature, Tulsa Public Library 1993
- New England Book Award 1992
- US Nominee Hans Christian Andersen Award 1989–90
- Regina Medal, Catholic Library Association 1988
- Children's Literature Award, Keene State College 1987
- Kerlan Award, University of Minnesota 1983
- The University of Southern Mississippi Medallion 1983
- Scott O'Dell Award for Children's Literature 1982
- US Nominee Hans Christian Andersen Award 1979–80
- Who's Who in America 1978 to present
- The Union Medal, Union Theological Seminary (New York)

== Adaptations ==
Bridge to Terabithia has been adapted into film twice, the 1985 PBS version and the 2007 Walden Media production version. One of the producers and screenwriters for the later version was Paterson's son David L. Paterson, whose name appears on the dedication page of the novel.

Paterson's 1980 novel, Jacob Have I Loved, was adapted into a 1989 made-for-television film by the Public Broadcasting Service as part of their children's anthology series WonderWorks.

Her short story "Poor Little Innocent Lamb" was adapted into the 2002 television film Miss Lettie and Me.

Another of her novels, The Great Gilly Hopkins, was adapted into a film, written by David L. Paterson, in 2015. Her fantasy-novel release The Flint Heart has been optioned by Bedrock Films.
