= Dutton Children's Books =

American publisher of children's books

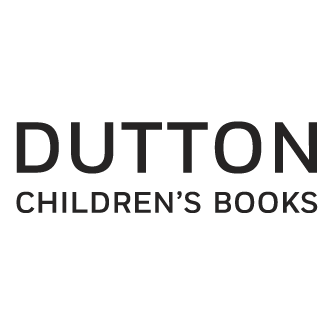
- Parent company: Penguin Group
- Status: Active
- Predecessor: E. P. Dutton
- Founded: 1852
- Founder: Edward Payson Dutton
- Country of origin: United States
- Headquarters location: 1745 Broadway/230 West 56th Street Random House Tower, Manhattan, New York City, New York, United States
- Publication types: Books
- Fiction genres: Children's
- Official website: Official website

Dutton Children's Books is a US publisher of children's books and a division of the Penguin Group. It is associated with the Dutton adult division. It was previously an imprint of E. P. Dutton, prior to 1986. They have been publishing books since 1852.

Dutton has published the Winnie-the-Pooh books by A. A. Milne in the USA since the 1920s and in Canada since the 2000s.

== Award-winning titles ==
=== Caldecott Medal ===
- 1973: The Funny Little Woman retold by Arlene Mosel, illustrated by Blair Lent
- 1998: Rapunzel, retold and illustrated by Paul O. Zelinsky

=== Caldecott Honor Books ===
- 1946: Sing Mother Goose by Opal Wheeler, illustrated by Marjorie Torrey
- 1947: Sing in Praise: A Collection of the Best Loved Hymns by Opal Wheeler, illustrated by Marjorie Torrey
- 1983: When I was Young in the Mountains by Cynthia Rylant, illustrated by Diane Goode* 1984: Hansel and Gretel retold by Rika Lesser, illustrated by Paul O. Zelinsky
- 1987: Rumpelstiltskin by Paul O. Zelinsky
- 1995: Swamp Angel by Paul O. Zelinsky

=== Golden Kite Award ===
- 2003: Leonardo, Beautiful Dreamer by Robert Byrd

=== Newbery Medal ===
- 1926: Shen of the Sea by Arthur Bowie Chrisman
- 1951: Amos Fortune, Free Man by Elizabeth Yates
- 1979: The Westing Game by Ellen Raskin

=== Newbery Honor ===
- 1927: Gayneck, The Story of a Pigeon by Dhan Gopal Mukerji
- 1929: The Boy Who Was by Grace Hallok
- 1930: Vaino by Julia Davis Adams
- 1931: Mountains are Free by Julia Davis Adams
- 1960: My Side of the Mountain by Jean Craighead George
- 1964: Rascal by Sterling North
- 1975: Figgs & Phantoms by Ellen Raskin

=== Michael L. Printz Award ===
- 2003: Postcards from No Man's Land by Aidan Chambers
- 2006: Looking for Alaska by John Green

=== New York Times Best Illustrated Books ===
- 1981: The Maid and The Mouse and The Odd-Shaped House: A Story in Rhyme by Paul O. Zelinsky
- 1992: The Fortune-Tellers by Lloyd Alexander, illustrated by Trina Schart Hyman
- 1994: Swamp Angel by Anne Isaacs, illustrated by Paul O. Zelinsky
- 2001: Sun Bread by Elisa Kleven
