= Julie Corman =

American film producer (born 1942)

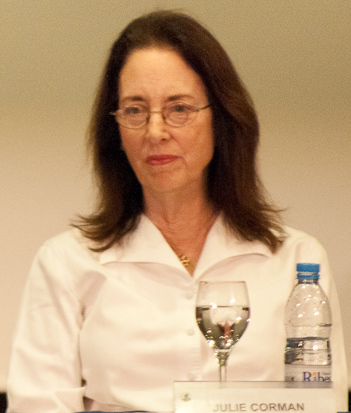
- Corman at Sitges Film Festival in 2010
- Born: Julie Ann Halloran; June 22, 1942 (age 84)
- Occupation: Film producer
- Spouse: Roger Corman (m. 1970; died 2024)
- Children: 4

Julie Ann Corman (née Halloran; born June 22, 1942) is an American film producer. She is the widow of film producer and director Roger Corman.

== Life and career ==
Corman was born Julie Ann Halloran in 1942. In 1970, she married film director and producer, Roger Corman, with whom she would go on to have four children.

Corman produced a series of "Night Nurses" films, including Night Call Nurses and Candy Stripe Nurses. She went on to produce Moving Violation, starring Kay Lenz and Eddie Albert; Crazy Mama, directed by Jonathan Demme, starring Cloris Leachman, The Lady in Red, written by John Sayles, starring Robert Conrad and Pamela Sue Martin; Saturday the 14th, starring Richard Benjamin, Paula Prentiss and Jeffrey Tambor; and Da, starring Barnard Hughes, based on the Tony Award-winning play.

In 1984, Corman started her own company, Trinity Pictures, with which she has produced a number of family films, two of which are based on Newbery Award-winning novels: A Cry in the Wild is based on Gary Paulsen’s novel, Hatchet, and Get a Clue is based on Ellen Raskin’s novel, The Westing Game.

Corman has produced several other family films: The Dirt Bike Kid, starring Peter Billingsley; Max is Missing, shot at Machu Picchu in Peru; and Legend of the Lost Tomb, based on Walter Dean Myers’s book Tales of a Dead King and shot in Egypt. She made a series of wilderness films: White Wolves: A Cry in the Wild II, starring Mark-Paul Gosselaar and White Wolves II: Legend of the Wild, starring Elizabeth Berkley, Corin Nemec, Justin Whalin and Jeremy London. The Academy of Family Film and Television named her “Producer of the Year” for her achievements in 1996.

From 2000 to 2002, Corman served as Chair of the Graduate Film Department at New York University in the Maurice Kanbar Institute of Film and Television. While there, Corman executive produced a series of short films by NYU film students, Reflections from Ground Zero, based on the students’ 9/11 experiences. The films aired on Showtime.

Corman is a member of Women in Film and the International Women's Forum. She has given various film seminars at NYU, Duke University and Sundance. She has received a career achievement award from Fantastic Fest in Austin, Texas and was given the Indy Pioneer Award at the Kansas City Filmmakers Jubilee.

== Appraisal ==
According to Filmink magazine, Julie Corman had an underappreciated influence on her husband's output:

She produced some of New World’s strongest femme driven films (Summer School Teachers, Lady in Red), the best movies made by Jim Wynorski (Chopping Mall) and Barbara Peeters (Summer School Teachers), and early films from Martin Scorsese (Boxcar Bertha) and Jonathan Kaplan (Night Call Nurses, The Student Teachers); she tried to get Shirley Clarke on to direct Crazy Mama...she encouraged Roger to diversify his slate into kids’ films (The Dirt Bike Kid, A Cry in the Wild), broad comedies (Saturday the 14th...) and Irish drama (Da); it was she, rather than Roger, who took artistic swings during the New Horizon years (Nightfall, Brain Dead).

== Filmography ==
Producer

- Boxcar Bertha (1971)
- Night Call Nurses (1972)
- The Student Teachers (1973)
- The Young Nurses (1973)
- Summer School Teachers (1974)
- Candy Stripe Nurses (1974)
- Crazy Mama (1975)
- Moving Violation (1976)
- The Lady in Red (1979)
- Saturday the 14th (1981)
- The Dirt Bike Kid (1985)
- Chopping Mall (1986)
- Nowhere to Hide (1987)
- Saturday the 14th Strikes Back (1988)
- Nightfall (1988)
- Da (1988)
- Drop-Out Mother (TV movie) (1988)
- The Nest (1988)
- Nowhere to Run (1989)
- A Cry in the Wild (1990)
- Brain Dead (1990)
- Sorority House Massacre II (1990)
- White Wolves: A Cry in the Wild II (1993)
- The Silence of the Hams (1994)
- Max Is Missing (TV movie) (1995)
- White Wolves II: Legend of the Wild (1995)
- Get a Clue (The Westing Game) (TV movie) (1997)
- Legend of the Lost Tomb (TV movie) (1997)

Co-producer

- Cyclops (TV movie) (2008)
- Splatter (TV series short) (2009)
- Sharktopus (TV movie) (2010)
- Dinoshark (TV movie) (2010)
