= Jessie Gillespie Willing =

Book and magazine illustrator (1888–1972)

Jessie Gillespie Willing (March 28, 1888 – August 1, 1972) was an American illustrator during the Golden Age of illustration. She was considered the foremost silhouette illustrator of her time, although she did traditional illustration as well. Willing illustrated for books and magazines including Life, The Ladies' Home Journal, Woman's Home Companion, Mother and Child, McClure's Magazine, Childhood Education, the Sunday Magazine, Association Men (the magazine of the YMCA), Farm and Fireside, Every Week, Children: The Magazine for Parents (which became Parents Magazine), and the American Magazine. She is perhaps most well known for her work for the Girl Scouts.

== Early life ==
Willing was born in Brooklyn on March 28, 1888, to John Thomson Willing (August 4, 1860 – July 8, 1947) and Charlotte Elizabeth Van Der Veer Willing (December 1, 1859 – March 4, 1930). Thomson Willing was a noted illustrator and art editor. He was also well known for finding new artistic talent. Jessie Willing was the eldest of three children. Her brother Van Der Veer (November 30, 1889 – January 14, 1919), who died of pneumonia at the age of 29, was an advertising agent. Her sister Elizabeth Hunnewell Willing (July 26, 1908 – August 15, 1991) was one of the first women to graduate from the Philadelphia Divinity School. Elizabeth married the Rev. Orrin Judd, rector of St. Mary's Episcopal Church, on September 22, 1931, and was active in church work.

The Willing family moved to the Germantown neighborhood of Philadelphia in 1901 or 1902. Jessie Willing attended the Stevens School, from which she graduated in 1905. She then went on to attend the Philadelphia Academy of Fine Arts from 1906 to 1907.

== Career ==
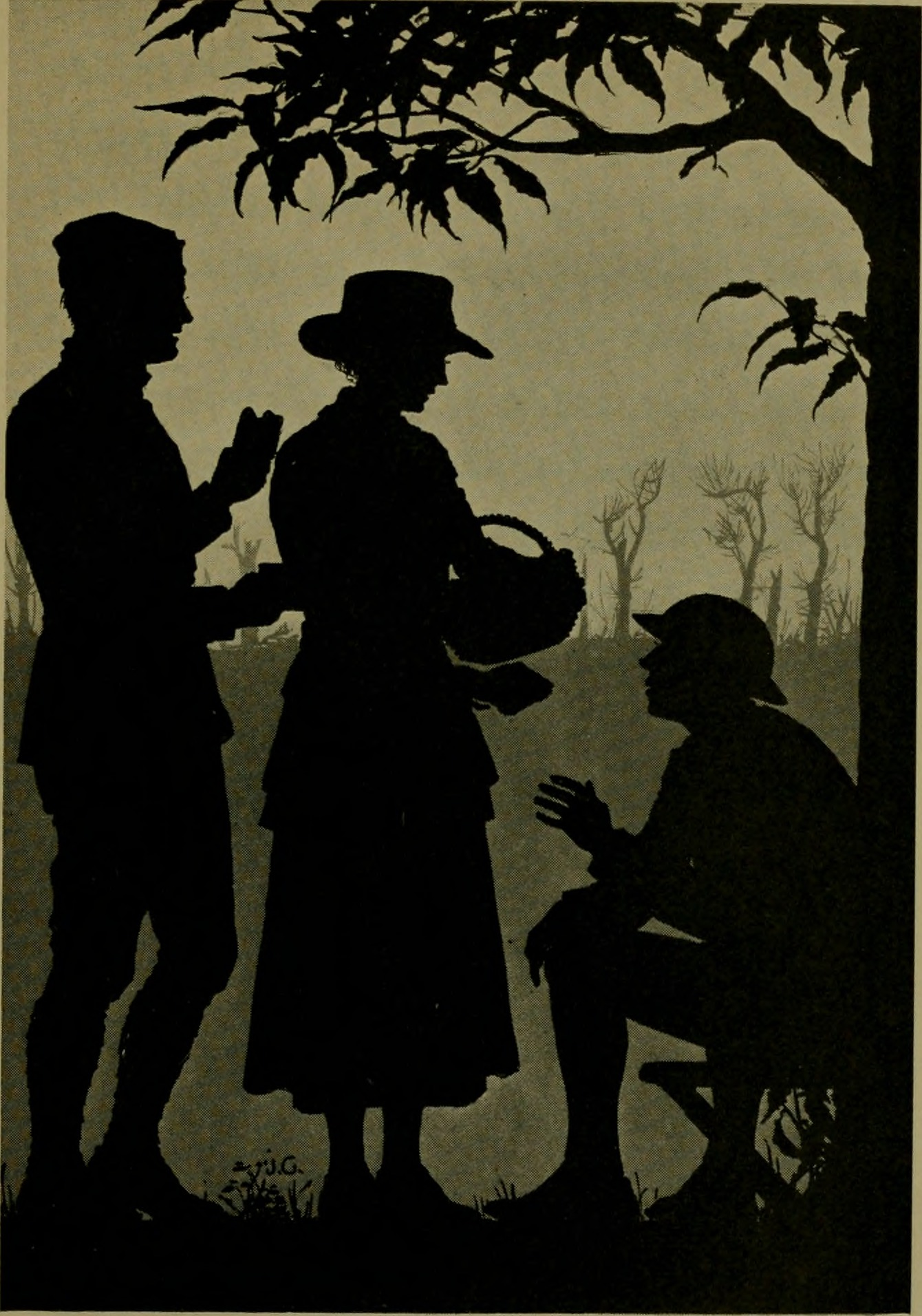
Illustration for Soldier Silhouettes on Our Front (1918)

Willing used her middle name Gillespie as her professional surname. She also often signed her illustrations J.G. The story goes that the art editor of Life magazine was in Thomson Willing's office when he was the art editor of the Associated Sunday Magazine syndicate. Thomson Willing had some of Jessie's artwork on his desk, which the Life editor saw and admired. He asked for the artist's information so that he could give her freelance work. Thomson Willing did not want to be accused of nepotism so he persuaded Jessie to use Jessie Gillespie as her professional name, which she did.

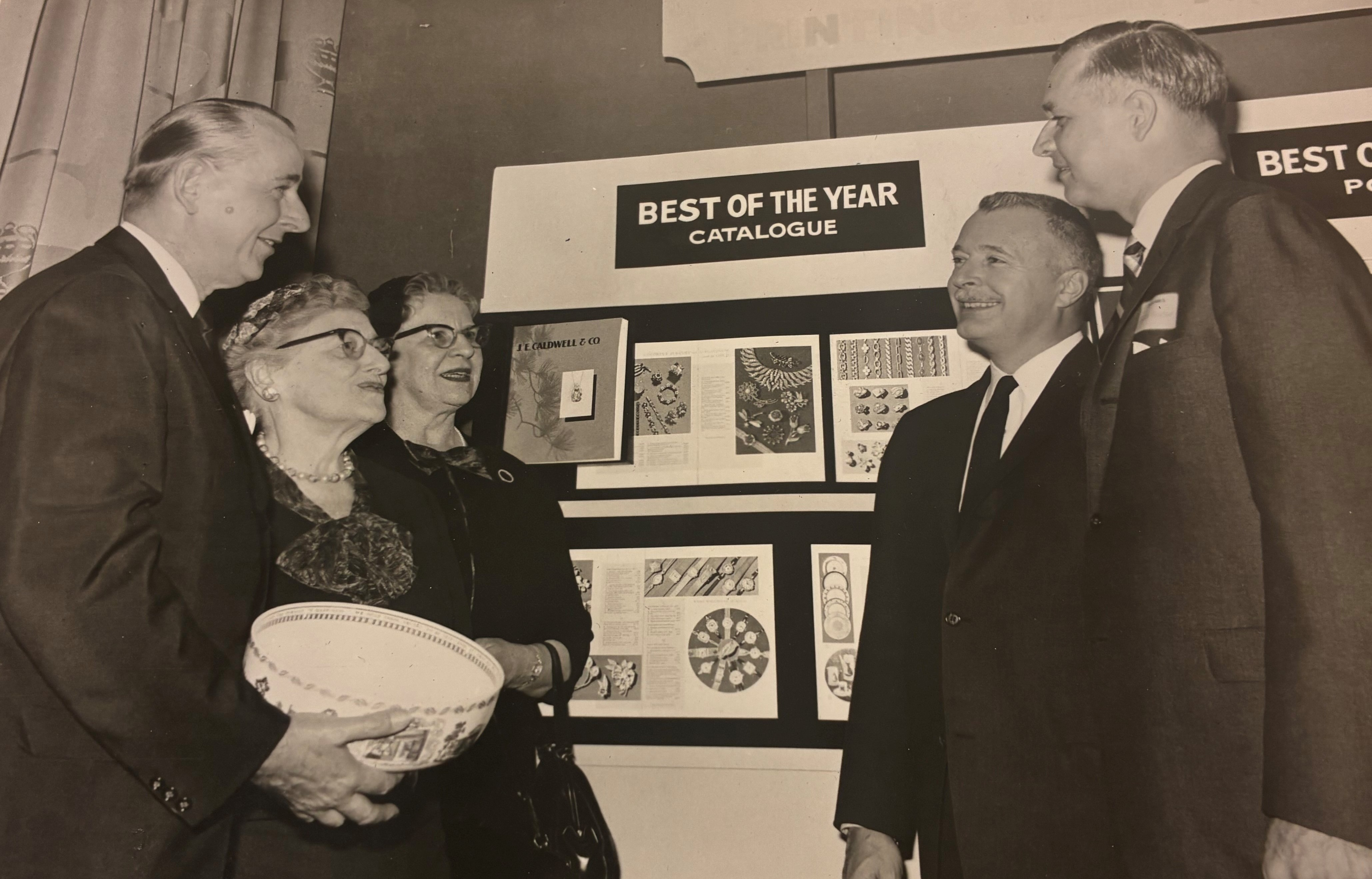
Jessie Gillespie Willing (middle left) is recognized for her work on the 1966 J.E. Caldwell Christmas Catalog. Image courtesy of the Charles Deering McCormick Library, Northwestern University

In addition to her extensive illustration work, Willing was also the editor of Heirlooms and Masterpieces from 1922 to 1931 and the art editor of Jewelers' Circular-Keystone from 1933 to 1939. She specialized in jewelry publicity and advertising. In 1966 she won the Gold medal of the Printing Week Graphic Arts Exhibit in Philadelphia for her Christmas catalog for J.E. Caldwell Co., Philadelphia.

Willing was a member of the Plastic Club of Philadelphia, the American Institute of Graphic Arts (AIGA) and the National Arts Club of New York. She was an honorary life member of the National Arts Club and served on its Board of Governors from 1941 to 1970. In 1963, she received the Gold Medal of the National Arts Club in recognition of 32 years of selfless devotion. Additionally, she was the national director of the American Institute of Graphic Arts (AIGA) from 1943 to 1946. Previous to this she served as the Program Chairman of the AIGA and in that position she put together a travelling exhibit on the "history of narrative art from the first recorded picture story to the comic book of the twentieth century."

== Illustrations in books ==
- With Tongue and Pen – Frederick Bair, et al. (MacMillan, 1940)
- Masoud the Bedouin – Alfred Post Carhart (Missionary Education Movement, 1915)
- The Path of the Gopatis – Zilpha Carruthers (National Dairy Council, 1926)
- The Schoolmaster and His Son: A Narrative of the Thirty Years War – Karl Heinrich Caspari (Lutheran Publication Society, 1917)
- On a Rainy Day – Dorothy Canfield Fisher and Sarah Scott Fisher (A.S. Barnes and Co., 1938)
- Book of Games for Home, School and Playground – William B. Forbush and Harry R Allen (John C. Winston, 1927)
- Making Life Count – Eugene C. Foster (Interchurch Press, 1918)
- Precious Books: Why and Where They are Treasured – Jessie Gillespie (A.T. Walraven Book Cover Co., 1933)
- The Story of Little Goody Two-Shoes – (Grosset & Dunlap, 1944)
- The Wisdom of Professor Happy, by the Professor Himself – Cliff Goldsmith (Child Health Organization of America, 1922)
- Cho-Cho and the Health Fairy – Eleanor Glendower Griffith (MacMillan Co., 1922)
- Travels of a Rolled Oat – Grace T. Hallock (Quaker Oats Co, 1929)
- Grain Through the Ages – Grace T. Hallock (Quaker Oats Co., 1931)
- A Flower of Monterey: A Romance of the Californias – Katherine B. Hamill (The Page Company, 1921)
- Miss Gay's Adventures in First Aid, Series No. II: Artificial Respiration and the Need for Inhalators – Margaret Daly Hopkins (Hopkins Chart Co. 1936)
- Ann of Ava – Ethel Daniels Hubbard (Missionary Education Movement, 1913)
- The Moffats – Ethel Daniels Hubbard (Missionary Education Movement, 1917)
- Spending the Day in China, Japan and the Philippines – Sally Lucas Jean and Grace T. Hallock (Harper and Brothers, 1932)
- A Lovely Gate Set Wide: A Book of Catholic Verse for Young Readers – Sister Patrice Margaret (The Bruce Publishing Co., 1946)
- The Pageant of Protestantism: Celebrating the Quadricentennial of the Reformation – Harriet Earhart Monroe (The Lutheran Publication Society, 1917)
- Is this Tomorrow? – A. E. Osmond (Ernest Benn, 1949)
- All Around the clock: Tales of Service and Sport – George Frederick Park (The Lutheran Publication Society, 1917)
- Grif of Greenbrier Farm – George Frederick Park (The Lutheran Publication Society, 1917)
- Everychild's Book Illustrated – Antoinette Rotan Peterson (MacMillan Company, 1922)
- Rhymes of Cho Cho's Grandma – Mrs. Frederick Peterson (Children's Health Organization of America, 1920)
- Living with the Family – Hazel Huston Price (Little, Brown and Co., 1942)
- The Knight in Grey: A Historical Novel – Marie E. Richard (The Lutheran Publication Society, 1913)
- The Honey Pot, Or, In the Garden of Lelita – Norval Richardson (L.C. Page & Co., 1912)
- The Three Kings, translated from the German by Gustav Nieritz – Rebecca H. Schively (The Lutheran Publication Society)
- The Singing Weaver and Other Stories – Julius and Margaret Seebach (The Lutheran Publication Society, 1917)
- Other Peoples' Children – Margaret R. Seebach (The Lutheran Publication Society, 1914)
- Soldier Silhouettes on our Front – William Le Roy Stidger (Scribner, 1918)
- Star Dust from the Dugouts: A Reconstruction Book – William Le Roy Stidger (The Abingdon Press, 1919)
- Health – C.E. Turner and Georgie B. Collins (D.C. Heath and Company, 1924)
- The What-Shall-I-Do-Girl: Or, the Career of Joy Kent – Isabel Waitt (L.C. Page & Co., 1913)
- The Birds' Christmas Carol – Mrs. Kate D. Wiggin (Houghton Mifflin Company, 1941)
- The Pleasuring of Susan Smith – Helen Maria Winslow (Sir Isaac Pitman & Sons, 1912)

== Illustrations in Life magazine ==
Illustrations appearing in Life magazine:

- Adele – , A-Dell, “Adele!, July 9, 1914
- All, All are Gone, The Old Familiar Faces, April 7, 1910
- And I Sent Her Only a Christmas Card!, December 1, 1910
- At Any Matinee, April 15. 1909
- At the Afternoon Tea: ’The Ill-bred Line, August 1, 1912
- Baseball Term: “Perfect Control But No Speed, October 26, 1911
- Blessed Be the Tie That Binds, November 10, 1910
- Bride: Quick, John! There's Another Grain!, March 17, 1910
- Bubble, Bubble, Toil and Trouble, June 15, 1911
- The Date Palm and the Rubber Plant, July 31, 1919
- Desperation, Inspiration, Anticipation, Realization, March 1, 1915
- The Difference Between Counter Irritants and Counter Attractions, September 8, 1910
- A Directoire Wash Day, March 11, 1909
- Dutch Treat, May 28, 1914
- Grandmothers, March 11, 1909
- Hark the Herald Angels Sing, December 7, 1911
- In the Hands of the Receiver, December 7, 1916
- January First: God Rest You, Merry Gentlemen. Let Nothing You Dismay, December 29, 1910
- A Jug of Wine and Thou, March 31, 1910
- The Land(ing) of the Free, December 15, 1910
- Metamorphosis, April 29, 1909
- Miss’ill Toe The Mark, December 7, 1911
- The Modern Pied Piper, March 24, 1910
- More Speed, Less Haste, January 6, 1910
- Needs Must When Fashion Drives, March 2, 1911
- Oh, the Difference Between Kissing a Miss, and Missing a Kiss!, December 25, 1913
- Oh, Woman in Your Hours of Ease, October 13, 1910
- Palms, March 31, 1910
- Peace on Earth, Good Will Toward Men, December 2, 1909
- The Right Kind of ‘Protection, September 7, 1911
- Sister! As Others See Us, April 7, 1910
- So Thoughtful of You – Just What I Wanted, December 2, 1909
- Some are Born Rich, Some Achieve Riches, and Some Have Riches Thrust Upon Them
- Styles for 1909: But Where Do We Come In?, December 3, 1908
- Syncopation, Desperation, Renunciation, Abnegation, Consummation But ----ation, August 31, 1916
- The Theatre Train, March 9, 1911
- ’There was no room for them in the inn’. – St. Luke 2:7, December 2, 1915
- They Toil Not, Neither Do They Spin, March 3, 1910
- To Them That Hath, April 27, 1911
- Town and Country, May 6, 1909
- Trying Psycho-Physico Suggestion, September 22, 1910
- Valentines, February 2, 1911
- What Next? January 28. 1909
- The Woman Tempted Me and I Did Eat, March 23, 1911
- A Women's Work is Never Done, November 26, 1908

== Illustrations in other magazines ==
- "The Kindergarten and the Nursery School Movement" – Julia Wade Abbot (Mother and Child, February 1923)
- "Health Habits in the Kindergarten" – Julia Wade Abbot (Mother and Child, December 1921)
- "The Blue Store: A Bit of Business Magic" – Richard Bracefield (McClure's, July 1913)
- "Lucy and the Fairies" – Margaret Brearley (Childhood Education, September 1927)
- "Chicago, the Healthiest City" – Herman N. Bundesen (Chicago's Health, June 29. 1926)
- "Prevent Preventable Diseases" – Herman N. Bundesen (Chicago's Health, October 12, 1926).
- "Afternoon Tea at Washington" – Adele Steiner Burleson (Sunday Magazine, December 2, 1913)
- "The Gym or the 'Jimmies'" – Ellis Parker Butler (Association Men, September 1927)
- "The Thing You Want May Be Right at Your Elbow" – J.S. Cates (Farm and Fireside, November 1919)
- "Well, What's New in Your Line?" – James H. Collins (Every Week, March 2, 1918)
- "Does Your Farming Ever Take You Back to School?" – James H. Collins (Farm and Fireside, March 1919)
- "The Child at the Christmas Play" – Jessie Collin (Ladies' Home Journal, December 1914)
- "Prohibition – And Your Farm" – William Harpter Dean (Fire and Fireside, July 1919)
- "The Comedy of Clothes" – Jessie Gillespie (Sunday Magazine, January 3, 1915)
- Cover Art – Jessie Gillespie (The Smart Set, March 1913)
- Cover Art – Jessie Gillespie (Sunday Magazine, February 4, 1912)
- Cover Art – Jessie Gillespie (Sunday Magazine, April 7, 1912)
- Cover Art – Jessie Gillespie (Association Men, December 1922)
- "Frontispiece" – Jessie Gillespie (Mother and Child, February 1923)
- "Panta=loons" – Jessie Gillespie (Sunday Magazine, October 25, 1914)
- "The Comic in Dress" – Grace Margaret Gould (Woman's Home Companion, March 1915)
- "The Deceitful Mirror" – Grace Margaret Gould (Woman's Home Companion, September 1913)
- "Good Lucks: After Vacation Comes Renovating Time for Faces" – Grace Margaret Gould (Woman's Home Companion, October 1919)
- "How Do You Wear Your Hat?" – Grace Margaret Gould (Woman's Home Companion, April 1919)
- "How to be happy Through Traveling" – Grace Margaret Gould (Woman's Home Companion, June 1918)
- "As Bad as She's Painted? I Should Say Not!" – Corra Harris (Pictorial Review, January 1922)
- "The Rain-Maker and the Missionary" – Harold B. Hunting (Everland, December 1917)
- "Is Your Child's Health Threatened by Your Indifference?" – Sally Lucas Jean (Children: The Magazine for Parents, December 1926)
- "What are Good Manners? Can You Afford to Have Less Than the Best?" – Henry Churchill King (The Delineator, June 1916)
- "Adventures in Money Raising" – Frank B. Lenz (Association Men, April 1928)
- "A Plain Farmer Answers Hughes and Sapiro on Cooperation" – Daniel Lewis (Farm and Fireside, March 1921)
- "What I See on Fifth Avenue" – Alice Long (Ladies Home Journal, September – November 1913)
- "What I See on Fifth Avenue: That I Can Make Myself" – Alice Long (Ladies' Home Journal, January – May 1914)
- "Dressing the Heroine" – Kate Masterson (Sunday Magazine, December 7, 1913)
- "WATER Outdoors and In" – Faith Morrison (Children: The Magazine for Parents, September 1927)
- "Mothers-in Law: Will Find Suggestions Her for Making Good" – A Mother of Five Children (Woman's Home Companion, June 1923)
- "When Ideals are in the Making" – Henry Neumann (Children: The Magazine for Parents, July 1927)
- "I Don't Want to go Back! Says the Wife" – Montanye Perry (Pictorial Review, 1919)
- "My Marriage" – Readers of Every Week (Every Week, December 24, 1917)
- "The 4-Flavored Cone" – Theodore Roberts (Story Parade, August 1948)
- "What's in a Name?" – George R. Stewart (Children: The Magazine for Parents, December 1927)
- "A Woman and Her Raiment" – Ida M. Tarbell (The American Magazine, August 1912)
- "Her Search for a Flat: An Urban Monologue" – Helen Green Van Campen (Ladies' Home Journal, October 1913)
- "What, Then, is Then That is Worth Doing in this World?" – Joseph Wing (Farm and Fireside, March 1921)
- "Going After Things" – Edward Mott Woolley (Everybody's Magazine, June 1915)

== Vogue magazine covers ==
Willing's art appeared on several Vogue magazine covers from 1910 to 1912. They are generally signed J.G.

- July 15, 1910
- September 1, 1910
- November 1, 1910
- March 15, 1911
- April 15, 1911
- May 15, 1911
- December 1, 1911
- February 1, 1912

== The Girl Scouts ==
Willing was among the noted artists, including Lester Ralph, Margaret Evans Price, and Edith Ballinger Price, to create memorable illustrations for the Girl Scouts. Willing's silhouettes were used in handbooks, song books, certificates, postcards, Christmas cards, stationery, equipment catalogs, and the Girl Scout magazines, The Rally (1917–1920), The American Girl (1920–1979), and The Girl Scout Leader (1923–2009).

== Work for nonprofits ==
In addition to the work that she did for the Girl Scouts, Willing did publicity work for the Children's Aid Society, the Boys' Club of New York, the Peabody Home for Aged and Indigent Women, the Chapin Home for the Aging and the National Council of Protestant Episcopal Churches.

Willing served as president of the Manhattan United Church Women from 1957 to 1960; the vice president and a director of the Manhattan Protestant Council; a member of the Board of the Church Women, Diocese of New York; and president of the Women's Association of Grace Church, NY.

== The Parents Magazine Medal and the Boys' Club of NY Harkness Medal ==
In 1927, Children, The Magazine for Parents created an award for the best book for parents, written by an American author and published during the year. Willing created the medal, which depicts the head of a young boy facing left with the inscription, "Puer melior, civis optimus," which translated means "The better the child, the better the citizen." Children, The Magazine for Parents changed its name to Parents' in 1929. The medal was crafted by the Medallic Art Company (MACO) and was assigned the MACO number 1928-012.

Willing also created the image for the William Hale Harkness medal for the highest potential in leadership and citizenship for the Boys' Club of NY. The medal depicts three young men facing right. This medal was also crafted by the Medallic Art Company and was assigned the MACO number 1956-076.

== Later life and death ==
Willing moved to West Caldwell, NJ, where her sister lived, in 1971. She died in Mountainside Hospital in Montclair, NJ on August 1, 1972, and was interred in the family plot at Greenwood Cemetery in Brooklyn.
