= Paul O. Zelinsky =

American children's illustrator and writer (born 1953)

Paul Oser Zelinsky (born 1953) is an American illustrator and writer who illustrated children's picture books. He won the 1998 Caldecott Medal for U.S. picture book illustration for Rapunzel. His most popular work is The Wheels On the Bus, a best-selling movable book.

Zelinsky had been runner-up for the Caldecott Medal in 1985, 1987, and 1995, the latter for Swamp Angel by Anne Isaacs (Dutton, 1994). Twenty years later, they were joint runners-up for the Phoenix Picture Book Award from the Children's Literature Association, which annually recognizes the best picture book that did not win a significant award 20 years earlier. "Books are considered not only for the quality of their illustrations but for the way pictures and text work together."

== Biography ==
=== Early life ===
Paul O. Zelinsky was born in Evanston, Illinois, and grew up in Wilmette. As a child, he spent much of his time drawing. He would make up imaginary worlds with his friends and draw them. When he was only four, he submitted work to Highlights magazine, and this is when his artwork was first showcased. Influential early childhood books included The Color Kittens and Tawny Scrawny Lion. Regarding his memories of childhood reading, Zelinsky said, "Feelings come to me as a sort of flavor. I know that when I call up my earliest memories, what I remember seeing and hearing is accompanied by a flavor-like sense of what it felt like to be there and see that." (This phenomenon is known as synesthesia.) Later in his childhood, his favorite authors were William Pène du Bois and Robert Lawson. He especially loved the books The Twenty-One Balloons by Du Bois, and The Fabulous Flight by Lawson.

=== Career ===
At New Trier High School, Zelinsky was interested in natural history and architecture and saw himself following one of those paths for a career. However, he went to study at Yale. He took a class taught by Maurice Sendak on the history and art of children's books, and it inspired him to a career in the area. Zelinsky attended the Tyler School of Art graduate school in Philadelphia and Rome. Renaissance and Italian art have always fascinated him, and this time in his life also influenced this love. His career in children's books began in 1978 with the illustrations for Avi's Emily Upham's Revenge. Since then, he has continued illustrating others' work and creating his own books. He won the 1998 Caldecott Medal for his illustrated retelling of Rapunzel and three Caldecott Honors (for Hansel and Gretel (1985), Rumpelstiltskin (1987), and Swamp Angel (1995)). His most popular book, Wheels On the Bus, has sold millions.

== Artistic style ==
Zelinsky does not have a recognizable style, suiting his artwork and techniques to the particular nature of the book to be illustrated. According to Linnea Lannon in the artist profile Detroit Free Press, "What has raised Zelinsky into the first rank of children's book illustrators is not just the pictures but the way they integrate with text." Zelinsky says, "I want the pictures to speak in the same voice as the words. This desire has led me to try various kinds of drawings in different books. I have used quite a wide stretch of styles, and I'm fortunate to have been asked to illustrate such a range of stories." Wheels On the Bus and Knick-Knack Paddywhack! are engineered books with moving parts. Zelinsky is not a paper engineer himself; Rodger Smith engineered Wheels On the Bus and Andrew Baron Knick-Knack Paddywhack!

== Books ==
As a writer and illustrator

- The Maid and the Mouse and the Odd-Shaped House: A Story in Rhyme (1981) – adapted from a school exercise
- The Lion and the Stoat (Greenwillow Books, 1984) – based in part on natural history by Pliny the Elder LCCN 83-16326
- Rumpelstiltskin, retold (1986) – Brothers Grimm
- Wheels On the Bus, paper engineer Rodger Smith (Dutton, 1990) – adapted from the children's folk song OCLC 22582572; "A Book with Parts that Move" — Cover OCLC 850027738
- Rapunzel, retold (1997) – from the Brothers Grimm (1812)
- Knick-Knack Paddywhack!, paper engineer Andrew Baron (Dutton, 2002) – adapted from the nursery rhyme "This Old Man"; "A Moving Parts Book Adapted from the Counting Song" — Cover OCLC 865205168

As illustrator

- Emily Upham's Revenge, or How Deadwood Dick Saved the Banker's Niece: A Massachusetts Adventure, written by Avi (Pantheon Books, 1978)
- How I Hunted the Little Fellows, Boris Zhitkov, transl. from Russian by Djemma Bider (Dodd, Mead, 1979)
- The History of Helpless Harry, to Which is Added a Variety of Amusing and Entertaining Adventures, Avi (1980)
- What Amanda Saw, Naomi Lazard (1981)
- Three Romances: Love Stories from Camelot Retold, Winifred Rosen (1981)
- Ralph S. Mouse, Beverly Cleary (1982)
- The Sun's Asleep Behind the Hill, Mirra Ginsburg (1982) – adapted from an Armenian song
- The Song in the Walnut Grove, David Kherdian (1982)
- Dear Mr. Henshaw, Beverly Cleary (1983)
- Zoo Doings: Animal Poems, Jack Prelutsky (1983)
- Hansel and Gretel, retold by Rika Lesser (1984)
- The Story of Mrs. Lovewright and Her Purrless Cat, Lore Segal (1985)
- The Random House Book of Humor for Children, selected by Pamela Pollack (1988)
- The Big Book for Peace, Myra Cohn Livingston (1990)
- Strider, Beverly Cleary (1991)
- The Enchanted Castle, E. Nesbit (1992; orig. 1907)
- More Rootabagas, posthumous collection by Carl Sandburg, ed. George Hendrick (1993)
- Swamp Angel, Anne Isaacs (Dutton Children's Books, 1994)
- Five Children and It, E. Nesbit (1999; orig. 1902)
- Awful Ogre's Awful Day, Jack Prelutsky (2000) – poems
- Doodler Doodling, Rita Golden Gelman (2004)
- Toys Go Out series, children's novels by Emily Jenkins, published by Schwartz & Wade
  - Toys Go Out: Being the Adventures of a Knowledgeable Stingray, a Toughy Little Buffalo, and Someone called Plastic (2006)
  - Toy Dance Party: Being the Further Adventures of a Bossyboots Stingray, a Courageous Buffalo, and a Hopeful Round Someone called Plastic (2008)
  - Toys Come Home: Being the Early Experiences of an Intelligent Stingray, a Brave Buffalo, and a Brand-New Someone called Plastic (2011)
  - Toys Meet Snow: Being the Wintertime Adventures of a Curious Stuffed Buffalo, a Sensitive Plush Stingray, and a Book-Loving Rubber Ball (forthcoming 2015)
- The Shivers in the Fridge, Fran Manushkin (2006)
- Awful Ogre Running Wild, Jack Prelutsky (2008) – poems
- Dust Devil, Anne Isaacs (Random House/Schwartz & Wade, 2010) – sequel to Swamp Angel
- Z is for Moose, Kelly Bingham (2012)
- Earwig and the Witch, Diana Wynne Jones (2012)
- Circle, Square, Moose, Kelly Bingham (2014) – sequel to Z is for Moose
