= The Mysterious Disappearance of Leon (I Mean Noel) =

1971 novel by Ellen Raskin

- First edition
- Author: Ellen Raskin
- Language: English
- Genre: Children's mystery
- Publisher: Dutton Juvenile
- Publication date: 1971
- Publication place: USA
- ISBN: 0-14-032945-5
- OCLC: 59819816

The Mysterious Disappearance of Leon (I Mean Noel) is a children's mystery novel by Ellen Raskin, published in 1971.

== Plot summary ==
Mrs. Caroline Fish Carillon searches for her missing husband, Leon. They were married as children to solidify a business arrangement between their parents who had started a soup company. After several years apart, they plan to meet again as adults. During a sailing trip, Leon (who has changed his name to Noel), falls overboard. He shouts a message to his wife which is partially obscured by his going underwater: "Noel (glub) see (blub) all... I (glub) new..." When she recovers in the hospital and learns that her husband has checked out with no further news, Mrs. Carillon is convinced the answer to his whereabouts are contained in the mysterious message. She spends years trying to interpret the "glub-blubs", eventually enlisting her adopted twin children, Tony and Tina, and childhood friend, Augie Kunkel. When they finally figure out the truth, they are quite surprised.

== Literary significance and reception ==
The book received good reviews. The Horn Book Magazine described it as a "story crammed with baffling word puzzles, a dozen zany characters, uproariously funny situations, and unmitigated slapstick." It has fun with language, and helps young readers with clues in liberally dispersed footnotes.
