= The Tattooed Potato and Other Clues =

1975 novel by Ellen Raskin

- First edition
- Author: Ellen Raskin
- Language: English
- Genre: Children's mystery novel
- Publisher: E. P. Dutton
- Publication date: 1975
- Publication place: United States
- ISBN: 0-525-40805-3
- OCLC: 1093662
- LC Class: PZ7.R1817 Tat

The Tattooed Potato and Other Clues is a children's novel by Ellen Raskin, published in 1975.

== Plot summary ==
Seventeen-year-old Dickory Dock, an art-school student in Greenwich Village, answers an ad for a job as a painter's assistant at Number 12 Cobble Lane. The painter, Garson, evaluates and hires her; in her duties of cleaning paintbrushes and answering the door, she becomes involved in Garson's mysterious affairs, as well of those of his downstairs neighbors, Manny Mallomar and Shrimps Marinara. She befriends Garson's companion, a deaf, mentally handicapped man with the pseudonym of Isaac Bickerstaffe; her fellow student, George Washington III; and the Chief of Detectives of the NYPD, Joseph P. Quinn.

When the latter begins asking for Garson's assistance as a sketch artist, Garson assumes the character of Inspector Noserag (whose name is an imperfect reversal of "Garson"), and dubs Dickory his assistant, Sergeant Kod (likewise). The two work together to solve several cases, which divide the book into six sections of four chapters each: "The Mystery in Number 12 Cobble Lane," "The Case of the Horrible Hairdresser," "The Case of the Face on the Five-Dollar Bill," "The Case of the Full-Sized Midget," "The Case of the Disguised Disguise," and "The Case of the Confusing Corpus." Meanwhile, Dickory learns more about the histories, motives and identities of all the people in and around Number 12 Cobble Lane.

== Themes ==
The Tattooed Potato and Other Clues is a mystery aimed at younger readers, and the reader is given all the clues necessary to solve the underlying case; in a common theme of Raskin's books, however, it is not only the answers but the questions themselves that are hidden. The book deals in shifting or hidden identities, crime, loss, and the meaning and purpose of art. Several characters go by pseudonyms, and others are haunted by their own unusual names.

Like Raskin's better-known book, The Westing Game, the book resolves with a number of twists and interconnecting plot threads. Unlike that book, it does not feature an epilogue in which the characters' lives are shown to improve due to the events of the plot.
