= Saturday the 14th Strikes Back =

1988 film by Howard R. Cohen

- Theatrical release poster
- Directed by: Howard R. Cohen
- Written by: Howard R. Cohen
- Produced by: Julie Corman
- Starring: Ray Walston; Avery Schreiber; Patty McCormack; Jason Presson
- Cinematography: Levie Issacks
- Edited by: Bernard Caputo
- Music by: Parmer Fuller
- Distributed by: Concorde Pictures
- Release date: August 5, 1988
- Running time: 78 minutes
- Country: United States
- Language: English

Saturday the 14th Strikes Back (also known as Saturday the 14th Part 2) is a 1988 American comedy horror film written and directed by Howard R. Cohen and produced by Julie Corman. It stars Ray Walston, Avery Schreiber, Patty McCormack and Jason Presson.

Like its predecessor, Saturday the 14th, it is a parody of other horror films, such as Attack of the 50 Foot Woman, Friday the 13th, The Amityville Horror, The Mummy and Invasion of the Body Snatchers.

== Plot ==
Eddie Baxter is on the beach telling the story about what happened when his family inherited a spooky old house through his mother's family. After moving in, he discovers a strange crack running through the length of the basement with smoke coming up through it. The smoke soon starts resulting in strange activity through the house. At night, his father, Frank, is compelled to sculpt figures out of chocolate pudding while his mother, Kate, and sister, Linda, both go into a trance-like state and watch him. The following morning, they do not remember any of their behavior. Although his father tries to seal the crack, he later breaks it open again.

Eddie's aunt and uncle soon move into the house which they believe is rightfully theirs. By now, paranormal beings have started appearing in the basement, and his sister, Linda, discovers her bedroom has turned into an Egyptian tomb. A female vampire named Charlene appears in Eddie's room and gives him a mysterious coin, and Gramps mentions talking to his deceased friend, Leonard.

The following night, everyone but Eddie is in a trance again as his father sculpts from chocolate pudding again. In the basement, Eddie encounters an Egyptian priest named Kharis, who reveals the smoke heralds the release of the forces of evil. Charlene reveals the universe is lining up to release the energies on Saturday the 14th, which is the same day as his birthday. Unable to get his family to take him seriously, Eddie tries sealing up all the openings in the house to keep the smoke from spreading. and calls up a plumber, but the smoke turns him into a chicken. Meanwhile, his sister becomes a giant trapped in her room, the house prevents his father from painting it, the kitchen table spins as Leonard's voice announces he is coming, and the monsters are freely wandering through the house among other strange things. When Eddie successfully blocks all of the smoke from escaping the basement, everything reverts to what passes as normal.

Grandpa turns out to be the only one who believes Eddie's claims, but the smoke eventually builds up and blows down the cellar door. Even more monsters are now moving into the basement, and they tell Eddie that because of his birthday, he is one of them and the worthy successor of the Evil One. However, Eddie just wants to be normal, and his family becomes complacent to all the activity going on. Eddie tries reaching out to his teacher for advice, but she tells him to accept his destiny as the monsters chase him back to the house. Linda gets shrunk down and takes a trip through the pipes of the house before landing full-size in the basement, joining the side of the monsters.

When the monsters have a party in the house, Eddie meets Princess Takatiri, who tells him to give in to his powers. He uses them to conjure cheeseburgers and turn his sister into a rag doll, but the monsters want him to use his power for evil pursuits. He is also told to get rid of his parents as horns appear on his head, but he resists. After Leonard arrives, Eddie learns that his grandfather is not really his grandfather. Gramps reveals he is actually a wizard who moved into the family to watch over him. After testing Eddie over his intentions, Gramps removes his horns and gives him a bell to destroy the monsters while they are all together before midnight. However, he loses the bell twice. Facing the monsters, he ends up trapped in a coffin as the Evil One arrives, but Gramps and Leonard free him. Eddie goes on to battle the Evil One amidst scenes of violence and catastrophes as the crack in the basement expands over the world. When he realizes he still has the coin, he flashes the smiley face on it to the Evil One, driving him away and restoring the world to normal with him and Princess Takatri on the beach.

== Cast ==
- Ray Walston as Gramps Baxter
- Avery Schreiber as Frank Baxter
- Patty McCormack as Kate Baxter
- Jason Presson as Eddie Baxter
- Julianne McNamara as Linda Baxter
- Rhonda Aldrich as Alice
- Daniel Will-Harris as Bert
- Pamela Stonebrook as Charlene
- Joseph Ruskin as Kharis
- Riad Galayini as Princess Takatiri
- Phil Leeds as Leonard
- Leo Gordon as the Evil One (as Leo V. Gordon)
- Victoria Hemingson as The Vampirettes
- Tommy Rall as the Werewolf
- Michael Berryman as the Mummy
- David Workman as the Plumber (as Dave Workman)

== Michael Jackson's Thriller connection ==
The exterior shots of the Baxter household is the exact same Victorian house used in Michael Jackson's Thriller. It is assumed that the producers of Saturday the 14th Strikes Back were inspired by the "Thriller" music video to use the house as the main setting of the movie, as well as the house and neighborhood looking scary. The Victorian house used in the film is at 1345 Carroll Avenue in the Angelino Heights neighborhood of Los Angeles.

== Release ==
Saturday the 14th Strikes Back was released theatrically on August 21, 1988, in Louisville, Kentucky.

== Reception ==
From contemporary reviews, "Lor." of Variety called the film "an unnecessary, unfunny sequel" noting that "dialog is lame and level of spoofing obvious rather than inspired". The review went on to note that a "poverty budget is apparent in chintzy special effects and stillborn ideas like Stonebrook suddenly belting a song with a 3-girl chorus appearing to dance around the room amateurishly". On Rotten Tomatoes, the film has an aggregate score of 29% based on 2 positive and 5 negative critic reviews.
