= Moving Violation (film) =

1976 film by Charles S. Dubin

- Film poster by John Solie
- Directed by: Charles S. Dubin
- Written by: David R. Osterhout; William Norton
- Based on: story by David R. Osterhout
- Produced by: Julie Corman
- Starring: Stephen McHattie
- Cinematography: Charles Correll
- Music by: Don Peake
- Production company: Santa Fe Productions
- Distributed by: 20th Century Fox
- Release date: 1976
- Running time: 91 Minutes
- Country: United States
- Language: English

Moving Violation is a 1976 American action film. It was one of several films Roger Corman produced for 20th Century Fox.

== Plot ==
Drifter Eddie Moore arrives in the small oil town of Rockfield, Texas, where he is picked up and harassed by the town's corrupt sheriff Leroy Rankin and deputy Tylor for violation of town ordinance against hitch-hiking. They dump him at the oil field and order him not to return to the town ever again.

Eddie wanders to a drive-in, where he buys an ice cream and falls in love with shopgirl Camille "Cam" Johnson. Cam then shows him around town in her van, before they drive to the mansion of Mr. H.L. Rockfield, the richest man in the area, and skinny-dip in the pool. Meanwhile, Tylor also arrives at mansion and starts criticizing the business practices of Rockfield. However, what he doesn't know is that Sheriff Rankin is also there and heard every word he said. Outside, Eddie and Cam witness as Rankin and Tylor argue, then Rankin pulls out a gun and shoots Tylor. Tylor manages to stagger away and seek refuge in the back of Cam's van, just as Cam and Eddie arrive flee in the van. Now Rankin wants them dead so that they won't talk, so he sets off in hot pursuit. With the van's back door open from where Tylor staggered in, Rankin shoots inside and shoots him dead. The pursuit ends with Cam crashing the van into the ditch, but she and Eddie survive. As Rankin comes down to investigate, he trips and falls unconscious. Cam and Eddie escape in his car. A hot pursuit ensues as they encounter Rankin's deputies.

After a while, Rankin's car dies, so Eddie and Cam hijack a Cadillac. As they stop at a diner, Eddie tells Cam to call a lawyer, which she does, albeit it's Sunday and so the lawyer isn't working. Just then, the Cadillac's owner arrives, having hitched a ride with United Farm Workers in the back of a pickup truck, and starts to fight Eddie. Cam manages to break up the fight by firing a pistol they took from Tylor in the van. Eddie and Cam escape again in the Cadillac to the next town of Cody, with Rankin, who has called the Cody County sheriff, following. Eddie and Cam manage to evade the sheriff's deputies in a warehouse, before going into a flea store where they call the FBI to report the murder, but are forced to hang up and flee again when the deputies enter the store. They slip out of the back door and steal another car, and another hot pursuit ensues.

Eddie and Cam evade the pursuers, then break into an empty house, where they end up making love under a shower. The next morning, they call lawyer Alex Warren, who agrees to take their case. Warren smuggles them out of town to his house with Eddie in the trunk and Cam with a hat on her head. He then strikes a deal with the attorney general that if the AG calls off the police pursuit, Eddie and Cam will surrender themselves as witnesses in the court.

On the court day, Alex drives off in his station wagon, towing a boat in the back of his station wagon and Eddie and Cam hidden under tarpaulin in the back seat. When he encounters a police patrol, he demands they produce a warrant to search his car, and drives off when they fail to do so. However, Rankin's men are tailing them, and Rankin gets his friends to try to kill Eddie, Cam and Alex to make sure they don't testify. Eddie, Cam and Alex manage to evade them, but just as they arrive near the courthouse, a car drives up and two men shoot at them, killing Alex. Cam screams in terror, while Eddie flees as the crowd waiting outside the courthouse runs to the scene. Cam is left in a catatonic state and is taken to a hospital.

Eddie evades Rankin's patrols, then breaks into the National Guard armory. He obtains a scoped rifle, and at night, shoots at the police cars outside Rockfield police station from a distance, blowing them up. This attracts the attention of Rankin and his deputies, who run outside and start shooting back. Eddie shoots Rankin dead before fleeing from the scene. In the final scene, Cam is shown sitting outside in a psychiatric hospital, still in the catatonic state. Eddie, looking at her from behind the fence, throws a plush toy over the fence, which lands in front of Cam. She then breaks out of her catatonic state and comes to the fence, where she talks to Eddie, who asks her if she can climb over the fence. Cam says she can and the movie ends as she climbs the fence.

== Cast ==
- Stephen McHattie as Eddie Moore
- Kay Lenz as Cam Johnson
- Eddie Albert as Alex Warren
- Lonny Chapman as Sheriff Leroy Rankin
- Will Geer as H.L. Rockfield
- Jack Murdock as Deputy Bubba Burke
- John S. Ragin as Agent Shank
- Dennis Redfield as Tylor
- Michael Ross Verona as Harvey
- Francis De Sales as Lawyer
- Dick Miller as Mack
- Paul Linke as Deputy Frank
