= Rapunzel (book) =

Book by Paul O. Zelinsky retelling the Grimm brothers' "Rapunzel" story

- Author: Paul O. Zelinsky
- Illustrator: Paul O. Zelinsky
- Genre: Children's picture book
- Publisher: Dutton Press
- Publication date: 1997
- Publication place: United States
- ISBN: 978-0-525-45607-0
- OCLC: 36041635
- Dewey Decimal: 398.22 21
- LC Class: PZ8.Z38 Rap 1997

Rapunzel is a children's book written and illustrated by Paul O. Zelinsky and a retelling of the fairy tale of the same name by the Brothers Grimm. Released by Dutton Press, it was the recipient of the Caldecott Medal for illustration in 1998.

The children's book is a faithful retelling of the 1812 original version of Rapunzel, but also contains several elements from Persinette, the French variant of the fairy tale by Charlotte-Rose de Caumont de La Force.

In 1998, a film version of Rapunzel was made by Weston Woods Studios, and narrated by Maureen Anderman.

== Synopsis ==
After years of being childless, a woman informs her husband that she is with child. The wife likes to sit by a window at the back of her house, looking into a sorceress's high-walled garden and the flowers, fruits, and herbs growing in it. The wife soon craves for the rapunzel in the sorceress's garden. Days pass and the wife grows so ill from her craving that she tells her husband that she wants to eat the sorceress's rapunzel. Out of his love for his wife, the husband encircles the garden wall, but finding neither a door nor a gate, he climbs down through the window, into the sorceress's garden, and steals some rapunzel. Upon coming home, the husband gives his wife the rapunzel, who makes a salad out of it and eats it. But the next day, the wife's craving for rapunzel becomes fiercer. Again, the husband enters the garden, only to be confronted by the sorceress, who is outraged by his theft of her rapunzel. When the husband explains his wife's condition, the sorceress allows him take the rapunzel in exchange for his baby. Unwilling to lose his wife, the frightened husband agrees to the bargain.

On the day the couple's baby, a girl, is born, the sorceress names her "Rapunzel" and takes her away. The sorceress raises Rapunzel, who grows to be a beautiful girl with fair skin and long red-gold hair. When Rapunzel turns twelve, the sorceress takes her to a tower in the forest. Standing in the middle of the forest, the tower is thin on the outside, but has spacious rooms on the inside. The tower lacks a door and has only one window at the top. To visit Rapunzel, the sorceress calls out, "Rapunzel, Rapunzel, let down your hair." Whenever she hears those words, Rapunzel unpins her long braids, winds them to a hook on the window frame, and lets them fall to the ground, and the sorceress climbs up.

Years later, a prince rides through the forest and overhears Rapunzel singing to the birds. Charmed by Rapunzel's singing voice, the prince falls in love, but is unable to enter the tower. He asks the people and they inform him of the sorceress and the girl she keeps locked up in the tower. For days, the prince returns to the tower to look at Rapunzel. One day, the prince witnesses the sorceress calling up to Rapunzel and knows how to enter the tower. When the sorceress leaves that evening, the prince calls up to Rapunzel, who lets down her hair and he climbs up. Rapunzel is at first scared for she has never seen a man before, but the prince calms her down. That same evening, Rapunzel and the prince fall in love and marry. As the sorceress visits Rapunzel by day, the prince only visits her by night.

Several months later, the sorceress visits Rapunzel who asks her why her dress is tight around the waist. Outraged, the sorceress cuts off Rapunzel's long hair before banishing her to the wilderness. Some months later, Rapunzel gives birth to her twin children with the prince, a boy and a girl. After banishing Rapunzel, the sorceress hooks her cutoff hair to the window. When the prince comes that evening and calls up to Rapunzel, the sorceress lets down the hair and he climbs up. At the window, the prince is confronted by the enraged sorceress, who tells him that he will never see Rapunzel again. Grief-stricken, the prince lets go of the braids and falls down to the ground. Although the prince survives, he becomes blind.

For a year, the prince wanders from place to place, looking for his wife. Eventually, he arrives at the same wilderness where Rapunzel has been living with their children. One day, the prince hears Rapunzel singing and he rushes to her. Seeing her husband, Rapunzel weeps as she embraces him. Two of Rapunzel's tears fall into the prince's eyes, restoring his sight. The prince then leads his family back to his kingdom where the people welcome them home. Rapunzel, her husband, and their children then live a long happy life together.

== Illustrations ==
Paul O. Zelinsky's illustrations in Rapunzel are heavily influenced by Italian Renaissance art, particularly the paintings and architecture of fifteenth- and sixteenth-century Italy. Zelinsky uses detailed oil paintings to create a sophisticated visual interpretation of the traditional fairy tale. His illustrations feature elaborate architecture, realistic human figures, and detailed landscapes. The influence of Renaissance painters is especially apparent in his use of perspective, composition, and lighting. Rapunzel herself resembles figures found in the paintings of Sandro Botticelli, while the tower and surrounding buildings reflect Italian Renaissance architecture. Zelinsky also uses warm, golden lighting to create a dreamlike atmosphere throughout the story. Beyond their visual beauty, the illustrations communicate the characters' emotions through facial expressions, body language, and changes in setting.

Awards
Preceded by Golem	Caldecott Medal recipient 1998	Succeeded by Snowflake Bentley
