= Strider (novel) =

1991 novel by Beverly Cleary

- Author: Beverly Cleary
- Illustrator: Paul O. Zelinsky
- Cover artist: Paul O. Zelinsky
- Language: English
- Series: 2
- Genre: Children's novel
- Publisher: HarperCollins
- Publication date: September 20, 1991
- Publication place: United States
- Media type: Print (hardback & paperback)
- Pages: 176
- ISBN: 0-380-71236-9
- Preceded by: Dear Mr. Henshaw

Strider is an epistolary novel by children's author Beverly Cleary, the sequel to her Newbery Medal-winning novel Dear Mr. Henshaw. It was first published in 1991; and like Dear Mr. Henshaw, it was illustrated by Paul O. Zelinsky.

== Plot summary ==
Strider takes place two years after the end of Dear Mr. Henshaw, and Leigh Botts has grown a lot. At age 14, he writes in his diary about his experiences with his parents' divorce, starting high school, his friend Barry, a red-haired girl named Geneva, and a dog named Strider, whom he and Barry find abandoned on a beach.

Leigh and Barry decide to share custody of Strider, in the same way divorced parents share custody of their children. However, as time goes on, Barry doesn't seem to take good care of Strider, which causes trouble for Leigh. Finally, feeling desperate, he winds up taking custody of him. He is a dog that loves to run, so they run every morning. Because of Strider, Leigh finds himself running well enough to join the school track team. He also develops a crush on Geneva, who is on the track team.

== Reception ==
Kirkus Reviews called it a "comforting picture of a dear old friend thriving while continuing to work out his problems" and praised Zelinsky's illustrations as an "excellent bonus." Jim Burke of the San Francisco Examiner opined that the novel "reinforces the values of responsibility and devotion without being preachy" and stated that Cleary "gently and invisibly demonstrates how daily events reveal our true emotions." Penelope Lively of The New York Times Book Review called it "brisk, undemanding, conventional but plausible enough" and wrote that "if there is a whiff of therapy, maybe only the curmudgeonly adult reader will be perturbed."
