= Saturday the 14th =

1981 American comedy horror film

- Theatrical release poster
- Directed by: Howard R. Cohen
- Screenplay by: Howard R. Cohen
- Story by: Jeff Begun
- Produced by: Julie Corman
- Starring: Richard Benjamin; Paula Prentiss; Severn Darden; Jeffrey Tambor; Kari Michaelsen
- Cinematography: Daniel Lacambre
- Edited by: Kent Beyda; Joanne D'Antonio
- Music by: Parmer Fuller
- Distributed by: New World Pictures
- Release dates: August 14, 1981; November 20, 1981 (Los Angeles)
- Running time: 77 minutes
- Country: United States
- Language: English
- Box office: $2.2—4 million

Saturday the 14th is a 1981 American comedy horror film starring real-life husband and wife Paula Prentiss and Richard Benjamin, co-written and directed by Howard R. Cohen and produced by Julie Corman.

Despite the implications of the film's title, it is a spoof of classic horror movies from the 1930s and 1940s, and not a parody of the Friday the 13th series or of slasher films of that type from the 1980s. It was followed by Saturday the 14th Strikes Back in 1988.

In the film, the Hyatt family inherits the house of a deceased uncle, and its magical book. The family's son reads the book and unwittingly unleashes monsters from its pages. The family has interactions with the vampire Waldemar and the would-be world-conqueror Van Helsing, who each want to acquire the book.

== Plot ==
An all-American family inherits a deceased uncle's house. John and Mary Hyatt, together with daughter Debbie and son Billy move in, but Waldemar, a vampire, and Yolanda, his wife, want desperately to get into the rundown house because it contains a book of evil.

Billy finds the mysterious book. He reads of a curse hanging over the date of Saturday the 14th. As he turns the page, a monster is unleashed and with each turn, another disappears from the page and is materialized within or outside the home. The house is soon swarming with monsters.

Strange things start happening: eyes appear in John's coffee, sandwiches are mysteriously eaten, the television tunes into The Twilight Zone only, dirt is found in Mary's bed, dishes get done by themselves, neighbors disappear. As this is happening, neither John or Mary suspect anything, completely oblivious to the spooky occurrences around them.

Waldemar gets into the house by turning into a bat. Mary keeps hearing noises at night, which she thinks are made by owls, but are actually the sounds of Waldemar in bat form. John hires an exterminator to get rid of the bats. The exterminator turns out to be Van Helsing, who is also after the book of evil.

John and Mary begin planning a housewarming party for Saturday the 14th. Guests arrive, but they cannot leave. When they try, a thunderstorm appears outside the door. As the night unfolds, the monsters begin to kill the guests one by one.

Eventually a duel between Van Helsing and Waldemar and Yolanda erupts, where it is discovered that Van Helsing wants the book in order to rule the world and Waldemar and Yolanda were only trying to stop him from getting his hands on it. Good triumphs over evil, as Van Helsing and the monsters are defeated.

The Hyatts end up in an upscale new home, while Waldemar and Yolanda keep the original house as their own.

== Cast ==
- Richard Benjamin as John Hyatt, the father of the family
- Paula Prentiss as Mary Hyatt, the mother of the family
- Jeffrey Tambor as Waldemar, vampire looking to buy the house
- Severn Darden as Van Helsing, evil genius disguised as an exterminator
- Kari Michaelsen as Debbie Hyatt, daughter of John and Mary
- Rosemary DeCamp as Aunt Lucille
- Kevin Brando as Billy Hyatt, son of John and Mary
- Nancy Lee Andrews as Yolanda, wife of the vampire Waldermar
- Stacy Keach Sr. as Attorney
- Roberta Collins as Cousin Rhonda
- Paul 'Mousie' Garner as The Major

== Production ==
The film was based on an idea of Jeff Bergun who told it to Howard Cohen. Cohen wrote up a synopsis and sent it to Roger Corman. Corman asked Cohen to write it and Cohen agreed if he could direct.

Julie Corman says "I thought, “This is a lot of fun. I’d like to produce it"." It was one of a number of films Prentiss and Benjamin made together.

Filming took three weeks. Julie Corman recalls Paula Prentiss and Richard Benjamin "had very individual ideas about their characters. I didn’t get the feeling that one dictated to the other. Dick was generally in charge of presenting a message that maybe I wouldn’t like to say to Paula. For example, Paula, who’s supposed to be a vampire in the movie, didn’t want to wear fangs. I thought, “How can I tell Howard that Paula says she’s not wearing these fangs?” Dick assured me, “Trust me, you will believe she’s a vampire.” He was right."

Despite being set in the fictional town of Eerie, Pennsylvania, the Spooky House Exteriors and Interiors, in which the Hyatt Family inherited from their Late Uncle by mistake in the film, is located in the University of Southern California district in Los Angeles at 1190 West Adams Boulevard.

== Release ==
The film was given a limited release theatrically in the United States by New World Pictures on August 14, 1981, opening in cities such as Des Moines, Iowa and Alexandria, Louisiana. It premiered in Los Angeles on November 20.

=== Box office ===
The movie was particularly successful on video leading to a sequel, Saturday the 14th Strikes Back.

Julie Corman reflected, "The appeal seems to be from people who understand film history. That was definitely intentional from Howard and Jeff. They were aficionados of horror films and would get a kick out of putting in references to previous horror films. It’s also a horror film that kids can watch. People are still buying the DVD of the film."

=== Critical response ===
Variety called the film "a pathetic farce which will seem frail even on TV, for which it should probably have been made in the first place...As usual with recent New World productions, the special effects and, in this case, the monster get-ups are actually pretty good, but they exist in a vacuum of inspiration as to what to do with them".

Vincent Canby of The New York Times dismissed it as "an unfunny horror-film parody". Gene Siskel of the Chicago Tribune gave the film one star out of four and labeled it "a feeble comedy with a husband-and-wife star acting team mugging in front of the camera. Comedies don't need stars. They just need jokes, and Saturday the 14th doesn't have many".

Tom Shales of The Washington Post wrote that the film "merely resurrects a passel of haunted-house wheezes so antique that even the Bowery Boys would be driven to groans by them". He thought that children might enjoy it, but "that's really not enough to base a movie on".

Linda Gross of the Los Angeles Times wrote that it was "not a laugh riot, but a silly spoof of horror movies whose appeal probably will be limited to younger people who haven't been exposed to making fun of Dracula for as long as the rest of us".

The film has an approval rating of 9% on Rotten Tomatoes based on 11 reviews.

=== Home media ===
It was later released on VHS and CED Videodisc by Embassy Home Entertainment.

The film was released on DVD by New Concorde Home Entertainment in 2001.

Scream Factory released Blu-ray edition of the film on January 15, 2019.
