= Ray Walston =

American actor (1914–2001)

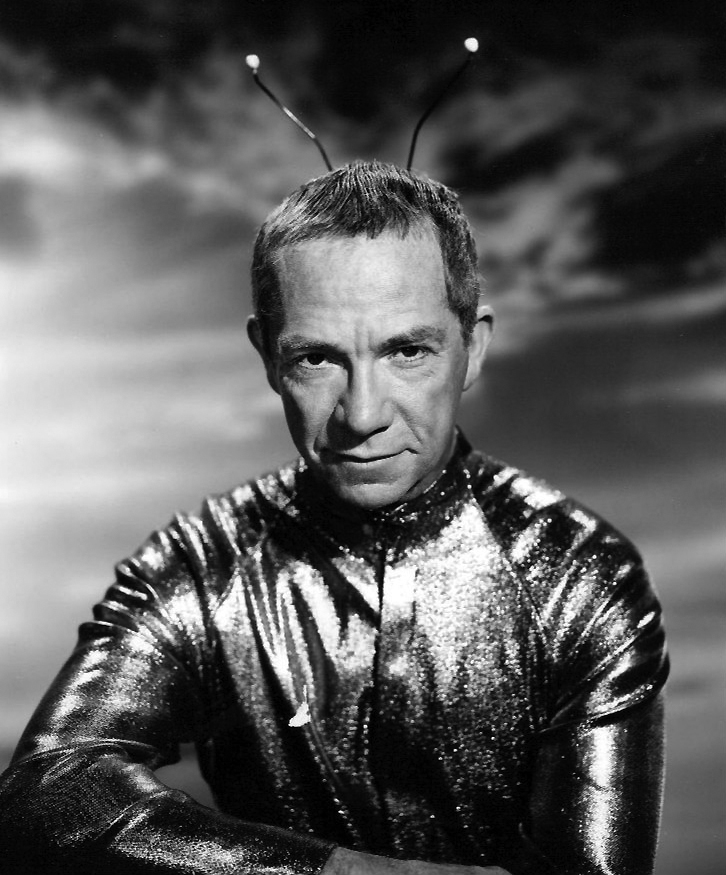
- Walston in My Favorite Martian (1963)
- Born: Herman Ray Walston; November 2, 1914; Laurel, Mississippi, U.S.
- Died: January 1, 2001 (aged 86); Beverly Hills, California, U.S.
- Occupation: Actor
- Years active: 1940s–2000
- Known for: South Pacific; Damn Yankees; My Favorite Martian; The Apartment
- Spouse: Ruth Calvert Walston (m. 1943)
- Children: 1
- Awards: Tony Award for Best Actor in a Musical

Herman Ray Walston (November 2, 1914 – January 1, 2001) was an American actor. He started his career on Broadway earning the Tony Award for Best Actor in a Musical for his performance as Mr. Applegate in Damn Yankees (1956).

He appeared in the films South Pacific (1958), Damn Yankees (1958), The Apartment (1960), Kiss Me, Stupid (1964), Paint Your Wagon (1969), The Sting (1973), Popeye (1980), Fast Times at Ridgemont High (1982), and Of Mice and Men (1992). Walston also starred as the title character on My Favorite Martian and as Glen Bateman in the miniseries The Stand (1994). For his role as Judge Henry Bone in Picket Fences he earned two Primetime Emmy Awards.

== Early life and education ==
Walston was born on November 2, 1914, in Laurel, Mississippi, the second son and youngest of three children born to lumberjack Harry Rex Walston and Camilla "Mittie" (née Kimbrell) Walston.

He started acting at an early age, beginning his tenure as a spear carrier rounding out productions at many New Orleans theaters. He mostly played small roles with stock companies, where he not only starred in traveling shows, but also worked at a movie theater, selling tickets and cleaning the stage floors. His family moved to Dallas, Texas, where he joined a repertory theater company under Margo Jones in 1938. He stayed at the Houston Civic Theater six years, "averaging 12 roles a year."

== Career ==
=== 1945–1957 ===
Walston was popular with Margo Jones' team of actors before he traveled to Cleveland, Ohio, where he spent three years with the Cleveland Play House. He then traveled to New York City, where he made his Broadway debut in a 1945 production of Maurice Evans's The G.I. Hamlet. Three years later, Walston became one of the first members admitted to the newly formed Actors Studio.

In 1949, he appeared in the short-lived play Mrs. Gibbons' Boys, directed by George Abbott, who later cast him as Satan (who bore the name "Mr. Applegate") in the 1955 musical Damn Yankees opposite Gwen Verdon as his sexy aide Lola. The chemistry between the two was such that they both garnered critical success and won awards for their roles. After a decade in New York theater, he won a Tony Award.

He starred as Luther Billis in the 1951 London production of South Pacific. He reprised that role in the 1958 film adaptation. He and Juanita Hall (as Bloody Mary) were the only cast members to appear in both the stage and movie versions. Additional Broadway credits included The Front Page, Summer and Smoke, Richard III, Wish You Were Here, and House of Flowers. In 1957, actress and producer Katharine Cornell placed him in a role on Broadway in Robert E. Sherwood's Pulitzer Prize winning play about the Hungarian Revolution of 1956, There Shall Be No Night. The play was adapted for television for a Hallmark Hall of Fame production. He had a prominent role in the Rodgers & Hammerstein musical Me and Juliet, portraying the stage manager of the musical-within-the-musical, but his character did not participate in any of the musical numbers.

=== 1958–1979 ===
Walston reprised his role in the 1958 film version of Damn Yankees. His other films included Kiss Them for Me; South Pacific; Say One for Me; Tall Story; Portrait in Black; The Apartment; Convicts 4; Wives and Lovers; Who's Minding the Store?; Kiss Me, Stupid; Caprice; Paint Your Wagon; The Sting; Silver Streak; and Get a Clue.

He narrated many United States Department of Defense and Atomic Energy Commission (now United States Department of Energy) films about nuclear experiments, including the Operation Hardtack I nuclear test film series of 1958. He guest starred on numerous television programs, including The Shirley Temple Show, The Americans, and a television version of Going My Way.

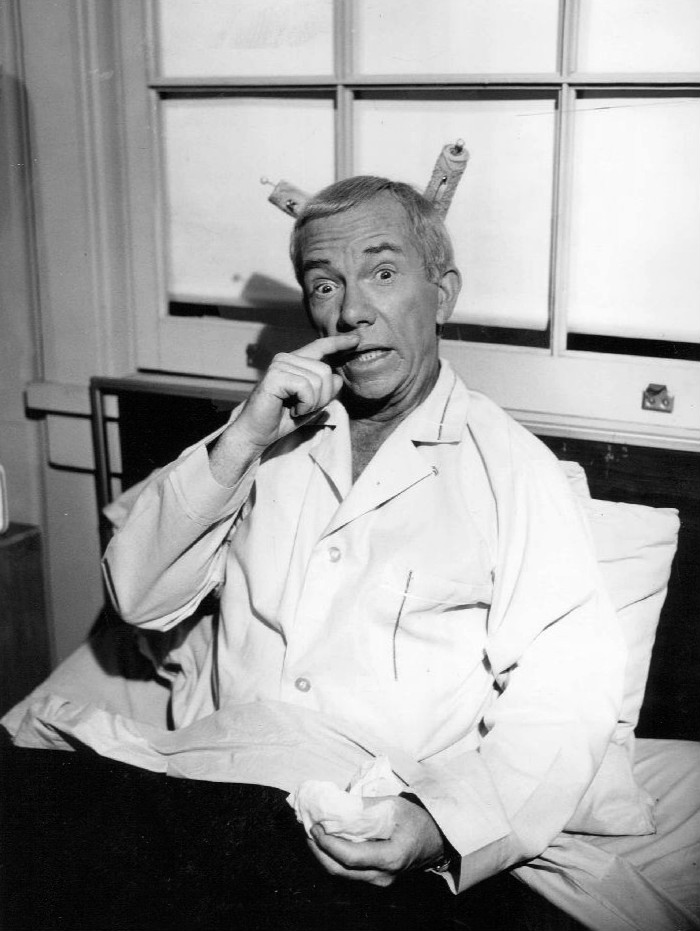
Walston as Uncle Martin in the My Favorite Martian episode "There Is No Cure for the Common Martian" (1963, S1E3)

On TV, Walston appeared as the title character (Uncle Martin) on My Favorite Martian from 1963 to 1966, alongside co-star Bill Bixby. The two became close friends. The show was a top ten hit in its first season, still in the top 30 in its second, dropping to 45th in its third and final season. The success of My Favorite Martian typecast Walston and he had difficulty finding serious roles after the show's cancellation. He returned to character actor status in the 1970s and 1980s, and guest starred in such series as Custer, The Wild Wild West, Love, American Style, The Rookies, Mission: Impossible, Ellery Queen, The Six Million Dollar Man, Buck Rogers in the 25th Century, Little House on the Prairie, and The Incredible Hulk, again with Bixby, in which Walston played Jasper the Magician in an episode called "My Favorite Magician".

=== 1980–1992 ===
From 1980 to 1992, Walston was featured in 14 films, including Galaxy of Terror and Fast Times at Ridgemont High (as well as the 1986 television adaptation) as Mr. Hand. In a 1999 interview, Walston said that he was happy and relieved that when he walked down the street, young fans shouted at him "Mr. Hand" because he had finally broken away from his connection to the Martian role. In 1984, Walston played a judge on an episode of Night Court. Six years later, he made a guest appearance on an episode of L.A. Law. He later was hired for the role of Judge Henry Bone on Picket Fences; the character was originally a recurring role, but Walston proved to be so popular the character was later upgraded to a starring role. In the first season episode, "Remembering Rosemary", Judge Bone wears a Martian costume with antennae to a Halloween party as a nod to Walston's role as Uncle Martin.

He appeared in Star Trek: The Next Generation as Boothby, head groundskeeper at Starfleet Academy in San Francisco, and reprised the role twice on Star Trek: Voyager. In 1988, he guest starred in an episode of the popular horror-fantasy show Friday the 13th: The Series, as a bitter, elderly comic-book artist who uses a demonically cursed comic book to transform himself into a killer robot and murder his erstwhile enemies. In 1992, Walston played the role of Candy in the big-screen remake of John Steinbeck's Of Mice and Men with Gary Sinise and John Malkovich. He also made a cameo appearance as a barman in Madonna's Deeper and Deeper video.

=== 1993–2000 ===
Walston reunited with Sinise in the miniseries adaptation of Stephen King's The Stand. He appeared in an AT&T long distance TV commercial in 1995, in which his dialogue implied he was Uncle Martin from Mars, looking for good rates to talk to fellow Martians living in the United States.

Walston received three Emmy Award nominations for Best Supporting Actor in a Drama Series for his work on Picket Fences, winning twice, in 1995 and 1996. CBS cancelled the show after four seasons in 1996. Walston made a guest appearance in an episode of Dr. Quinn, Medicine Woman entitled "Remember Me", in which he portrayed the father of Jake Slicker, who was stricken with Alzheimer's disease. Walston played Grandfather Walter Addams in Addams Family Reunion (1998). The next year, he appeared in the film remake of his hit series, My Favorite Martian (1999) in the role of Armitan. He appeared in the Touched by an Angel episode, "The Face on the Barroom Floor", which aired on October 15, 2000.

Walston made a cameo in the 7th Heaven episode, "One Hundred", which aired on January 29, 2001, four weeks after his death. His final film role was in the independent film Early Bird Special, which was released later that year.

== Personal life and death ==
Walston married Ruth Calvert on November 3, 1943. The couple had one daughter.

In 1994, Walston was diagnosed with lupus, and as a result, worked less frequently in his final years. On January 1, 2001, Walston died from the disease at his home at Beverly Hills, California, at the age of 86.

== Filmography ==
=== Film ===
- 1957: Kiss Them for Me as Lt. McCann
- 1958: South Pacific as Luther Billis
- 1958: Damn Yankees! as Mr. Applegate
- 1959: Say One for Me as Phil Stanley
- 1960: Tall Story as Professor Leo Sullivan
- 1960: The Apartment as Joe Dobisch
- 1960: Portrait in Black as Cobb
- 1961: The Americans as Whit Bristow
- 1962: Convicts 4 as Iggy
- 1963: Wives and Lovers as Wylie Driberg
- 1963: Who's Minding the Store? as Mr. Quimby
- 1964: Kiss Me, Stupid as Orville J. Spooner
- 1967: Caprice as Stuart Clancy
- 1969: Paint Your Wagon as Mad Jack Duncan
- 1973: The Sting as J.J. Singleton
- 1976: Silver Streak as Mr. Whiney
- 1977: The Happy Hooker Goes to Washington as Senator Sturges
- 1979: Institute for Revenge as Frank Anders
- 1980: Popeye as Poopdeck Pappy
- 1981: Galaxy of Terror as Kore
- 1982: O'Hara's Wife as Walter Tatum
- 1982: Fast Times at Ridgemont High as Mr. Hand
- 1983: Private School as Chauncey
- 1984: Gimme a Break! as Andy
- 1984: The Jerk, Too as Diesel
- 1984: Johnny Dangerously as Vendor
- 1985: O.C. and Stiggs as Gramps
- 1986: The Mouse and the Motorcycle as Matt
- 1986: Rad as Burton Timmer
- 1987: From the Hip as 1st Judge
- 1988: Red River as Groot
- 1988: Paramedics as Heart Attack Victim
- 1988: Blood Relations as Charles McLeod
- 1988: Saturday the 14th Strikes Back as Gramps Baxter
- 1989: A Man of Passion as Basilio
- 1989: Class Cruise as Cappy Connors
- 1989: Oro Fino as Sacacorchos
- 1990: Ski Patrol as Pops
- 1990: Blood Salvage as Mr. Stone
- 1991: Popcorn as Dr. Mnesyne
- 1992: The Player as Ray Walston
- 1992: Of Mice and Men as Candy
- 1996: House Arrest as Chief Rocco
- 1997: Get a Clue as Sandy McSouthers, Barney Northrup, Julian R. Eastman, and Sam Westing
- 1998: Addams Family Reunion as Walter Addams
- 1999: My Favorite Martian as Armitan
- 1999: Swing Vote as Justice Clore Cawley

=== Television ===
- 1963-66: My Favorite Martian (TV series) as The Martian/Uncle Martin
- 1970s: Math Country as Lionel Hardway
- 1972: The Paul Lynde Show as Mr. Temura
- 1972: Mission Impossible as Dr. Victor Flory
- 1974: The Rookies (S3, Ep14) as Harry Melrose
- 1976: The Six Million Dollar Man as Horton Budge
- 1978: The Love Boat as a cruise ship passenger
- 1979: Buck Rogers in the 25th Century as Roderick Zale
- 1979: Cliffhangers (11 episodes) as Bob Richards
- 1979: Starsky and Hutch (S4, Ep13) as Tommy Reese
- 1979: The Incredible Hulk (S3, Ep5) as Jasper the Magician
- 1979: Little House on the Prairie (The King is Dead) as Jimmy Hart
- 1982: Fame (1982 TV series) (NBC) as Birdie Whelan
- 1982: Hart to Hart (TV series) as Elliott Laurence
- 1982: The Littlest Hobo S3 E16 as Charlie
- 1984: The Love Boat S8 E13 as Max Phelps in the Christmas-themed vignette "Santa, Santa, Santa"
- 1984: Santa Barbara as Mr. Bottoms
- 1984: Night Court (TV series) as Judge Martin A. Landis
- 1984: Newhart as Claude Darling
- 1985: Silver Spoons (TV series) as Uncle Harry
- 1985: Misfits of Science (TV series) as Barney
- 1987: Murder, She Wrote (TV series) as Q.L. Frubson
- 1987: The Law & Harry McGraw (episode "State of the Art") as Matthew O'Meara
- 1988: Friday the 13th: The Series (TV series) as Jay Star (episode: "Tales of the Undead")
- 1989: I Know My First Name Is Steven (TV movie) as Bob Augustine
- 1990: L.A. Law as Gus Nivens
- 1990: Angel of Death as Prison Librarian Jenkins
- 1991: Dream On (TV Series) (Season 2 Ep 12: "The Charlotte Letter") as Father Augustine
- 1991: Ralph S. Mouse as Matt
- 1992: Star Trek: The Next Generation as Boothby
- 1992: Eerie, Indiana (episode "The Loyal Order of Corn") as Ned
- 1992: The Commish (Season 2 Ep 5: The Witches of Eastbridge) as Burt Hagstone
- 1992: Space Case as Bert
- 1992-96: Picket Fences (TV series) as Judge Henry Bone
- 1994: The Stand as Glen Bateman
- 1996: Project ALF as Motel Manager
- 1997: Get a Clue (1997 film) (TV movie) in multiple roles
- 1998-99: Star Trek: Voyager (TV series) Boothby (2 episodes)
- 2000: Touched by an Angel (TV series) as Benjamin Clay
- 2001: Early Bird Special as Pappy
- 2001: 7th Heaven (TV series) as Sgt. Millard Holmes

== Awards and nominations ==
Year	Association	Category	Nominated work	Result	Ref.
1956	Tony Award	Best Actor in a Musical	Damn Yankees	Won	
1994	Primetime Emmy Award	Outstanding Supporting Actor in a Drama Series	Picket Fences	Nominated	
1995	Primetime Emmy Award	Outstanding Supporting Actor in a Drama Series	Picket Fences	Won	
1996	Primetime Emmy Award	Outstanding Supporting Actor in a Drama Series	Picket Fences	Won	
1995	Screen Actors Guild Awards	Outstanding Ensemble in a Drama Series	Picket Fences	Nominated	
1996	Screen Actors Guild Awards	Outstanding Ensemble in a Drama Series	Picket Fences	Nominated	
1995	Star on the Hollywood Walk of Fame			Received	
