= Naomi Lazard =

American poet, author and playwright (1928–2021)

- Born: Naomi Katz; March 17, 1928 Philadelphia, Pennsylvania, United States
- Died: December 22, 2021 (aged 93) Englewood, New Jersey, United States
- Occupation: Poet; Translator; Children's author; Playwright

Naomi Lazard (March 17, 1928 - December 22, 2021) was an American poet, children's literature author, and playwright. She was the winner of two Fellowships from the National Endowment for the Arts and a former president of the Poetry Society of America. Her translations of Faiz Ahmed Faiz have been widely acclaimed.

== Biography ==
She has published three volumes of poetry: Cry of the Peacocks (Harcourt, Brace & World; 1967), The Moonlit Upper Deckerina (Sheep Meadow Press, 1977), and Ordinances (Ardis, 1984). The poems in Ordinances are notable for their "dark Orwellian tone" - describing life lived under a monstrous, faceless bureaucracy.

She also brought out The True Subject: Selected Poems of Faiz Ahmed Faiz, a volume of translations from the work of Pakistani poet Faiz Ahmed Faiz. She has also translated the works of Romanian poet Nina Cassian.

She is also the author of the children’s book What Amanda Saw (illustrated by Paul O. Zelinsky). She also wrote the screenplay The White Raven, and the play, The Elephant and the Dove.

In 1992, Lazard co-founded the Hamptons International Film Festival.

Despite her prominence as a poet, Lazard is considered a "poet's poet" and not very well known in broader circles. Her poems have been anthologized in Joy Katz and Kevin Prufer's Dark Horses: Poets on Overlooked Poems (2007) and in Czeslaw Milosz's anthology, The Book of Luminous Things (1996). Her poem, To Answer Your Query, has been read by Garrison Keillor on National Public Radio.

== Bibliography ==
- Cry of the Peacocks (1967)
- The Moonlit Upper Deckerina (1977)
- What Amanda Saw (1981) (illustrated by Paul O. Zelinsky)
- Ordinances (1984)
