= Doc (1975 TV series) =

American sitcom

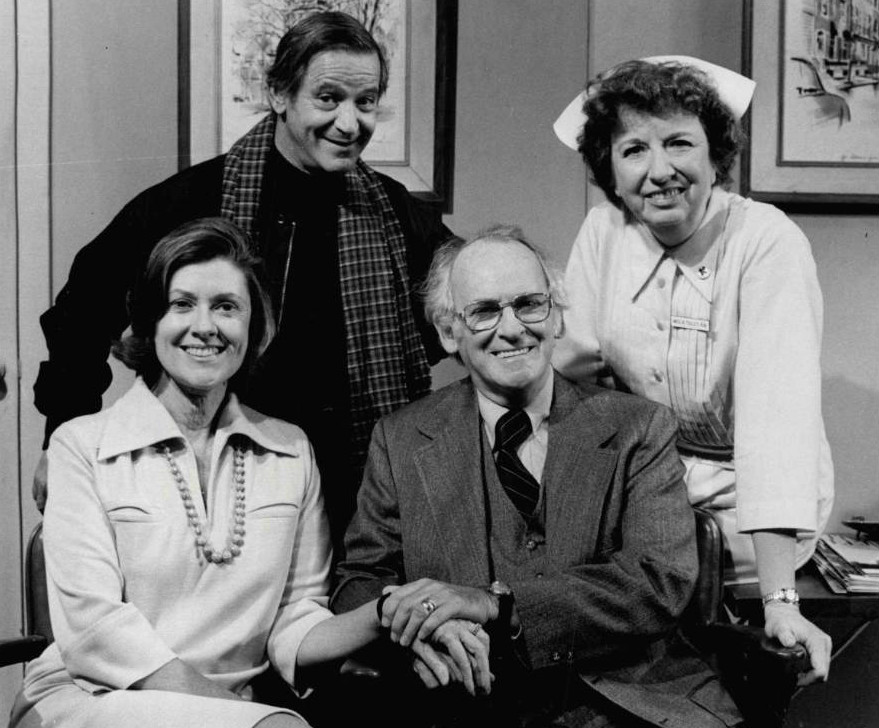
- Standing, L-R: Irwin Corey and Mary Wickes. Seated: Elizabeth Wilson and Barnard Hughes (1975)
- Genre: Sitcom
- Created by: Ed. Weinberger; Stan Daniels
- Directed by: Jeff Bleckner; Burt Brinckerhoff; Bob Claver; Marty Cohan; Joan Darling; Robert Moore; Mel Shapiro; Dennis Steinmetz; Howard Storm
- Starring: Barnard Hughes
- Theme music composer: Stan Daniels
- Composers: Richard DeBenedictis; Patrick Williams
- Country of origin: United States
- Original language: English
- No. of seasons: 2
- No. of episodes: 29

Production
- Executive producers: Stan Daniels; Ed. Weinberger
- Producers: Norman Barasch; Laurence Marks; Carroll Moore; Paul Wayne
- Running time: 30 mins.
- Production company: MTM Enterprises

Original release
- Network: CBS
- Release: August 16, 1975 – October 30, 1976

Doc is an American sitcom produced by MTM Enterprises which aired on CBS from August 16, 1975, to October 30, 1976.

== Synopsis ==
Doc starred Barnard Hughes as Dr. Joe Bogert, an elderly, kindhearted general practitioner who divided his time between dealing with his dysfunctional patients and his even more dysfunctional family. Hughes had been seen occasionally on the CBS-TV sitcoms All in the Family as Father John Majeski and on The Bob Newhart Show as Bob's father Herb Hartley. On Doc, actress Elizabeth Wilson costarred with Hughes as Joe's wife Annie, Judith Kahan as his daughter Laurie, John Harkins as Laurie's husband, and Mary Wickes as Joe's nurse, Tully.

During the first season, the show had good ratings, partially due to its timeslot (Saturdays at 8:30 p.m., sandwiched between mega-hits The Jeffersons and The Mary Tyler Moore Show). CBS, however, thought the ratings should be better considering the scheduling and ordered that the show be reworked. When it returned in the fall of 1976, the format had been substantially changed, with Dr. Bogert now a widower, working at a down-and-out city clinic. Mary Wickes was the only other cast member from the first season to remain, but she departed after the first episode. Ratings slipped and the series was canceled in October 1976 after five episodes. Shortly after the series ended, Hughes returned to The Bob Newhart Show to guest-star in a Christmas episode in December 1976.

== Cast ==
- Barnard Hughes as Dr. Joe "Doc" Bogert
- Elizabeth Wilson as Annie Bogert (season 1)
- Judith Kahan as Laurie Bogert Fenner (season 1)
- John Harkins as Fred Fenner (season 1)
- Mary Wickes as Nurse Beatrice Tully
- Irwin Corey as Happy Miller (season 1)
- Audra Lindley as Janet Scott (season 2)
- David Ogden Stiers (Stanley Moss (season 2)
- Herbie Faye as Ben Goldman (season 2)
- Ray Vitte as Woody Henderson (season 2)

== Episodes ==
=== Season 1 (1975–76) ===
| No. overall | No. in season | Title | Directed by | Written by | Original release date | Prod. code |
|---|---|---|---|---|---|---|
| 1 | 1 | "Doc" | Robert Moore | David Lloyd | August 16, 1975 | 884-884 |
| 2 | 2 | "Get Me to the Church" | Joan Darling | David Lloyd | September 13, 1975 | 884-687 |
| 3 | 3 | "The Other Woman" | David Lloyd | David Lloyd | September 20, 1975 | 884-692 |
| 4 | 4 | "Upstairs, Downstairs" | Joan Darling | David Lloyd | September 27, 1975 | 884-690 |
| 5 | 5 | "Quartet" | Burt Brinckerhoff | Earl Pomerantz | October 4, 1975 | 884-863 |
| 6 | 6 | "Not My Bag" | Burt Brinckerhoff | Adele Styler & Burt Styler | October 11, 1975 | 884-864 |
| 7 | 7 | "Dog vs. Doc" | Burt Brinckerhoff | Phil Davis | October 18, 1975 | 884-688 |
| 8 | 8 | "A Thief for All Seasons" | Burt Brinckerhoff | Bruce Kane | October 25, 1975 | 884-691 |
| 9 | 9 | "Fred's Wild Oats" | Bob Lally | David Lloyd | November 1, 1975 | 884-683 |
| 10 | 10 | "Heal Thyself" | Joan Darling | Glen and Les Charles | November 8, 1975 | 884-684 |
| 11 | 11 | "Benson Hedges" | Joan Darling | Sol Wendell & Beverly Gordon | November 15, 1975 | 884-686 |
| 12 | 12 | "Operation Goldman" | Howard Storm | Dennis Klein | November 29, 1975 | 884-685 |
| 13 | 13 | "My Son, the Doctor" | Howard Storm | Tony Webster | December 6, 1975 | 884-689 |
| 14 | 14 | "The Rivalry" | Jeff Bleckner | Robert Illes & James R. Stein | December 13, 1975 | 884-693 |
| 15 | 15 | "Facts of Life" | Tony Mordente | Seth Freeman | December 20, 1975 | 884-685 |
| 16 | 16 | "And Baby Makes Eight" | Dennis Steinmetz | Tony Webster | January 3, 1976 | 903-555 |
| 17 | 17 | "A Little Bit of Soap" | Martin Cohan | Dennis Klein | January 10, 1976 | 903-554 |
| 18 | 18 | "Great Expectations" | Howard Storm | Jack Mendelsohn & George Burditt | January 17, 1976 | 903-561 |
| 19 | 19 | "Nurse Annie" | Mel Shapiro | Roy Kammerman | January 24, 1976 | 903-561 |
| 20 | 20 | "A Quiet Anniversary" | Howard Storm | David Lloyd | January 31, 1976 | 903-563 |
| 21 | 21 | "Oldies but Goodies" | Howard Storm | Seth Freeman | February 7, 1976 | 903-559 |
| 22 | 22 | "The Death of a Turtle" | Howard Storm | Tony Webster | February 14, 1976 | 903-557 |
| 23 | 23 | "My Son, the Father" | Howard Storm | George Burditt and Jack Mendelsohn | February 21, 1976 | 903-552 |
| 24 | 24 | "All Work and No Pay" | Bob Claver | Norman Barasch & Carroll Moore | February 28, 1976 | 903-558 |

=== Season 2 (1976) ===
| No. overall | No. in season | Title | Directed by | Written by | Original release date | Prod. code |
|---|---|---|---|---|---|---|
| 25 | 1 | "Carry on Nurse, Please" | Tony Mordente | Laurence Marks & Martin Cohan | September 25, 1976 | 6101 |
| 26 | 2 | "Come Scrub with Me" | Tony Mordente | Story by : Thad Mumford; Teleplay by : Thad Mumford and Ed Jurist & Wayne Kline | October 2, 1976 | 6103 |
| 27 | 3 | "EKG and Vote for Me" | Russ Petranto | Howard Albrecht and Sol Weinstein | October 9, 1976 | 6108 |
| 28 | 4 | "Mama Doc" | Russ Petranto | Story by : Ron Pearlman; Teleplay by : Ed Jurist | October 16, 1976 | 6107 |
| 29 | 5 | "The Westside Clinic and Deli" | Bob Lally | Tom Reeder | October 30, 1976 | 6109 |
| 30 | 6 | "A Little Night Visitor" | Bob Lally | Howard Albrecht and Sol Weinstein | Unaired | 6102 |
| 31 | 7 | "And Stanley Makes Three" | Bob Lally | Tony Webster | Unaired | 6110 |
