= Get a Clue (1997 film) =

1997 film by Terence H. Winkless

- Also known as: The Westing Game
- Genre: Family; Horror; Mystery
- Based on: The Westing Game by Ellen Raskin
- Written by: Dylan Kelsey Hadley
- Directed by: Terence H. Winkless
- Starring: Ray Walston; Ashley Peldon; Diane Ladd; Sally Kirkland; Cliff De Young
- Theme music composer: Parmer Fuller
- Country of origin: United States
- Original language: English

Production
- Producer: Julie Corman
- Production locations: Milwaukee, Wisconsin; Glendale, California
- Cinematography: Kurt Brabbee
- Editor: Jim Makiej
- Running time: 95 minutes (approx.)
- Production companies: Hallmark Entertainment; Showtime; Showtime Pictures; Trinity Pictures

Original release
- Network: Showtime
- Release: September 14, 1997

Get a Clue is a 1997 live-action film based on the Newbery Medal-winning book The Westing Game.

The film draws young viewers into the strange mysteries encountered by 13-year-old Turtle and her sister, Angela Wexler. After moving into a new town, Turtle learns the house next door is the notoriously haunted Westing mansion. Discovering the body of the dead millionaire, Turtle attempts to solve the case in hopes of receiving a $20 million reward. The adventure stars Ashley Peldon, Diane Ladd, Sally Kirkland, and Ray Walston.

== Cast ==
- Ray Walston as Sandy McSouthers, Barney Northrup, Julian R. Eastman and Sam Westing
- Ashley Peldon as Tabitha Ruth Wexler "Turtle" or "Alice" T.R
- Diane Ladd as Berthe Erica Crow
- Sally Kirkland as Sydelle Pulaski
- Cliff De Young as Jake Wexler
- Sandy Faison as Grace Wexler
- June Christopher as Judge J.J. Ford
- Lewis Arquette as Otis Amber
- Diane Nadeau as Angela Wexler
- Billy Morrissette as Ed Plum
- Jim Lau as James Shin Hoo
- Shane West as Chris
- Ernest Liu as Doug Hoo

== Reception ==
Tony Scott of Variety called the film a "satisfactory kid-pleaser" and an "intricate, complex romp whose outre characters and labyrinthine plot could use polishing". Sharon Johnson of The Patriot-News called it a "rip-off" and wrote that "this overly long, not very involving mystery isn't much of a movie."
