= Dear Mr. Henshaw =

1983 novel by Beverly Cleary

- First edition
- Author: Beverly Cleary
- Illustrator: Paul O. Zelinsky
- Language: English
- Genre: Young adult
- Publisher: William Morrow
- Publication date: August 1983
- Publication place: United States
- Media type: Print (hardback & paperback)
- Pages: 144 pp
- ISBN: 0-688-02405-X
- OCLC: 9371228
- LC Class: PZ7.C5792 De 1983
- Followed by: Strider

Dear Mr. Henshaw is a juvenile epistolary novel by Beverly Cleary and illustrator Paul O. Zelinsky that was awarded the Newbery Medal in 1984. Based on a 2007 online poll, the National Education Association listed the book as one of its "Teachers' Top 100 Books for Children".

== Plot summary ==
Every school year, Leigh Botts writes a letter to his favorite author, Boyd Henshaw. In the 6th grade, Leigh's class has an assignment to write letters to their favorite authors. Leigh includes all the questions he was given as a numbered list. Mr. Henshaw writes back, teases Leigh for not doing research, and includes more questions for the boy to answer. Leigh is angry and at first refuses to answer. When Leigh's mother finds out, she demands he show Mr. Henshaw the courtesy of a reply.

Through his answers to Mr. Henshaw, Leigh's concerns and conflicts are revealed. He struggles with his parents' divorce, being the new kid in school, his relationship with a neglectful father, and a school lunch thief. In a later letter, Mr. Henshaw encourages him to keep a diary of his thoughts and feelings. Leigh is reconciled to the writer, and his new diary is at first written to a Mr. Pretend Henshaw.

Through writing this diary, Leigh learns to accept the parts of his life he cannot change. He must deal with problems that many other children also have to cope with, such as feeling lonely because he is new in town and completing school assignments. His parents will never remarry, he can never fully depend on his father, and he must find adult ways to deal with "bad things", such as not finding the person who still steals his lunch and having to constantly replace the batteries in his lunch box burglar alarm.

Leigh decides to write for the Young Writers club. When he is unable to turn out a story or poem for a school writing contest, he writes a memory of when he and his father hauled grapes to a factory. This earns him an honorable mention in the school yearbook. When one of the contestants turns out to have cheated, Leigh earns her place for lunch with a famous author. Even though the author is not Mr. Henshaw, she compliments Leigh's story.

== Background ==
Cleary said she began the novel after "two little boys who didn't know one another asked me to write about a boy whose parents were divorced. And I had never thought about it, but I said I'd—give it a try."

== Reception ==
Kirkus Reviews said of the book, "All of this, in Leigh's simple words, is capably and unobtrusively structured as well as valid and realistic. From the writing tips to the divorced-kid blues, however, it tends to substitute prevailing wisdom for the little jolts of recognition that make the Ramona books so rewarding." In a retrospective essay about the Newbery Medal–winning books from 1976 to 1985, literary critic Zena Sutherland wrote, "Perhaps because Cleary so deftly shows her protagonist changing there seems no need for alternate voices or viewpoints to give breadth to the story. Its immediacy never becomes too intense; its humor never makes light of the seriousness of the theme. A gem in 1983, the year of its publication, it is still a gem as the years pass."

== Sequel ==
In 1991, Cleary published a sequel, Strider. Like Dear Mr. Henshaw, it was illustrated by Paul O. Zelinsky.

Strider takes place two years after the end of Dear Mr. Henshaw. Leigh, now 14 and starting high school, writes in his diary about his parents' divorce, his crush on a red-haired girl named Geneva, and a dog named Strider, whom he and his friend Barry find abandoned on a beach. Leigh and Barry decide to share custody of Strider, in the same way divorced parents share custody of their children.

== See also ==
Awards
| Preceded by Dicey's Song | Newbery Medal recipient 1984 | Succeeded by The Hero and the Crown |
