= Da (film) =

1988 American film directed by Matt Clark

- Theatrical release poster
- Directed by: Matt Clark
- Written by: Hugh Leonard (play and screenplay)
- Produced by: Julie Corman
- Starring: Barnard Hughes; Martin Sheen; William Hickey; Doreen Hepburn; Karl Hayden
- Cinematography: Alar Kivilo
- Edited by: Nancy Nuttal Beyda
- Music by: Elmer Bernstein
- Distributed by: FilmDallas Pictures
- Release dates: April 29, 1988 (New York City); July 1988 (U.S.)
- Running time: 102 minutes
- Country: United States
- Language: English
- Budget: $3 million

Da is a 1988 American film directed by Matt Clark, produced by Julie Corman, and starring Martin Sheen, Barnard Hughes, reprising his Tony Award-winning Broadway performance, and William Hickey. The screenplay was written by Irish playwright and journalist Hugh Leonard, who adapted it from his 1978 play Da, with additional material from his autobiographical book Home Before Night.

== Plot ==
Charlie is a playwright in New York who must travel to Ireland to oversee the burial of his father, "Da". During his time there he visits his childhood home in Dalkey, and is visited by the spirit of his deceased father. Charlie then travels down memory lane, reliving both happy and sad memories.

== Cast ==
- Barnard Hughes as Nick Tynan
- Martin Sheen as Charlie Tynan
- William Hickey as Drumm
- Doreen Hepburn as Maggie Tynan
- Ingrid Craigie as Polly
- Joan O'Hara as Mrs. Prynne
- Karl Hayden as Young Charlie Tynan
- Peter Hanly as Young Oliver
- Hugh O'Conor as Boy Charlie Tynan
- Jill Doyle as Mary "The Yellow Peril" Tate

== Reception ==
Roger Ebert said, "Da is in many ways a predictable movie; we know from the beginning more or less where it will have to go, and so it does. The texture of the performances and the writing are what make it worth seeing." On Rotten Tomatoes, it has a score of 64%, from 11 reviews.

== Home media ==
A DVD transfer of Da was released in Australia by Payless Entertainment.
