= Dennis Flanagan =

American editor

Dennis Flanagan (July 22, 1919 in New York City – January 14, 2005 in New York City) was the founding editor of the modern Scientific American magazine. In 1947, Flanagan, Donald H. Miller, Jr., under the leadership of Gerard Piel, acquired and reorganized the then 102-year-old Scientific American.

Flanagan was the editor of Scientific American for more than 37 years starting in 1947. He was first married to author Geraldine Lux Flanagan, with whom he had two children, Cara Louise Flanagan and John Gerard Flanagan; then to author Ellen Raskin, and subsequently to editor Barbara Williams Flanagan.
