= Vaino: A Boy of New Finland =

1929 children's novel by Julia Davis Adams

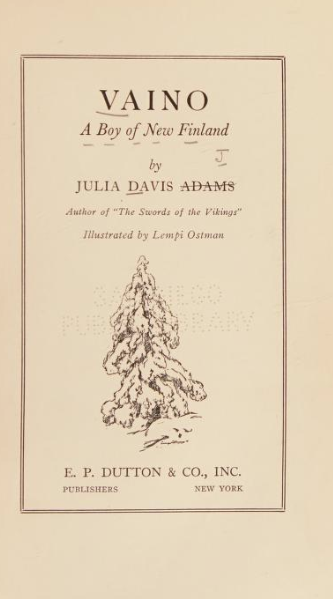
- Title page for Vaino: A Boy of New Finland (1929)
- Author: Julia Davis Adams
- Illustrator: Lempi Ostman
- Language: English
- Genre: Children's literature
- Publisher: E. P. Dutton
- Publication date: 1929
- Publication place: United States
- Pages: 273
- OCLC: 1599013

Vaino: A Boy of New Finland is a 1929 children's novel written by American author Julia Davis Adams and illustrated by Lempi Ostman. Set during the Finnish Civil War, it follows Vaino's life in Helsinki doing what he can to help his country win the war and is interspersed with stories from the Kalevala. It was awarded a Newbery Honor in 1930.
