= Anne Isaacs =

American children's book writer (born 1949)

Anne Isaacs (born March 2, 1949) is an American writer known for her children's books and young adult literature.

== Early life and education ==
Isaacs was born in 1949, in Buffalo, New York, and lived there until she left for college in 1967.

She has a Bachelors' degrees in English Literature and Environmental Education, and a Master of Science degree (1975), all from the University of Michigan.

Isaacs married Samuel Koplowicz, a media producer, in 1978. She lives in Berkeley, California.

== Career ==
Isaacs held a series of positions in the field of environmental education until the mid-1980s. She took on writing fiction as a second profession.

Isaacs is known as the writer of Swamp Angel, a picture book illustrated by Paul O. Zelinsky and published by Dutton Children's Books in 1994. Zelinsky was a runner-up for the annual Caldecott Medal for this work. In 2014, Swamp Angel was a runner-up (Honor Book) for the Phoenix Picture Book Award from the Children's Literature Association.

"All my life", says Isaacs, "poetry has affected me more than any other genre. I have read, memorized, studied, loved, and written it since I was nine." As a child she has called herself "shy and usually lost in a world of my imagination. I read constantly from fourth grade on, plucking books haphazardly from my parents' or the library's shelves: Romeo and Juliet, Lorna Doone, The Wind in the Willows, The Caine Mutiny. In fourth grade I was changed forever by my first readings of Shakespeare and Coleridge. I was spellbound by their emotional directness, interweaving of thought and feeling, and above, all, the pure music of their words. I read Little Women more times than any other book."

== Major works ==
=== Swamp Angel ===
Isaacs and illustrator Paul O. Zelinsky produced a book about a woodswoman named Angelica Longrider.

The book won the place of the 1995 Caldecott Honor book, along with the 1995 Boston Globe–Horn Book Award Honor Book, 1994 ALA Notable Book, The New York Times Best Illustrated Books of 1994, School Library Journal Best Books of 1994, ALA Booklist Children's Editors Choices 1994, Publishers Weekly Best Books of 1994, TIME's 8 Best Children's Books 1994, Parenting Magazine Reading-Magic Award, 10 Best Books of 1994, and the 1995 Notable Trade Book in Language Arts.

=== Treehouse Tales ===
Isaacs' book Treehouse Tales is about the fairytale-like adventures of three 1880s Pennsylvania farm children. The stories are semi-autobiographical, taken from humorous experiences at a girl scout camp where Isaacs was a counselor, although Issacs changed the name and focal point to make it more child appropriate.

=== Cat Up a Tree ===
A book of poetry by Isaacs focuses on what she considers a completely ordinary situation: a cat stuck in a tree. The story unfolds one poem at a time, presenting different characters, all of whom think they know best what to do with the cat.

=== Torn Thread ===
Based on the true story of her mother-in-law, Isaacs writes a story about a girl named Eva. In 1943, in Poland, the life of 12-year-old Eva turns when her sick sister is seized by the Nazis in a raid on the Jewish ghetto. In an effort to save both of his daughters, their father sends Eva to join her sister in a Nazi labor camp, where the girls are used as child labor to spin thread on machinery to make blankets for the German army. As she struggles amid ever-worsening conditions to save her life and that of her sick sister, Eva overcomes many challenges, including the lack of clothing and food. These two teenagers strive to create home and family for each other amidst the inhumanity and chaos that made up Nazi Germany.

The book has been awarded with the Outstanding International Book, Notable Book for a Global Society 2000, American Library Association: Notable Book, Best Books for Young Adults, 2000, National Jewish Book Award Finalist, Booklist: Best of the Year—Holocaust Literature for Youth, 2000, New York Public Library's 100 Titles for Reading and Sharing, 2000, Sydney Taylor Honor Book, Notable Book for Young Readers Pick of the Lists, American Booksellers Association, Smithsonian Notable Book for Children, and the Children's Literature Choice Book.

=== Pancakes for Supper ===
Pancakes for Supper features little blonde-haired Toby. When her family's wagon hits a bump, Toby Littlewood is hurled into the sky and lands in a forest. There, she meets a porcupine, a bear, and a hungry cougar, among other fearsome creatures. Cleverly, she talks each one out of eating her by offering up her fancy clothes. In the end, in a competition to be the grandest beast, the vain animals chase each other around and around a maple tree, where they turn into maple syrup that she eats on her pancakes for supper. The story is a folksy storytelling offering a twist to The Story of Little Black Sambo.

=== The Ghosts of Luckless Gulch ===
The Ghosts of Luckless Gulch (Atheneum Books, 2008), illustrated by Dan Santat, takes place at the cusp of the California Gold Rush in 1848. Estrella, a Latina, is able to run so fast, that she burns up the air, and leaves a trail of flames wherever she runs on her father's rancho north of San Francisco. Her pets - a Kickle Snifter, a Sidehill Wowser, and a Rubberado puppy - are based on 19th-century tall tales and Pourquoi stories, or origin myths. Estrella has the power to heal them, along with wild animals she encounters. When the Ghosts of Luckless Gulch steal her pets, and come up with a sure-fire plan to steal all the gold in California, Estrella finds the need to use her powers to save the day.

Isaacs was living in Petaluma, California, while she wrote this book, near Rancho Petaluma Adobe, the former home of General Mariano Vallejo, now the last remaining "rancho" house and a state historic park. The Petaluma Adobe provided her with a model home for Estrella. The Vallejo family became the model for Estrella's family. The State Historic Parks District Interpretation library and the UC Berkeley's Bancroft Library provided many historic details regarding Northern California landscape and life during the early years of the Gold Rush. The towns, supplies, prices, and most of the settings were all historically researched by Isaacs.

=== Dust Devil ===
Isaacs and Zelinsky completed a sequel to Swamp Angel more than 15 years later, called Dust Devil, published by Schwartz & Wade in 2010. Swamp Angel has a reputation as the greatest woodswoman in all of Tennessee. But when she grows too big for that state, she moves to Montana. It's there that she wrestles a raging storm to the ground and, at its center, finds herself a sidekick - a horse she names Dust Devil. And when Backward Bart, an outlaw, starts terrorizing the prairie, Angel and Dust Devil are the only ones strong enough to stop him.
