= Math Country =

Math Country is an instructional television program produced by Kentucky Educational Television, in the late 1970s.

The show taught elementary math concepts and featured actor Ray Walston as a ghost named Lionel Hardway who inhabits the family farm, now lived in and ran by his descendants, helping them with various math problems, and sometimes getting involved in side stories involving the living members of the Hardway family.

Episodes were roughly 15 minutes in length (design for use during limited classroom time) and were broadcast on educational and public television channels during the school year.

Each broadcast was usually followed by a short called "Math Country Plus", which usually dealt with how a girl in school figured out how to solve problems on her own, using her own creativity and intellect, played by two actors who interacted with the girl on a fantasy set to represent the inside of the girl's head.
