= Figgs & Phantoms =

1974 children's novel

- First edition
- Author: Ellen Raskin
- Language: English
- Genre: Young adult novels
- Publisher: Dutton
- Publication date: 1974
- Publication place: United States

Figgs & Phantoms is a comic young adult novel written and illustrated by Ellen Raskin and published by Dutton in 1974. It was a Newbery Honor Book.

== Plot ==
The story centers on Mona Lisa Figg Newton, a teenage girl living in the fictional town of Pineapple with her eccentric family, including: her tap dancing mother, Sister Figg Newton; her uncles, Truman the Human Pretzel, Romulus the Walking Book of Knowledge, Remus the Talking Adding Machine, and Kadota with his Nine Performing Kanines; and her cousin Fido. The only family member Mona gets along with is her uncle Florence, a book dealer. A main concern of the characters is Capri, the Figg family heaven, which involves a ritual passed down through the Figg family for generations. Uncle Florence's greatest wish is to find his Capri. Mona's greatest fear is that her uncle will succeed and leave her alone.

One of the novel's unusual characteristics is its interactive status. The opening pages classify it as a "mysterious romance or a romantic mystery," but the book never mentions the mystery again. Rather, to unravel the truth about some of the novel's most mysterious happenings, readers must follow the trail of literature, history and music that Florence leaves behind him, by investigating the writings of Joseph Conrad, William Blake and Gilbert and Sullivan. While the book can be read on its own as a surrealistic journey, solving the mystery leads to greater insight into the truth about Florence.
