= Rika Lesser =

American poet (born 1953)

- Born: 1953 (age 72–73); New York City, U.S.
- Education: Yale University; University of Gothenburg; Columbia University (MFA)
- Occupations: Poet; translator

Rika Lesser (born 1953 in Brooklyn, New York) is an American poet, and is a translator of Swedish and German literary works.

== Life ==
Lesser earned her bachelor's degree at Yale University in 1974. She studied at the University of Gothenburg in Sweden from 1974 to 1975 and received her MFA from Columbia University in 1977. She has produced four collections of her own poetry, including Etruscan Things (1983), and her prose translations include A Living Soul by P. C. Jersild and Siddhartha by Hermann Hesse.

== Awards ==
In 1982, she was awarded the Landon Poetry Translation Prize from the Academy of American Poets, and received the Poetry Translation Prize of the Swedish Academy in 1996 and in 2003.

== Works ==
=== Poetry ===
- Growing back: poems, 1972-1992. University of South Carolina Press. 1997. ISBN 978-1-57003-233-2.
- All we need of hell: poems. University of North Texas Press. 1995. ISBN 978-0-929398-92-1.
- Etruscan things: poems. G. Braziller. 1983. ISBN 978-0-8076-1058-9.
- Questions of Love: New and Selected Poems. Sheep Meadow Press. 2008. ISBN 978-1-9313-5760-9.

=== Translations ===
- Gunnar Ekelöf (1980). Guide to the Underworld. Translator Rika Lesser. University of Massachusetts Press. ISBN 978-0-87023-306-7.
- Hansel and Gretel (1984) (Illustrated by Paul O. Zelinsky)
- Rainer Maria Rilke (1986). Between Roots-selected Poems Rendered from German. Translator Rika Lesser. s.n.
- Sigrid Heuck (1988). The Hideout / Sigrid Heuck. Translator Rika Lesser. Douglas & McIntyre, Limited. ISBN 978-0-88833-266-0.
- Sonnevi, Goran (February 22, 1993). A Child Is Not a Knife: Selected Poems of Goran Sonnevi. tr. & ed.: Lesser, Rika. Princeton University Press. ISBN 978-0-691-01543-9.
