= Grace Hallock =

American writer

Grace Taber Hallock
- Born: Grace Taber Hallock; April 10, 1893; Milton, New York
- Died: August 17, 1967 (aged 74); Newburgh, New York
- Occupation: Writer
- Writing career
- Period: 1922–1950s
- Genres: Children's novels, health education

Grace Taber Hallock (April 10, 1893 – August 17, 1967) was an American children's writer of the early to mid-20th century. Many of her books explained health and science issues, including Florence Nightingale and the Founding of Professional Nursing and Marie Curie (both published by the Metropolitan Life Insurance Co. as part of a series called Health Heroes).

She was born in 1893 on the farm that belonged to her parents, Robert W. Hallock and Isabel Taber Hallock. She lived there her whole life, as well as in New York City for several years. She graduated from Mount Holyoke College in 1914 and afterward helped organize the suffragette organization in Ulster County, New York.

== Newbery Award ==
Hallock was recognized with a Newbery Honor in 1929 for The Boy Who Was, published in 1928 by E. P. Dutton.
