= Emily Jenkins =

Emily Jenkins may refer to:

- Emily Jenkins (children's writer) (born 1967), American writer of children's books with the pen name E. Lockhart
- Emily Jenkins (playwright), British playwright, theatre director and Shakespeare text practitioner
