= Julia Davis Adams =

American writer best known for popular history and historical novels

- Born: July 23, 1900; Clarksburg, West Virginia, U.S.
- Died: January 30, 1993 (aged 92); Ranson, West Virginia
- Occupation: Writer
- Writing career
- Pen name: F. Draco
- Genres: Children's historical novels; mystery fiction (as Draco)
- Notable works: Vaino, A Boy of New Finland; Mountains are Free

Julia Davis Adams (July 23, 1900 – January 30, 1993) was an American writer best known for her young adult books, historical and biographical novels and dramas.

Adams was born in Clarksburg, West Virginia, to lawyer and statesman John W. Davis and Julia Leavell McDonald Davis. She attended Wellesley College, and graduated from Barnard College in 1922. She was also an active social worker and a journalist. She relocated to Charles Town, West Virginia, in 1986.

== Selected works ==
- The Swords of the Vikings: Stories from the Works of Saxo Grammaticus (E. P. Dutton, 1928), retold by Davis
- Vaino, A Boy of New Finland (1929)
- Mountains Are Free (1930)
- No Other White Men (Dutton, 1937)
- The Shenandoah (Rivers of America, 1945); reprint 2011 West Virginia University Press ISBN 9781933202969
- Cloud On The Land, (Rinehart & Company, Inc. 1951)
- A Valley and a Song: The Story of the Shenandoah River (Holt, Rinehart and Winston, 1963)
- Harvest: Collected Works of Julia Davis (Jefferson County Oral and Visual History Association, 1992)

Davis wrote two Murray Hill mystery novels, published as by F. Draco:

- Devil's Church (Rinehart, 1951), LCCN 51-10854
- Cruise with Death (Rinehart, 1952), LCCN 52-7157
