= Mountains Are Free =

1930 novel by Julia Davis Adams

Mountain Are Free
- Author: Julia Davis Adams
- Illustrator: Theodore Nadejen
- Language: English
- Genre: Children's literature / Historical fiction
- Publisher: Dutton
- Publication date: 1930
- Publication place: United States

Mountains Are Free is a 1930 children's historical fiction novel written by Julia Davis Adams and illustrated by Theodore Nadejen. Set in 14th century Switzerland, it retells the legend of William Tell and the Swiss struggle against the Habsburgs from the viewpoint of orphan boy Bruno, Tell's charge. The novel was a Newbery Honor recipient in 1931.
