= Barnard Hughes =

American actor (1915–2006)

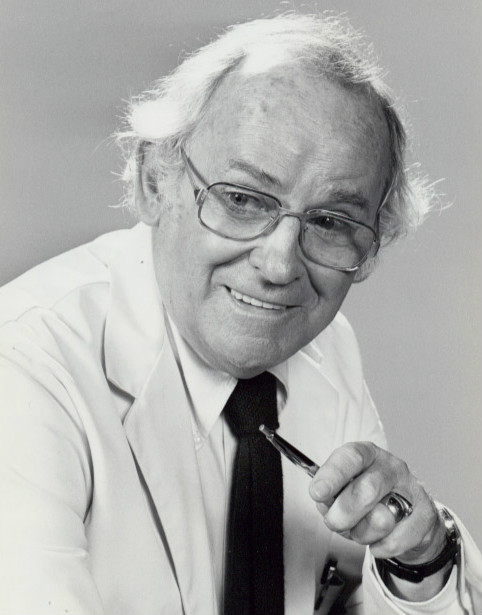
- Hughes in Doc (1975)
- Born: Bernard Aloysius Kiernan Hughes; July 16, 1915; Bedford Hills, New York, U.S.
- Died: July 11, 2006 (aged 90); New York City, U.S.
- Occupation: Actor
- Years active: 1939–2000
- Spouse: Helen Stenborg (m. 1950)
- Children: 2, including Douglas

Bernard Aloysius Kiernan Hughes (July 16, 1915 – July 11, 2006) was an American actor. His most successful roles came after middle age, and he was often cast as a dithering authority figure or grandfatherly elder. He won the 1978 Tony Award for Best Leading Actor in a Play.

== Life and career ==
=== Early years ===
Bernard Aloysius Kiernan Hughes was born in Bedford Hills, New York, on July 16, 1915, the son of Irish immigrants Marcella (née Kiernan) and Owen Hughes. He attended La Salle Academy and Manhattan College in New York City, during which time he worked a series of odd jobs, including a stint as a dockworker and as a salesman at Macy's. He joined the U.S. Army during World War II.

=== Career ===
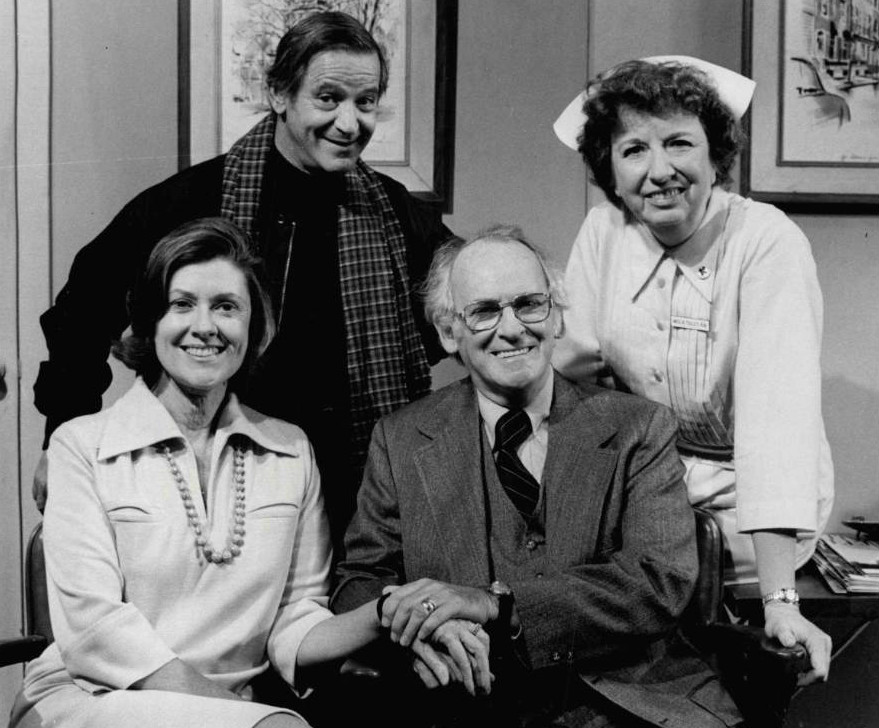
Hughes (seated in front) with the cast of Doc in 1975

Hughes, as he revealed on The Dick Cavett Show, was inspired to become an actor after seeing English actor Dennis King's Broadway run as Richard II in the play Richard of Bordeaux. He asked for his first name to be spelled "Barnard" instead of "Bernard" in his professional credits after a numerologist told him it would help his acting career. He auditioned for New York's Shakespeare Fellowship repertory company on the advice of a friend, and performed with them for two years.

Hughes had over 400 stage roles. He won the 1978 Tony Award for Best Leading Actor in a Play for his performance as the title character in Hugh Leonard's Da. In 1988, he reprised the role for the film adaptation Da. He appeared in the film adaptation of Hamlet (1964) and in such films as Midnight Cowboy (1969), Where's Poppa? (1970), Cold Turkey (1971) The Hospital (1971), Tron (1982), Maxie (1985), The Lost Boys (1987), Doc Hollywood (1991), and Sister Act 2: Back in the Habit (1993). He also played the old man who gave a ride to Felix and Oscar in The Odd Couple II (1998) and was featured in The Fantasticks (1995).

Hughes appeared on TV in such series as Naked City, The Secret Storm, Dark Shadows, Love Story, Blossom, and Homicide: Life on the Street. In 1973, he had a notable recurring role on All in the Family as a Roman Catholic priest, Father John Majeski, doing battle with Archie Bunker, and won an Emmy for his portrayal of a senile judge on Lou Grant. Hughes made three appearances in The Bob Newhart Show as the father of Dr. Robert Hartley. He was the central character in three sitcoms: Doc, in which he played a physician; Mr. Merlin, in which he played Merlin, a magician mentoring a 20th-century teenager; and The Cavanaughs, co-starring Christine Ebersole, in which he played the family patriarch (Art Carney played his brother, and Glynis Johns made guest appearances). Hughes sang "Danny Boy" in one episode of the latter series. He also made a memorable appearance as The King (with Jim Dale as The Duke) in the PBS mini-series Adventures of Huckleberry Finn.

Hughes also made recurring appearances on daytime dramas including Guiding Light, The Secret Storm and As the World Turns as well as a brief appearance as a private investigator in an early episode of Dark Shadows. He also did many voice-overs for various television commercials including Kix cereal.

=== Personal life and death ===
Hughes married actress Helen Stenborg on April 19, 1950, and they remained married until his death in July 2006. They had a son named Doug, who became a theater director, and a daughter.

Hughes died of natural causes in New York City on July 11, 2006, aged 90. He is interred at the Episcopal Church of the Transfiguration in Manhattan, where his wife Helen was also interred after her death in 2011.

Hughes was an Episcopalian and served as president of the Episcopal Actors Guild from 1986 to 2002.

== Acting credits ==
=== Selected filmography ===
Year	Title	Role	Notes
1954	Playgirl	Durkin	Uncredited
1961	The Young Doctors	Dr. Kent O'Donnell	
1964	Hamlet	Marcellus / Priest	
1966	Dark Shadows	Stuart Bronson	Gothic Soap Opera
1967	The Borgia Stick	Doctor Helm	TV movie
1969	Midnight Cowboy	Towny	
1970	Where's Poppa?	Colonel Warren J. Hendricks	
1971	Dr. Cook's Garden	Elias Hart	TV movie
1971	Cold Turkey	Dr. Proctor	
1971	The Pursuit of Happiness	Judge Vogel	
1971	The Hospital	Edmund Drummond	Also made an uncredited appearance as Dr. Mallory
1971	All in the Family	Father Majeski	TV series
1972	Rage	Dr. Spencer	
1972	Deadhead Miles	Old Man	Uncredited
1973	Sisters	Arthur McLennen	
1975	Doc	Dr. Joe "Doc" Bogert	TV series
1975	The UFO Incident	Dr. Benjamin Simon	TV movie
1977	Hawaii Five-O	Clinton Palmer	TV series
1977	Oh, God!	Judge Baker	
1979	Sanctuary of Fear	Father Brown	TV movie, pilot for unmade series with Kay Lenz
1981	First Monday in October	Chief Justice James Jefferson Crawford	
1981	Mr. Merlin	Merlin	TV series
1982	Tron	Dr. Walter Gibbs/Dumont	
1982	Best Friends	Tim McCullen	
1985	Maxie	Bishop Campbell	
1986	Where Are the Children?	Jonathan Knowles	
1987	The Lost Boys	Grandpa	
1987	A Hobo's Christmas	Chance Grover	
1988	Da	Nick Tynan	
1989	Day One	Secretary of War Henry Stimson	
1991	Doc Hollywood	Aurelius Edsel Hogue, M.D.	
1991–1994	Blossom	Buzz Richman	TV series, 52 episodes
1993	Sister Act 2: Back in the Habit	Father Maurice	
1994	Trick of the Eye	Harry Pitt	TV movie
1995	The Fantasticks	Henry Albertson	
1998	The Odd Couple II	Beaumont	
1999	Cradle Will Rock	Frank Marvel	

=== Stage productions ===
- "Osgood Meeker" in the Broadway production of Noël Coward's Waiting in the Wings, directed by Michael Langham (this was Barnard Hughes' last stage role)
- "Old Man" in the Broadway production of Prelude to a Kiss, directed by Norman René
- Polonius to Stacy Keach's Hamlet
- Marcellus in Richard Burton's 1964 Hamlet
- Dogberry in the New York Shakespeare Festival production of Much Ado About Nothing
- Harry Hope in the 1985 Broadway revival of The Iceman Cometh directed by José Quintero
- Uncle Vanya (directed by Mike Nichols)
- A Doll's House
- Hogan's Goat (Off-Broadway)
- Three Sisters
- The Devil's Disciple
- Translations
- "Lynn Belvedere" in the Tenthouse Theatre in the Round production of Gwen Davenport's "Belvedere" August 9–14, 1948.
