= Sally Lucas Jean =

American health educator and nurse

- Born: June 18, 1878; Towson, Maryland, U.S.
- Died: June 5, 1971 (aged 92); New York, New York, U.S.

Sally Lucas Jean (June 18, 1878 – July 5, 1971) was an American health educator and nurse.

== Biography ==
Sally Lucas Jean was born June 18, 1878, the youngest child of three to George and Emilie Watkins (née Selby) Jean in Towson, Maryland. Her mother was a southerner while her father had fought for the north in the American Civil War. Her father was a teacher and died when Jean was fifteen. Jean was encouraged to follow him into the teaching profession and she graduated in 1896 from Maryland State Normal School. However Jean had a particular interest. She had played Florence Nightingale in a school play shortly after losing her friend to diphtheria. The events interested her in a nursing career and she went on to graduate from Maryland Homoepathic Training School for Nurses in 1898.

Jean served as an army nurse during the Spanish–American War in Lexington, Kentucky, and Chickamauga, Georgia, her first post. She returned home to work as a private nurse and later a school and playground nurse. Later Jean went on to become a pioneering educator coining the term health education. In 1914 she became the director of Maryland's Social Health Service before going in 1917 to New York to organise a People's Institute Department of Health Service. She then went on to supervise health education for the U.S. Indian Service in 1934 and 1935. As a result of her work during the first World War, when she served on New York Academy of Medicine's Committee on Wartime Problems of Childhood and seeing the impact it had on the population, she was director of the establishment of the Child Health Organization which went on to be the American Child Health Association when it merged with the American Child Hygiene Association in 1923. Jean went on to work as the director of the Health Education department there. She worked as a consultant internationally from 1924 to the 1950s, developing health education programs in China, Japan, Philippines, Virgin Islands and Panama Canal Zone as well as working with companies and for University of Denver summer school in 1942, the Colorado River War Relocation Authority from 1942 to 1943 and the National Foundation for Infantile Paralysis in 1944. In 1951, she was inducted an Associate Fellow in the prestigious National Academy of Kinesiology (formerly American Academy of Physical Education; American Academy of Kinesiology and Physical Education).

Jean lived with her secretary and friend Dorothy Goodwin. Jean died on July 5, 1971. Her papers and publications are part of the Louise Round Wilson Special collection at the University of North Carolina.

Sally Lucas Jean, 1878-1971, health education pioneer was written by Marguerite Vollmer in 1973.
