= The Boy Who Was =

1928 novel by Grace Taber Hallock

- Author: Grace Taber Hallock
- Illustrator: Harrie Wood
- Language: English
- Genre: Historical fantasy
- Publisher: E. P. Dutton & Co
- Publication date: 1928
- Publication place: United States
- Media type: Print
- Pages: 153 pp
- ISBN: 9789997488770
- OCLC: 1898112

The Boy Who Was is a children's historical fantasy novel by Grace Taber Hallock. It tells the story of a human boy blessed with eternal life who participates in the march of history as it moves across the Bay of Naples for 3,000 years. Nino witnesses the destruction of Pompeii, the sack of Rome, the Children's Crusade, and the coming of Garibaldi. The novel, illustrated by Harrie Wood, was first published in 1928 and was a Newbery Honor recipient in 1929.

== Plot ==
In the Prologue, an unnamed artist visiting the town of Sorrento, Italy, encounters a young goatherd named Nino, who agrees to pose for a sketch in return for the artist's help in painting some figurines Nino has carved. These figurines represent historical figures from the past 3,000 years of the area's history, beginning with Odysseus and the Sirens, and ending with Giuseppe Garibaldi.

Chapter 1, "Siren Songs", and chapter 2, "Song of Odysseus", set up the premise of the book: 3,000 years ago, Nino was befriended by a siren who gave him the gift of eternal life and health in thanks for his friendship. The rest of the book consists of stories from various points in history, connected only by Nino's involvement.

Chapter 3, "Poseidon and the Greeks", covers the building of the temple of Poseidon in Paestum.

Chapter 4, "The Romans and the Volcano", tells of the destruction of Pompeii.

Chapter 5, "The Last of the Goths", is a highly romanticized view of the fall of the Ostrogothic kingdom in southern Italy which followed the western Roman empire and was in turn followed by the Lombards.

Chapter 6, "The Normans and the Saracens", has Nino telling Robert Guiscard's army about a group of Norman soldiers sixty years earlier who repelled a Saracen pirate attack on Salerno.

Chapter 7, "The Crusader", is about the Children's Crusade from two viewpoints: that of a minstrel who has heard the tale and retells it at a great feast, and that of the young boy who led the crusade, whom Nino befriends.

Chapter 8, "Students of Salerno", is about John of Procida and his diplomatic and spying work in favor of the Hohenstaufen rulers of southern Italy against Charles of Anjou's French.

Chapter 9, "Redbeard and Saint Andrew", tells about a raid of the Muslim privateer Barbarossa on Amalfi, and how the town was saved by a miraculous storm.

Chapter 10, "The Bandits", tells how Nino arranges for an Italian Prince to be captured by the Carbonari and brought into sympathy with their cause.

The "Epilogue" which follows is a short poem addressed to Nino by the author, which brings the book to a close.
