= The Westing Game =

1978 children's mystery novel by Ellen Raskin

- First edition
- Author: Ellen Raskin
- Cover artist: Ellen Raskin
- Genre: Mystery Fiction
- Publisher: E. P. Dutton
- Publication date: May 1, 1978
- Pages: 216 pg
- ISBN: 0-525-47137-5
- OCLC: 53292898
- LC Class: PZ7.R1817 We 2003

The Westing Game is a mystery book written by Ellen Raskin and published by Dutton on May 1, 1978. It won the Newbery Medal recognizing the year's most distinguished contribution to American children's literature.

The Westing Game was ranked number nine all-time among children's novels in a survey published by School Library Journal in 2012. It has been adapted as the 1997 feature film Get a Clue (also distributed as The Westing Game).

== Plot summary ==
On the Fourth of July, sixteen strangers receive personal invitations to rent apartments in the new Sunset Towers apartment complex, a luxurious property on Lake Michigan adjacent to wealthy businessman Samuel W. Westing's mansion. Westing made his fortune in the paper business and is rumored to be worth $200 million (worth $1.5 billion in 2024). The salesman, Barney Northrup, gives personalized attention to each potential resident, all of whom accept.

In October, residents begin to hear rumors that Samuel Westing has died but that his corpse remains in the mansion. Tabitha-Ruth "Turtle" Wexler, a highly intelligent 13-year-old with a habit of kicking people in the shin if they touch her braid, accepts a dare to enter the presumably empty mansion. She leaves the mansion in terror after finding Westing's body in the bedroom and hearing strange noises, which no one believes. Shortly afterwards, news breaks of Westing's death, and all the residents are invited to a reading of the will. The will claims that Westing was murdered by one of them, but that each is still a named potential heir to his fortune and company. It stipulates that they must work in pairs to solve Westing's puzzle and locate his murderer.

One of the heirs, Josie-Jo Ford, a sitting judge and a former protege of Westing's, is skeptical of the entire scenario. Knowing that Westing loved games and puzzles, especially chess, she discourages the heirs from "playing" believing that Westing was losing his grip on reality in his final days; she argues that there is no proof that Westing was murdered and initially refuses to go along with the rest of the heirs. Her partner, Sandy McSouthers, convinces her to go along with the game because of his financial hardship and that they have to play together to win.

The heirs spend the next several months trying to accumulate clues from rival pairs. In doing so, many form new friendships and make surprising discoveries about each other. Many of the heirs harbored secret lives, including being a bookie, thief, bomber, undercover private investigator, and relative of Sam Westing. Nearing the Fourth of July deadline, Sandy McSouthers collapses from an apparent poisoning, shocking the heirs. The heirs determine that the 'answer' to Westing's puzzle is Berthe Erica Crow, who is actually Westing's ex-wife. Crow admits that the puzzle implicates her, but she protests her innocence alongside her partner, Otis Amber. Judge Ford and Turtle believe her innocence and hold a mock trial to go over the evidence. During the proceedings, Turtle solves the real puzzle of the Westing game and confronts the chairman of the board, Julian Eastman. Turtle realizes that Westing, Northrup, McSouthers, and Eastman are all the same person using various disguises; Westing created the "McSouthers" identity to replace "Westing", making Sandy the "murderer" and thereby winning the Westing game.

In the epilogues, "Eastman" spends the next decade mentoring Turtle in business and chess while funding her education in preparation for her taking over the company. The remaining heirs remain close, starting new business ventures, marriages, and families together. When Westing is on his deathbed, Turtle consoles him that the heirs loved their friend "Sandy" and that his game was ultimately a success. Choosing to keep the secret, Turtle continues his legacy by beginning to mentor her niece in chess.

== Characters ==
=== Pair one ===
- Jake Wexler is a podiatrist, and a bookie on the side. He is married to Grace Wexler and is the father of Angela and Turtle Wexler.
- Madame Sun Lin Hoo is the second and much younger Chinese immigrant wife of James Shin Hoo. She barely knows how to speak English. She can usually be found cooking in her husband's restaurant.

=== Pair two ===
- Tabitha-Ruth (Alice) "Turtle" (T.R.) Wexler is an intelligent 13-year-old girl. She is very protective of her long, dark braid of hair and anyone who touches it gets a kick to the shin and a bruise. She also has a crush on Doug Hoo.
- Flora Baumbach is a shy 60-year-old dressmaker who becomes a maternal figure to Turtle. During the Westing Game, she becomes more than a mother to Turtle, allowing her to call her "Baba."

=== Pair three ===
- Christos "Chris" Theodorakis is a 15-year-old boy who uses a wheelchair due to degenerative muscle disease. He is intelligent and enjoys birdwatching.
- Dr. Denton Deere is a medical intern, engaged to Angela. To show off, he diagnoses everyone he meets.

=== Pair four ===
- Judge J.J. (Josie-Jo) Ford is an intelligent and serious black woman in her forties. She is suspicious of the game created by Sam Westing and believes that one of the heirs may be in danger.
- Alexander "Sandy" McSouthers is the doorman at the Sunset Towers Apartments. He has a very big family, and he got fired from the Westing Paper Plant.

=== Pair five ===
- Grace Windsor Wexler, married to Jake Wexler and mother of Angela and Turtle.
- James Shin Hoo is a former entrepreneur, the owner of the Hoo's restaurant chain with Madame Sun Lin Hoo.

=== Pair six ===
- Berthe Erica Crow, usually referred to as simply Crow, is the cleaning woman for Sunset Towers. She is extremely religious and also operates a downtown soup kitchen.
- Otis Amber is a 62-year-old "delivery boy" who assists Crow with her soup kitchen on the side.

=== Pair seven ===
- Theo Theodorakis is a smart high school student, and very loyal to his family. He is protective of his brother Chris and works hard in his parents' coffee shop. He is interested in becoming a writer, and also becomes friends with his partner, Doug Hoo.
- Doug Hoo, son of James Shin Hoo, is a high school track star, one of the best mile-runners in the state. Running is his passion, but his father often criticizes him for not studying enough. He is a prankster and develops a rivalry with Turtle Wexler, who has a crush on him.

=== Pair eight ===
- Angela Wexler is a twenty-year-old girl: fair, blonde, and very pretty. She is considered the 'perfect' daughter, often getting more attention than her sister Turtle.
- Sydelle Pulaski is a mysterious character who seems to have no connection to Mr. Westing or the other heirs.

== Other media ==
The Westing Game was adapted into a 2009 stage play of the same name by Darian Lindle. It was directed by Terry Brino-Dean and produced at Prime Stage Theatre in Pittsburgh. The script is published by Dramatic Publishing.

The book was also adapted as the 1997 television movie Get a Clue, written by Dylan Kelsey Hadley and directed by Terence H. Winkless.

On September 9, 2020, HBO Max placed a script-to-series order based on the book.

== Reception ==
At the time of the book's publication, Kirkus Reviews called it "A supersharp mystery, more a puzzle than a novel, but endowed with a vivid and extensive cast... If Raskin's crazy ingenuity has threatened to run away with her on previous occasions, here the complicated game is always perfectly meshed with character and story. Confoundingly clever, and very funny." In a retrospective essay about the Newbery Medal-winning books from 1976 to 1985, literary critic Zena Sutherland wrote of The Westing Game, "Still a popular book with the group of readers who are mystery or puzzle fans, in retrospect this seems more entertaining than distinguished. Its choice as a Medal book underscores the problematic question: Can a distinguished book also be a popular book?"

== Unfinished sequel ==
Publishers Weekly revealed that Ellen Raskin's estate had two unfinished works in manuscript form, an entirely new novel titled A Murder for Macaroni and Cheese and a sequel to The Westing Game. No plot details, titles, or excerpts have been released from the sequel.

Awards
Preceded by Bridge to Terabithia	Newbery Medal recipient 1979	Succeeded by A Gathering of Days: A New England Girl's Journal
