= Ellen Raskin =

American writer and illustrator (1928–1984)

- Born: March 13, 1928; Milwaukee, Wisconsin, U.S.
- Died: August 8, 1984 (aged 56); New York, New York
- Education: University of Wisconsin
- Occupations: Writer, illustrator
- Spouses: Roy Kuhlman (m. 1957; div. 1958-1960); Dennis Flanagan (m. 1960, second husband)
- Children: Susan Kuhlman Metcalfe
- Parents: Solomon Raskin; Margaret (Goldfisch) Raskin
- Writing career
- Genres: Children's novels, picture books
- Notable works: The Mysterious Disappearance of Leon (I Mean Noel); Figgs & Phantoms; The Tattooed Potato and Other Clues; The Westing Game
- Notable awards: Newbery Medal; 1979 The Westing Game

Ellen Raskin (March 13, 1928 – August 8, 1984) was an American children's writer and illustrator. She won the 1979 Newbery Medal for The Westing Game, a mystery novel, and another children's mystery, Figgs & Phantoms, was a Newbery Honor Book in 1975.

In 2012 The Westing Game was ranked number nine all-time among children's novels in a survey published by School Library Journal, a monthly with a primarily-U.S. audience.

== Life ==
Raskin was born in Milwaukee, where she grew up during the Great Depression. She was educated at the University of Wisconsin with a major in fine art.

Raskin was an accomplished graphic artist. She worked in New York City as a commercial artist for about 15 years. Among other things, she designed more than 1000 dust jackets for books, including the first edition of Madeleine L'Engle's A Wrinkle in Time, the 1963 Newbery Medal winner.

In 1957, she married graphic designer Roy Kuhlman, but they soon divorced. In 1960 she married Dennis Flanagan, editor of Scientific American.

Raskin died at the age of 56 on August 8, 1984, in New York City, as a result of a connective-tissue disease.

== Education ==
At the age of 17, Raskin entered the University of Wisconsin with the intention of majoring in journalism. However, after visiting an art exhibit at the Art Institute of Chicago, she changed her major to fine arts.

== Works ==
=== Children's picture books ===
Raskin wrote and illustrated twelve picture books, published by Atheneum Books except as noted.

- Nothing Ever Happens on My Block, 1967
- Silly Songs and Sad, Thomas Y. Crowell Co., 1967
- Spectacles, 1968
- Ghost in a Four-Room Apartment, 1969
- And It Rained, 1969
- A & The, or, William T. C. Baumgarten Comes to Town, 1970
- The World's Greatest Freak Show, 1971
- Franklin Stein, 1972
- Moe Q. McGlutch, He Smoked Too Much, Parents, 1973
- Who, Said Sue, Said Whoo?, 1973
- Moose, Goose & Little Nobody, 1976
- Twenty-Two, Twenty-Three, 1976

=== Children’s novels ===
Raskin wrote four novels, all published by E. P. Dutton.

- The Mysterious Disappearance of Leon (I Mean Noel), 1971
- Figgs & Phantoms, 1974
- The Tattooed Potato and Other Clues, 1975
- The Westing Game, 1978

=== As illustrator ===
Raskin also illustrated more than twenty books by other writers.

- Happy Christmas: Tales for Boys and Girls, edited by Claire H. Bishop, Ungar, 1956.
- The Bound Man and Other Stories, by Ilse Aichinger, transl. by Eric Mosbacher, New York: Noonday Press, 1956.
- A Child's Christmas in Wales, by Dylan Thomas (1950); J. M. Dent, 1968.
- Mama, I Wish I Was Snow, Child You'd Be Very Cold, by Ruth Krauss, Atheneum, 1962.
- Philosophy and History. The Ernst Cassirer Festschrift, ed. Raymond Klibansky and H. J. Paton, 1963. (second edition)
- Poems of Edgar Allan Poe, selected by Dwight MacDonald, Crowell, 1965.
- We Dickinson's, by Aileen Fisher and Olive Rabe, Atheneum, 1965.
- The Jewish Sabbath, by Molly Cone, Crowell, 1966.
- Paths of Poetry: Twenty-Five Poets and Their Poems, ed. Louis Untermeyer, Delacorte, 1966.
- Songs of Innocence (Volumes 1 & 2), by William Blake (1789, 1794), music and illustrations by Ellen Raskin, Doubleday, 1966.
- D. H. Lawrence: Poems Selected for Young People, ed. William Cole, Viking, 1967.
- Ellen Grae, by Vera and Bill Cleaver, Lippincott, 1967.
- Poems of Robert Herrick, ed. Winfield T. Scott, Crowell, 1967.
- Probability: The Science of Chance, by Arthur G. Razzell and K. G. O. Watts, Doubleday, 1967. ‡
- This Is 4: the Idea of a Number, by Razzell and Watts, Doubleday, 1967. ‡
- Books: A Book to Begin On, by Susan Bartlett, Holt, 1968.
- Inatuk's Friend, by Suzanne Stark Morrow, Atlantic/Little, 1968.
- A Paper Zoo: A Collection of Animal Poems by Modern American Poets, edited by Renee K. Weiss, Macmillan, 1968.
- Piping Down the Valleys Wild: Poetry for the Young of All Ages, edited by Nancy Larrick, Delacorte, 1968.
- Symmetry, by Razzell and Watts, Doubleday, 1968. ‡
- We Alcotts, by Aileen Fisher and Olive Rabe, Atheneum, 1968.
- Circles and Curves, by Razzell and Watts, Doubleday, 1969. ‡
- Come Along!, by Rebecca Caudill, Holt, 1969.
- Shrieks at Midnight: Macabre Poems, Eerie and Humorous, edited by Sara and John E. Brewton, Crowell, 1969.
- Three and the Shape of Three, by Razzell and Watts, Doubleday, 1969. ‡
- Elidor, by Alan Garner (1965), Walck, 1970.
- Goblin Market, by Christina Rossetti (1862), Dutton, 1970.

‡ Raskin illustrated at least five volumes in a series of 32- and 48-page mathematics books by Arthur C. Razzell and Kenneth George Oliver Watts, which was inaugurated by Doubleday in 1964.
