= Steve Carver =

American film director (1945–2021)

- Born: April 5, 1945; New York City, New York, U.S.
- Died: January 8, 2021 (aged 75); Los Angeles, California, U.S.
- Education: Cornell University (BA); Washington University (MFA); American Film Institute (MFA)
- Occupations: Film director; producer; photographer
- Years active: 1970–1996 (as filmmaker)

Steve Carver (April 5, 1945 – January 8, 2021) was an American film director, producer, and photographer.

== Biography ==
Carver attended Manhattan's High School of Music and Art and received his BA from Cornell University and his MFA from the Sam Fox School of Design & Visual Arts at Washington University in St. Louis. He was originally interested in cartooning, commercial art and animation. He was a cameraman for the Wide World of Sports, for the St. Louis Cardinals, and made 30 documentaries in two years while teaching in St Louis area colleges.

=== American Film Institute ===
In 1970, a documentary he shot in grad school got him admitted to the American Film Institute, then in its second year of taking in fellows in Hollywood. While at the AFI he studied under such filmmakers as George Stevens, George Seaton, Alfred Hitchcock, Charlton Heston and Gregory Peck. He worked as an assistant director on Dalton Trumbo's sole effort as director, Johnny Got His Gun (1971).

Carver's final AFI project was a short film based on Edgar Allan Poe's The Tell-Tale Heart starring Alex Cord and Sam Jaffe. The Los Angeles Times described it as "an effective mood piece, a beautiful work in ominous life and shadow".

"I loved AFI", said Carver. "It was an opportunity to use some very talented people."

=== Roger Corman ===
The Tell-Tale Heart was widely screened and attracted the attention of Roger Corman who had made a number of adaptations of Poe's works. Corman hired Carver to work at New World Pictures.

Carver spent his first year at New World cutting trailers. He later estimated he cut 100-150 trailers in that time. He also wrote a number of scripts for Corman, including one on Admiral Byrd that floundered when they could not secure rights from Byrd's estate. He was working on a script about a black female private eye when Corman gave him the chance to direct with The Arena (1974), a film about female gladiators shot in Italy.

=== Big Bad Mama and Capone ===
Corman was pleased with The Arena and gave Carver another directing job, a gangster film starring Angie Dickinson, Big Bad Mama (1974). Paul Bartel, who directed second unit on the film, described Carver as "very well organised" and "having great control of the medium". It was a big success at the box office.

Corman used Carver on another gangster film he made over at 20th Century Fox, Capone (1975), starring Ben Gazzara and John Cassavetes.

In a 1975 interview Carver said "All I want to do for now is a string of good commercial pictures but in my own style. I'm not looking for a multi-million-dollar picture; $1 to $2 million will do for now." The same interview described him "as intense and dynamic as his films... an aggressive achiever who has already accomplished enough for three people."

=== Drum ===
Carver was mentioned as a possible director for the third film in the "Billy Jack" series, Billy Jack Goes to Washington, but in the end Tom Laughlin decided to do it. Instead Dino De Laurentiis hired Carver to replace Burt Kennedy as director on Drum (1976). Although the movie was completed successfully and proved profitable, Carver described the experience of taking over another director as "horrible". In a later interview Carver described Burt Kennedy's attitude towards him as "very gracious": "He sat down with me, explained the situation. He warned me that part of the cast would follow him off of the movie. He went over a lot with me."

Carver was going to make a film for Ray Stark with Susan Blakely, Freestyle, about a hotdog skier at the end of her career. However it was never made. Neither was another film Carver was attached to, Summer Camp from a script by Barry Schneider. Instead Carver directed Steel with Lee Majors, then made another for Roger Corman, Fast Charlie... the Moonbeam Rider (1979), starring David Carradine.

He did some uncredited work on a TV movie, Angel City (1980). Carver left the production, because the producers refused to fire actor Ralph Waite, who, according to Carver, came to the set drunk.

=== Chuck Norris ===
Carver made two highly successful films with Chuck Norris, An Eye for an Eye and Lone Wolf McQuade.

The development of Walker, Texas Ranger led to a lawsuit filed by Carver and his production partner Yoram Ben-Ami, which they lost. Carver in 2020: "We failed to convince the Supreme Court that there were similarities. Now, you and I and anybody else knows that there are similarities between Lone Wolf McQuade and Walker, Texas Ranger."

=== Later career ===
His late-'80s movies tended to be less distinguished – Oceans of Fire (1986), a TV movie; Jocks (1987), a teen comedy with a young Mariska Hargitay; Bulletproof (1988), an action film with Gary Busey; River of Death (1989); Dead Center (1993); The Wolves (1996). He also directed a number of movies uncredited. As he explained in an interview from August 2020: "I became known as a “go-to” director with other producers. When a movie got in trouble and a producer needed a director to step in to “save” their picture, they called me. It was fun for a while and good money."

Eventually Carver left directing and went into photography. "Roger spoiled me", Carver reflected later, saying other producers "wore me down and chased me back to doing photography." He opened a photography lab in Los Angeles in 1995.

He is featured in the documentary film That Guy Dick Miller, over the acting and life of Dick Miller.

== Death ==
Carver died from COVID-19 in Los Angeles on January 8, 2021, at age 75, during the COVID-19 pandemic in California, though it was initially reported that he died from a heart attack.

== Films ==
- The Tell-Tale Heart (1971) (short) – director, producer
- Johnny Got His Gun (1971) – assistant director
- The Arena (1974) – director
- Big Bad Mama (1974) – director
- Capone (1975) - director
- Drum (1976) – director
- Fast Charlie... the Moonbeam Rider (1979) – director
- Steel (1979) – director
- Angel City (1980) (TV movie) – director (uncredited)
- An Eye for an Eye (1981) – director
- Lone Wolf McQuade (1983) – director, producer
- Oceans of Fire (1986) (TV movie) – director
- Jocks (1987) – director
- Bulletproof (1988) – director
- River of Death (1989) – director
- Dead Center (1993) – director
- The Wolves (1996) – director
