= Deathsport =

1978 film directed by Allan Arkush and Nicholas Niciphor

- Theatrical release poster
- Directed by: Allan Arkush; Nicholas Niciphor
- Written by: Nicholas Niciphor; Donald E. Stewart
- Story by: Frances Doel
- Produced by: Roger Corman
- Starring: David Carradine; Claudia Jennings; Richard Lynch
- Cinematography: Gary Graver
- Edited by: Larry Bock
- Music by: Andy Stein
- Distributed by: New World Pictures
- Release date: April 12, 1978
- Running time: 82 minutes
- Country: United States
- Language: English
- Budget: $150,000
- Box office: $400,000

Deathsport is a 1978 science fiction action sports B-film produced by Roger Corman and directed by Allan Arkush and Nicholas Niciphor. The film stars David Carradine and Playboy Playmate Claudia Jennings. It was one of Jennings's last films before her death.

== Plot ==
"A thousand years from tomorrow" after the Neutron Wars, the world is divided into a barbaric collection of city states surrounded by wastelands where only mutant cannibals and independent warriors, known as Range Guides, can live. Led by Lord Zirpola, the city state of Helix is planning war on another city state, Tritan, for their fuel supply. Hoping to prove the superiority of their newest weapons, the Death Machines (laser-equipped dirt bikes), they create a new pastime – Deathsport.

The death penalty has been replaced by Deathsport, where criminals battle each other to the death in return for gaining their freedom. Lord Zirpola has managed to capture legendary Range Guide Kaz Oshay and he wants to add a female Range Guide for an upcoming Deathsport event. A female Range Guide, Deneer, is captured while leading a group of Tritans across the desert. A child, Tara, is taken by the mutant group during the attack to capture Deneer. In a Helix jail, Kaz Oshay bonds with Deneer and vows to escape with her and find the group's child.

After enduring torture and facing his mother's killer, Ankar Moor, Oshay and Deneer are forced onto the Deathsport motocross field, which is mined with explosives. They easily defeat the other riders and escape from Helix with two other prisoners, Dr. Karl and his son Marcus. During the escape, though, the doctor is killed.

Eventually, they rescue Tara from the mutant cannibals and battle the other Death Machine riders who followed them. Finally safe, Deneer delivers Marcus to Tritan, while Oshay faces Ankar Moor in "honorable" combat, using Whistlers (swords that make a sound like music). After a bloody battle, Oshay decapitates Ankar Moor, thus becoming the greatest Range Guide alive. The film ends with Oshay, Deneer and Tara riding their horses off into the sunset.

== Cast ==
- David Carradine as Kaz Oshay
- Claudia Jennings as Deneer
- Richard Lynch as Ankar Moor
- William Smithers as Dr. Karl
- Will Walker as Marcus Karl
- David McLean as Lord Zirpola
- Jesse Vint as Polna
- H. B. Haggerty as jailer
- Peter Hooper as Mr. Bakkar
- Brenda Venus as Adriann

== Production ==
=== Development ===
The film was intended as a follow-up to Death Race 2000 (1975), only with motorcycles instead of cars. Corman had a commitment with David Carradine to have him as a star under a five-picture contract that he had signed with the actor, and had gotten Charles B. Griffith to write a script. However, Corman was unhappy with the script.

Allan Arkush, who worked at New World at the time, recalled Corman "offered it [the film] to everybody and nobody wanted to do it, because it was really half-baked and Death Race 2000 was a really good movie." Nicholas Niciphor, a recent graduate of USC, was given the job of rewriting and directing the film. Niciphor got the job on the recommendation of Joe Roth, who admired Niciphor's short films. Niciphor said that he had less than two weeks to write and pre-produce the film. He also said that Carradine was reluctant to do the film, as he was making more prestigious films at the time, and would only be available for 21 days.

In an interview from 2005, David Carradine said that Corman had advised him not to do Deathsport: "He was right too. I knew it the moment I saw the picture. He warned me and I didn't listen. He was determined not to pay anybody, except me. He didn't want to put any money into it. He paid me what I was worth back then – this was right after the Ingmar Bergman picture – and that was pretty much the whole budget of the movie."

Gary Graver was hired to shoot the movie and he lobbied for Claudia Jennings to be the female lead.

=== Shooting ===
Many locations around the Los Angeles area were used, including the famous Vasquez Rocks and Bronson Caves, both of which have appeared in many films and television episodes.

Shooting was problematic. Niciphor said that it became "hell" from the third day of shooting. "The script was too ambitious, the shooting schedule too tight and...the crew and the cast were largely sodden with drugs." The director claimed that Carradine was very open with his drug use and that Claudia Jennings had both a drinking problem and a cocaine problem. The film fell behind schedule and Corman threatened to replace Niciphor with Allan Arkush. Arkush said Niciphor "didn't shoot the action scenes, he had problems with screen direction...It was a frustrating experience for him, and he didn't get along with the actors on top of it.” Graver said the director "was just paranoid and crazy and nervous and everything. We all tried to help him, really. He couldn't hack it. Some people shouldn't be on film sets. He was mean to Claudia.”

In a 1990 letter to Psychotronic Video magazine (Psychotronic Video #7), David Carradine described writer and director Nicholas Niciphor as "a very talented and crazy guy. As a director he was erratic and unknowing...The picture, which was brilliantly written, was unable to overcome the madness of the shoot". Carradine said Niciphor's "direction seemed to me to mainly consist of hysteria and episodic tantrums." Specifically he claimed that, on one occasion, Niciphor "physically attacked" Claudia Jennings and that Carradine "beat up" Niciphor in response.

Niciphor countered these claims in a 1991 letter to Psychotronic Video magazine (Psychotronic Video #9) where he claimed that he and two stuntmen had physically removed Jennings from a motorcycle when Niciphor realized that she was drunk and apparently high on cocaine (Jennings had a well-known cocaine addiction in the late 1970s). He said that Carradine was not there during this exchange, but admitted that the actor did assault him on several occasions, one of which resulted in Carradine breaking Niciphor's nose and led to the director winding up in the hospital. Corman insisted that Niciphor return to shooting, or he would be replaced with Arkush. Niciphor went back to the set and completed the movie, in time for Carradine to leave and go film Circle of Iron (1978).

Carradine wrote in his memoirs that, when the time came to shoot a sex scene between Carradine and Jennings, Niciphor told Carradine that he had not been with a woman in six months and could not be in a room with a naked Jennings and asked Carradine to direct it.

Jesse Vint says he started a romantic relationship with Jennings on the film. He says he got along with Niciphor "but in his discussions, his mind kept going back to Vietnam. He would talk about the most grisly and gruesome things imaginable, and I could see that he was carrying a lot of baggage around with him." Vint claims the director had trouble relating with people and that "Claudia was a trooper. She would do anything." According to Vint, one day Niciphor was screaming at Jennings and "By the time I got there. David Carradine had done one of his karate kicks and sent Nick flying through the air." Niciphor left the film.

=== Reshoots ===
Several weeks later Corman asked Niciphor to return to shoot some additional scenes. Niciphor says that he refused because he did not want to work with Carradine again. Carradine claimed that it was because the scenes involved filming explosions and Niciphor had PTSD from his experiences as a soldier in the Vietnam War. Nicophor denies this, however, and says that it was just about Carradine.

Allan Arkush was called in to complete the film, recutting it and adding new scenes. Arkush later claimed that:

Mostly we just blew up motorcycles. Lots of them. We also set some mutants on fire. And the stunning Claudia Jennings got naked. David Carradine...smoked a lot of high-grade weed and helped us to blow stuff up...Sad to say, I couldn't save the picture.

Arkush added that Jennings did have a cocaine problem and "at times she was definitely a little 'glazed over' on the set."

Carradine said that one of the additional scenes shot was of Jennings being tortured while naked. He said that Corman asked for this, as the producer felt that there was insufficient nudity.

== Release ==
The film was not as successful at the box office as Death Race 2000, and a proposed second follow-up film, Deathworld, was announced but never made.

Carradine called the film "terrible" and claimed that "my career never really fully recovered from that blunder." He repeated this sentiment in an interview in 2005, saying: "I didn't need to do a bad picture at the time, because I was on a good roll. I don't think my career ever quite recovered from that."

On August 3, 2010, Shout! Factory released Deathsport, along with the 1982 film Battletruck, on a double-feature Collector's Edition DVD.

== In popular culture ==
On February 9, 2026, Deathsport was announced as one of the first of four episodes on the Rifftrax-produced episodes of Mystery Science Theater 3000 and was released October 23, 2026.

== Soundtrack ==
The film was scored by Andy Stein and featured guitar riffs from Jerry Garcia.

== Bibliography ==
- Bass, Ari (July 21, 2000). "Claudia Jennings: Lost Highway". Femme Fetales. Vol. 9, no. 2. pp. 40–55, 60.
- Carradine, David (1995). Endless Highway. Journey Editions. ISBN 978-1-885203-20-5.
- Koetting, Christopher T. (2009). Mind Warp!: The Fantastic True Story of Roger Corman's New World Pictures. Bristol: Hemlock Books. ISBN 978-0-9557774-1-7.
