= Crazy Mama =

1975 film by Jonathan Demme

- Theatrical release poster
- Directed by: Jonathan Demme
- Screenplay by: Robert Thom
- Story by: Frances Doel
- Produced by: Julie Corman
- Starring: Cloris Leachman; Stuart Whitman; Ann Sothern; Linda Purl; Jim Backus; Donny Most
- Cinematography: Bruce Logan
- Edited by: Allan Holzman; Lewis Teague
- Music by: Snotty Scotty and The Hankies
- Production company: New World Pictures
- Distributed by: New World Pictures
- Release dates: July 9, 1975 (Texas); November 5, 1975 (Los Angeles)
- Running time: 83 minutes
- Country: United States
- Language: English
- Budget: $2.3 million
- Box office: $2.3 million (United States and Canada rental)

Crazy Mama is a 1975 American action comedy film directed by Jonathan Demme, and produced by Julie Corman for New World Pictures. It stars Cloris Leachman, Stuart Whitman, Ann Sothern, Linda Purl, Jim Backus, Tisha Sterling and Donny Most. It also features Bill Paxton, Dennis Quaid, and Will Sampson in their (uncredited) film debuts. The story centers on a beauty parlor owner and her family, who lose their belongings to repossession, and soon start a crime spree.

== Plot ==
In 1958 Long Beach, California, Melba Stokes is a beauty salon owner, living with her mother Sheba and daughter Cheryl. They flee when landlord Mr. Albertson comes to demand the back rent and repossess their belongings.

On the road, heading back to Arkansas to reclaim the family farm, the Stokes women begin a crime spree. They rob a gas station first, then head for Las Vegas. In pursuit of pregnant Cheryl is her boyfriend, Shawn, while Melba meets up with a runaway Texas sheriff, Jim Bob Trotter. Further battles with the law along the way eventually lead to a shootout in which Jim Bob and others are killed. Melba is left alone, on the lam, but begins life again in a new town with a new look.

== Cast ==
- Cloris Leachman as Melba Stokes
  - Dinah Englund as young Melba. Englund is Leachman's real-life daughter.
- Stuart Whitman as Jim Bob Trotter
- Ann Sothern as Sheba Stokes
  - Tisha Sterling as young Sheba. Sterling is Sothern's real-life daughter.
- Linda Purl as Cheryl Stokes
- Jim Backus as Albertson
- Donny Most as Shawn
- Bryan Englund as "Snake". Englund is Leachman's real-life son.
- Merie Earle as Bertha
- Sally Kirkland as Ella Mae
- Clint Kimbrough as Daniel
- Dick Miller as Wilbur Janeway
- Carmen Argenziano as Supermarket Manager
- Harry Northup as FBI Agent
- Ralph James as Sheriff
- John Aprea as Marvin
- Vince Barnett as Homer
- Beach Dickerson as Desk Clerk

Uncredited

- Bill Paxton as John
- Dennis Quaid as Bellhop
- John Milius as Police Officer
- Will Sampson as Indian at Trading Post

== Production ==
Roger Corman had enjoyed success making films about female gangsters with Bloody Mama and Big Bad Mama and wanted another one. The film was announced as Big Bad Mama II, then The American Dream before ultimately being known as Crazy Mama.

The original director was Shirley Clarke but she was fired 10 days prior to filming. Roger Corman had presold the film to exhibitors and the cast and start date was set. He called in Jonathan Demme, who had made Caged Heat for Corman and was also preparing Fighting Mad for him, and offered Demme the job of directing. Demme refused but Corman told him he had to if he wanted to make Fighting Mad. Demme agreed if his wife could direct second unit.

Demme said he told Corman, "I want to help you out, but I know this is going to end poorly... you can't jump in this fast on a movie, make it in three weeks, and then have two weeks for the editing, mix it in one day and hope for a good picture. It's going to be a mess, you're going to perceive it as a mess, you're going to get mad at me." But Corman insisted they proceed.

Demme said "all the actors hated the script - with good reason: it was lousy. It had a couple of good scenes in it, but it left a lot to be desired. It was one of those awful situations where you're trying to write it while you're shooting it. It also got shot too fast."

Demme did make some changes to the script. In the original draft the movie ended with all the leads being killed. Demme did not like that so he changed it so that everyone escaped, except for the character played by Ann Sothern as Demme disliked Sothern. Corman disliked this change, feeling that there was no ending. Demme then shot an alternative ending with the family running a burger stand in Miami in 1959.

Producer Julie Corman gave birth to her first child during production. Demme recalled " We were shooting a big gunfight/car crash scene and we had an ambulance standing by, and Julie went into labor. And our ambulance left with the producer being rushed to hospital to give birth.”

Bill Paxton was a set dresser on the film and had his first speaking role in the movie.

== Reception ==
Demme later said "Roger was furious at me" for changing the ending. "He thought I had totally ruined the movie, that this would be the first Mama film to lose money because it hadn't delivered all the elements. He was right, incidentally, it was the first to not make money, and he cancelled Fighting Mad." Demme protested this saying it was unfair since he had warned Corman that Crazy Mama "might end in tears." Corman agreed and made Fighting Mad."

On review aggregator Rotten Tomatoes, 92% of 12 reviews are positive, and the average rating is 6.5/10.

== Soundtrack ==
- "All I Have to Do Is Dream" - Performed by The Everly Brothers
- "Black Slacks" - Performed by Joe Bennett & the Sparkletones
- "Devoted to You" - Performed by The Everly Brothers
- "I've Had It" - Performed by The Bell Notes
- "Lollipop" - Performed by The Chordettes
- "Money (That's What I Want)" - Performed by Barrett Strong
- "Running Bear" - Performed by Johnny Preston
- "Sleep Walk" - Performed by Santo & Johnny
- "Transfusion" - Performed by Nervous Norvus
- "Western Movies" - Performed by The Olympics
- "Endless Sleep" - Performed by Jody Reynolds (heard in the film's trailer but not in the film)

== Home media ==
On December 17, 2010, Shout! Factory released the title on DVD, packaged as a double-feature with The Lady In Red as part of the Roger Corman Cult Classics Collection, and both on a limited edition Blu-ray in 2021 with only 1500 units made.

== See also ==
- Bloody Mama
- Big Bad Mama
- To a God Unknown
- List of American films of 1975

== Notes ==
- Demme, Jonathan (1994). "Demme on Demme". Projections: a forum for film-makers. pp. 158–197.
