= Ralph James (actor) =

American voice and character actor (1924–1992)

- Born: Ralph James Torrez; November 29, 1924; Los Angeles County, California, U.S.
- Died: March 14, 1992 (aged 67); Beverly Hills, California, U.S.
- Occupations: Actor, voice actor
- Years active: 1950s–1985
- Known for: Voice of Orson on ABC-TV's Mork & Mindy TV series Voice for various characters in Looney Tunes and Pink Panther cartoon shorts

Ralph James Torrez (November 29, 1924 – March 14, 1992) was an American voice and character actor who lived in Los Angeles County, California.

James provided voices for the Warner Bros. Looney Tunes and Merrie Melodies cartoon series, but rarely received screen credit, as generally Mel Blanc was the only voice artist credited. In particular, he provided the imitation of the voice of Walter Winchell, the narrator of the TV series The Untouchables, for Friz Freleng's 1963 parody short "The Unmentionables", for which he received (unspecified) credit.

He was the voice of Mr. Turtle in commercials for Tootsie Pops candy which ran throughout the 1970s. From 1978 to 1982, he was the voice of Orson, Mork's (Robin Williams) boss on the Planet Ork, in the Mork & Mindy TV series, a spin-off from Happy Days which launched Williams' career. In addition, James provided character voiceovers for the Pink Panther cartoon shorts produced by DePatie-Freleng.

James also made several live acting appearances, including in the 1974 action/sexploitation film Big Bad Mama, where he played a sheriff, and Capone (1975), where he played the part of "Judge J. H. Wilkerson". He also appeared in the part of "Ace" in 1975's Sixpack Annie.

James died in 1992 at the age of 67.

== Filmography ==
Year	Title	Role	Notes
1972	Wacky Taxi	Uncle Jaimie	
1973	Frasier, the Lovable Lion	Gordon Fisher	
1974	Big Bad Mama	Sheriff	
1974	Tidal Wave		(US version)
1974	The Nine Lives of Fritz the Cat	Astronaut	
1974	Land of the Lost	Voice of S'latch the Sleestak	
1975	Capone	Judge J.H. Wilkerson	
1975	Crazy Mama	Sheriff Clarence Howell Mudde - 1932	
1975	Sixpack Annie	Ace	
1976	Meanwhile, Back at the Ranch	Prologue Narrator	
1976	Moving Violation	Rockfield Deputy #3	
1977	The Gentleman Trap		
1979	Fast Charlie... the Moonbeam Rider	Sheriff Bill Bartman	
1981	Friz Freleng's Looney Looney Looney Bugs Bunny Movie	Additional vocal characterizations	
