= The Young Nurses =

1973 film by Clint Kimbrough

- Theatrical release poster
- Directed by: Clint Kimbrough
- Written by: Howard R. Cohen
- Produced by: Julie Corman
- Distributed by: New World Pictures
- Release date: 1973
- Running time: 77 minutes
- Country: United States
- Language: English

The Young Nurses is a 1973 American film directed by Clint Kimbrough. It was the fourth in the popular "nurses" cycle for New World Pictures, starting with The Student Nurses (1970).

== Plot ==
Three sexy, female health care workers expose a drug ring that is operating from inside a big city hospital.

== Cast ==
- Jeane Manson as Kitty
- Ashley Porter as Joanne
- Angela Elayne Gibbs as Michelle
- Zack Taylor as Donahue
- Jack La Rue Jr. as Ben
- William Joyce as Fairbanks
- Allan Arbus as Krebs
- Mary Doyle as Nurse Dockett
- Sally Kirkland as Woman at Clinic
- Don Keefer as Chemist
- Dick Miller as Cop
- Mantan Moreland as Old Man (as 'Man Tan Moreland')
- Samuel Fuller as Doc Haskell

== Production ==
Julie Corman had produced two "three girls" movies for New World, Night Call Nurses and The Student Teachers. She says Frances Doel, who was story editor at New World, was married to actor Clint Kimbrough, who wanted to direct. He asked Julie Corman to produce. She was reluctant until he said, “Julie, you’re the only one I could trust. I know you’ll have my back. I know you’ll help me.” So she agreed.

== Reception ==
=== Critical response ===
Critic Nathaniel Thompson wrote in his review for Turner Classic Movies that the film "feels more like an intended Pam Grier vehicle as Michelle (Cleopatra Jones' Angela Elayne Gibbs) juggles her time [...] between her nursing job and taking care of the drug dealers who are destroying her friends and neighborhood," and "the other storylines are far less interesting, with Kitty (Jeane Manson) and Joanne (Ashley Porter) getting a grip on a boat racing competition and the best way to wriggle out of their tight nurse uniforms." Writing in Slant, critic Budd Wilkins noted that director "Kimbrough brings a solid televisual style to the film, though the story's nothing more than boilerplate," and "if you've ever wanted to see [actor] Fuller kneed in the nuts and then shanked with a syringe, here's your chance."

Filmnink argued the movie "hads a few decent moments, such as an actual operating scene in which the girls participate, and some feminist stuff about a pioneering female clinic... but still isn’t much of a movie; it lacks energy, feels undercast, and Kimborough’s direction is flabby."

== See also ==
- List of American films of 1973
