= Clint Kimbrough =

American actor (1933–1996)

- Born: Louis Lacy Clinton Kimbrough; March 8, 1933
- Died: April 9, 1996 (aged 63)

Louis Lacy Clinton Kimbrough (March 8, 1933 – April 9, 1996) was an American actor.

== Early life ==
Kimbrough was born in Oklahoma City on March 8, 1933, to parents Fred and Lucinda (Yoakum) Kimbrough. After his birth, his family moved to Allen, Oklahoma, where Kimbrough attended Allen High School (AHS), graduating in 1951.

Kimbrough demonstrated theatrical ability while still at school. In 1948, as President of Allen's Teen Town, he helped produce the "Gay Nineties Ball". As a junior at AHS, he wrote, produced and directed the 1950 senior play, a full-length production entitled Broadway. After graduating from AHS, Kimbrough enrolled for a year at Oklahoma University.

He then completed two years in the US Signal Corps, stationed in Korea, before he made his professional stage debut in Brandon Thomas's play Charley's Aunt in 1953 aged 20, billed as "Lewis Clinton Kimbrough".

== American Academy of Dramatic Arts and the Actors Studio ==
Kimbrough subsequently enrolled in the American Academy of Dramatic Arts in New York. Shortly thereafter, with the help of fellow Oklahoman Lonny Chapman, Kimbrough joined Lee Strasberg's Actors Studio, an incubator for acting talent. Kimbrough gained a reputation for his ability to understand the character he was asked to play. His work with The Actors Studio resulted in his first film role, The Strange One, which used a cast and crew entirely of Actors Studio personnel. An appearance in A Face in the Crowd followed, and Kimbrough established a working relationship with director Elia Kazan that lasted ten years.

== Theater ==
Kimbrough appeared in an 11-month Broadway run of Thornton Wilder's Our Town, directed by José Quintero. During the 1960s, Kimbrough worked in the theater and on Broadway, performing the works of Shakespeare, Arthur Miller, Neil Simon, Eugene O'Neill and Tennessee Williams.

== Television ==
In the late 1950s, Kimbrough appeared on live television on numerous occasions, including weekly shows such as Westinghouse Studio One, G.E. Theater and U.S. Steel Hour. He was in an NBC TV production of Our Town, again directed by José Quintero.

== Film ==
Kimbrough had a feature role in Hal B. Wallis's 1958 Hot Spell. He moved from New York to Hollywood in the late 1960s and developed an association with Roger Corman, known as "King of the B Movies", with roles in several 1970s film productions, such as Von Richthofen and Brown, Bloody Mama, Crazy Mama and the Nurse movies. He directed The Young Nurses.

== Personal life and death ==
Kimbrough was at one time married to Frances Doel, writer of Crazy Mama. He died from pneumonia on April 9, 1996, at the age of 63.

== Clint Kimbrough Film Festival ==
Since 2007, a film festival has taken place in Allen, Oklahoma during the annual Alumni Weekend in June, aiming to acquaint the public with Kimbrough's career and work.

== Performance history ==
- Broadway (March 10, 1950) – (play written, directed and produced by 17-year-old Kimbrough, a junior at Allen High School, staged at the AHS Gymnasium)
- Charley's Aunt (1953) – Brassett (Stage debut of "Lewis Clinton Kimbrough" as a member of the Gateway Stock Company of New York at Gatlinburg, Tennessee)
- Picnic (1955) - Bomber the paper boy (While studying at the American Academy of Dramatic Arts; opened at the Barbizon-Plaza Theatre in New York City on October 28, 1955)
- Dulcy (1956) – Tom Sterrett (As a senior at the American Academy of Dramatic Arts; Staged at the Coronet Theatre in New York City, March 29, 1956)
- Mister Roberts (1956) – Payne (December 10, 1956, New York City Center production)
- South Pacific (1957) – uncredited sailor (Staged during the Spring 1957 season at the New York City Center by the NYCC Light Opera Company)
- The Strange One (1957) (Kimbrough' first film performance, released by Columbia in April, 1957)* Arms and the Man (1957) – (Stock production)
- Studio One: "The Weston Strain" (May 27, 1957) – Paul (Kimbrough's first television appearance)
- Studio One: "The Night America Trembled" (Season 10, Episode 1; September 9, 1957) – Bob
- Hot Spell (1958) – Billy
- U.S. Steel Hour: "Trap for a Stranger" (February 25, 1959) – Elroy Hubbard
- Alfred Hitchcock Presents (October 11, 1959) (Season 5 Episode 3: "Appointment at Eleven") – David 'Davie' Logan
- Our Town (November 13, 1959) – George Gibbs (NBC production)
- General Electric Theater: "The Last Dance" (November 22, 1959)
- R.C.M.P. (Royal Canadian Mounted Police): "Target for the Law" (Season 1, Episode 25; May 4, 1960) – Mattice
- Camino Real (1960) – Kilroy (Off-Broadway, St. Marks Playhouse production opening May 16, 1960)
- Laurette (1960) – Jack (Opening at the Shubert Theatre in New Haven, Connecticut on September 30, 1960)
- U.S. Steel Hour: "Summer Rhapsody" (Season 8, Episode 18; May 3, 1961)
- Look, We’ve Come Through (1961) – (Premiered October 25, 1961 at the Hudson Theatre)
- Time Remembered (1963) – Prince Albert (Opened July 9, 1963 at the Peninsula Players Garden Theatre in Fish Creek, Wisconsin)
- Shot in the Dark (1963) – Young magistrate (Opened July 16, 1963 at the Peninsula Players Fish Creek Theater)
- The Zoo Story (1963) – Young hoodlum (Production by the Peninsula Players of Fish Creek, Wisconsin)* Come Blow Your Horn (1963) – Elder brother (Opened August 20, 1963, performed by the Peninsula Players)
- But For Whom Charlie (1964) – Willard Prosper (By the Lincoln Center Repertory Co. under the direction of Elia Kazan)
- The Changeling (1964) – Pedro (Production of the Lincoln Center Repertory Co. under the direction of Elia Kazan)
- Incident at Vichy (1965) – Nazi Professor Hoffman (Production of the Lincoln Center Repertory Co. under the direction of Elia Kazan)
- Tartuffe (1965) – unnamed role (Ran January 14, 1965 to May 22, 1965, at the Repertory Theater of the Lincoln Center, New York City)
- Saint Joan (1965) – Dunois (Opened a new season at the Milwaukee Repertory Theater on October 29, 1965)
- Diary of a Scoundrel (1965) – Gloumov (Opened November 18, 1965 at the Milwaukee Repertory Theater)
- Henry IV, Part 1 (1966) – Prince Hal (Opened February 27, 1966 at the Milwaukee Repertory Theater)
- Marat/Sade (1966) – Marat (Opened October 24, 1966 at Theatre Co. of Boston)
- Crazy Mama (1970) - Daniel the father
- Bloody Mama (1970) – Arthur Barker
- The Night Thoreau Spent in Jail (1971) – Henry David Thoreau (Opened October 13, 1971 at the New Mexico State University Theater)
- Von Richthofen and Brown (1971) – German Major Von Hoeppner
- Magic Carpet (November 6, 1972) – John Doolittle (Filmed on location and first broadcast by NBC as the unsuccessful pilot for a weekly TV series)
- The Crucible (1972) – Jon Proctor (New Mexico State University production opening September 30, 1972)
- Night Call Nurses (1972) – Dr. Bramlett
- The Young Nurses (1973) – (as Director)
