= Weekend at Bernie's II =

1993 American black comedy film

- Theatrical release poster
- Directed by: Robert Klane
- Written by: Robert Klane
- Based on: Characters created by Robert Klane
- Produced by: Victor Drai; Joseph Perez
- Starring: Andrew McCarthy; Jonathan Silverman; Terry Kiser; Barry Bostwick
- Cinematography: Edward Morey III
- Edited by: Peck Prior
- Music by: Peter Wolf
- Production company: Victor Drai Productions
- Distributed by: TriStar Pictures
- Release date: July 9, 1993
- Running time: 89 minutes
- Country: United States
- Language: English
- Budget: $15–17 million
- Box office: $12.7 million

Weekend at Bernie's II is a 1993 American dark comedy film written and directed by Robert Klane. It is the sequel to Klane's 1989 comedy Weekend at Bernie's and starring Andrew McCarthy, Jonathan Silverman, Terry Kiser and Barry Bostwick.

Taking place a few days after the first film, it tells the story of Larry and Richard once again ending up with their late boss' corpse which is targeted by a voodoo queen hired by mobsters who want to find the $2 million that Bernie embezzled.

The film was panned by critics and grossed $12.7 million at the box office.

== Plot ==
Larry Wilson and Richard Parker are at a Manhattan morgue where they see the corpse of their CEO, Bernie Lomax. Larry falsely claims Bernie as his uncle so he can get some of Bernie's possessions, including Bernie's credit card. At the insurance company, Larry and Richard are quizzed by their boss and Arthur Hummel, the company's internal investigator, who ask them if they have the $2 million that Bernie embezzled. They deny knowing where the money is, but their boss believes they are lying and fires them. He also sends Hummel after them, giving him two weeks to prove their guilt.

Over dinner, paid for with Bernie's credit card, Larry tells Richard he found a key to a safe deposit box in St. Thomas, U.S. Virgin Islands. Larry asks Richard if he will use the computer at work to see if the $2 million is in Bernie's account. At first, Richard refuses but ultimately gives in.

Meanwhile, in the U.S. Virgin Islands, a voodoo queen named Mobu is hired by mobsters to find the $2 million Bernie stole. She sends two servants, Henry and Charles, to go to New York, get Bernie's body, use a voodoo ceremony to reanimate him, and bring him back to her so he can lead her to the money. Accidents plague their attempts to get Bernie back. They prepare in a bathroom at a shady adult movie theatre for the voodoo ceremony. Having lost the sacrificial chicken, they use a pigeon instead. As a result, Bernie is reanimated but only moves when he hears music. At the 42nd Street–Grand Central subway station, Henry and Charles soon abandon him to chase a man who stole their boombox.

Later that night, Larry and Richard sneak into their office building to check Bernie's account, only to find that Bernie is the only one who can open it. Police officers soon arrest them for breaking and entering. After their release, they find Bernie, whom they believe is still wholly dead, stuff him into a suitcase, bring him with them to the Virgin Islands, and put him into a small refrigerator in their hotel room.

Unbeknownst to the two, Hummel is following them to recover the embezzled cash. The men use Bernie to open his safety deposit box, but only find a map. Meanwhile, Larry befriends a lovely native girl named Claudia and gives her the map. Henry and Charles capture the two and take them to Mobu. With one of the mobsters holding a gun to his head, she forces Richard to drink a poisonous potion and tells them they must find the map by sundown to get the antidote.

When Larry, Richard and Claudia are reunited, they are shocked to discover that the undead Bernie is moving and realize he is leading them towards the $2 million. They put a Walkman with headphones on his head to keep him moving. As Bernie finds a large chest underwater, their resulting excitement causes Larry to accidentally shoot Bernie in the head with a speargun, destroying the headphones.

They attempt to bring Bernie back to the surface but he will not let go of the chest, which is too heavy to hoist out of the water. They end up attaching Bernie to a horse carriage with music playing. It seems to work at first, but the carriage goes out of control when they go downhill. Eventually, the carriage ends up at Mobu's place. Bernie hits a large tree branch and spins into a somersault before knocking out Mobu. The crash also causes Bernie to drop the chest on the ground, and it breaks open. Larry tries to scoop up the money, but is caught by Hummel (now slightly unhinged upon seeing the undead Bernie walk), and he gives the $2 million to him. With Mobu out of commission, Claudia's father, a medical doctor, says that he can cure Richard if he can get the blood of a virgin (which Larry confesses he can provide). The mobsters and Mobu are arrested.

Larry confesses to Richard that he returned the $2 million to the insurance company, but only after learning Bernie stole $3 million. Larry and Richard use some of the remaining million to purchase a yacht crewed by attractive women. Bernie leads Henry and Charles, who have been transformed into goats by voodoo, through a Carnival parade.

== Cast ==
- Andrew McCarthy as Lawrence "Larry" Wilson
- Jonathan Silverman as Richard Parker
- Terry Kiser as Bernie Lomax
- Barry Bostwick as Arthur Hummel
- Troy Byer as Claudia
- Novella Nelson as Mobu
- Tom Wright as Charles
- Steve James as Henry
- Gary Dourdan as Cartel Man
- Stack Pierce as Claudia's Dad
- Constance Shulman as Tour Operator
- Samantha Phillips as Pretty Young Thing

== Production ==
Weekend at Bernie's II was filmed in 1992 in the Territory of the Virgin Islands of the United States and in New York City. The cast and crew, who were mainly from the Los Angeles area, were on location when the Los Angeles riots of April 1992 broke out and they stated in a St. Thomas interview that they were worried for their loved ones. The Bernie dummy used in the film had been on display for the film's debut shortly before the riot's outbreak, and was robbed of its painter's hat and $400 sunglasses.

== Reception ==
On the review aggregator website Rotten Tomatoes, 13% of 31 critics' reviews are positive, with an average rating of 3.6/10. The website's consensus reads: "It would appear to be all but impossible to make a worthwhile sequel to a comedy about a corpse's exploits -- odds Weekend at Bernie's II never comes close to beating." Metacritic, which uses a weighted average, assigned the film a score of 16 out of 100, based on 20 critics, indicating "overwhelming dislike". Audiences surveyed by CinemaScore gave the film a grade of "C+" on a scale of A+ to F.

Hal Hinson of The Washington Post wrote: "If the premise of the first film was mindless and repetitive, it's doubly so this second time around." Entertainment Weekly gave it a grade of "F".

David Rooney of Variety called it "a mildly diverting farcical caper." Stephen Holden of The New York Times gave the film 3 out of 5 and praised Terry Kiser for his performance: "Through it all, Mr. Kiser, who says not a word, exudes the foolish amiability of a partygoer who is beyond plotzed and is living in a private world of his own."

=== Box office ===
The movie grossed $12,741,891 in the U.S. and Canada.

== In popular culture ==
Weekend at Bernie's II is mentioned in the eighth season episode of Seinfeld, "The Comeback". The movie is featured in the staff picks shelf at a video rental store under "Gene's Picks". Kramer recommends it to Elaine (as "a hilarious premise") instead of a staff pick by "arthouse goon" Vincent. Elaine rents it only to be disappointed and eventually yell "Bernie's dead, you morons!" at the television while watching it.

Similarly, in the NCIS episode "Deception", a character who needs to establish an alibi is too embarrassed to say which film he had been watching. The team assume he was watching a porn film, but he eventually admits it was Weekend at Bernie's II to which film geek Agent DiNozzo says "Even worse."

The movie is referenced in the How I Met Your Mother episode "How Lily Stole Christmas" when Ted attempts to insult Lily for having a poor sense of humor. "Remember that time we heard her laughing, and we thought she was watching Weekend at Bernie's but it turned out she was watching Weekend at Bernie's II!" This movie is also referenced in the How I Met Your Mother episode "Weekend at Barney's".

Beavis and Butt-Head references this movie in the episode "Most Wanted" where the main characters watch a commercial for the movie Weekend at Bernie's Part 7 which features the tagline "Bernie's still dead and he's stiffer than ever!" Bernie is shown being visibly decaying at this point.

Similar to Beavis and Butt-Head, Rick and Morty would also parody the premise of the Bernie's series in their episode "Rixty Minutes" wherein in an alternate universe, Jerry Smith is revealed to have written and directed a film entitled Last Will and Testimeow: Weekend at Dead Cat Lady's House II about a group of cats attempting to act as their elderly owner after she dies in her sleep. This includes dating, making out with, and ultimately engaging in sexual intercourse with their owner's estate holder despite the body visibly fighting to keep from decomposition, to the point one cat has to open the mouth, which is not only rotting, but is seen to have maggots inside.

On The Eric Andre Show, specifically the fifth-season episode "The ASAP Ferg Show", the titular host, Andre, "reenacted" the Bernie's series by walking around with someone dressed as, and acting dead like, Bernie, going up to random people and letting them know (despite a majority of people not having any interest), even specifically mentioning the sequel by name.

=== Movin' Like Bernie ===
Inspired by the movement of the film's namesake, a style of dance was created in the early 2010s called "Movin' Like Bernie". Homemade films went viral on the Internet, from children to soldiers serving overseas. Even professional athletes began performing the dance, including Baltimore Ravens running back Ray Rice after scoring a touchdown during a nationally televised January 2011 game against the Pittsburgh Steelers.

The 2012 Oakland Athletics adapted "Movin' Like Bernie" into their celebration routines after Coco Crisp played the song for third baseman Brandon Inge in the team's clubhouse before a game. Players such as Josh Reddick would perform the dance after a home run, big hit, or walk-off victory.
