= Vendetta (1986 film) =

1986 women's prison revenge movie directed by Bruce Logan

- Theatrical poster
- Directed by: Bruce Logan
- Written by: Laura Cavestani; John K. Adams; Emil Farkas; Simon Maskell
- Story by: Laura Cavestani; Emil Farkas
- Produced by: Jeff Begum; Ken Dalton; Ken Solomon co producer Emil Farkas
- Starring: Karen Chase; Sandy Martin; Roberta Collins; Marshall R. Teague; Greg Bradford; Will Hare
- Cinematography: Robert C. New
- Edited by: Glenn Morgan
- Music by: David Newman
- Production companies: Chroma III; International Cinevision Productions
- Distributed by: Concorde Pictures
- Release date: September 1986
- Running time: 89 minutes
- Country: United States
- Language: English

Vendetta is a 1986 women in prison film directed by Bruce Logan and starring Karen Chase and Sandy Martin. It was released in September 1986.

== Plot ==
Laurie Collins (Chase) is an attractive and highly successful stuntwoman in the motion picture industry. Her job on one film takes her to a small town not far from where her younger sister Bonnie Cusack (Michelle Newkirk) lives. Because of the close proximity, Laurie invites Bonnie to come visit her on the set, as she likely will not have time to visit her on her own.

Bonnie readily agrees, and during a night of partying, she is picked up by a man in a bar who then tries to rape her at gunpoint. Having been taught some self-defense moves by her sister, Bonnie manages to overpower her attacker and kills him with his own gun.

Though the case seems like a sure open-to-shut one of self-defense, Bonnie is shocked when she is charged with murder, as she learns that her attacker was the son of an influential local politician. Because Bonnie is from out of town, she is seen as the troublemaker and convicted on her charges. The judge sentencing her states that while she may have seemed justified by her actions, she cannot take the law into her own hands, and is sentenced to a term in the state prison.

Bonnie learns the realities of prison life when she draws the sexual interest of Kay (Martin), an influential trustee inmate who soon shows herself to be capable of making life miserable for the youngster. One night, when Bonnie is touched inappropriately by Kay, she fights back. Bonnie's victory is short-lived, however, as Kay and her gang assault her and inject her with heroin before dumping her to her death over a railing four floors up and to the floor below.

The next day, Laurie is called to claim and identify her sister's body. She sees on the report that her sister had died of a drug overdose, but when she sees her sister's dead and visibly bruised body in the morgue, Laurie concludes that a cover-up is being engineered by the authorities, and is determined to find out the truth.

Laurie decides to get arrested and inside the prison herself by intentionally driving drunk. Her efforts succeed, and she gets the same sentencing judge her sister had. However, she is shocked when the judge gives her a suspended sentence because she is a first-time offender. Outraged, Laurie proceeds to insult the judge and attempts to attack him. She is dragged off to jail as the judge revokes the sentence he had just suspended.

It does not take long for Laurie to realize who is behind her sister's death once on the inside. However, Kay does not make the same sexual advances on her as she had her sister. Laurie finally gets Kay's attention by killing Wanda, the first inmate who is part of Kay's gang, at a prison-operated wind farm.

Throughout all of this is a subplot involving Miss Dice (Roberta Collins), the head of security at the prison who is aware of the corrupt circumstances at the prison and in the judicial system, but has little power to do anything about it. When China, another one of Kay's henchwomen, is killed after Laurie attacks her at the prison pool, and then Star, who dies from a head injury after Laurie fights her in a prison shower, Dice takes an interest in the pattern and asks Kay what is going on. An anguished Kay, unaware of Laurie's relationship to Bonnie, claims not to know. Later on, two more of her people die at Laurie's hands, ultimately leaving Kay to face Laurie in a showdown of hand-to-hand combat.

Kay is stunned to discover Laurie is the one responsible for the killings and even more so when she reveals that Bonnie was her sister. Kay tells Laurie that Bonnie's death was merely an accident and that she and her cohorts just roughed her up a little. Enraged at Kay's lie, Laurie attacks Kay and proceeds to beat her into submission. While the older and heavier Kay is physically stronger and has considerable endurance for her age, she proves to be no match for Laurie's stuntwoman training. Laurie quickly gains the upper hand and proceeds to try and choke Kay to death. But then, Laurie suddenly has an attack of conscience and cannot bring herself to kill her. She leaves Kay on the floor and walks away, but Kay recovers and proceeds to chase Laurie through the prison. Kay taunts her the entire time, daring her to stand and fight. This proves to be a mistake as Laurie finally stops running and once again, Kay is soundly thrashed. Just as Laurie defeats Kay, leaving her battered and bloody on the floor, Miss Dice appears, armed with a shotgun and orders Laurie to stand down. Laurie does so, but then Kay rises up off the floor with a wrench, posed to kill Laurie. Miss Dice quickly fires a round into Kay's chest, saving Laurie.

Laurie stares in shock at Kay's body and then back at Miss Dice, who looks back at her with sympathy. "Did it bring Bonnie back?" Miss Dice asks Laurie rhetorically, revealing she knew about what Kay and her people had done to her and the reason Laurie had gotten herself imprisoned. "You have the rest of your life to think about that." The scene then cuts to the movie's final shot, showing Laurie being picked up from prison by her boyfriend and now living life as a free woman.

== Cast ==
- Karen Chase as Laurie Collins
- Sandy Martin as Kay Butler
- Kin Shriner as Steve Nelson
- Roberta Collins as Miss Dice
- Michelle Newkirk as Bonnie Cusack
- Marshall Teague as Paul Donahue
- Greg Bradford as Joe-Bob
- Mark von Zech as Randy

== Production ==
Roberta Collins was reportedly pitched for the lead role by co-writer and co-producer Emil Farkas, but declined, and instead played a less physical support part, that of a sympathetic guard. It was one of a number of performances Collins gave in Chroma III films.

== Reception ==
The Los Angeles Times called it "your typically, lurid, brutal women's prison exploitation picture cranked a coupe of notches above the usual, thanks to some verse, vivid acting under Bruce Logan's dynamic direction."

The Evening Sun said "it would be best to check all reason at the door."

The San Francisco Examiner thought "the film's major problem" was that Chase "has a rather limited repertoire of martial arts moves."

The Baltimore Sun said "it hits all the marks in this indefensible genre with the appropriate professionalism though rather too much relish for anybody's good... it's rather well made garbage."
