= Terry Kiser =

American actor (born 1939)

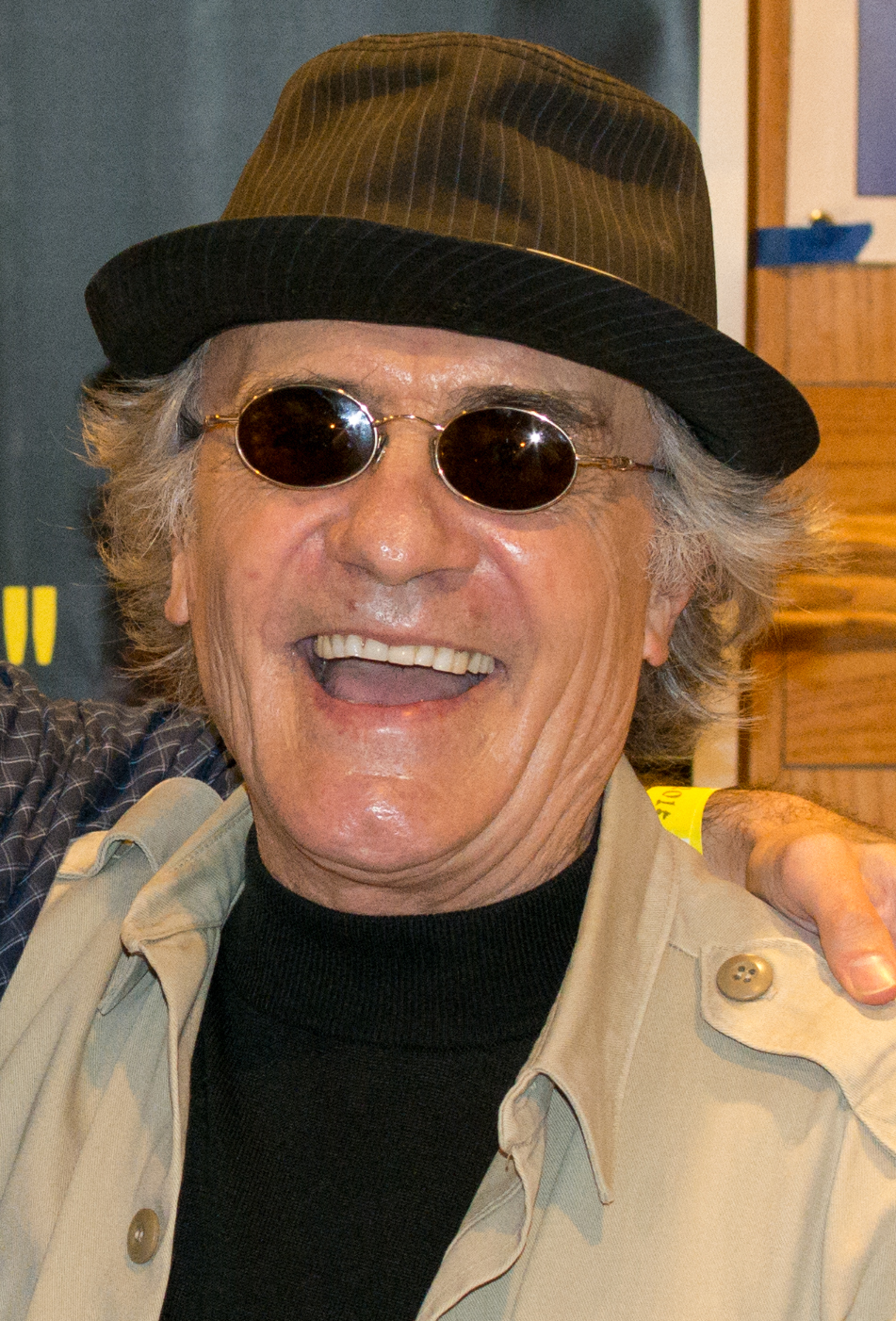
- Kiser in 2015
- Born: August 1, 1939 (age 87); Omaha, Nebraska, U.S.
- Occupation: Actor
- Years active: 1963–present
- Spouse: Sylvie Marmet (1987-2004) (one child)

Terry Kiser (born August 1, 1939) is an American actor. While he has more than 140 acting credits to his name, with a career spanning more than 50 years, he is best known for portraying the deceased title character Bernie Lomax in the comedy Weekend at Bernie's and its sequel, Weekend at Bernie's II.

== Early life and education ==
Terry Kiser was born on August 1, 1939, in Omaha, Nebraska. He attended the University of Kansas on both football and dramatic scholarships. He graduated with a degree in Industrial Engineering and worked for three years in this profession in Omaha.

== Career ==
After college, Kiser returned to his hometown Omaha and worked as an engineer for three years while acting in amateur productions including more than fifty plays. His first two years in New York City included an array of small parts, ranging from theater to television to commercials. By 1967, Kiser gained significant recognition for his work, winning both an Obie Award and Theatre World Award for Fortune and Men's Eyes.

Becoming a life member of The Actors Studio, Kiser was a regular on several soap operas, The Secret Storm and The Doctors. In 1978, he starred on the short-lived sitcoms The Roller Girls and Sugar Time!. It was during the 1970s and early 1980s that Kiser appeared in Three's Company, Hardcastle and McCormick, One Day at a Time, The Love Boat, Night Court, 227, Maude and The Golden Girls.

One of his roles was on the TV drama Hill Street Blues, playing comedian Vic Hitler ("Vic the Narcoleptic Comic"). He was a cast member on the syndicated sketch comedy show Off the Wall and a part of the ensemble on Carol Burnett's Carol & Company, which aired in 1990. In the 1990s, he appeared on Walker, Texas Ranger, The Golden Girls, The Fresh Prince of Bel-Air, Lois & Clark: The New Adventures of Superman (as H. G. Wells) and Will & Grace.

His film appearances include Fast Charlie... the Moonbeam Rider (1979), Rich Kids (1979), Steel (1979), An Eye for an Eye (1981), Making Love (1982), Six Pack (1982), Starflight: The Plane That Couldn't Land (1983), Surf II (1984), From a Whisper to a Scream (1987) and Friday the 13th Part VII: The New Blood (1988).

Kiser starred in Weekend at Bernie's (1989), in the title role of Bernie Lomax, a corrupt insurance executive who is dead for most of the film. Bernie's young employees Richard Parker and Larry Wilson, played by Jonathan Silverman and Andrew McCarthy, attempt to convince people that Bernie is still alive. He reprised the role in Weekend at Bernie's II (1993). Since 2012, several YouTube videos featuring "The Bernie Dance" generated more than 17 million views collectively by April 2016. Other film appearances include Mannequin Two: On the Move (1991), Into the Sun (1992), The Pledge (2011), and A Christmas Tree Miracle (2013).

In 2013, Kiser moved to Austin, Texas, where he founded an acting school, The Actors Arena, which closed in 2016.

== Filmography ==
=== Movies ===
- Rachel Rachel (1968) as Preacher
- Lapin 360 (1972) as Bernard Lapin
- Fast Charlie... the Moonbeam Rider (1979) as Lester Neal
- Rich Kids (1979) as Ralph Harris
- Steel (1979) as Valentino
- Seven (1979) as Senator
- All Night Long (1981) as Ultra-Save day manager
- An Eye for an Eye (1981) as Dave Pierce
- Looker (1981) as Commercial Director
- Making Love (1982) as Harrington
- Six Pack (1982) as Terk Logan
- Starflight: The Plane That Couldn't Land (1983) Freddie Barret
- Surf II (1984) as Mr. O'Finlay
- Young Lust (1984)
- From a Whisper to a Scream (1987) as Jesse Hardwick
- Friday the 13th Part VII: The New Blood (1988) as Dr. Crews
- Weekend at Bernie's (1989) as Bernie Lomax
- Side Out (1990) as Uncle Max
- Mannequin Two: On the Move (1991) as Count Gunther Spretzle / Sorcerer
- Into the Sun (1992) as Mitchell Burton
- Weekend at Bernie's II (1993) as Bernie Lomax
- Tammy and the T-Rex (1994) as Dr. Wachenstein
- Pet Shop (1994) as Joe Yeagher
- Loving Deadly (1994) as Walter
- Forest Warrior (1996) as Travis Thorne
- Divorce: A Contemporary Western (1998) as Gary
- Flamingo Dreams (2000) as Gus
- See Jane Run (2001)
- Dead Start (2009) as Mort Maxwell
- Maskerade (2011) as Mr. Peck
- The Pledge (2011) as Joe
- Speed Demons (2012)
- A Christmas Tree Miracle (2013) as Henry Banks
- Spoilers: The Movie (2014) as Mr. Stoyanovich
- Almosting It (2016) as Mort

=== Television ===
- The Doctors (1967-1968) as Dr. John Rice
- The Secret Storm (1970-1971) as Cory Boucher
- Emergency! (1976) "Fair Fight" - Wes Hubbard
- Barnaby Jones (1976) "Eyes of Terror" - Arlie
- The Bionic Woman (1976) "Mirror Image" - Matthews
- Hawaii Five-O (1977) "Blood Money is Hard to Wash" - Augie
- Sugar Time! (1978) "Punk Rock" - Manager
- All in the Family (1978) "Stale Mates" as Bob
- Maude (1978) as Reggie the sleazy telethon producer
- WKRP in Cincinnati (1979) as Jason Realli
- One Day at a Time (1979) as Parsons
- Knots Landing (1981) as Teddy Becker
- Three's Company (1981-1982) as Mr. Canon/Max
- The Fall Guy (1982) as Nick Trainer
- Tucker's Witch (1983) as Andrew Brenn
- Hardcastle and McCormick (1983) as Larry Singer
- Diff'rent Strokes (1983) "Rashomon II" - Burglar
- Hill Street Blues (1983) as Vic Hitler
- Scarecrow & Mrs. King (1984) as Keene
- Night Court (1984) as Al Craven
- The Golden Girls (1986) as Santa Claus/Don
- Knight Rider (1986) as Royal Davis
- Off The Wall (1986-1987) as various characters
- Murder, She Wrote (1988) as Wally Bryce
- Carol & Company (1990-1991) as various characters
- The Fresh Prince of Bel-Air (1993) as Mr. Hosek
- Lois & Clark: The New Adventures of Superman (1995-1996) as H. G. Wells
- Caroline in the City (1997) as Taxicab Driver
- Walker, Texas Ranger (1997) as Charlie Brooks / Maxwell 'Iceman' Kronert
- Will & Grace (1999) as Carl
- The Norm Show (2000) as Councilman Wilkinson
