= Oceans of Fire =

1986 American television film

- Genre: Action
- Written by: Walter Halsey Davis
- Directed by: Steve Carver
- Starring: Gregory Harrison; Billy Dee Williams; Lyle Alzado
- Theme music composer: Patrick Williams
- Country of origin: United States
- Original language: English

Production
- Cinematography: Tony Imi
- Editor: Anthony Redman
- Running time: 92 minutes
- Production companies: Catalina Productions; Incorporated Television Company

Original release
- Network: CBS
- Release: September 16, 1986

Oceans of Fire is a 1986 American TV film.

== Cast ==
- Gregory Harrison as Ben Laforche
- Billy Dee Williams as Jim McKinley
- Lyle Alzado as Witkowski
- Tony Burton as Clay
- Ray Mancini as Romano
- Ken Norton as Chief
- Lee Ving as Pembroke
- Cynthia Sikes as Helen Kyger
- David Carradine as J.C. Busch
- R. G. Armstrong as Rusty West
- Ramon Bieri as Chuck Horn
- Alan Fudge as Bartlett
- David Wohl as Ira Handel
- Jeff Cooper as Handsome

== Reception ==
It had an audience of 14 million.
