= Robert Klane =

American screenwriter (1941–2023)

- Robert Klane directing Donna Summer on set of Thank God It's Friday
- Born: October 17, 1941; Port Jefferson, New York, U.S.
- Died: August 29, 2023 (aged 81); Woodland Hills, California, U.S.
- Occupations: Writer, director, novelist
- Spouses: Linda Tesh (m. 1962; div. 1975) Anjanette Comer (m. 1976; div. 1983) J.C. Scott (m. 1984)
- Writing career
- Notable works: Where's Poppa? Weekend at Bernie's

Robert Klane (October 17, 1941 – August 29, 2023) was an American screenwriter, novelist and filmmaker, best known for early iconoclastic novels and for his screenplays for dark comedies such as Where's Poppa? (1970) and Weekend at Bernie's (1989).

== Career ==
A 1963 graduate of the University of North Carolina at Chapel Hill, Klane first rose to prominence with his debut novel, the acerbic comedy The Horse is Dead (1968). His second novel, Where's Poppa? (1970), was adapted by Klane into a feature film directed by Carl Reiner and starring George Segal. For his screenplay, Klane received a Writers Guild of America Award nomination. His third novel was also adapted into a feature film, Fire Sale (1977), starring Alan Arkin.

Klane went on to write screenplays for various films such as The Man with One Red Shoe (1985), National Lampoon's European Vacation (1985), and Weekend at Bernie's. He also directed several films including Thank God It's Friday (1978) and Weekend at Bernie's II (1993). Additionally, he wrote for several television shows including M*A*S*H and Tracey Takes On...

== Death ==
Klane died from kidney failure in Woodland Hills, California, on August 29, 2023, at the age of 81.

== Works ==
- The Horse is Dead (1968)
- Where's Poppa? (1970)
- Fire Sale (1975)

== Screenplays ==
Partial list:

- Where's Poppa? (1970) - wrote screenplay based on his novel
- Every Little Crook and Nanny (1972) - co-wrote screenplay
- Fire Sale (1977) - wrote screenplay based on his novel
- Unfaithfully Yours (1984) - co-wrote screenplay
- The Man with One Red Shoe (1985) - wrote screenplay
- National Lampoon's European Vacation (1985) - wrote screenplay
- Walk Like a Man (1987) - wrote screenplay
- Weekend at Bernie's (1989) - wrote screenplay
- Folks! (1992) - wrote screenplay
- Tracey Takes On... (1997) - wrote 15 episodes

== Director ==
Partial list:

- Thank God It's Friday (1978) - directed
- Weekend at Bernie's II (1993) - wrote screenplay and directed
