= Frances Doel =

British writer and story editor (1942–2025)

Frances Margaret Doel
- Born: 15 April 1942; London, England
- Died: 26 May 2025 (aged 83)
- Occupations: Writer, story editor
- Spouse: Clint Kimbrough

Frances Margaret Doel (15 April 1942 – 26 May 2025) was a British writer and story editor, notable for her long association with Roger Corman. Doel was head of the script department at New World Pictures; Jon Davison said that at one stage Doel "wrote just about every first draft of every picture" at New World.

Joe Dante said there was a theory that the two people most responsible for Corman's success were Charles B. Griffith and Doel. Filmink magazine stated "Doel’s actual script credits don’t do justice to her career – she surpasses Griffith as the most influential writer in Corman’s career."

== Life and career ==
Corman was born in London on 15 April 1942. She met Doel when looking for an assistant in the mid-1960s. He contacted a tutor at Oxford University and asked him who his finest student was; the tutor suggested Doel. Doel was a graduating scholarship student of St. Hilda’s College.

She moved to Los Angeles to work for Corman and went with him when he set up New World Pictures. She was responsible for writing and developing scripts, co ordinating projects and in production and working as script supervisor.

Corman liked to recruit writers from the world of novels and short stories rather than movies and TV, and relied on Doel to make recommendations. She helped discover John Sayles, being impressed by the latter's short stories and arranging for him to rewrite Piranha. Sayles observed, " I always thought of Frances as the opposite of the kid who’s supposed to be reading Chaucer, but inside the book he’s got a comic book. She had the comic book on the outside and was actually reading the Atlantic.”

== Post-New World ==
In the early 1980s, Doel worked at Orion Pictures as an executive under Mike Medavoy, working on such films as The Terminator (1984), Robocop (1987), The Falcon and the Snowman (1985) and Desperately Seeking Susan (1985).

Doel worked as a development executive at Disney under Jeffrey Katzenberg. She co produced Starship Troopers with Jon Davison, who had worked at New World.

Doel returned to Corman to work for his Concorde-New Horizons.

Doel was married to Clint Kimbrough who she divorced. She died after a long illness on 26 May 2025, at the age of 83, and was survived by her longtime companion Harrison Reiner.

== Select credits ==
- Gas-s-s-s (1970) – assistant
- Big Bad Mama (1974)
- Crazy Mama (1975) – story
- Deathsport (1978) – story
- Avalanche (1978) – story
- Raptor (2001)
- Dinocroc (2004)
- Supergator (2007)
- Dinoshark (2010)
