= Jocks (film) =

1987 film by Steve Carver

- Theatrical release poster
- Directed by: Steve Carver
- Written by: David Oas
- Produced by: John C. Broderick; Ahmet Yasa
- Starring: Scott Strader; Perry Lang; Mariska Hargitay; Richard Roundtree
- Cinematography: Adam Greenberg
- Edited by: Tom Siiter
- Music by: David McHugh
- Production company: Shady Acres
- Distributed by: Crown International Pictures
- Release date: January 23, 1987
- Running time: 90 minutes
- Country: United States
- Language: English

Jocks is a 1987 teen comedy film directed by Steve Carver and written by Michael Lanahan and David Oas. Jocks was shot in Las Vegas and in Los Angeles.

== Plot ==
Coach Williams (Richard Roundtree) must get his tennis players into shape for the big play-offs in Las Vegas. The Kid (Scott Strader) and his buddies run wild in Vegas on and off the court as the coach tries to keep the players out of trouble before the match. Christopher Lee and R. G. Armstrong appear in character roles with Mariska Hargitay in the role of the heroine, Nicole, a scout.

== Cast ==
- Scott Strader as The Kid
- Perry Lang as Jeff
- Mariska Hargitay as Nicole
- Richard Roundtree as Chip Williams
- R. G. Armstrong as Coach Bettlebom
- Stoney Jackson as Andy
- Adam Mills as Tex
- Donald Gibb as Ripper
- Tom Shadyac as Chris
- Christopher Murphy as Tony
- Katherine Kelly Lang as Julie
- Christopher Lee as President White
- Trinidad Silva as Chito
- Marianne Gravatte Woman On The Jocks Poster
- Faith Minton as Big Woman In Bar (uncredited)

== Production ==
The film was originally known as Road Trip. It was an early appearance by Mariska Hargitay who said the producer wanted her to do a nude sequence but she refused. "They compromised a little and I compromised a little", she said. "Originally my part had a little bit of nudity but I don't do nudity."

== Reception ==
=== Box office ===
Jocks was released in 1987 but never received a wide release. The film grossed only $120,808, making it one of the larger box office failures of 1987.

=== Critical response ===
For the most part, the film was either ignored or attacked by critics. David Cornelius of DVD talk.com gave the film a negative review saying,

The script is rambling and forgetful ... its characters lack the very charm the movie is convinced it's oozing, the tennis sequences are maddeningly dull, the romance is vacant. This is the kind of movie that thinks it's a blast because it shows us college kids getting drunk and leering at women, not realizing that you need to put in these things called "jokes" to make such a premise work.
