= Starflight: The Plane That Couldn't Land =

1983 television film

- Theatrical poster
- Genre: Science fiction; Thriller
- Written by: Peter R. Brooke; Robert M. Young
- Directed by: Jerry Jameson
- Starring: Lee Majors; Hal Linden; Lauren Hutton; Ray Milland; Gail Strickland; George DiCenzo; Tess Harper; Terry Kiser
- Music by: Lalo Schifrin
- Country of origin: United States
- Original language: English

Production
- Executive producers: Allan Manings; Henry Winkler
- Producers: Peter Nelson; Arnold H. Orgolini
- Production locations: Laird International Studio - 9336 W. Washington Blvd., Culver City, California
- Cinematography: Héctor R. Figueroa (credited as Hector Figueroa)
- Editor: John F. Link
- Running time: 105 min.
- Production companies: Orgolini-Nelson Productions; Orion Pictures

Original release
- Network: ABC
- Release: February 27, 1983

Starflight: The Plane That Couldn't Land (also known as Starflight One or Airport 85 (Note: Starflight: The Plane That Couldn’t Land was also released worldwide in theatrical form under a number of different titles: in Germany as Starflight One – Irrflug ins Weltall, and in Japan as Starflight 1: Kiken'na Uchuu Hikou (スターフライト1： 危険な宇宙飛行).)) is a 1983 television film (for the ABC Sunday Night Movie) directed by Jerry Jameson and starring Lee Majors, Hal Linden, Lauren Hutton, Ray Milland, Gail Strickland, George DiCenzo, Tess Harper, and Terry Kiser. The film also features an all-star ensemble television cast in supporting roles.

Jameson had become known for his work on "... movie-of-the-week phenomenon and group-jeopardy suspense and terror." His work with Lee Majors had begun with the television series The Six Million Dollar Man in 1973, with the actor starring in three of Jameson's later films.

== Plot ==
Starflight, the first hypersonic transport, is being prepared for its maiden flight from Los Angeles to Sydney, Australia. Pilot Cody Briggs is cheating on his wife Janet with Erica Hansen, media-relations representative for Thornwell Aviation. Passengers include designer Josh Gilliam, apprehensive about the engines not being under ground control, and satellite TV baron Freddie Barrett. Takeoff is delayed so the body of the deceased Australian ambassador, accompanied by his wife, Mrs. Winfield, can be loaded. Del, the first officer, considers this a bad omen. Also on board are print and television reporters, communications entrepreneur Freddie Barrett, gold thief Hal Parisi and his bride who does not know of Hal's crime, and Thornwell electrical engineer Joe Pedowski who is afraid of flying.

Freddie Barrett orders his partner in Australia, Bud Culver, to launch a rocket carrying a TV satellite despite poor weather and without NASA approval. The rocket's second stage is destroyed in space. When Starflight takes off with its scramjet engines, it encounters debris from the rocket. Cody tries to climb above the debris but it hits Starflight's underside. Cody is unable to shut the jets shut off when debris severs the controls and their hydrogen fuel runs out just as Starflight reaches orbit.

NASA dispatches the Space Shuttle Columbia to refuel Starflight and bring Josh Gilliam back to Earth to work on the problem. A damaged power conduit is shut down, stopping the media's transmissions. Starflight's flight engineer Pete is killed when an airlock hatch breaks free. Improvising, Cody sends Josh to Columbia inside the ambassador's coffin and Columbia lands at Thornwell's mothballed shuttle-handling facility for service. Josh discovers Thornwell's universal docking tunnel, a flexible conduit that could be attached between Starflight and Columbia.

When Cody restores power for the media, a cable in the section damaged by rocket debris is electrified and Parisi's stolen bricks of gold escape from the plane's cargo hold in view of the passengers. Parisi wants to escape the spacecraft, but his wife tells the captain what she now knows.

Columbia and six astronauts arrive with the tunnel. Five passengers, including Hal Parisi, are successfully evacuated but the next five, including Freddie Barrett, are lost when the flexible tunnel swings too close to the sparking electric line and ignites. Forty-seven passengers remain aboard. Nancy reminds Josh of a fuel tank built by Culver Aviation that can be repurposed to carry people. Columbia lands safely and Parisi is arrested.

Q.T. Thornwell tries unsuccessfully to stop Josh's plan to use Culver's tank; he is bitter about industrial espionage by Culver against Thornwell's shuttle-handling investment. Columbia launches again with the container and takes on 38 more passengers, leaving nine behind.

Cody sends Joe Pedowski on an EVA, in a spacesuit to repair the damaged wiring, and Josh suggests to NASA that Starflight follow a shuttle on re-entry, believing the shuttle's heat shield would offer protection. Shuttle XU-5, in orbit on a military mission, arrives just as Starflight is about to drift into the upper atmosphere. The two craft descend together, Starflight suffers minor structural damage, and Cody pilots her through a harrowing steep descent of 60-plus miles to a successful landing.

== Cast ==
- Lee Majors as Captain Cody Briggs
- Hal Linden as Josh Gilliam
- Lauren Hutton as Erica Hansen
- Ray Milland as Q.T. Thornwell
- Gail Strickland as Nancy Gilliam
- George DiCenzo as Bowdish
- Tess Harper as Janet Briggs
- Terry Kiser as Freddie Barrett
- Heather McAdam as Laurie Hansen
- Michael Sacks as Pete
- Gary Bayer as Martin
- Phil Coccoioletti as Hal Parisi
- Pat Corley as Joe Pedowski
- Jocelyn Brando as Mrs. Harvey
- Diane Stilwell as Betty
- Kirk Cameron as Gary
- Carolyn Coates as Clair
- Stephen Keep as Chris Lucas
- Kirk Scott as Del, the first officer
- Peter Jason as Schultie
- Robert Englund as Scott
- Robert Webber as Felix Duncan
- Redmond Gleeson as Bud Culver

== Production ==
The visual effects in Starflight: The Plane That Couldn’t Land were attributed to noted effects artist John Dykstra and Brick Price Movie Miniatures.

The film's visual effects were supervised by veteran effects guru John Dykstra's Apogee effects house. Starflight: The Plane That Couldn’t Land made use of stock footage of launches by the space shuttle Columbia and an Apollo-era Saturn V on the launch pad. Columbia makes three launches in 24 hours to help Starflight (something completely impossible given turnaround times for shuttle launches). The Saturn V shown at the Kennedy Space Center was depicted as carrying the communications satellite from a fictitious launch site near Sydney. Each time Columbia lands, the touchdown footage is from the early shuttle days when they landed on the dirt runway at Edwards AFB, rather than the concrete runway that Thornwell would be expected to have. Footage of the approach and landing tests with the shuttle prototype Enterprise was used. A chase plane is also visible. (Note: Each time the shuttle launches, it has a white-painted external fuel tank, only used on the first two shuttle launches; beginning with the third flight, STS-3, the external tank was orange, which is the natural color of the foam on the tank.)

== Reception ==
The New York Times said Starflight: The Plane That Couldn’t Land was "... still another reworking of the escapist adventure stuff that proved so popular in the film Airport." A later review by Dave Sindelar noted that the film was a cross between Marooned (1969) and the Airport movies. It also relied heavily on stock NASA footage to its detriment. Also, Starflight: The Plane That Couldn’t Land was "... slow-moving, mired by disaster-movie style cliches, implausible, and has plenty of dead spots."
