= A Christmas Tree Miracle =

2013 film directed by J.W. Myers

- Directed by: J. W. Myers
- Written by: Ty DeMartino
- Produced by: J.W. Myers; Ty DeMartino; Kristin Seibert
- Starring: Kevin Sizemore; Terry Kiser; Jill Whelan
- Cinematography: Ryan Schlagbaum
- Edited by: Ryan Schlagbaum
- Music by: Bruce Broughton
- Production companies: Route 40 Films; Flyover Films
- Release date: 2013
- Running time: 102 minutes
- Country: United States
- Language: English

A Christmas Tree Miracle is a 2013 holiday film directed by J. W. Myers.

== Plot ==
The story centers on the George family. Bothered by the upcoming Christmas holiday, father David (Kevin Sizemore) is focused on work, mother Julie (Claudia Esposito) is frazzled by the season and teens Nick (Barrett Carnahan) and Natalie (Emily Capehart) are focused on their ever-growing Christmas lists. It's only 6 year old Nina (Siomha Kenney) who truly has any Christmas spirit. When David loses his land developer job right before the holidays, the family's finances cascade out of control until an eccentric tree farmer named Henry (Terry Kiser) offers them a place to stay and a new chance at their lives.

== Cast ==
- Kevin Sizemore as David George
- Claudia Esposito as Julie George
- Terry Kiser as Henry Banks
- Jill Whelan as Cindy Cruthers
- Barrett Carnahan as Nick George
- Emily Capehart as Natalie George
- Siomha Kenney as Nina George
- Michael Guy Allen as Senator John Cutter

== Production ==
The movie was filmed in 2011 on the Feisley Tree farm in Belmont, Ohio and in the Wheeling, West Virginia area.

The film premiered at the Capitol Theatre in Wheeling in December 2013, coinciding with a DVD release by Green Apple Entertainment (U.S.) and Spotlight Pictures (international). The movie made its U.S. television premiere during UPTV's "Everything You Love about Christmas" on November 26, 2014.

== Reception ==
The Dove Foundation said it "is entertaining and uplifting for everyone, earning it the Dove Seal of Approval for All Ages."

== See also ==
- List of Christmas films
