= Jeff Cooper (actor) =

Canadian actor

- Born: c. 1936; Hamilton, Ontario, Canada
- Died: March 24, 2018 (aged 81–82); Hamilton, Ontario, Canada
- Education: Central Collegiate

George Frederick "Jeff" Cooper (Hamilton, Ontario, Canada, c.1936 – March 24, 2018) was a Canadian actor who participated in projects of diverse genres in both film and television.

== Early life ==
George Frederick Cooper was born in Hamilton, Ontario. He first auditioned for film roles but as he was not having any success he decided to go for the realtor business. Coincidentally, the day he received his license was the same day he was cast as Dr. Simon Ellby in the hit T.V. soap opera show Dallas. Cooper played the role from 1979 to 1981.

== Career ==
Besides his famous role as Dr. Ellby he was also cast in various iconic roles. In Mexico, he was perhaps best known as the superhero Kalimán in the famous international production of Kalimán, el hombre increíble (Kalimán, the incredible man) and its sequel Kalimán en el siniestro mundo de Humanón (Kalimán in the sinister world of Humanón.)

Another iconic role of his is the character of Cord in the Bruce Lee written film Circle of Iron, where he co-starred with David Carradine and Christopher Lee.

Cooper left Hollywood in 1995 and moved back to his hometown of Hamilton. He spent his days playing guitar, working out at the local YMCA, and reading books he checked out from the public library.

== Filmography ==
Film performances
| Year | Title | Role | Notes |
|---|---|---|---|
| 1966 | Duel at Diablo | Trooper Casey | Uncredited |
| 1967 | The Born Losers | Gangrene | |
| 1968 | The Impossible Years | Bartholmew Smuts | |
| 1968 | 1001 Nights | Omar | |
| 1968 | Mir hat es immer Spaß gemacht | Bob Greene | |
| 1973 | Kalimán, el hombre increíble | Kalimán | |
| 1974 | A Knife for the Ladies | Burns | |
| 1975 | Viaje fantástico en globo | Kennedy | |
| 1976 | Kalimán en el siniestro mundo de Humanón | Kalimán | |
| 1978 | Circle of Iron | Cord | |
| 1986 | Oceans of fire | Handsome Man | TV movie |
| 2002 | Bleed | Pool Party Person | Also costume designer |
| 2006 | The Abberdine County Conjurer | Sean Steel | Also director |

Television performances
| Year | Title | Role | Notes |
|---|---|---|---|
| 1961 | Hawaiian Eye | Orville Granger | The Final Score |
| 1963 | The Great Adventure | Micajah Clark | Episode: "The Treasure Train of Jefferson Clark" |
| 1963 | The Alfred Hitchcock Hour | Pete Phillips | Season 2 Episode 8: "The Cadaver" |
| 1964 | Bob Hope Presents The Chrysler Theatre | The MC | Episode: "Runaway" |
| 1964 | Channing | Professor Gray | Episode: "Freedom Is a Lovesome Thing God Wot" |
| 1964 | Broadside | Lieutenant Davison | Episode: "The Great Lipstick War" |
| 1964 | The Virginian | Matt Potter | Episode: "All Nice and Legal" |
| 1964 | Profiles in Courage | Killroy | Episode: "John Adams" |
| 1965 | Kraft Suspense Theatre | Daniel | Episode: "In Darkness Waiting", Parts 1 & 2 |
| 1965 | Perry Mason | Henning Dolwig | Episode: "The Case of the Impetuous Imp" |
| 1965 | Vacation Playhouse | Frank Merriwell | Episode: "Frank Merriwell" |
| 1976 | Wonder Woman | Major Charlie Scott | TV role |
| 1977 | Barnaby Jones | Billy Cranston | TV role |
| 1979 | Dallas | Dr. Simon Ellby | 19 episodes |
| 1980 | Beyond Westworld | Dean Stoner | |
| 1981 | The Love Boat | Humphrey Clark | |
| 1981 | Vega$ | Mike Kier | |
| 1982 | The Greatest American Hero | Reo Crocker | |
| 1982 | The Powers of Matthew Star | Vate | |
| 1983 | Knight Rider | Ricky | |

== Death ==
Cooper died on March 24, 2018, in his hometown of Hamilton, Ontario, at the age of 82. He was survived by his wife Colette, a well-known realtor in the area.
