= A. J. Bakunas =

American stunt performer

A.J. Bakunas
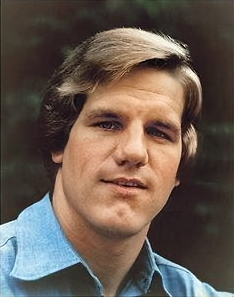
- Born: Albert John Bakunas; October 23, 1950; Englewood, New Jersey, US
- Died: September 22, 1978 (aged 27); Lexington, Kentucky, US
- Cause of death: Falling
- Occupation: Stunt performer

Albert John Bakunas, Jr (October 23, 1950 – September 22, 1978), a.k.a. A.J. Bakunas, was an American stunt performer who died doubling for George Kennedy in a fall from the Kincaid Towers in Lexington, Kentucky, for the film Steel (1979).

== Career ==
Born in Fort Lee, New Jersey, Bakunas quit his job as a gym teacher at Tenafly (N.J.) High School in 1974 and set out to break into the film industry. He did his first stunt work for the 1975 film Dog Day Afternoon. Bakunas became known for expertly performing falls from great heights. He was also an uncredited stuntman in Elliot Silverstein's 1977 movie The Car, falling from a bridge.

In 1978, Bakunas set a world record with a 70.1-metre (230 ft) fall from a helicopter for the film Hooper, which was broken that same year by Dar Robinson's 87.2-metre (286 ft) fall for a non-movie-related publicity stunt.

Bakunas, determined to retake the record, returned to Lexington to perform a 96-metre (310 ft) jump from the 22nd floor of a construction site, where he had previously successfully fallen nine stories. On September 21, 1978, as his father and a crowd of about 1,000 watched, Bakunas performed the fall, reaching an estimated speed of 115 miles per hour (185 km/h). However, the airbag split on impact, and Bakunas died of his injuries the next day.

== Filmography ==
| Year | Title | Role | Notes |
|---|---|---|---|
| 1979 | The Warriors | Punk #2 | |
| 1979 | The Apple Dumpling Gang Rides Again | Henchman #1 | |
| 1979 | Steel | 2nd Goon | |
| 1980 | The Stunt Man | Eli's Script Clerk | (final film role) |
