= Fast Charlie... the Moonbeam Rider =

Fast Charlie...the Moonbeam Rider
- Theatrical poster
- Directed by: Steve Carver
- Written by: Ed Spielman; Howard Friedlander
- Screenplay by: Michael Gleason
- Produced by: Roger Corman; Saul Krugman
- Starring: David Carradine; Brenda Vaccaro; L. Q. Jones; R. G. Armstrong; Terry Kiser; Jesse Vint; Noble Willingham; Ralph James; Bill Bartman; David Hayward II
- Cinematography: William Birch
- Edited by: Eric Orner; Tony Redman
- Music by: Stu Phillips
- Production company: Universal Pictures
- Distributed by: Universal Pictures
- Release date: May 1, 1979
- Running time: 98 minutes
- Country: United States
- Language: English
- Box office: $444,334

Fast Charlie...the Moonbeam Rider is a 1979 comedy film starring David Carradine and Brenda Vaccaro and directed by Steve Carver.

== Plot ==
Charlie Swattle, a laid-back World War I veteran (and possibly a deserter), swindles his way into the First Intercontinental Motorcycle Race and its hefty $5,000 prize, set to start on July the 4th, 1919.

On his way to the big event, by reason, trick, and force, he reunites his crew of fellow veterans who like him well, but don't trust a word he says. He also meets Grace, who outsmarts him and gets the ownership of his Moonbeam Special motorcycle, so Charlie is forced to take her and her young son with him. Romance ensues, complicated because she doesn't tell the whole truth and he lies all the time.

At the race, Charlie must face the dangers of the road, cutthroat competitors, and the owner of a motorcycle company who will do absolutely anything for his team to win, including offering him a substantial bribe.

So, Charlie is faced with a choice: will he be a small-time crook, a big-time crook, or a real winner?

== Cast ==
- David Carradine as Charlie Swattle
- Brenda Vaccaro as Grace Wolf
- L. Q. Jones as Floyd
- R. G. Armstrong as Al Barber
- Terry Kiser as Lester Neal
- Jesse Vint as Calvin Hawk
- Noble Willingham as Pop Bauer
- Ralph James as Bill Bartman
- Bill Bartman as Young Man
- David Hayward II as "Cannonball" McCall
- Whit Clay as Wesley Wolf
- Jack Hunsucker as The Mechanic

== Production ==
The film was originally written for Steve McQueen.

Vaccaro was forced to make the movie under her contract with Universal. "I never would have done it otherwise," she said although she later said doing the movie was "great fun".

Filming took place in July and August 1977 in Oklahoma. (Note: David Carradine's version of the filming: "Steve Carver, the director, turned out to be a really funny guy. Right off, he took me aside and said, "David, the crew always works better if they think the director and the star like each other, so do me a favor. Pretend you like me." I did that, and pretty soon I discovered I really did like him. There are some hairy stories to be told about Moonbeam Rider. I had a few close encounters on that antique motorcycle, most notable being the "David as a ball of fire" incident and the time I got run over by an airplane. The plane was supposed to come close, but there were tire tracks on my helmet. I have witnesses. There was one time when I missed a turn on a gravel road and disappeared into the wilderness on the bike, totally out of control, bouncing over rocks the size of coffee tables. No one expected me to walk out of that one. When I did, Jesse Vint told me that what he had been doing while I was missing was thinking about what he was going to say to the press as the last person to see David Carradine alive.") The movie was shot before Deathsport, also for New World Pictures, but released afterwards.

== Release ==
The film had a short drive-in run in the United States, starting on May 4, 1979, and afterward it was broadcast on public and cable television. The film also had releases in Brazil, Sweden, Finland and Portugal between August 1979 to October 1980, and later in video form in Germany, Portugal, Finland, etc.

== Reception ==
Writer and filmmaker Peter Hanson wrote: "The character arc is predictable, and so is the outcome of the cross-country road race that gives the story its structure. Nonetheless, the film’s creative team (...) keeps things lively with an eventful narrative and flashes of colorful dialogue."

Senior Critic from Geek Vibes Nation Dillon Gonzales wrote: "Fast Charlie… The Moonbeam Rider is a bit of a shaggy dog of a feature, but it has its fair share of charm to win you over in the end. David Carradine is a dynamic leading man with his wit and charm, but it is Brenda Vaccaro who ends up elevating the emotional and human elements of the story. A better balance could have been found between the interpersonal drama and the motorcycle exploits, but the film rarely leaves you feeling bored.

Award-winning playwright, screenwriter, and film journalist Frank J. Avella wrote: "But the heart of this darkish comedy is Charlie's journey towards redemption and it's a mostly engaging one with a trio of terrific character actors (L.Q. Jones, R.G. Armstrong, Terry Kiser) providing support and Vaccaro excelling in the early part of the film (...) Carradine's performance is a delight and rather subversive. It's reminiscent of his own troubled film, "Americana" (...) Charlie is a deserter and a grifter, yet we sympathize with him. And a great deal of that is due to Carradine's onscreen charm."

== Home media ==
The film was first released on VHS in the late 1980s. In 2022 was remastered and released in DVD and Blu-ray format by Kino Lorber, including audio commentary by film historian Eddy Von Mueller, theatrical trailer (newly mastered in 2K), and optional English subtitles.
