= Weekend at Bernie's =

1989 comedy film directed by Ted Kotcheff

- Video release poster
- Directed by: Ted Kotcheff
- Written by: Robert Klane
- Produced by: Victor Drai
- Starring: Andrew McCarthy; Jonathan Silverman; Catherine Mary Stewart; Terry Kiser
- Cinematography: François Protat
- Edited by: Joan E. Chapman
- Music by: Andy Summers
- Production companies: Gladden Entertainment; Victor Drai Productions
- Distributed by: 20th Century Fox
- Release date: July 5, 1989
- Running time: 97 minutes
- Country: United States
- Language: English
- Budget: $15 million
- Box office: $30.2 million

Weekend at Bernie's is a 1989 American dark comedy film directed by Ted Kotcheff, written by Robert Klane, and starring Andrew McCarthy, Jonathan Silverman, Catherine Mary Stewart, and Terry Kiser.

The movie tells the story of two young insurance corporation employees who discover that their boss, Bernie, is dead after arriving at his house in The Hamptons. While attempting to convince people that Bernie is still alive until they can leave, to prevent themselves from being falsely suspected of causing his death, they discover that Bernie has ordered their killing to cover up his embezzlement.

Weekend at Bernie's was released on July 5, 1989, and grossed $30 million on a $15 million budget. The film's success despite the mixed reviews inspired the sequel, Weekend at Bernie's II, released in 1993.

== Plot ==
Larry Wilson and Richard Parker are two low-level financial employees at an insurance company in New York City. While reviewing actuarial reports, Richard discovers a series of payments made for the same death. He and Larry take their findings to the CEO, the wealthy and hedonistic Bernie Lomax, who commends them for discovering the insurance fraud and invites them to his beach house in The Hamptons for the Labor Day weekend. Unbeknownst to the pair, Bernie is behind the fraud. Nervously meeting with his mob partner, Vito, Bernie asks to have the two killed to cover up the discovery. After Bernie leaves, Vito instead orders that Bernie be killed for becoming careless with his fraud, and also because Vito's girlfriend Tina is having an affair with Bernie.

Bernie arrives before the pair and plans the murders with hitman Paulie on the phone, accidentally recording the conversation on his answering machine. Paulie arrives and kills Bernie with a lethal heroin injection, then stages it as a self-inflicted accidental drug overdose.

Larry and Richard arrive and find Bernie's body. Before they can call the authorities, guests arrive for a party that Bernie usually hosts every weekend. To the pair's amazement, the guests are too busy partying to notice he is dead, with his dopey grin from the injection and sunglasses concealing his lifeless state. Fearing being implicated in Bernie's death and wanting to enjoy the luxurious house for the weekend, Larry proposes that he and Richard maintain the illusion that Bernie is still alive, which Richard finds absurd. He changes his mind when Gwen Saunders, a summer intern for the company with whom he has a flirtatious relationship, arrives.

After the party, a drunken Tina arrives at the house and demands that the pair direct her to Bernie. However, she also fails to realize the situation and has sex with his corpse. One of Vito's mobsters witnesses this and, mistakenly thinking Bernie's assassination failed, notifies Vito, who sends Paulie back.

The following day, Richard is appalled to discover Larry wearing Bernie's Rolex, and furthering the illusion by puppeteering Bernie's limbs. He attempts to call the police but activates the phone message detailing Bernie's plot against them instead. Unaware of how Bernie died, they mistakenly believe they are still the targets of a mob hit and, as Bernie had said not to kill them while he was in the area, decide to use Bernie's corpse as a shield. All of their attempts to leave the island are thwarted, as they repeatedly misplace and recover Bernie's body, and eventually are forced to return to Bernie's home. Meanwhile, while they are not looking, Paulie makes numerous other assassination attempts and grows unhinged at his repeated "failures".

Gwen, who has been trying to talk to Bernie, observes Larry and Richard with the body, thus forcing them to reveal his death to her. Paulie then arrives and repeatedly shoots the corpse before turning his attention to Larry, Richard, and Gwen. Chasing after them, Paulie corners Larry, who subdues him.

The police arrive and arrest Paulie, taking him away in a straitjacket as he continues to insist Bernie is still alive. Gwen invites Richard to stay with her family for the week while Larry decides to go home to give them space. Bernie's body is loaded into an ambulance. However, the gurney rolls away and topples off the boardwalk, dumping the body onto the beach right behind the three, who run away in terror. Afterwards, a young boy who had buried the body in the sand earlier comes along and starts burying it again.

== Cast ==
- Andrew McCarthy as Larry Wilson
- Jonathan Silverman as Richard Parker
- Terry Kiser as Bernie Lomax
- Catherine Mary Stewart as Gwen Saunders
- Don Calfa as Paulie
- Catherine Parks as Tina
- Eloise Broady as Tawny
- Greg Salata as Marty
- Louis Giambalvo as Vito
- Ted Kotcheff as Mr. Parker
- Jason Woliner as Bratty Kid

== Production ==
Jon Cryer was originally cast in the film, but was replaced by Andrew McCarthy. The film was originally titled Heat Wave and was then retitled Hot and Cold. Shooting took place in New York City in August 1988. The Hamptons scenes were filmed at Bald Head Island, North Carolina, Bernie's house was filmed at Fort Fisher, North Carolina, and the ferry scenes were filmed at Wrightsville Beach, North Carolina.

== Reception ==
On the review aggregator website Rotten Tomatoes, 52% of 27 critics' reviews are positive. The website's consensus reads: "Weekend at Bernie's wrings a surprising amount of laughs out of its corpse-driven slapstick premise, but one joke can only carry a film so far." Metacritic, which uses a weighted average, assigned the film a score of 32 out of 100, based on 5 critics, indicating "generally unfavorable" reviews. Audiences surveyed by CinemaScore gave the film a grade of "B" on scale of A+ to F.

Peter Travers of Rolling Stone called the film "tasteless" and "crude" and felt that in the end it was impossible to "drag one tired joke around for nearly two hours. Like Bernie, the movie ends up dead on its feet." Roger Ebert echoed this sentiment, arguing that movies centered on dead bodies are rarely funny. Ebert gave the film 1 out of 4 stars, stating "Weekend at Bernie's makes two mistakes: It gives us a joke that isn't very funny, and it expects the joke to carry an entire movie."

The film grossed $30 million at the box office and was profitable on home video.

The film has remained popular in part because of repeated showings on cable television. People described it as having "aged into something close to respectability". The film's plot has become a metaphor for similar situations in which a person's health or mental condition is hidden by others, such as the health of Joe Biden during his 2024 reelection campaign or Mitch McConnell during June and July 2026.

== Soundtrack ==
The film's closing credits feature the song "Hot and Cold", performed by American singer Jermaine Stewart. It was written by Andy Summers and Winston "Pipe" Matthews, and produced by Richard Rudolph and Michael Sembello. The song was released as a single by Arista in the United States during June 1989 to promote the film.

== Lawsuit ==
On January 24, 2014, director Ted Kotcheff and screenwriter Robert Klane filed a lawsuit against Metro-Goldwyn-Mayer and 20th Century Fox for breach of contract for profits they claimed were due from the film.

== Sequel ==
A sequel titled Weekend at Bernie's II was released in 1993 and was distributed by TriStar Pictures instead of 20th Century Fox with McCarthy, Silverman, and Kiser reprising their roles and joined by Barry Bostwick as internal investigator Arthur Hummel. The sequel was largely panned by movie critics, receiving a Rotten Tomatoes score of 13%.

== See also ==
- The Two Deaths of Quincas Wateryell
- Jaane Bhi Do Yaaro
- Rough Night
- Buddha Mar Gaya
