= Steel (1979 film) =

1979 film by Steve Carver

- Directed by: Steve Carver
- Screenplay by: Leigh Chapman
- Story by: Rob Ewing; Peter S. Davis; William N. Panzer
- Produced by: Peter S. Davis; William N. Panzer
- Starring: Lee Majors; Jennifer O'Neill; Art Carney; George Kennedy
- Cinematography: Roger Shearman
- Edited by: David Blewitt
- Music by: Michel Colombier
- Production company: Davis/Panzer Productions
- Distributed by: World-Northal Corporation (United States); Columbia Pictures (International)
- Release dates: July 16, 1979 (Philippines); November 21, 1980 (United States)
- Running time: 99 minutes
- Country: United States
- Language: English
- Budget: $4.1 million

Steel (also known as Look Down and Die) is a 1979 American drama film directed by Steve Carver and starring Lee Majors, Jennifer O'Neill, Art Carney, and George Kennedy. It was filmed in Lexington, Kentucky, and the surrounding Fayette County.

== Cast ==
- Lee Majors as Mike Catton
- Jennifer O'Neill as Cass Cassidy
- Art Carney as "Pignose" Moran
- Harris Yulin as Eddie Cassidy
- George Kennedy as Lew "Big Lew" Cassidy
- R. G. Armstrong as Kellin
- Redmond Gleeson as Harry
- Terry Kiser as Valentino
- Richard Lynch as Dancer
- Ben Marley as The Kid
- Roger E. Mosley as Lionel
- Albert Salmi as "Tank"
- Robert Tessier as "Cherokee"
- Hunter von Leer as Surfer

== Production ==
The film was shot in Kentucky and at one stage was called Look Down and Die.

On September 21, 1978, stuntman A.J. Bakunas was fatally injured while doubling a fall for George Kennedy's character "Big Lew" Cassidy. Bakunas, who had already filmed a jump from ninth floor of the Kincaid Towers, wanted to surpass fellow stuntman Dar Robinson's then-new world record for highest free-fall (286 feet, 87m), a record Bakunas himself had previously held (230 feet, 70m). Bakunas jumped 323 feet (98m) from the top floor of the building, reaching a speed of 115 miles per hour (185 km/h). However, the landing airbag burst upon impact, and Bakunas died fifteen hours later from damage to his hips, shoulder blades and lungs. Steel was dedicated to Bakunas's memory.

== Release ==
Steel was first released in the Philippines on July 16, 1979, with Columbia Pictures handling international distribution. The studio intended to release the film in the United States in April 1980, but dropped out due to disagreements with producers Peter S. Davis and William N. Panzer over the film's release date. The domestic distribution rights were then picked up by World-Northal Corporation, who released it in the US on November 21, 1980.
