= Bruce Logan (filmmaker) =

American filmmaker (1946–2025)

- Born: May 15, 1946; Bushey Heath, Hertfordshire, England
- Died: April 10, 2025 (aged 78); Los Angeles, California, U.S.
- Occupations: Director, cinematographer, special effects artist
- Notable work: 2001: A Space Odyssey; Star Wars; Tron
- Spouses: Kathryn Fenton (divorced); Margaret Mayer (divorced); Mariana Campos-Logan

Michael Bruce Sinclair Logan (May 15, 1946 – April 10, 2025) was a British-born American filmmaker and special effects artist. His notable works include designing effects for 2001: A Space Odyssey (1968) and Star Wars (1977), and serving as cinematographer on Tron (1982).

He was a member of the Academy of Motion Picture Arts and Sciences, the Directors Guild of America, and the American Society of Cinematographers.

== Early life ==
Logan was born in Bushey Heath, England. His father was a director for the BBC, and his mother was an ambulance driver during the Blitz in World War II. He attended Merchant Taylors' School in Northwood, London. Logan's interest in film began at age 12, when he started making animated films using toy soldiers and cars.

== Career ==
One of Logan's earliest projects was 2001: A Space Odyssey, where he worked under Douglas Trumbull as an animation artist at age 19. He supervised the film's title sequence, the simulated computer screens, and the Jupiter mission scenes. After working as cinematographer on Big Bad Mama (1974) and Jackson County Jail (1976), Logan returned to visual effects with Star Wars, where he designed the explosions for the Death Star, Alderaan, and various starships.

In 1982, Logan was director of photography for Tron, which was one of the first films to use computer-generated imagery. In a 2019 interview, he said of the experience, "I pulled heavily on my experience in animation and visual effects. [...] Without intimate knowledge of the animation process, I wouldn’t have been able to optimize the live-action photography. Ultimately, I was creating a series of graphic images, so I had to completely eliminate motion blur and create infinite depth of field."

He directed Vendetta (1986), co-directed 2012 Image Control Assessment Series Short (2012) with Fred Goodich, and Lost Fare (2018), and was the second unit director for Fear and Loathing in Las Vegas (1998).

== Personal life and death ==
Logan's marriages to Kathryn Fenton and Margaret Mayer ended in divorce. He had two children with Mayer. He later married Mariana Campos-Logan. Logan died in Los Angeles on April 10, 2025, at the age of 78.
