= Circle of Iron =

1978 film by Richard Moore

- Theatrical release poster
- Directed by: Richard Moore
- Screenplay by: Stirling Silliphant; Stanley Mann
- Story by: Bruce Lee; James Coburn; Stirling Silliphant
- Produced by: Sandy Howard; Paul Maslansky
- Starring: David Carradine; Christopher Lee; Jeff Cooper; Roddy McDowall; Eli Wallach
- Cinematography: Ronnie Taylor
- Edited by: Ernest Walter
- Music by: Bruce Smeaton
- Distributed by: AVCO Embassy Pictures
- Release date: May 1, 1978 (Canada)
- Running time: 102 minutes
- Country: United States
- Language: English
- Box office: $2.6 million (est.) or $1 million

Circle of Iron is a 1978 American martial arts fantasy film directed by Richard Moore and co-written by Bruce Lee, who intended to star in the film himself, but he abandoned the project due to frustration with pre-production and friction with co-stars. The film is also known as The Silent Flute, which was the original title of the story conceived by Lee, James Coburn and Stirling Silliphant in 1969. After Lee's death in 1973, Silliphant and Stanley Mann completed the screenplay, and Lee's part was given to Kung Fu television star David Carradine. Filming began on 28 October 1977 and ended on 20 December 1977. Many other well-known character actors also had small roles in the film, including Roddy McDowall, Eli Wallach and Christopher Lee.

== Plot ==
At a martial arts tournament, fighters compete for the right to begin a quest to challenge Zetan, a famous wizard who possesses a special book of enlightenment that is supposed to contain all the world's wisdom. An arrogant barbarian fighter, Cord, defeats every opponent, but he is disqualified for fighting dishonorably. Cord decides to follow the eventual winner, Morthond, hoping that he can lead Cord to Zetan.

While the two fighters are resting, a blind flutist walks by them and into a nearby building. Cord follows the blind man and sees him easily dispatch a gang of thugs who attack him. Impressed by his fighting skills, Cord asks the blind man to be his teacher. The blind man refuses, but Cord follows him anyway. Cord becomes frustrated with the way the blind man teaches his lessons in riddles, after which the blind man disappears.

Cord finds Morthond wounded from the first trial. Morthond asks Cord to help him end his suffering and pursue his quest to find Zetan. Cord does, and he faces a tribe of monkey men whose leader, the Monkeyman, is a great fighter. Cord challenges and eventually overcomes the Monkeyman, who then tells him how to find his second trial.

On the way, Cord encounters a man in a large cauldron of oil who is attempting to dissolve the lower half of his body. The man is hoping to end his sexual urges in order to find enlightenment. He invites Cord to join him in the cauldron, but Cord refuses, and the man warns him that Cord will eventually break his own vow of celibacy.

Cord then comes upon a band of travelers holding a festival. Cord meets with their leader, Chang-Sha, who offers to let Cord have sex with one of his wives, Tara. Cord declines due to his vow and instead challenges Chang-Sha to combat. The contest is set for the following day, as Chang-Sha has already agreed to fight a muscle-bound African warrior. Chang-Sha defeats the African, killing him. During the night, Cord is joined in his tent by Tara and they have sex. Cord, enthralled with her, asks Tara to stay with him forever. The next morning when Cord awakes, he finds that the entire band has left, and that Tara has been crucified, enraging Cord.

Resuming his journey, Cord has a vision of Death, but he dispels the spirit by demonstrating his lack of fear.

While trying to find Chang-Sha, Cord reaches an oasis, where he again meets the blind man. Cord again asks him to be his teacher; the blind man agrees, and they travel together. Encounters with a poor ferryman and his wife, a band of raiders and a spoiled child become opportunities for the blind man to teach an exasperated Cord a few life lessons before they go their separate ways once again.

Cord finally finds Chang-Sha and his band. Cord now holds himself responsible for Tara's death, but he insists on fighting Chang-Sha to learn the location of Zetan. After pummeling each other for several minutes the fight ends in a draw, but Chang-Sha tells Cord how to find Zetan anyway.

Cord reaches the island where Zetan lives. He encounters Zetan and the sect that protects the book of enlightenment. Cord expects to fight, but Zetan explains that Cord has passed the trials and is entitled to read the book. He even asks Cord to replace him as the new keeper of the book. Opening it, Cord finds that the book's pages are simply mirrors. Zetan explains that there is no book of wisdom, and that enlightenment is found only in oneself. Cord walks off laughing, declining to take the frustrated Zetan's place, and leaves the island. Having found a measure of peace in his life, Cord rejoins the blind man who passes on his flute to him, indicating that Cord will now take on the role of teacher.

== Bruce Lee's inspiration ==
Bruce Lee envisioned his film as an entertaining introduction to Eastern philosophy, as well as martial arts. As he wrote in a preface to the script:

The story illustrates a great difference between Oriental and Western thinking. This average Westerner would be intrigued by someone's ability to catch flies with chopsticks, and would probably say that has nothing to do with how good he is in combat. But the Oriental would realize that a man who has attained such complete mastery of an art reveals his presence of mind in every action...True mastery transcends any particular art.

After Lee abandoned the project, the original script was rewritten, replacing some violent scenes with comedic themes.

== Cast ==
- David Carradine as The Blind Man / The Monkeyman / Death / Chang-Sha
- Christopher Lee as Zetan
- Jeff Cooper as Cord
- Roddy McDowall as White Robe
- Eli Wallach as The Man-In-Oil
- Anthony De Longis as Morthond
- Earl Maynard as Black Giant
- Erica Creer as Tara

== Reception ==
=== Box office ===
In the United States, the film earned $1 million in theatrical rentals. This was equivalent to estimated box office gross receipts of approximately $2.6 million.

=== Critical response ===
The film's reception was mostly negative, with critics citing poor acting and martial arts, but it has gained a cult following. It currently holds a 38% "rotten" rating on review aggregate website Rotten Tomatoes, based on seven reviews.

On the occasion of the Blu-ray release, film critic Dave Kehr wrote: "(...) the picture is a mildly enjoyable martial arts fable shot in Israel, where the desert locations give the Eastern philosophizing a discordantly biblical slant. (...) Indifferently directed by the cinematographer Richard Moore (“The Wild Angels”), “Circle of Iron” is no great shakes as a movie but remains a wistful reminder of the modest pleasures (emphasis on modest) of the pre-blockbuster action movie, when budgets were more in line with ambitions."

== Home media ==
The film was released on DVD on September 28, 2004, and on Blu-ray on May 19, 2009, by Blue Underground. Extras include audio commentary with director Richard Moore, and "Playing The Silent Flute: Interview with Star David Carradine." The DVD extras also include "Bruce Lee's The Silent Flute: A History By Davis Miller & Klae Moore," and First Draft Script by Bruce Lee, James Coburn & Stirling Silliphant (DVD-ROM). The Blu-ray extras include interview with co-producer Paul Maslansky, interview with martial arts coordinator Joe Lewis, and audio-interview with co-writer Stirling Silliphant.
