= Big Bad Mama =

1974 film by Steve Carver

- Theatrical release poster by John Solie
- Directed by: Steve Carver
- Written by: William Norton; Frances Doel
- Produced by: Roger Corman
- Starring: Angie Dickinson; William Shatner; Tom Skerritt; Susan Sennett; Robbie Lee
- Cinematography: Bruce Logan
- Edited by: Tina Hirsch
- Music by: David Grisman
- Distributed by: New World Pictures
- Release date: September 19, 1974
- Running time: 83 minutes
- Country: United States
- Language: English
- Budget: $400,000 or $750,000
- Box office: $4 million

Big Bad Mama is a 1974 American action-crime-sexploitation comedy film produced by Roger Corman, starring Angie Dickinson, William Shatner, and Tom Skerritt, with Susan Sennett and Robbie Lee. The film is about a mother, Wilma (played by Dickinson), and her two daughters, Polly (Robbie Lee) and Billie Jean (Susan Sennett), who go on a crime spree. After the mother unexpectedly falls in love with a bank robber it all ends, with tragic consequences. Big Bad Mama became a cult hit and was followed by a sequel, Big Bad Mama II, in 1987.

== Plot ==
In Texas in 1932, after stopping her youngest daughter's wedding, Wilma McClatchie takes over her late lover's bootlegging business, but gets caught while doing the delivery route with her two daughters. After handing over all her money and her ring to the sheriff, they are let go and she begins her crime spree.

While Wilma is at a bank trying to cash a fake check, the bank is held up by Fred Diller and his gang. In the melee, Wilma and her daughters, Polly and Billie Jean, grab some money bags from behind the counter and escape, but not before Diller gets in their automobile and leaves with them. Afterwards, they decide to pair up, and Diller and Wilma also become lovers.

During a subsequent con, Wilma meets the refined yet dishonest gambler William J. Baxter and falls for him. He joins the group and becomes Wilma's lover, much to the chagrin of Diller. The gang proceeds with several more heists, each time getting more money. Eventually, they kidnap the daughter of a millionaire in hopes of getting rich off the ransom.

When the ransom is paid, federal agents who had been tracking them arrive with the police. Baxter is captured, but Wilma, Polly, and Billie Jean escape with the suitcase full of money. Diller stays behind, providing cover with his Tommy gun, and kills Baxter, who had been working as an informant with the agents, before being killed himself. As the three women drive off, Wilma succumbs to the mortal injuries she has sustained in the gunfight.

== Cast ==
- Angie Dickinson as Wilma McClatchie
- Tom Skerritt as Fred Diller
- William Shatner as William J. Baxter
- Robbie Lee as Polly McClatchie
- Susan Sennett as Billie Jean McClatchie
- Noble Willingham as Uncle Barney
- Sally Kirkland as Barney's woman
- Dick Miller as Bonney
- Joan Prather as Jane Kingston
- Royal Dano as Rev. Johnson

== Production ==
The film is a loose follow-up to 1970's Bloody Mama, which starred Shelley Winters in the title role. That film was produced and directed by Roger Corman, who produced Big Bad Mama. Big Bad Mama is not a sequel (as Mama died in the original) or a remake. However, the core themes of a criminally active mother who shoots a tommy gun, has a strong sexual appetite, and is questioningly close to her grown children – two young ladies in this film, four adult men in the previous one – are repeated.

The film features a number of nude scenes by the three principal actresses, several of which are with the two principal actors. According to director Steve Carver, Angie Dickinson allowed the crew to remain on set during the filming of her sex scene with Tom Skerritt, but William Shatner asked for all nonessential crew to be removed during his sex scene with Dickinson.

Much of the bluegrass music for this film was written by David Grisman. It was played by the Great American Music Band, and recorded and mixed by Bill Wolf.

== Home media ==
On December 7, 2010, Shout! Factory released the title on DVD, packaged as a double feature with Big Bad Mama II as part of the Roger Corman's Cult Classics collection.

On March 30, 2016, Shout! Factory released Big Bad Mama on Blu-ray as a solo release. This Blu-ray is a BD/MOD (Blu-ray disc, manufactured on demand) release. It was announced on the Home Theater Forum, UHD Blu-ray/Blu-ray Forum.

== See also ==
- Bloody Mama
- Crazy Mama
