= New World Pictures =

American film production and distribution company (1970–1997)

- Final logo, used from 1984 to 1997
- Type: Public
- Predecessor: The Filmgroup
- Founded: July 8, 1970; 56 years ago
- Founders: Roger Corman; Gene Corman
- Defunct: February 16, 1997; 29 years ago
- Fate: Acquired by News Corporation and folded into Fox Entertainment Group
- Successors: The Walt Disney Company (through 20th Century Studios and BVS Entertainment) (post-1989 films and TV programs only); Shout! Studios (through New Concorde) (1970–1984 films only); Shamrock Holdings (through Lakeshore Entertainment) (1984–1989 films and TV programs only); Fox Corporation (corporate assets only)
- Headquarters: Atlanta, Georgia, United States
- Key people: Robert Rehme (Chairman and CEO, 1983–1989); Ronald Perelman (CEO; 1989–1997)
- Products: Motion pictures; Television production and distribution; Television broadcasting
- Divisions: New World Television; New World Animation

New World Pictures, also known as New World Entertainment, New World Communications Group, Inc. and New World International, was an American independent production, distribution and in its final years, as an autonomous entity, a multimedia company. It was founded on July 8, 1970, by Roger and Gene Corman as New World Pictures, Ltd. as producer and distributor of motion pictures, before eventually expanding into television production in 1984. New World eventually expanded into broadcasting with the acquisition of seven television stations in 1993, with the broadcasting unit expanding through additional purchases made during 1994.

20th Century Fox, then solely owned by News Corporation, controlled by Rupert Murdoch, became a major investor in 1994 and purchased the company outright in 1997; the alliance with Murdoch, specifically through a group affiliation agreement with New World reached between the two companies in May 1994, helped to cement the Fox network as the fourth major U.S. television network.

Although effectively defunct, it continues to exist as holding companies within the Fox Corporation corporate structure along with various regional subsidiaries, e.g., "New World Communications of Tampa".

New World Pictures' co-founder, Gene Corman, died at his home in Beverly Hills, California, on September 28, 2020, at the age of 93. Roger Corman later died at his home in Santa Monica, California, on May 9, 2024, at the age of 98.

== History ==
=== New World Pictures (1970–1987) ===
Founded on July 8, 1970, New World Pictures, Ltd. was co-founded by B-movie director Roger Corman and his brother Gene, following their departure from American International Pictures (AIP). As the last remaining national low-budget film distributor at the time, New World quickly became one of the most successful independent companies in the nation. Corman hoped to continue AIP's formula at New World, making low-budget films by new talent and distributing them internationally. However, it started with only ten domestic offices, and one each in Canada and the United Kingdom; its films were distributed regionally by other companies.

New World initially made exploitation films such as The Student Nurses and other small-scale productions. Corman helped launch the filmmaking careers of Jonathan Demme (Caged Heat, Crazy Mama), Jonathan Kaplan (White Line Fever), Ron Howard (Grand Theft Auto), Paul Bartel (Death Race 2000) and Joe Dante (Piranha), all of whom made some of their early films as interns for the company. New World also released foreign films from acclaimed directors such as Ingmar Bergman (Cries and Whispers, Autumn Sonata), Federico Fellini (Amarcord) and Akira Kurosawa (Dersu Uzala). Corman conceived the distribution of such films to disassociate New World from being an exhibitor of exploitation films. New World would also acquire and re-edit foreign films for American audiences, such as 1973's Nihon Chinbotsu, released in 1975 as Tidal Wave during the height of the disaster film era.

In 1983, Corman sold New World to Larry Kupin, Harry E. Sloan and Larry A. Thompson for $16.5 million; the three new owners decided to take the company public. Corman retained the film library, while New World acquired home video rights to the releases. In 1984, Robert Rehme – who formerly served as CEO of Avco Embassy Pictures and Universal Pictures and had previously worked for New World as its VP of sales in the 1970s – returned to the company as its new CEO. Later that year, Thompson left the company to form his firm. On February 21, 1984, New World Pictures added 3 new pictures to produce a minimum of 14 releases per year, and had plans to start their regional network.

In 1984, the company created three new divisions: New World International, which would handle distribution of New World's productions outside the United States; New World Television, a production unit focusing on television programs (the first television programs produced by the unit were the soap opera Santa Barbara and the made-for-TV movie Playing With Fire); and New World Video, which would handle home video distribution of films produced mainly by New World Pictures. It would eventually see the success of its video division in its first few months of operation.

In 1986, New World acquired the post-production facility Lions Gate Studios for $4.4 million, as well as the Marvel Entertainment Group (MEG), the corporate parent of Marvel Comics from the liquidated Cadence Industries.

=== New World Entertainment (1987–1992) ===
In July 1967, William "Bill" Deneen left Encyclopædia Britannica Films to start up the Learning Corporation of America, a rival company with Columbia Pictures. It would quickly become one of EBF's biggest rivals in the 16mm field. During his past decade with EBF, William Deneen's specialty was geography films. He was the owner of an independent film company since 1950, which was distributing through EBF until they absorbed his company and made him VP. Among his most famous in-depth looks of everyday life overseas were a series on Japan, Hungary and Communism and a trio shot on Samuel Bronston's sets of Fall of the Roman Empire, including Claudius: Boy of Ancient Rome. Despite being made very economically, these were the most expensive-looking school films of the era.

In 1987, New World acquired educational film company Learning Corporation of America and independent film studio Highgate Pictures. By this time New World Pictures changed its name to New World Entertainment to better reflect its range of subsidiaries besides the film studio, including its purchase of Marvel Comics, and partner Harry Sloan said that the name change would have the revised banner "more accurately reflects the business the company is in". Also that year New World almost purchased two toy companies, Kenner Parker Toys and Mattel, but both planned acquisitions never materialized (although Tonka would acquire Kenner in 1987).

Around this time, New World faced a significant financial slump, and the company began restructuring itself. This began with the sale of Marvel Entertainment Group to Andrews Group (run by financier Ronald Perelman) on January 6, 1989; Marvel Productions was excluded from the sale. After a failed bid by Giancarlo Parretti's Pathé Communications, New World was sold to the Andrews Group in April 1989; Perelman indicated that, while New World's television operations would continue, their motion picture and home video activity would be cut back, if not scrapped entirely. The bulk of its film and home video holdings were sold in January 1990 to Trans-Atlantic Pictures, a newly formed production company founded by a consortium of former New World executives (Trans-Atlantic was sold to Lakeshore Entertainment in 1996). Highgate Pictures and Learning Corporation of America were shut down in 1990. On October 7, 1991, New World sold much of its "network" television assets to Sony Pictures Entertainment, who used these assets to relaunch TriStar Television. Some television programs produced by New World such as Santa Barbara and The Wonder Years would remain in production by the company until their cancellations in 1993; New World would not return to producing programs for the major broadcast television networks until early 1995.

=== New World Communications (1992–1997) ===
On February 17, 1993, Perelman purchased a majority stake in SCI Television, taking over control of the company from George Gillett. SCI's stations included CBS affiliates WAGA-TV in Atlanta, WJBK-TV in Detroit, WJW-TV in Cleveland, WITI-TV in Milwaukee; NBC affiliate KNSD in San Diego; and independent WSBK-TV in Boston. The core of the group was the former television properties of Storer Communications, which Gillett bought in 1987 financed through junk bonds that soured after Black Monday, putting him in a 10:1 debt-to-profit ratio. WTVT in Tampa, also affiliated with CBS and owned directly by Gillett, was included. Perelman folded SCI Television into New World Entertainment, forming New World Communications.

In 1993, New World Entertainment purchased ownership stakes in syndication distributor Genesis Entertainment through Four Star Television and made a direct purchase of infomercial production company, Guthy-Renker.

The company agreed to purchase Argyle Television in May 1994 and its four stations: CBS affiliates KTBC-TV in Austin, Texas, and KDFW-TV in Dallas; NBC affiliate WVTM-TV in Birmingham, Alabama; and ABC affiliate KTVI in St. Louis. At the same time, New World acquired four stations owned by Citicasters: ABC affiliates WBRC-TV in Birmingham and WGHP-TV in High Point, North Carolina; NBC affiliate WDAF-TV in Kansas City, Missouri; and CBS affiliate KSAZ-TV in Phoenix. Due to WBRC and WVTM being in the same market, New World opted to placed WBRC and WGHP in a blind trust and sought buyers for both.

==== Affiliation agreement with Fox, acquisition by News Corporation, and transfer to Disney ====
The biggest deal involving New World Communications would aid in changing the face of American broadcasting. In the wake of Fox's landmark $1.58-billion deal with the National Football League (NFL) on December 17, 1993, which awarded it the television rights to the National Football Conference (NFC) beginning with the league's 1994 season, the network began seeking agreements with various station groups such as SF Broadcasting to affiliate with VHF stations that had established histories as affiliates of the Big Three (ABC, CBS and NBC) and therefore had higher value with advertisers (compared to its predominately UHF affiliate body, the vast majority of which were independent stations before joining the network), in an effort to bolster the network's newly acquired package of NFL game telecasts.

Shortly after the Citicasters acquisition announcement, on May 23, 1994, New World Communications and Fox reached a multi-year affiliation agreement in which New World would switch most of its television stations to the network beginning that fall. The deal would include most of the stations that New World was acquiring from Argyle and Citicasters, with all of the affected stations joining Fox after existing affiliation contracts with their then-current network partners concluded. In exchange, Fox parent News Corporation agreed to purchase a 20% interest in New World for $500 million. New World was approached by Fox in part due to the group's expanding presence in several primary and secondary markets of NFC teams. New World, meanwhile, was concerned about the effect that the network's loss of NFC rights to Fox would have on both CBS, which was near the bottom of the network ratings at the time, and on the group's CBS-affiliated stations.

The stations that became Fox affiliates had to acquire or produce additional programming to fill their broadcast days, as Fox programmed significantly fewer hours of network content (prime time programming for two hours on Monday through Saturdays and three hours on Sundays, the Monday through Saturday children's block Fox Kids, and an hour of late night programming on Saturdays) than its three established major network competitors; on top of that, most of the New World stations (with KTVI later becoming the lone exception) declined to carry the Fox Kids block. The time vacated by news programs, daytime shows and children's programs from each station's former network was filled by additional syndicated programming, particularly local newscasts. The deal as a whole (as well as a second affiliation agreement that was struck one month after the New World deal through the purchase of four stations by a joint venture with Savoy Pictures) caused a domino effect that resulted in various individual and group affiliation deals involving all four networks (primarily CBS, Fox, and ABC) affecting television stations in more than 70 media markets; in most of those areas, New World did not own a station.

Three New World stations were excluded from the Fox affiliation deal. In Boston, where New World owned WSBK-TV, Fox was already affiliated with WFXT (channel 25). WVTM was exempted in Birmingham, as, in the summer of 1995, New World sold WBRC and WGHP to Fox Television Stations, with WBRC switching to Fox after its affiliation contract with ABC expired on August 31, 1996. KNSD (also a UHF station) also did not switch as Fox was already affiliated with a VHF station in the San Diego market, Tijuana, Baja California, Mexico-based XETV-TV (channel 6). KNSD and WVTM retained their NBC affiliations, although in 1995, its contract was renewed for 10 years. New World planned to sell all 3 stations as well, to comply with the FCC's 12-station ownership limit. In November 1994, New World sold WSBK-TV to the Paramount Stations Group subsidiary of Viacom for $100 million.

Later that year, Brandon Tartikoff, who helped NBC out of its ratings doldrums in the 1980s in his former role as President of Entertainment at NBC, joined New World Communications in an executive position; concurrently, New World acquired Tartikoff's production company Moving Target Productions. New World also acquired the remaining interest in Genesis Entertainment, which expanded upon New World's production assets into television distribution (Genesis has subsequently renamed New World-Genesis Distribution following the closure of the purchase). After New World took over Moving Target Productions, the production company was renamed to MT2 Services. In 1995, Stone Stanley Productions was signed an exclusive agreement with New World Entertainment. 1995 also saw the acquisitions of Cannell Entertainment and entertainment magazine Premiere.

In May 1996, New World sold WVTM and KNSD to NBC Television Stations for $425 million. On July 17, 1996, Fox parent News Corporation announced it would acquire the remainder of New World Communications for $2.48 billion in stock. When the merger with News Corporation was finalized on January 22, 1997, New World's television production and distribution arms folded into 20th Century Fox Television and 20th Television, respectively and the former New World television stations were transferred into its Fox Television Stations subsidiary, turning the former group's 12 Fox affiliates into owned-and-operated stations of the network, joining WGHP and WBRC. The New World Animation and Marvel Films Animation libraries were acquired by Saban Entertainment and Fox Kids Worldwide (in turn acquired by Disney through its 2001 purchase of Fox Family Worldwide) following News Corporation's acquisition of New World. In an interview with the Los Angeles Times, a New World executive said, "the only thing Murdoch wants is the stations. All the rest of it is baggage that they’ll deal with later.” In this article, it was suggested that the acquisition would lead to heavy job losses for the 300 people working at New World's entertainment division. New World television programs which continued to air following the January 22, 1997 acquisition included Renegade, The Incredible Hulk animated series, Second Noah, Silk Stalkings and Spider-Man: The Animated Series, with these shows ending not long afterwards.

As part of the acquisition of 21st Century Fox by The Walt Disney Company, the New World library was transferred to TFCF America, Inc., a subsidiary of The Walt Disney Company, effective March 20, 2019, while the New World holding companies remained with Fox Corporation.

== Legacy ==
New World is noted for the number of its cult movies it distributed. Filmink have argued "in the history of Hollywood, few studios are as beloved by fans as Corman era New World."

== Former stations ==
- Stations are arranged in alphabetical order by state and city of license.

Stations owned by New World Communications
Media market	State	Station	Purchased	Sold	Notes
Birmingham	Alabama	WBRC-TV	1994	1995	(Note: Placed in a trust and sold to Fox.)
Birmingham	Alabama	WVTM-TV	1995	1996	(Note: Not included in the groupwide affiliation agreement with Fox.)
Phoenix	Arizona	KSAZ-TV	1994	1997	
San Diego	California	KNSD	1993	1996	
Tampa–St. Petersburg	Florida	WTVT	1993	1997	
Atlanta	Georgia	WAGA-TV	1993	1997	
Boston	Massachusetts	WSBK-TV	1993	1995	
Detroit	Michigan	WJBK-TV	1993	1997	
Kansas City	Missouri	WDAF-TV	1994	1997	
St. Louis	Missouri	KTVI	1995	1997	
High Point–Greensboro–Winston-Salem	North Carolina	WGHP-TV	1994	1995	
Cleveland	Ohio	WJW-TV	1993	1997	
Austin	Texas	KTBC-TV	1995	1997	
Austin	Texas	K13VC	1994	1997	
Dallas–Fort Worth	Texas	KDFW-TV	1995	1997	
Dallas–Fort Worth	Texas	KDFI-TV	1995	1997	(Note: Owned by a third party and operated by New World.)
Milwaukee	Wisconsin	WITI-TV	1993	1997	

== Films ==
Release date	Title	Notes
June 1970	Angels Die Hard	First film from New World Pictures
August 1970	The Student Nurses	
1971	Angels Hard as They Come	
1971	Beast of the Yellow Night	
1971	Bury Me an Angel	
1971	Creature with the Blue Hand	
1971	Private Duty Nurses	
1971	Scream of the Demon Lover	
1971	Women in Cages	
April 30, 1971	The Big Doll House	
June 1971	The Velvet Vampire	
October 22, 1971	Lady Frankenstein	
1972	Night Call Nurses	
January 1, 1972	Night of the Cobra Woman	
May 31, 1972	The Final Comedown	
May 1972	The Hot Box	
July 1972	The Big Bird Cage	
October 1972	The Cremators	
November 1972	The Woman Hunt	
December 21, 1972	Cries and Whispers	Academy Award for Best Picture nominee
1973	The Big Bust Out	
1973	Fly Me	
1973	The Young Nurses	
January 1973	Sweet Kill	
February 8, 1973	The Harder They Come	
May 1973	Savage!	
June 1973	Stacey	
June 1973	The Student Teachers	
September 1973	Seven Blows of the Dragon	
December 1, 1973	Fantastic Planet	
1974	Caged Heat	
1974	Candy Stripe Nurses	
1974	Cockfighter	
1974	The Last Days of Man on Earth	
1974	Summer School Teachers	
January 15, 1974	The Arena	
July 8, 1974	Down and Dirty Duck	
September 19, 1974	Amarcord	Academy Award for Best Foreign Language Film winner
September 19, 1974	Big Bad Mama	
October 1974	Tender Loving Care	
1975	Cover Girl Models	
1975	Darktown Strutters	
1975	The Romantic Englishwoman	
January 1975	Street Girls	
April 27, 1975	Death Race 2000	
May 1975	Tidal Wave	Shortened US version of Nihon Chinbotsu, with seven minutes of new footage featuring Lorne Greene.
June 1975	Crazy Mama	
July 7, 1975	T.N.T. Jackson	
October 10, 1975	The Lost Honour of Katharina Blum	
December 22, 1975	The Story of Adele H.	
1976	Foxtrot	
1976	Nashville Girl	
1976	Eaten Alive	
February 1976	Hollywood Boulevard	
April 1976	Eat My Dust!	
April 1976	Jackson County Jail	
July 6, 1976	Cannonball	
July 1976	The Great Texas Dynamite Chase	
October 1, 1976	Small Change	
October 22, 1976	God Told Me To	
November 15, 1976	Lumiere	
1977	Blonde in Black Leather	
1977	Dersu Uzala	Academy Award for Best Foreign Language Film winner
1977	Moonshine County Express	
1977	The Tigress	
April 8, 1977	Rabid	
April 8, 1977	Andy Warhol's Bad	
April 20, 1977	Black Oak Conspiracy	
April 20, 1977	Catastrophe	
April 29, 1977	The Ransom	
May 27, 1977	Too Hot to Handle	
June 18, 1977	Grand Theft Auto	
July 14, 1977	I Never Promised You a Rose Garden	
September 30, 1977	A Little Night Music	
1978	Autumn Sonata	Produced by ITC Entertainment
1978	Blackout	
1978	Jokes My Folks Never Told Me	
February 3, 1978	A Hero Ain't Nothin' but a Sandwich	
March 8, 1978	The Evil	
March 1978	Leopard in the Snow	
April 12, 1978	Deathsport	
August 3, 1978	Piranha	
August 30, 1978	Avalanche	
November 17, 1978	The Bees	
December 2, 1978	Outside Chance	
1979	The Green Room	
1979	Love on the Run	
March 7, 1979	Starcrash	
April 27, 1979	Saint Jack	
June 1, 1979	The Brood	
June 15, 1979	The Kids Are Alright	
June 29, 1979	Up from the Depths	
July 1979	The Lady in Red	
August 24, 1979	Rock 'n' Roll High School	
November 1979	The Prize Fighter	
1980	The Tin Drum	Academy Award for Best Foreign Language Film winner
1980	Breaker Morant	
1980	My American Uncle	
1980	Something Waits in the Dark	
April 17, 1980	The Private Eyes	
May 16, 1980	Humanoids from the Deep	
July 25, 1980	Ruckus	
September 8, 1980	Battle Beyond the Stars	
November 8, 1980	The Georgia Peaches	
November 11, 1980	Shogun Assassin	
1981	Firecracker	
1981	Quartet	
1981	Richard's Things	
June 26, 1981	Screamers	
August 8, 1981	Galaxy Express	Recut of Galaxy Express 999
August 14, 1981	Saturday the 14th	
October 1981	Smokey Bites the Dust	
October 23, 1981	Galaxy of Terror	
1982	Sorceress	
1982	Christiane F.	
1982	Three Brothers	Academy Award for Best Foreign Language Film nominee
1982	The Personals	
1982	Fitzcarraldo	
April 23, 1982	Tag: The Assassination Game	
May 7, 1982	Forbidden World	
May 7, 1982	Paradise	Canada version
May 14, 1982	Battletruck	
September 10, 1982	The Slumber Party Massacre	
October 8, 1982	Murder by Phone	
October 16, 1982	Android	
November 12, 1982	Jimmy the Kid	
November 1982	Time Walker	
1983	Screwballs	
May 1983	Savage Attraction	
July 1983	The Funny Farm	
July 1983	Space Raiders	
September 2, 1983	Deathstalker	
September 2, 1983	Escape 2000	
September 2, 1983	Stryker	
September 16, 1983	Wavelength	
September 23, 1983	Last Plane Out	
November 3, 1983	The Being	
November 4, 1983	The Prey	
November 18, 1983	Cross Country	
1984	The Pit	
January 13, 1984	Covergirl	
January 13, 1984	Angel	
January 27, 1984	Love Letters	
March 9, 1984	Children of the Corn	
April 13, 1984	Suburbia	
April 24, 1984	Hambone and Hillie	
April 27, 1984	They're Playing with Fire	
April 28, 1984	The Initiation	
June 1984	Rare Breed	
August 3, 1984	The Philadelphia Experiment	
August 31, 1984	C.H.U.D.	
August 31, 1984	Highpoint	
September 28, 1984	Body Rock	
October 1984	Bad Manners	also known as Growing Pains
October 19, 1984	Crimes of Passion	
November 16, 1984	Night Patrol	
January 11, 1985	Tuff Turf	
January 11, 1985	Avenging Angel	
January 1985	The Annihilators	
January 1985	The Highest Honor	US distribution only; produced by Southern International Films
February 8, 1985	Lust in the Dust	
March 1, 1985	Certain Fury	
March 15, 1985	Def-Con 4	
April 12, 1985	Fraternity Vacation	
April 12, 1985	Girls Just Want to Have Fun	
May 1985	Out of Control	
May 15, 1985	The Zoo Gang	
June 14, 1985	The Stuff	
June 14, 1985	Warriors of the Wind	1984 recut of Nausicaä of the Valley of the Wind; Nausicaä director Hayao Miyazaki's distaste of the recut is said to have led to Studio Ghibli's stringent "no cuts" policy for international distribution of their works.
August 23, 1985	Godzilla 1985	1985 American re-cut of The Return of Godzilla, originally produced and released by Toho in 1984
September 28, 1985	Steaming	
September 1985	Stand Alone	
October 1985	The Boys Next Door	
November 8, 1985	Transylvania 6-5000	
December 6, 1985	House	
December 27, 1985	Making Contact	
January 10, 1986	Black Moon Rising	
February 1986	The Gladiator	
February 14, 1986	Knights of the City	
March 1986	The Aurora Encounter	
March 14, 1986	Mountaintop Motel Massacre	
April 1986	Star Crystal	
April 18, 1986	Torment	
May 2, 1986	No Retreat, No Surrender	
May 30, 1986	Jake Speed	
June 6, 1986	Not Quite Paradise	US distribution only; produced by Acorn Pictures and Gilead
July 18, 1986	Vamp	
August 22, 1986	Reform School Girls	
August 29, 1986	Code Name: Wild Geese	US distribution only
September 26, 1986	Shadow Play	
October 17, 1986	Dancing in the Dark	Distribution only; produced by Brightstar Films, Film Arts, and Film House Group
October 24, 1986	Soul Man	
December 19, 1986	Miss Mary	
January 9, 1987	Return to Horror High	
January 16, 1987	Wanted: Dead or Alive	
February 20, 1987	Death Before Dishonor	
February 27, 1987	Beyond Therapy	
April 3, 1987	Nice Girls Don't Explode	
May 1, 1987	Creepshow 2	co-production with Laurel Entertainment
May 1987	The Great Land of Small	
August 28, 1987	House II: The Second Story	
September 10, 1987	Hellraiser	US distribution only; produced by Film Futures and distributed by Entertainment Film Distributors in its native UK
October 23, 1987	The Killing Time	
November 20, 1987	Flowers in the Attic	
November 1987	Heart	
December 25, 1987	Pinocchio and the Emperor of the Night	Produced by Filmation
January 22, 1988	The Telephone	
January 1988	Hell Comes to Frogtown	
February 5, 1988	Sister, Sister	
February 5, 1988	Slugs	
April 8, 1988	18 Again!	
April 22, 1988	Return of the Killer Tomatoes	
May 6, 1988	Dead Heat	
May 13, 1988	The Wrong Guys	
September 2, 1988	Freeway	
September 30, 1988	Elvira, Mistress of the Dark	co-production with NBC Productions
November 10, 1988	Angel III: The Final Chapter	
December 23, 1988	Hellbound: Hellraiser II	co-production with Film Futures Troopstar
January 26, 1989	Felix the Cat: The Movie	
January 27, 1989	Pin	distribution only; produced by Image Organization, Lance Entertainment, Malofilm, and Telefilm Canada
March 31, 1989	Heathers	distribution only; produced by Cinemarque Entertainment
April 14, 1989	Under the Boardwalk	
June 1989	Curfew	
February 16, 1990	Revenge	co-production with Rastar; distributed by Columbia Pictures
1990	Checkered Flag	
January 1, 1991	Killer Tomatoes Eat France	
January 11, 1991	Warlock	produced by; distributed by Trimark Pictures
February 1, 1991	Meet the Applegates	
April 25, 1991	The Punisher	distributed in North America by Carolco Television and Live Entertainment
August 25, 1993	Die Watching	Final film from New World Pictures

== Television programs ==
Series
Title	Original run	Network	Notes
Spider-Woman	1979–1980	ABC	co-produced with DePartie-Frelang Enterprises and Marvel Comics Animation
Maximum Security	1984–1985	HBO	co-production with Major H
Santa Barbara	1984–1993	NBC	co-production with Dobson Productions
Crime Story	1986–1988	NBC	co-production with Michael Mann Productions
Sledge Hammer!	1986–1988	ABC	
Rags to Riches	1987–1988	NBC	co-production with Leonard Hill Films
The Bold and the Beautiful	1987–present	CBS	International distributor for the first 9 seasons; produced and currently owned by Bell-Phillip Television Productions Inc.
Mariah	1987	ABC	
Once a Hero	1987	ABC	co-production with Garden Party Productions
Tour of Duty	1987–1990	CBS	co-production with Braun Entertainment Group; Distributed by Sony Pictures Television
The Wonder Years	1988–1993	ABC	co-production with The Black-Marlens Company
Dino-Riders	1988	Syndicated	Distribution only; produced by Marvel Productions
RoboCop	1988	Syndicated	Distribution only; produced by Marvel Productions
Murphy's Law	1988–1989	ABC	co-production with Zev Braun Productions and Michael Gleason Productions
A Fine Romance	1989	ABC	co-production with Phoenix Entertainment Group
The Robert Guillaume Show	1989	ABC	co-production with Guillaume-Margo Productions
Tales from the Crypt	1989–1996	HBO	U.S. distribution only; produced by Tales from the Crypt Holdings; Currently owned by Warner Bros. Television Studios
Rude Dog and the Dweebs	1989	CBS	Distribution only; produced by Marvel Productions and AKOM
Zorro	1990–1993	The Family Channel	co-production with Goodman/Rosen Productions, Ellipse Programme and Zorro Productions, inc. Currently distributed by Sony Pictures Television
Grand Slam	1990	CBS	co-production with Bill Norton Productions
Elvis	1990	ABC	
Bagdad Cafe	1990–1991	CBS	co-production with Mort Lachman and Associates, Zev Braun Pictures and CBS Entertainment Productions; Currently owned by CBS Media Ventures
Top Cops	1990–1993	CBS	Distribution only; produced by Grosso-Jacobson Productions and CBS Entertainment Productions; Currently owned by CBS Media Ventures
Get a Life	1990–1992	Fox	co-production with TriStar Television (season 2)
The Adventures of Mark & Brian	1991–1992	NBC	co-production with Don Mischer Productions and Frontier Pictures for TriStar Television
Silk Stalkings	1991–1999	USA Network	seasons 5–6 only; co-production with Stu Segall Productions and Cannell Entertainment
Charlie Hoover	1991	Fox	co-production with Ian Gurvitz Productions and Brillstein-Grey Entertainment for TriStar Television
The Boys of Twilight	1992	CBS	co-production with Echo Cove Productions for TriStar Television
Renegade	1992–1997	Syndication/USA Network	seasons 3–5 only; co-production with Stu Segall Productions and Cannell Entertainment
Real Stories of the Highway Patrol	1993–1998	Syndicated	seasons 1–4 only; co-production with Leap Off Productions and Mark Massari Productions
Paradise Beach	1993–1994	Syndicated	U.S. distribution only; produced by Village Roadshow Pictures and currently owned by Alcon Entertainment since 2025
Biker Mice from Mars	1993–1996	Syndicated	produced by Marvel Productions/New World Animation, Brentwood Television Funnies, Worldwide Sports & Entertainment, inc. and Philippine Animation Studios
Valley of the Dolls	1994	Syndicated	co-production with Take A Meeting Productions
Fantastic Four	1994–1996	Syndicated	produced by New World Animation, Marvel Films and Wang Film Productions/Philippine Animation Studios
Iron Man	1994–1996	Syndicated	produced by New World Animation, Marvel Films and Rainbow Animation Korea
Spider-Man	1994–1998	Fox	produced by New World Animation, Marvel Films and TMS-Kyokuchi Corporation
The Clinic	1995	Comedy Central	
The Mark Walberg Show	1995–1996	Syndicated	co-production with Four Point Entertainment
Strange Luck	1995–1996	Fox	co-production with MT2 Services and Unreality, Inc.
Weekly World News	1996	USA Network	co-production with American Media, Inc. and MT2 Services
Second Noah	1996–1997	ABC	co-production with Longfeather Entertainment and MT2 Services
Profit	1996	Fox	co-production with Greenwalt/McNamara Productions and Stephen J. Cannell Productions
Big Deal	1996	Fox	co-production with Stone Stanley Productions
The Incredible Hulk	1996–1997	UPN	Distribution only for season 1; produced by New World Animation and Marvel Films/Marvel Studios
Access Hollywood	1996–present	Syndicated	Distribution only for season 1; produced by NBC Studios

Miniseries
Title	Release date	Network	Notes
Sins	February 2–3, 1986	CBS	
Monte Carlo	November 9, 1986	CBS	
Queenie	May 10–11, 1987	ABC	
Echoes in the Darkness	November 1–2, 1987	CBS	
Beryl Markham: A Shadow on the Sun	May 15–17, 1988	CBS	
Voices Within: The Lives of Truddi Chase	May 20–21, 1990	ABC	co-production with ItzBinso Long Productions and P.A. Productions
Stay the Night	April 26–27, 1992	ABC	co-production with Stan Margulies Productions
Judith Krantz's Secrets	July 22–29, 1992	GEMS	co-production with Steve Krantz Productions
Murder in the Heartland	May 3–4, 1993	ABC	co-production with O'Hara-Horowitz Productions
Tom Clancy's Op Center	February 26–27, 1995	NBC	co-production with Jack Ryan Partnership and Moving Target Productions

Movies
Title	Release date	Network	Notes
Playing with Fire	April 14, 1985	NBC	co-production with Zephyr Productions
Easy Prey	October 26, 1986	ABC	
Penalty Phase	November 18, 1986	CBS	
Poker Alice	May 22, 1987	CBS	
After the Promise	October 11, 1987	CBS	
The Incredible Hulk Returns	May 22, 1988	NBC	co-production with Bixby-Brandon Productions
The Secret Life of Kathy McCormick	October 7, 1988	NBC	
Goddess of Love	November 20, 1988	NBC	
The Hijacking of the Achille Lauro	February 13, 1989	NBC	co-production with Spectacor Films and Tamara Asseyev Productions
Original Sin	February 20, 1989	NBC	
Peter Gunn	April 23, 1989	ABC	co-production with The Blake Edwards Company
The Trial of the Incredible Hulk	May 7, 1989	NBC	co-production with Bixby-Brandon Productions
Nick Knight	August 20, 1989	NBC	
False Witness	October 23, 1989	NBC	co-production with Entertainment Professionals and Valente / Kritzer
Little White Lies	November 27, 1989	NBC	co-production with Larry Thompson Organization
The Death of the Incredible Hulk	February 18, 1990	NBC	co-production with B & B Productions
The Bride in Black	October 21, 1990	ABC	co-production with Barry Weitz Films and Street Life Productions
She'll Take Romance	November 25, 1990	ABC	
The Stranger Within	November 27, 1990	CBS	
In Broad Daylight	February 3, 1991	NBC	co-production with Force Ten Productions
Miles from Nowhere	January 7, 1992	CBS	
Moment of Truth: Cradle of Conspiracy	May 2, 1994	NBC	co-production with O'Hara-Horowitz Productions
XXX's & OOO's	June 21, 1994	CBS	co-production with John Wilder Nightwatch and Moving Target Productions
Moment of Truth: A Mother's Deception	October 17, 1994	NBC	co-production with O'Hara-Horowitz Productions
A Child Is Missing	October 1, 1995	CBS	co-production with Moore-Weiss Productions and Cannell Entertainment
The Surrogate	October 22, 1995	ABC	co-production with Moore-Weiss Productions and Cannell Entertainment
Generation X	February 20, 1996	Fox	co-production with MT2 Services, Inc., Marvel Films and Marvel Entertainment Group

Pilots
Title	Release date	Network	Notes
X-Men: Pryde of the X-Men	September 16, 1989	Syndicated	Distribution only; produced by Marvel Productions
Ghost Writer	August 15, 1990	Fox	co-production with Rumar Films; Currently owned by Shamrock Holdings
Power Pack	September 28, 1991	Fox	co-production with Marvel Enterprises and Paragon Entertainment Corporation
Moe's World	July 19, 1992	ABC	co-production for TriStar Television
The Best Defense	June 19, 1995	ABC	

=== Genesis Entertainment ===
- Highway to Heaven (1984–1989)
- Sale of the Century (1985–1986)
- The Judge (1986–1993)
- Tales from the Crypt (1989–1996)
- The Grudge Match (1991–1993)
- Emergency Call (1991–1998)
- Infatuation (1992–1994)
- Juvenile Justice (1994–1995)

=== Storer Broadcasting/Rhodes Productions/Blair Entertainment ===
- The Littlest Hobo (1963–1965)
- It's Your Bet (1971–1973)
- The Hollywood Squares (1971–1981)
- Wait Till Your Father Gets Home (1972–1974)
- High Rollers (1975–1976)
- Mary Hartman, Mary Hartman (1976–1977)
- Second City Television (1976–1984)
- Let's Make a Deal (1980–1981)
- Pitfall (1981–1982)
- Break the Bank (1985–1986)
- Divorce Court (1985–1992)
- Strike it Rich (1986–1987)
- Fan Club (1987–1988)
- Dracula: The Series (1990–1991)
- Stuntmasters (1991–1992)

== See also ==
- List of 20th Television programs
