= Robert Lee Minor =

American stuntman and actor (born 1944)

- Born: January 1, 1944 (age 82); Birmingham, Alabama, U.S.
- Occupations: Stunt performer, television actor
- Years active: 1970–present
- Spouses: Rita Minor (divorced); Yolanda Minor (m. 2010)
- Children: 2

Robert Lee Minor (born January 1, 1944) is an American stunt performer, television and film actor, best known for doubling many African-American celebrities such as: Jim Brown, Fred Williamson, Bernie Mac, Danny Glover, Carl Weathers, Roger E. Mosley and John Amos. Minor was born in Birmingham, Alabama, and made his first television appearance in 1973 on the television program, Search, then appeared in many shows such as: McCloud, Barnaby Jones, The Six Million Dollar Man, Wonder Woman, Eight Is Enough, Magnum, P.I. and Starsky & Hutch among other popular programs.

== Filmography ==
=== Stunt Performing ===
Here is a list of stunt performances Bob Minor has done:

- Beyond the Valley of the Dolls (1970)
- Blacula (1972)
- Hammer (1972)
- Come Back, Charleston Blue (1972)
- Black Gunn (1972)
- Black Caesar (1973)
- Live and Let Die (1973)
- Cleopatra Jones (1973)
- Detroit 9000 (1973)
- That Man Bolt (1973)
- Hell Up in Harlem (1973)
- Three the Hard Way (1974)
- Rollerball (1975) .... Rollerball Team Member (uncredited)
- Bucktown (1975)
- Posse (1993) (as stunt coordinator/Second Unit Director)

=== Actor ===
- The Legend of Nigger Charley (1972) .... Fred
- Sweet Jesus, Preacherman (1973) .... Hotel target (uncredited)
- Coffy (1973) .... Studs
- Scream Blacula Scream (1973) .... Pimp #1
- Detroit 9000 (1973) .... Killer (uncredited)
- Three Tough Guys (1974) .... Hood (uncredited)
- Foxy Brown (1974) .... Oscar
- Black Eye (1974) .... Henchman
- Dirty Mary, Crazy Larry (1974) .... Deputy #5
- The Swinging Cheerleaders (1974) .... Ryan
- Black Samson (1974) .... Samson's Street People
- Carnal Madness (1975) .... Dick Peters
- Switchblade Sisters (1975) .... Parker
- Rollerball (1975) .... Rollerball Team Member (uncredited)
- Hard Times (1975) .... Zack
- Dr. Black, Mr. Hyde (1976) .... Security Guard
- Swashbuckler (1976) .... Pirate (uncredited)
- Drum (1976) .... Cuban Slave
- J. D.'s Revenge (1976) .... Husband
- The Next Man (1976) .... Killer – Bahamas (uncredited)
- Mr. Billion (1977) .... Black Kidnapper
- The Deep (1977) .... Wiley
- The Choirboys (1977) .... Hod carrier 2
- The Driver (1978) .... Green Mask
- Death Dimension (1978) .... Tatoupa
- Norma Rae (1979) .... Lucius White
- Skatetown, U.S.A. (1979)
- Angel City (1980) .... Jabbo
- Escape from New York (1981) .... Duty Sergeant
- Rocky III (1982) .... Challenger #1
- White Dog (1982) .... Joe
- Forced Vengeance (1982) .... LeRoy Nicely
- The Sting II (1983) .... Tony Savitt
- Heart Like a Wheel (1983) .... Ralph, NHRA Official
- Women of San Quentin (1983) .... J.W. Powers
- Commando (1985) .... Private Jackson
- Hamburger: The Motion Picture (1986) .... Officer Rigney
- Bad Guys (1986) .... Biker in Bar (uncredited)
- The Morning After (1986) .... Man
- Project X (1987) .... Air Policeman
- Action Jackson (1988) .... Gamble
- Torch Song Trilogy (1988) .... Gregory
- L.A. Bounty (1989) .... Martin
- Catch Me If You Can (1989) .... Sandman
- Glory (1989) .... Contraband Soldier
- Almost an Angel (1990) .... Joe – Moses Bros. Truck Driver
- Aces: Iron Eagle III (1992) .... Bigman
- Unlawful Entry (1992) .... Detective Murray
- Innocent Blood (1992) .... Bus Driver
- Love Field (1992) .... Barricade Policeman
- Posse (1993) .... Alex
- Extreme Justice (1993) .... Art Blake
- Surviving the Game (1994) .... Security Guard
- Beverly Hills Cop III (1994) .... Security Guard in Printing Room (uncredited)
- Assassins (1995) .... Cop
- Rage (1995) .... Kelly's Man (uncredited)
- The Sunchaser (1996) .... Deputy Lynch
- Judge and Jury (1996) .... Biker #1
- The Replacement Killers (1998) .... Cop Arresting Meg (uncredited)
- The Gingerbread Man (1998) .... Mr. Pitney
- Light It Up (1999) .... Lester's Dad
- Ground Zero (2000) .... Muller
- The Beat (2003) .... Robbery Victim (uncredited)
- Death at a Funeral (2010) .... Edward
