= Black Cobra (film series) =

- Directed by: Stelvio Massi; Edoardo Margheriti; Umberto Lenzi
- Written by: Danilo Massi; Gaetano Russo
- Produced by: Luciano Appignani
- Starring: Fred Williamson
- Cinematography: Stelvio Massi; Guglielmo Mancori; John Wyler
- Edited by: Alessandro Lucidi; Vanio Amici
- Music by: Paolo Rustichelli; Aldo Salvi; Detto Mariano
- Distributed by: L’Immagine S.r.l.
- Release dates: 1987 (1); 1989 (2); 1990 (3); 1991 (4)
- Running time: 359 minutes
- Countries: Italy; United States
- Languages: Italian; English

Black Cobra (Cobra nero in Italy) is an Italian Blaxploitation series of four action films. All of its films are centered on Robert "Bob" Malone (Fred Williamson), a maverick police detective who deals out his own brand of justice.

== Overview ==
The following are plot summaries for the Black Cobra series.

=== Black Cobra ===
The film was released in 1987, directed by Stelvio Massi. When a beautiful photographer (Eva Grimaldi) witnesses a murder committed by the leader (Bruno Bilotta) of a vicious motorcycle gang, it is up to Malone to protect her. The gang tries hard to eliminate the eyewitness, but fails.

The plot and title of the film are derived from the 1986 film Cobra starring Sylvester Stallone.

=== Black Cobra 2 ===
The film was released in 1989, directed by Edoardo Margheriti. Malone finds himself in the Philippines due to a law-enforcement exchange program that his boss ordered. While picking up his luggage at the airport, Malone is pickpocketed. An Interpol agent (Nicholas Hammond) tracks down the thief with Malone, only to find the thief dead. Malone and McCall uncover clues leading to a terrorist who will kill anyone in his way.

=== Black Cobra 3: Manila Connection ===
The film was released in 1990, directed by Edoardo Margheriti. Malone thwarts a grocery store hold-up. He is then called in by Interpol to find the thieves of a vital arms shipment in the Philippines. Once he has tracked them down, Malone mounts an assault on the criminals' jungle fortress.

=== Black Cobra 4: Detective Malone ===
The film was released in 1991, directed by Umberto Lenzi. A gang of Arab terrorists kidnaps a scientific engineer in order to create a device for terrorist purposes. The film was not released in America.
