= Julius Harris =

American actor (1923–2004)

- Harris in Rich Man, Poor Man, 1976
- Born: Julius W. Harris; August 17, 1923; Philadelphia, Pennsylvania, U.S.
- Died: October 17, 2004 (aged 81); Woodland Hills, California, U.S.
- Occupation: Actor
- Years active: 1964–1997
- Known for: Mr. Big – Trouble Man; Tee Hee Johnson – Live and Let Die; Mr. Gibbs – Black Caesar, Hell Up in Harlem; Scatter – Super Fly
- Children: 2

Julius W. Harris (August 17, 1923 – October 17, 2004) was an American actor who appeared in more than 70 movies and numerous television series in a career that spanned four decades. Harris is best known for his roles in 1970s films such as Live and Let Die and the blaxploitation films Super Fly, Black Caesar and Hell Up in Harlem.

== Early life and career ==
Born in Philadelphia, Pennsylvania to a father who was a musician and a mother who had been employed by the Cotton Club in New York City as a dancer, Harris worked as a nurse, and a bouncer in New York City jazz clubs. Before he began his acting career, Harris served as a medic in the U.S. Army during World War II. After hanging out with many struggling actors, he took a dare and auditioned for his first role and was cast as the father in Nothing But a Man, a critically acclaimed 1964 film about black life in the South starring Ivan Dixon and Abbey Lincoln.

Some of his most prominent roles included the villainous, steel-armed Tee Hee in the James Bond film Live and Let Die, Scatter in Super Fly, Bubbletop Woodson in Let's Do It Again, Captain Bollin in Shaft's Big Score, Inspector Daniels in The Taking of Pelham One Two Three, Joseph in Islands in the Stream and Ugandan President Idi Amin in the TV movie Victory at Entebbe.

He also appeared in Trouble Man, King Kong, Black Caesar, Hell Up in Harlem, Friday Foster, Shrunken Heads, Harley Davidson and the Marlboro Man and in guest-starring roles on Sanford and Son, Good Times, and Love Boat among others. Harris was a member of the Negro Ensemble Company in New York City and appeared on Broadway in the Pulitzer Prize-winning play, No Place to Be Somebody.

=== Death ===
Harris died from heart failure on October 17, 2004, while admitted at the Motion Picture and Television Hospital. He was 81. He was cremated and interred in Philadelphia, his place of birth, and was survived by his daughter Kimberly and son Gideon.

== Filmography ==
Film
Year	Title	Role	Notes
1964	Nothing But a Man	Will Anderson	Harris' first movie role
1969	Slaves	Shadrach	
1971	The Plot Against Harry	Big Julie	
1972	Shaft's Big Score	Captain Bollin	
1972	Super Fly	"Scatter"	
1972	Trouble Man	"Mr. Big"	
1973	Black Caesar	Mr. Gibbs	
1973	Live and Let Die	Tee Hee Johnson	
1973	Salty	Clancy Ames	
1973	Hell Up in Harlem	Mr. Gibbs	
1973	Blade	Card Player	
1974	The Taking of Pelham One Two Three	Deputy Chief Inspector Daniels	
1975	Let's Do It Again	"Bubbletop" Woodson	
1975	Friday Foster	"Monk" Riley	
1976	King Kong	Boan	
1977	Islands in the Stream	Joseph	
1977	Alambrista!	2nd Drunk	
1977	Looking for Mr. Goodbar	"Black Cat"	
1979	Delta Fox	"Tiny"	
1980	Gorp	Fred, The Chef	
1980	First Family	Ambassador Longo	
1981	Circle of Power	B.B.	
1981	Full Moon High	Hijacker	Uncredited
1983	Going Berserk	Judge	
1984	The Enchanted	Booker T.	
1985	Crimewave	Hardened Convict, Victor's cellmate	
1986	My Chauffeur	Johnson	Alternative title: My Chauffeur: Licensed to Love
1986	Hollywood Vice Squad	Jesse	
1988	Split Decisions	Tony Leone	
1990	To Sleep with Anger	Herman	
1990	Darkman	Gravedigger	
1990	Prayer of the Rollerboys	"Speedbagger"	
1991	Harley Davidson and the Marlboro Man	Old Man Jiles	
1993	Maniac Cop III: Badge of Silence	Houngan Malfaiteur	Alternative titles: Maniac Cop 3 MC3: Maniac Cop 3
1994	Shrunken Heads	Aristide Sumatra	
Television
Year	Title	Role	Notes
1969	N.Y.P.D.	Hector	1 episode
1973	The Bob Newhart Show	Mr. Billings	1 episode ("Blues for Mr. Borden")
1975	Harry O	Arthur "Art Sully" Daniels	1 episode
1975	Cannon	Milner, Liquid Store Owner	1 episode
1975	Ellery Queen	Doyle, The Butler	1 episode
1976	Rich Man, Poor Man	Augie	Miniseries
1976	Victory at Entebbe	President Idi Amin	Television movie
1976	Good Times	Ben	1 episode
1977	Kojak	Joe Addison	1 episode
1977	Sanford and Son	Doctor	1 episode
1978	The Hardy Boys/Nancy Drew Mysteries	Mr. Dove	2 episodes
1979	The Incredible Hulk	"Doc" Alden	1 episode
1981	Thornwell	Frisco	Television movie
1982	The Blue and the Gray	Swamp Preacher	Miniseries
1982	Voyagers!	Auctioneer	1 episode
1983	St. Elsewhere	Earl	1 episode
1983–1986	Cagney & Lacey	Bardo / Sergeant Major Brennan	2 episodes
1984	Hart to Hart	Krohn	1 episode
1984	Gone Are the Dayes	Man #1	Television movie
1984	Benson	Benson's Uncle Buster	1 episode ("The Reunion")
1984	The Jeffersons	Reverend Taylor	1 episode
1985	Hollywood Wives	Reverend Daniel	Miniseries
1985	Amazing Stories	Joe	1 episode
1986	Capitol	Papa Nebo	Unknown episodes
1987	Outlaws	Butch	1 episode
1987	A Gathering of Old Men	Coot	Television movie Alternative title: Murder on the Bayou
1989	Friday the 13th: The Series	Simpson	1 episode
1991	The Golden Girls	Mr. Lewis	1 episode
1991	Murder, She Wrote	Jack Lee Johnson	1 episode
1991	Civil Wars	Judge Adams	1 episode
1992	Eerie, Indiana	Prop Man	1 episode
1997	ER	Gramps	1 episode (final appearance)
