= The Soul of Nigger Charley =

1973 film

- Directed by: Larry Spangler
- Written by: Larry Spangler (story); Harold Stone
- Produced by: Larry Spangler
- Starring: Fred Williamson; D'Urville Martin; Denise Nicholas; Pedro Armendáriz Jr. Kirk Calloway
- Cinematography: Richard C. Glouner
- Edited by: Howard Kuperman
- Music by: Don Costa
- Distributed by: Paramount Pictures
- Release date: May 16, 1973
- Running time: 109 minutes
- Country: United States
- Language: English

The Soul of Nigger Charley is a 1973 American blaxploitation Western film directed by Larry Spangler and starring Fred Williamson. It is the sequel to 1972's The Legend of Nigger Charley. Lou Rawls provided two songs for the soundtrack, Sometime Day and Morning Comes Around. For years, only a bootleg copy of poor quality was available until it was released in Blu-ray in early 2025.

== Plot ==
The Soul of Nigger Charley continues the story of escaped slave Charley and fellow ex-slave Toby. This time, the two friends help a group of ex-slaves earn freedom as they combat a ruthless ex-Civil War officer who wants to keep slavery alive by selling blacks to Southern plantation owners in Mexico.

== Cast ==
- Fred Williamson as Charley
- D'Urville Martin as Toby
- Denise Nicholas as Elena
- Pedro Armendáriz Jr. as Sandoval (credited as Pedro Armendariz Jr.)
- Kirk Calloway as Marcellus
- George Allen as Ode
- Kevin Hagen as Colonel Blanchard
- Michael Cameron as Sergeant Foss
- Johnny Greenwood as Roy
- James Garbo as Collins
- Nai Bonet as Anita
- Bob Minor as Fred
- Fred Lerner as Woods
- Joe Henderson as Lee
- Richard Farnsworth as Walker (credited as Dick Farnsworth)
