= Bob Minor =

Bob Minor may refer to:

- Plain bob minor, a course of bell change ringing; see Change ringing#Plain Bob
- Robert Lee Minor (born 1944), American stunt performer
