= Sheba, Baby =

1975 blaxploitation action film directed by William Girdler

- Theatrical release poster
- Directed by: William Girdler
- Written by: William Girdler; David Sheldon
- Produced by: David Sheldon
- Starring: Pam Grier; Austin Stoker
- Cinematography: William Asman
- Edited by: Henry Asman; Jack Davies
- Music by: Monk Higgins
- Distributed by: American International Pictures
- Release date: March 26, 1975
- Running time: 90 minutes
- Country: United States
- Language: English
- Box office: $6 million

Sheba, Baby is a 1975 American blaxploitation action film directed by William Girdler and starring Pam Grier and Austin Stoker.

== Plot ==
Private investigator Sheba Shayne (Grier) returns from Chicago, Illinois to her hometown of Louisville, Kentucky, to confront thugs who are trying to intimidate her father Andy into dissolving or handing over his family insurance company business. Sheba teams up with her father's partner, Brick Williams, and the two rekindle their old romance. Driving in her father's car, Sheba is nearly killed when the vehicle explodes. The local police warn Sheba against continuing to pursue her investigation, but she persists.

Later, four gangsters show up at Andy's office and open fire. Sheba kills three of them, but Andy is shot and killed during the battle. Sheba's investigation leads to an apartment complex, where another shootout ensues. After a chase into a nearby amusement park, Sheba extracts a confession from a gangster named Pilot that the local gang is controlled by an insurance salesman called Shark Merrill.

Sheba joins a party aboard Shark's yacht, but is identified and captured. After the gang does away with Pilot by tying him to a speedboat and dragging him through the water at high speed, they attempt to do the same to Sheba, but she escapes using a knife she had hidden in her wet suit to cut the rope. As Brick leads the police to the yacht and another gun battle breaks out, Shark tries to escape in a speedboat, but Sheba gives chase on a jet ski and kills him with a spear gun. Brick urges Sheba to continue their relationship, but Sheba insists on returning to Chicago, though she promises to return to see him again, since they are now business partners.

== Cast ==
- Pam Grier as Sheba Shayne
- Austin Stoker as "Brick" Williams
- D'Urville Martin as Pilot
- Rudy Challenger as Andy Shayne
- Dick Merrifield as "Shark" Merrill
- Christipher Joy as Walker
- Charles Kissinger as Phil
- Charles Broaddus as Hammerhead
- Maurice Downs (credited as Maurice Downes) as Killer
- Ernest Cooley as Whale
- Edward Reece Jr. (credited as Edward Reece) as Racker
- William Foster Jr. as Waldo

== Reception ==
Roger Ebert gave the film 1.5 stars out of 4, praising Grier's performance but saying the overall film was predictable and in "the passable category" and expressing a wish to see Grier's talents "used in a better-directed film with more ambition." Vincent Canby of The New York Times called the film "a moderately entertaining B picture in the mode of 'Foxy Brown' and 'Coffy,' though somewhat less violent." Variety wrote, "Once you get past Grier's dazzling looks — and with coiffed hair, she looks better here than ever before — this is a flat suspenser kept unexciting by plodding pacing and poorly-shot action sequences." Gene Siskel of the Chicago Tribune gave the film 1 star out of 4 and wrote, "The sound track occasionally misses lips, the dialog always is stilted, and the fight scenes look as tho they've been choreographed at half speed." Linda Gross of the Los Angeles Times wrote, "'Sheba, Baby' is a routine adventure story but thankfully the racism and violence are minimal. William Girdler's direction is listless and lethargic and there is an embarrassing lack of electricity between Miss Grier and Stoker."

On the review aggregator website Rotten Tomatoes, 28% of 25 critics' reviews are positive. The website's consensus reads: "Sheba, Baby is a misguided and unoriginal private eye flick brought down by weak writing and an overly sanitized approach."

== Soundtrack ==
Barbara Mason sang vocals on the tracks "Sheba Baby," "I'm In Love With You," "A Good Man Is Gone," and "She Did It" on the soundtrack for the film.

== Releases ==
Arrow Films released a restored Blu-ray edition of the film in 2016, which includes a new documentary ("Pam Grier: The AIP Years") and two audio commentaries.

== See also ==
- List of American films of 1975
- List of blaxploitation films

== Sources ==
Bogle, Donald. Blacks in American Films and Television: An Illustrated Encyclopedia. New York: Simon and Schuster, 1989. p. 187
