= Mel Stewart =

American actor (1929–2002)

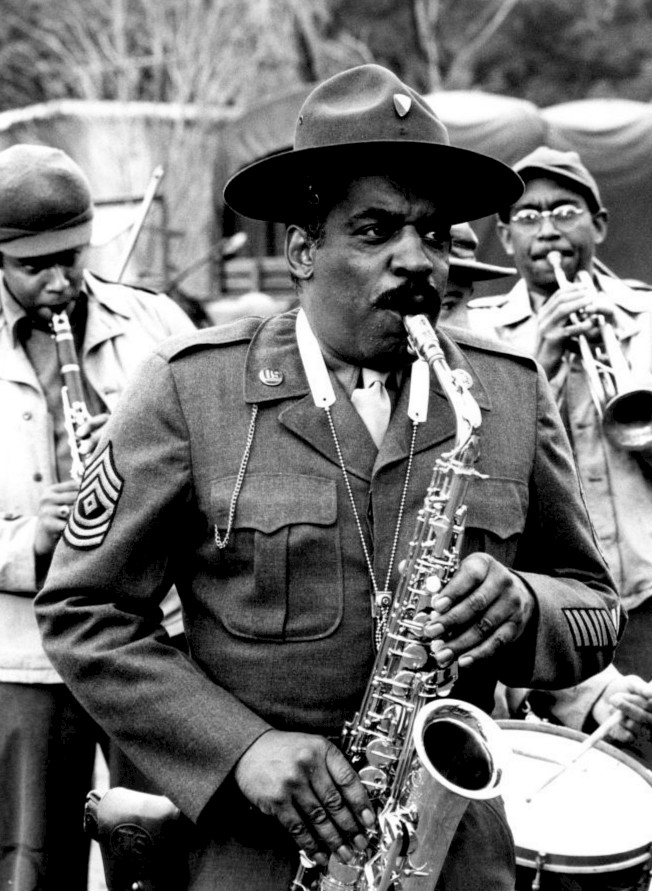
- Stewart as First Sergeant Bryant in Roll Out, 1973.
- Born: Milton Stewart; September 19, 1929; Cleveland, Ohio, U.S.
- Died: February 24, 2002 (aged 72); Pacifica, California, U.S.
- Other names: Melvin Stewart; Melvin Stuart
- Occupations: Actor; director; musician
- Years active: 1959–1993
- Spouse: Annie Dong (m. 1976–2002)

Milton "Mel" Stewart (September 19, 1929 – February 24, 2002) was an American character actor, television director and musician who appeared in numerous films and television shows from the 1960s to the 1990s. He is perhaps best known for playing Henry Jefferson on All in the Family and section chief Billy Melrose on the television series Scarecrow and Mrs. King. Stewart is sometimes credited as Melvin Stewart or Mel Stuart.

== Career ==
Stewart began his acting career in 1959 with small roles on television and in films. In the early 1960s, he appeared in the Broadway shows Purlie Victorious, The Hostage, The Cool World and Simply Heavenly.

Stewart's early career also included notable work as a voice actor. He provided the narration for "Scenes in the City", a long jazz composition with text by Lonne Elder and Langston Hughes that appeared on Charles Mingus' 1957 album A Modern Jazz Symposium of Music and Poetry. In 1961, Stewart recorded an album of Langston Hughes' poetry on Folkways Records titled Langston Hughes' The Best of Simple. He was also a member of the San Francisco-based improv group The Committee, with whom he performed on The Dick Cavett Show in 1969. That same year, Stewart was part of the cast of Turn-On, which notoriously ended after one episode.

Stewart played roles in various television series including That Girl, Marcus Welby, M.D., The Bob Newhart Show, Good Times and Harry O. One of his most memorable roles was as Henry Jefferson, George Jefferson's brother, in three seasons of the series All in the Family. In 1973, he co-starred in the short-lived series Roll Out. The following year, Stewart directed two episodes of the short-lived series Get Christie Love! (which starred fellow Turn-On cast member Teresa Graves) and costarred in On the Rocks. After that series was canceled in 1976, Stewart portrayed Marvin Decker in the Bewitched spinoff series Tabitha from 1977 to 1978.

Stewart starred on Scarecrow and Mrs. King as section chief Billy Melrose during the show's four-year run from 1983 through 1987, and continued guest-starring in both television and films. His last on-screen appearance came in the 1993 film Made in America.

== Side projects ==
In addition to acting and directing, Stewart was an accomplished jazz saxophonist. A longtime resident of San Francisco, he also taught acting at San Francisco State University. His students included actor Danny Glover.

He established the theater group Black Actors Now Through Unity (BANTU) and directed plays at the Center for African and African-American Art and Culture in San Francisco and the Black Repertory Theater in Berkeley, California.

A third degree black belt in aikido, Stewart opened a dojo for inner-city youth in the Bayview district of San Francisco.

== Personal life and death ==
On July 11, 1976, Stewart married Annie Dong. The couple had one child together, a daughter. On February 24, 2002, Stewart died of Alzheimer's disease.

== Filmography ==
Film
Year	Title	Role	Notes
1959	Odds Against Tomorrow	Hotel Juno Elevator Operator	Uncredited
1959	Shadows	Man at Party	Uncredited
1963	Greenwich Village Story	Alex	
1963	The Cool World	Con-man	
1964	Nothing but a Man	Riddick	
1967	Funnyman	Phil	
1967	Petulia	Supermarket Clerk	Uncredited
1970	The Landlord	Professor Duboise	Credited as Melvin Stewart
1971	Cry Uncle!	Lt. Fowler	Alternative titles: American Oddballs; Super Dick; Credited as Melvin Stewart
1972	Hammer	Professor	Alternative title: BJ Hammer
1972	Trick Baby	Blue Howard	
1973	Steelyard Blues	Black Man in Jail	Alternative title: The Final Crash
1973	Scorpio	Pick	
1973	Kid Blue	Blackman	
1973	Blood, Black and White		
1974	Newman's Law	Quist	
1975	Let's Do It Again	Ellison	
1981	Whose Life Is It Anyway?	Dr. Barr	
1988	Dead Heat	Captain Mayberry	
1989	Martians Go Home	Judge	
1989	Bride of Re-Animator	Dr. Graves	Alternative title: Re-Animator 2
1993	Made in America	Principal Rockwell	(final film role)

Television
Year	Title	Role	Notes
1962	Car 54, Where Are You?	Officer	Episode: "That's Show Business"; Uncredited
1963	Naked City	Pharmacist	Episode: "Barefoot on a Bed of Coals"; Uncredited
1964	The Nurses	Grand Jury Foreman	Episode: "The Love of a Smart Operator"
1969	The Smothers Brothers Comedy Hour	Mr. Harris	Episode #1.1
1969	Turn-On	Various characters	2 episodes
1971–1973	All in the Family	Henry Jefferson	8 episodes
1972	The Bold Ones: The Senator	Dawson	Episode: "A Single Blow of a Sword"
1973	The Bob Newhart Show	Mr. Dabney	Episode: "Not With My Sister You Don't"
1974	Toma	George Sawtelle	Episode: "A Funeral for Max Berlin"
1974	Lucas Tanner	Mr. Browder	Episode: "Look the Other Way"
1975	On the Rocks	Mr. Gibson	Series regular
1975	The Rockford Files	Police Lieutenant	Episode: "Charlie Harris at Large"
1975	That's My Mama	Laforche	Episode: "Business Is Business"
1977	What's Happening!!	Spike Gibbs	Episode: "The Hospital Stay"
1977	Sanford and Son	Clarence	Episode: "Fred the Activist"
1979	Roots: The Next Generations	Dr. Crawford	Miniseries
1979	Benson	Loromo	Episode: "The President's Double"
1980	Soap	Walter Coleman	Episode: "3.14
1980	One in a Million	Raymond Simmons	Main cast
1981	Little House: A New Beginning	Hertzell Lundy	Episode: "Make a Joyful Noise"
1981	The Greatest American Hero	Sherman	Episode: "Saturday Night on Sunset Boulevard"
1983–1987	Scarecrow and Mrs. King	Billy Melrose	series regular
1983	The Kid with the 200 I.Q.	Debs	television film
1983	The Invisible Woman	Security Guard	television film
1984	Cheers	Man	Episode: "Coach Buries a Grudge"
1987	Amen	Brother Clark	Episode: "California Dreaming"
1988	Frank's Place	Ben Coleman	Episode: "Cultural Exchange"
1989	227	Jack McGee	Episode: "The Real Decoys"
1989	Matlock	Sgt Lou Marshall	Episodes: "The Mayor: Part 1" "The Mayor: Part 2"
1989	The Golden Girls	Judge	Episode: "Love Under the Big Top"
1990	In the Heat of the Night	Calvin Peterson	Episodes: "Brotherly Love: Part 1" "Brotherly Love: Part 2" "Lessons Learned"
