= Adios Amigo (1976 film) =

1975 film directed by Fred Williamson

- The movie poster for the film Adios Amigo
- Directed by: Fred Williamson
- Written by: Fred Williamson
- Produced by: Fred Williamson
- Starring: Fred Williamson; Richard Pryor; James Brown; Robert Phillips; Mike Henry
- Cinematography: Tony Palmieri
- Edited by: Eva Ruggiero; Gene Ruggiero
- Music by: Blue Infernal Machine
- Distributed by: Atlas Films
- Release date: February 11, 1976
- Running time: 87 minutes
- Country: United States
- Language: English

Adios Amigo is a 1976 American Western comedy film written, produced and directed by Fred Williamson, who also stars in the lead role. The film co-stars Richard Pryor and James Brown.

== Premise ==
A frontier con man tries scams that never work, leaving his partner behind to explain.

== Cast ==
- Fred Williamson as Ben "Big Ben"
- Richard Pryor as Sam Spade
- James Brown as Sheriff
- Robert Phillips as Notary
- Mike Henry as Mary's Husband

== Production ==
The idea for the project came from Pryor's initial frustration of being rejected from starring in Mel Brooks's Blazing Saddles after collaborating with him on the screenplay, and Williamson's dislike of the finished film, which he considered silly. The goal was to make a comedy that would still be realistic to its Western setting, and which would allow Pryor to work without restraint. The initial script was only 12 pages, with Williamson encouraging Pryor to ad-lib scenarios in a suggested scene. Principal photography took only nine days.

== Reception ==
Ultimately, both Williamson and Pryor were disappointed with the results. "I wanted to give him an idea, a concept, and then just turn the light on him and let him do whatever he wanted. You know what they say about comedians – that you can just open the refrigerator door and the light comes on, the jokes roll on out. Well, Richard's light didn't come on," said Williamson. In an interview with Ebony shortly after the movie came out, Pryor said, "Tell them I apologize. Tell them I needed some money. Tell them I promise not to do it again."

Despite the negative opinions of its stars, the film garnered a positive review from Gene Siskel. During a Sneak Previews "Dog of the Week" segment, often devoted to low-budget films cashing in on name star appearances, Siskel mentioned approaching Adios Amigo as a potential "dog" because it didn't sound like a good movie in previews, but found it to be a very funny and enjoyable film that resulted in him stating that he had no "dog" selection after all for that week's show.
