= Death Journey =

1976 film by Fred Williamson

- Directed by: Fred Williamson
- Written by: Abel Joney
- Starring: Fred Williamson
- Cinematography: Robert Caramico
- Edited by: James E. Nownes
- Production company: Po' Boy Productions
- Distributed by: Atlas Films
- Release date: May 26, 1976
- Running time: 78 minutes
- Country: United States
- Language: English
- Budget: $600,000 (estimated)

Death Journey is a 1976 action crime film written by Abel Joney and directed by Fred Williamson, who also stars as Jesse Crowder, an ex-cop located in Los Angeles hired by a D.A in New York to transport a witness testifying against a gangster.

== Plot ==
Witnesses supposed to testify against mobster Jack Rosewald are being killed left and right. Seeing no other options, New York District Attorney Virgil Riley and his assistant Jonas contact the last remaining witness, located in Los Angeles, Finley, to travel to New York. Initially skeptical, Finley agrees after being promised protection. After convincing an initially skeptical Virgil, Jonas decides to call ex-cop Jesse Crowder to transport Finley to New York within 48 hours, and Crowder accepts $25,000 for the job. That night, Rosewald’s girlfriend, Kay travels to California to seduce Crowder and give him a watch, which has a tracker.

The next morning, Crowder and Finley set off to New York, while goons track and try to kill them. During the scuffle, Finley flees, terrified, and hitches a ride. Once Crowder finds Finley, he lectures him about going off on his own. They make it to an airport, but decide it’s too dangerous to fly, so they ride a bus to Kansas City.

At a train station, Crowder encounters a young fashion model, and they take a train to Chicago. After having sex with Crowder, the fashion model is revealed to be a hitwoman. The woman sneaks out of bed, pulls out a switchblade and tries to stab Finley while he’s asleep, but Crowder grabs her from behind, and throws her off the train, killing her. Once they arrive, they go to O’Hare Airport, where Crowder phones Virgil and changes his price to $50,000. They make it to a hotel in New York, where a room service waiter attacks them, but Crowder electrocutes him. Crowder then discovers a tracker in the watch Kay gave to him. Virgil and Jonas take Finley from Crowder, who files back to Los Angeles, tracks down Kay, and returns the watch. As he walks away, he looks back as he hears an explosion, which seemingly kills Kay.

== Cast ==
- Fred Williamson as Jesse Crowder
- Bernard Kuby as Finley
- Art Maier as District Attorney Virgil Riley
- Lou Bedford as Assistant District Attorney Jonas
- Heidi Dobbs as Kay
- Stephanie Faulkner as Hitwoman
- Ed Kovins as Stern, The Mouthpiece
- Patrick McCullough as Jack Rosewald, Gang Leader
- Emil Farkas as Karate Instructor
- June Christopher as Lily
- Paula Sills (uncredited) as Poopsie
- Sam Coppola as Detective Johnson
- Geoffrey Land as Judge
- James B. Campbell as Judge
- D'Urville Martin as Mechanic
- George P. Wilbur as Thug
- Tony Brubaker as Gas Station Attendant
- Jack Oliver as Detective Don
- Alexis Tramunti as Alice
- Jean Dancy as Woman At Gas Station

== Production & Release ==
The film was shot in 6 days in August 1975 on a budget of almost $600,000, filmed in Palm Springs, Apple Valley, Kansas City, St. Louis, Chicago, New York City, and Los Angeles.

The film was released theatrically in the United States on May 26, 1976. The film was eventually released by Code Red on DVD in 2010 and on Blu-ray in 2016.

== Jesse Crowder character ==
The Jesse Crowder character would be used in four films featuring Williamson. He first appeared in Death Journey, then returned in No Way Back. He would be used again in Efren C. Piñon's Blind Rage, which was released in 1978. The character's final appearance was in The Last Fight, which was released in 1983.

According to The Hammer: an American Hero by Harold D. Edmunds, Williamson actually knew a guy in high school called Jesse Crowder. Crowder was a tough no-nonsense guy that nobody messed with. After the name was used in Williamson's films, Crowder took legal action against Williamson. The case went to court and Williamson's lawyer placed some phone books on the table and asked him which Crowder he was. Crowder realized he didn't have anywhere to go with this. In the end Williamson decided to cease using the Crowder character.
