= D'Urville Martin =

American actor and director (1939–1984)

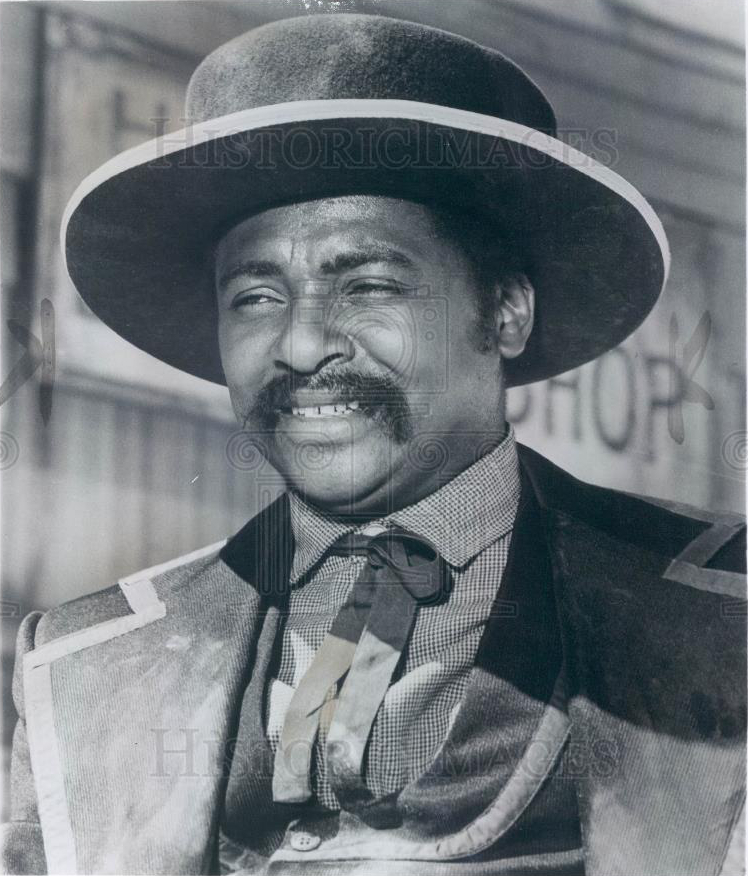
- Martin in 1974
- Born: February 11, 1939; New York City, New York, U.S.
- Died: May 28, 1984 (aged 45); Los Angeles, California, U.S.
- Resting place: Inglewood Park Cemetery, Inglewood, California, U.S.
- Occupations: Actor and director
- Years active: 1964–1984
- Spouses: Frances L. Johnson (divorced) Lillian Ferguson (m. 1966)
- Children: 3

D'Urville Martin (February 11, 1939 – May 28, 1984) was an American actor in both film and television. He appeared in numerous 1970s movies in the blaxploitation genre. He also appeared in two unaired pilots of what would become All in the Family as Lionel Jefferson. Born in New York City, Martin began his career in the mid-1960s and soon appeared in prominent films such as Black Like Me, Guess Who's Coming to Dinner, and Rosemary's Baby. Martin also directed films in his career, including Dolemite, starring Rudy Ray Moore.

== Career ==
Martin's first film role was as a speaking-line extra in Black Like Me (1964). He then had small roles in Guess Who's Coming to Dinner (1967) (as Frankie, whose car is accidentally struck by Spencer Tracy's character Matt Drayton) and Rosemary's Baby (1968) (as Diego, the elevator operator).

Later movies of D'Urville Martin are of the blaxploitation genre, starting with The Legend of Nigger Charley in 1972 and continuing throughout the decade until he appeared in The Bear in 1983, a biopic about Bear Bryant. In The Legend of Nigger Charley, Martin played Toby, a fellow fugitive of the title character. He reprised his role in the film's two sequels: The Soul of Nigger Charley (1973) and Boss Nigger (1975).

He played Sonny in the film Hammer (1972), Reverend Rufus in Black Caesar (1973) and its sequel Hell Up in Harlem (also 1973), and the pimp in The Get-Man (a.k.a. Combat Cops) (1974).

Martin directed the 1975 Rudy Ray Moore movie Dolemite. In addition to directing the film, Martin plays the villain, Willie Green. The movie was followed by a sequel, The Human Tornado, in 1976; Martin did not direct the sequel. In the 2019 film about Moore and the making of Dolemite, Dolemite Is My Name, Martin is played by Wesley Snipes, and is portrayed as a reluctant participant in the film, with his role as director regularly usurped by Moore.

== Personal life and death ==
D'Urville Martin was born in New York City in 1939. He had a daughter, Debra, with his first wife, Frances L. Johnson. After their divorce, he married Lillian Ferguson in 1966 and had two more children. Martin died of a massive heart attack in Los Angeles in 1984 at the age of 45.

== Legacy ==
Directing Dolemite, Martin directed a film that proved to be a good example of the era's blaxploitation movies and to this day remains one of the most popular, still inspiring tributes and spoofs today such as Black Dynamite (2009). Cultural historian Todd Boyd finds that Rudy Ray Moore's depiction of Dolemite is linked to rappers like Snoop Dogg and The Notorious B.I.G., pointing out Moore came up with the pronunciation "Biotch!", which later became ubiquitous. Boyd notes the humor in Moore carrying himself off as a sex symbol "to bed the fine-ass women who can't keep their hands off him.”

== Filmography ==
=== Film ===
Year	Title	Role	Notes
1964	Black Like Me		
1967	Guess Who's Coming to Dinner	Frankie	
1968	Rosemary's Baby	Diego	
1968	A Time to Sing	Luke Harper	
1970	Watermelon Man	Bus Driver	
1972	The Legend of Nigger Charley	Toby	
1972	The Final Comedown	Billy Joe Ashley	
1972	Hammer	Sonny	
1973	Black Caesar	Reverend Rufus	
1973	Book of Numbers	Billy Bowlegs	
1973	The Soul of Nigger Charley	Toby	
1973	Five on the Black Hand Side	Booker T.	
1973	Hell Up in Harlem	Reverend Rufus	
1974	The Get-Man	The Pimp	
1975	Boss Nigger	Amos	
1975	Sheba, Baby	Pilot	
1975	Dolemite	Willie Green	Also directed
1976	Death Journey	Detective Don	
1976	Blind Rage	Willie Black	
1976	Black Samurai		Uncredited
1977	Disco 9000	Stuffman	Also directed and produced
1983	The Big Score	Easy	
1984	The Bear	Billy	Final film role

=== Television ===
Year	Title	Role	Notes
1967	The Monkees	The Champ	Episode: "Monkees in the Ring"
