= Boss Nigger =

1975 Western film

- Theatrical poster
- Directed by: Jack Arnold
- Written by: Fred Williamson
- Produced by: Jack Arnold; Fred Williamson
- Starring: Fred Williamson; D'Urville Martin; R.G. Armstrong; William Smith
- Cinematography: Bob Caramico
- Edited by: Eva Ruggiero; Gene Ruggiero
- Music by: Leon Moore
- Production companies: Jacs Films, Inc. 3P Productions
- Distributed by: Dimension Pictures
- Release date: February 26, 1975
- Running time: 93 minutes
- Country: United States
- Language: English

Boss Nigger (also known as Boss and The Black Bounty Killer) is a 1975 blaxploitation Western film directed by Jack Arnold, starring former football player Fred Williamson, who also wrote and co-produced the film. It is the first film for which Williamson was credited as screenwriter or producer.

== Plot ==
Upon finding a wagon under attack by bandits, two Black bounty hunters, Boss and Amos intervene and save Clara Mae, a Black woman. Upon inspecting the bodies, the bounty hunters find several have rewards to their name and one holds a letter from the mayor of the nearby town San Miguel inviting him to become sheriff on the recommendation of fugitive Jed Clayton. The pair take Clara Mae to safety in San Miguel and meet Mayor Griffin. Knowing that there is no sheriff and holding proof that the mayor intended to give it to a gang member, Boss is able to outsmart the mayor and intimidate other members of the town council into giving him the position. As sheriff, Boss and Amos keep the peace and enforce several "Black Laws" such as issuing fines or periods in jail for calling either of them a "nigger" in public. In his duties Boss meets Miss Pruit, a White schoolteacher, who initially offends Boss by talking of the fond memories she has of her family's Black slaves, but earns his forgiveness and develops a romantic interest in him. When a gang of Jed Clayton's men meet the mayor in the town saloon to extort supplies from the town (an arrangement that the mayor allows on the understanding that the gang will do no harm to the town or its citizens), Boss and Amos kill one gang member and arrest two more - with one prisoner being killed as he attempts to escape town assisted by the mayor.

Jed and his outlaws then attempt to help the imprisoned outlaw escape by blowing a hole in the prison wall using dynamite. During the resulting raid on the town Clara Mae is kidnapped and taken away by Jed's men, while a Mexican child named Poncho (whom Boss had befriended) is killed. Boss attempts to meet Jed and his gang at their hideout but is himself kidnapped, tied to a pole, and tortured. When Jed leaves at night to meet with the mayor, Amos is able to rescue an injured Boss with the help of Clara Mae, taking him to Miss Pruit's house to recover. Knowing that Jed and his men will be riding through town the next day on their supply run, the bounty hunters plan an ambush.

With the help of town residents like the doctor and the blacksmith, Boss and Amos set a trap, planting explosives around town and taking up hidden firing positions. Jed's gang arrives and makes their way to the cantina where Clara Mae lives. After she rejects Jed's advances, he kills her. The gang moves forward into town, only to be ambushed by Boss and Amos. Boss follows Jed into the saloon for a showdown, eventually killing him. Just as Boss steps outside, Mayor Griffin shoots him twice, but Boss manages to fatally retaliate by throwing a knife at him. Severely wounded, Boss begs Amos to not let him die in a "White folks' town." Miss Pruit offers to leave with him, but he refuses. The film ends with Amos and a slumped-over Boss riding out of town, leaving Boss' fate uncertain.

== Production ==
Film critic Dana M. Reemes in his biography Directed by Jack Arnold (1988) notes the technical virtues of this low-budget "B" movie:

In some ways Boss Nigger is an amazing film. It was shot in the western town of J. W. Eve's Movie Ranch in New Mexico on a budget of $200,000. The full-scope Todd-AO 35 photography is good, and the camera movement and staging are excellent. No corners appear to be cut. Jack Arnold's major contribution to this film is that it was made at all; only a director with his experience and efficient technique could have made so much out of so little.

== Critical analysis ==
=== Initial release ===
On its initial release, Vincent Canby of The New York Times described Boss Nigger as "a pleasant surprise if you stumble upon it without warning". Canby characterized Williamson's acting as "an immensely self-assured parody of the Man with No Name played by Clint Eastwood in Sergio Leone's films". Canby concluded his review by highlighting what made Boss Nigger notable among Black Westerns: "Most black Westerns either ignore race or make it the fundamental point of the movie. Boss Nigger somehow manages to do both quite successfully."

=== Later critics ===
In its review of Boss Nigger, written in 2007, Time Out suggested that Williamson was parodying the violent roles he had played in other blaxploitation films. The review noted that Boss Nigger was notable for its "old-fashioned bloodless violence".

Writing in 2006, film critic Ryan Diduck described the marketing of Boss Nigger and other blaxploitation films to Black audiences as an example of "empowerment through an overturned representation of long-established agency limitations for black men". Diduck specifically cited the trailer for Boss Nigger for the manner in which it elicits feelings of Black superiority and White hysteria and encourages the audience to identify with the outsider hero who finds himself at odds with the rules of White America.

Biographer Dana M. Reemes, writing in 1988, commented on the thematic element in Fred Williamson's screenplay:

Jack Arnold seems to have been artiste exécutant on this picture; content-wise, we must regard Fred Williamson as the film's auteur. He is like a black Clint Eastwood in a Cottafavi western. William's bounty hunter turns the table on the town's White establishment with an intelligent and biting wit. He is very popular in the nearby Mexican village and is generous to its inhabitants—a kind of cinematic third-world unity. From an ideological standpoint, it is interesting to note that the only White male who turns out to be worth much is the blacksmith, a simple, honest tradesman.

=== William Smith on Boss Nigger ===
In a 1998 interview, Smith spoke of his experience filming Boss Nigger. Smith, who is White, said that he never felt any racial tension, despite the fact that production took place during the height of the Black Power movement. He went on to describe the making of the film:

I was killed in ... Boss Nigger by Fred Williamson. We had a great time with our fights. We went down to Arizona to film Boss with R.G. Armstrong. He had a lot of urban, black kids on the set. They were falling off their horses like Neville Brand did in Laredo—only they weren't drunk, of course. Fred and I had a great fight scene in that, more than one.

== Release ==
Boss Nigger was released in some areas under the title The Boss or The Black Bounty Killer. In 2008, the film was released on DVD under the alternative title Boss. It was followed by a Blu-ray release in 2018, also bearing the title Boss.

== See also ==
- List of American films of 1975

== Sources ==
- Reemes, Dana M. (1988). Directed by Jack Arnold. Jefferson, North Carolina: McFarland & Company. ISBN 978-0899503318.
