= Don Pedro Colley =

American actor

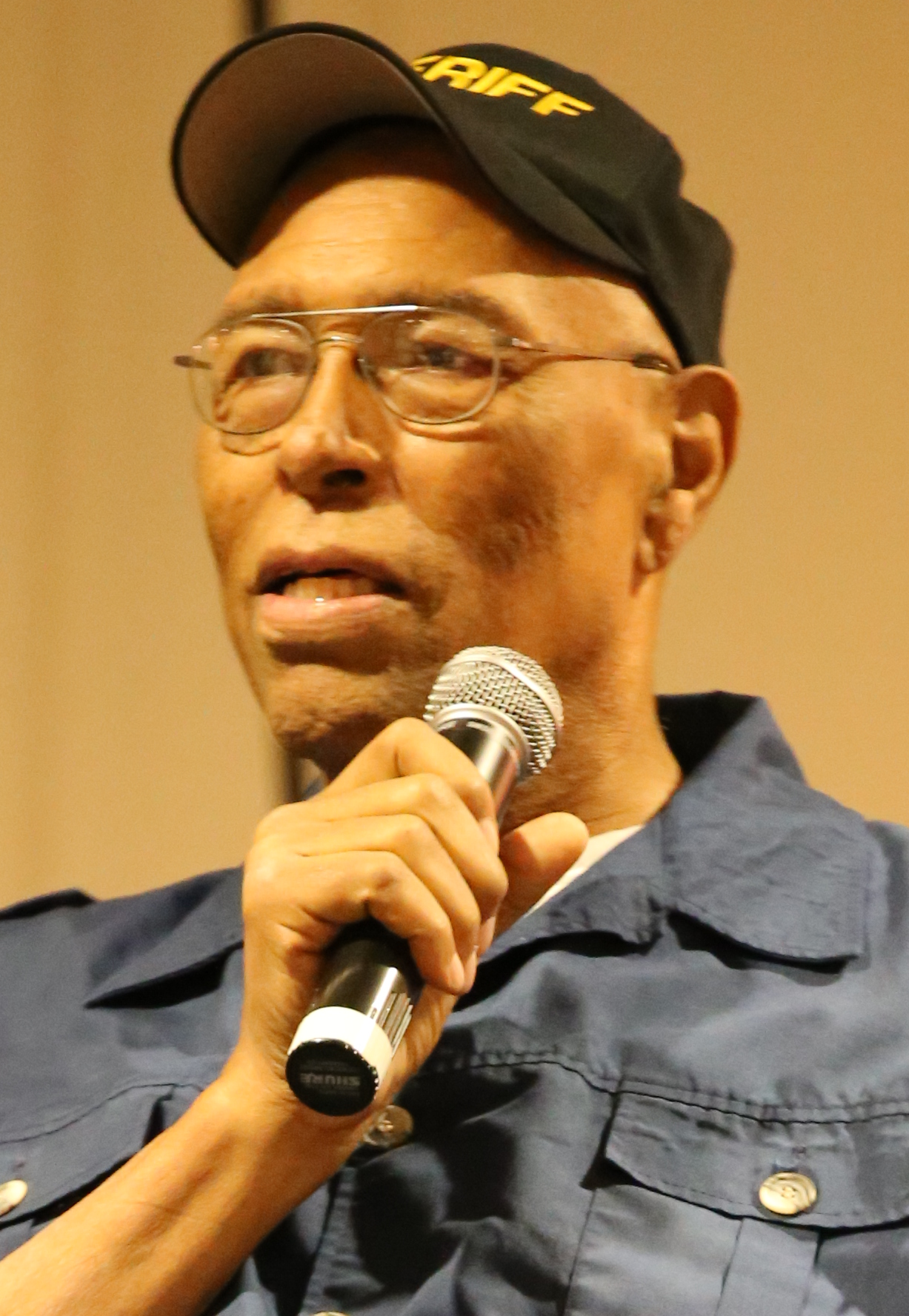
- Colley in 2015
- Born: August 30, 1938; Klamath Falls, Oregon, U.S.
- Died: October 11, 2017 (aged 79); Klamath Falls, Oregon, U.S.
- Education: University of Oregon
- Occupation: Actor
- Years active: 1967–2016
- Children: 1

Don Pedro Colley (August 30, 1938 – October 11, 2017) was an American actor. Some of his better known roles include Gideon on Daniel Boone, Ongaro in Beneath the Planet of the Apes, SRT in George Lucas' THX 1138, Joshua in The Legend of Nigger Charley, and Chickasaw County Sheriff Ed Little in the 1980s TV series The Dukes of Hazzard.

== Early life ==
Colley was born in Klamath Falls, Oregon, to Muriel and Pete Colley. He attended Klamath Union High School and actively played football and track and field, which led to an unsuccessful try-out for the 1960 Summer Olympics. He later attended the University of Oregon and studied architecture. Later, he became a theatre member and spent five years learning his craft in various productions in San Francisco.

== Career ==
Colley appeared in several 1960s and '70s television Westerns that included The Wild, Wild West, Cimarron Strip, The Virginian, Nichols, and Iron Horse. He was a guest at the 2012 Memphis Film Festival's "A Gathering of Guns 4: A TV Western Reunion" at the Whispering Woods Hotel and Conference Center in Olive Branch, Mississippi.

During the 1970s Blaxploitation era, Don appeared alongside Fred "The Hammer" Williamson, D'Urville Martin, and Gloria Hendry in such films as Legend of Nigger Charley, Black Caesar, and Sugar Hill.

Throughout his career, Don made several guest appearances in many popular TV series, including Adam 12, Night Gallery, Ironside, The Streets of San Francisco, Harry O, Little House on the Prairie, Starsky and Hutch, The Bionic Woman, Fantasy Island, and The A-Team. However, he is probably best known for his roles of Gideon in the series Daniel Boone, SRT in George Lucas' THX 1138, in Beneath the Planet of the Apes as Ongaro, and as Sheriff Little in the TV series Dukes of Hazzard.

== Death ==
Colley died of cancer in his hometown of Klamath Falls, Oregon, on October 11, 2017, at the age of 79.

== Filmography ==
- The Bill Cosby Show (1969 TV series 1x24) - Big Bronson
- Daniel Boone (1968–1969, TV series) - Gideon
- The Virginian (1968, TV series) - Ira Diller
- Here Come the Brides (1968, TV series) - Ox
- Beneath the Planet of the Apes (1970) - Ongaro
- Believe in Me (1971) - Man
- THX 1138 (1971) - SRT
- Adam-12 (1971, TV series) - T. Leeland Sabeth
- Crosscurrent (1971, TV movie) - Freddie Trench
- The Legend of Nigger Charley (1972) - Joshua
- Lapin 360 (1972)
- The World's Greatest Athlete (1973) - Morumba
- Black Caesar (1973) - Crawdaddy
- This Is a Hijack (1973) - Champ
- Sugar Hill (1974) - Baron Samedi
- Herbie Rides Again (1974) - Barnstorff
- Little House on the Prairie (1977, TV series) - Dr. Tane
- Starsky and Hutch (1977, TV series) - Papa Theodore
- Space Academy (1977, TV series) - Dramon
- Casino (1980, TV movie) - Sam
- The Dukes of Hazzard (1981–1984, TV series) - Sheriff Ed Little
- The Blue Iguana (1988) - Boat Captain
- Journey of Honor (1991) - Narrator (voice)
- Quest of the Delta Knights (1993) - Black Spy
- Cagney & Lacey: The Return (1994, TV movie) - Virgil
- Piranha (1995) - Leonard
- A Hollow Place (1998, short) - Office Stern
- Midnight Massacre (2016) - President Tarquin
