= The Landlord =

1970 film by Hal Ashby

- Theatrical release poster
- Directed by: Hal Ashby
- Screenplay by: Bill Gunn
- Based on: The Landlord; 1966 novel by Kristin Hunter
- Produced by: Norman Jewison
- Starring: Beau Bridges; Lee Grant; Diana Sands; Pearl Bailey
- Cinematography: Gordon Willis
- Edited by: William A. Sawyer; Edward Warschilka
- Music by: Al Kooper
- Production companies: Mirisch Company; Cartier Productions
- Distributed by: United Artists
- Release date: May 20, 1970
- Running time: 113 minutes
- Language: English
- Budget: $1.95 million

The Landlord is a 1970 American comedy-drama film directed by Hal Ashby, adapted by Bill Gunn from the 1966 novel by Kristin Hunter. The film stars Beau Bridges in the lead role of privileged and ignorant white man Elgar Enders who becomes the landlord of an inner-city tenement, unaware that the people he is responsible for are low-income, streetwise residents. Also in the cast are Lee Grant, Diana Sands, Pearl Bailey, Louis Gossett Jr., Walter Brooke and Gloria Hendry. The film was Ashby's directorial debut.

== Plot ==
Elgar Enders, who lives off an allowance from his wealthy parents William and Joyce, buys an inner-city tenement in Park Slope, Brooklyn, which is undergoing gentrification, planning to evict the occupants and construct a luxury home for himself. However, once he ventures into the tenement, he grows fond of the low-income black residents. Elgar decides to remain the landlord and help fix the building. He rebels against his WASP upbringing and, to his parents' dismay, romances two black women.

The first is Lanie, a mixed-race dancer at a local black club. Lanie has light skin and features due to her having a mother of Irish descent and a father of African descent, and has experienced colorism. Their relationship is strained, as Elgar has an affair with one of his tenants, Fanny Johnson, and gets her pregnant. Her husband, Copee, a black activist with an identity crisis, is enraged when he finds out about the pregnancy, and tries to kill Elgar with an axe but stops. He is taken away in a straitjacket.

In recovery at the hospital, Fanny tells Elgar she can't raise the child herself with Copee returning home. Elgar balks at being a single father, so Fanny suggests they give the child up for adoption, but only to a white family to start a new life. The story ends with Elgar taking custody of the child, mending his relationship with Lanie, and moving in with her.

== Cast ==
Actor	Role
Beau Bridges	Elgar Winthrop Julius Enders
Lee Grant	Joyce Enders
Diana Sands	Francine "Fanny" Johnson
Pearl Bailey	Marge
Walter Brooke	William Enders
Louis Gossett Jr.	Copee Johnson
Marki Bey	Lanie
Gloria Hendry	Gloria
Melvin Stewart	Professor Duboise
Florynce Kennedy	Enid
Susan Anspach	Susan Enders
Robert Klein	Peter Coots
Will Mackenzie	William Enders Jr.

Charlie Murphy, older brother of Eddie Murphy, lived in the neighborhood where the film was shot, and he appears in a brief scene as a boy stealing Elgar's hubcaps.

== Reception and legacy ==
The film was a commercial disappointment. Arthur Krim of United Artists later did an assessment of the film as part of an evaluation of the company's inventory:

What was expected to be provocative material to the new modern film audience of 1968-1969 in depicting black and white relationships in an urban setting, emerged as a film which we felt would be of limited interest to the audience of 1970 - an audience more and more sated with films of this genre. This is still a type of film we intend to continue to make but at one-quarter the cost. Unfortunately, at the time this film was programmed, unrealistic optimism about the potential audience for this type of film prevailed.

=== Critical reaction ===
The film garnered mostly positive reviews from critics. On Rotten Tomatoes, it has received a 93% overall approval rating from 14 critics. Upon its release, New York Times film critic Howard Thompson, called the film "a wondrously wise, sad and hilarious comedy." On September 19, 2007, journalist Mike Hale discussed the film in a New York Times article called "Before Gentrification Was Cool, It Was a Movie". Hale praised the film for tackling the racial tension that arose in the aftermath of the assassination of Martin Luther King Jr. and wrote in surprise how the film "would disappear after its 1970 release – rarely shown and just as rarely discussed."

=== Awards and nominations ===
Award	Category	Nominee(s)	Result	Ref.
Academy Awards	Best Supporting Actress	Lee Grant	Nominated	
British Academy Film Awards	United Nations Award	Hal Ashby	Nominated	
Golden Globe Awards	Best Supporting Actress – Motion Picture	Lee Grant	Nominated	
Laurel Awards	Top Female Supporting Performance	Lee Grant	4th Place	
Laurel Awards	Top Female Star of Tomorrow	Diana Sands	6th Place	
