= Gloria Hendry =

American actress (born 1949)

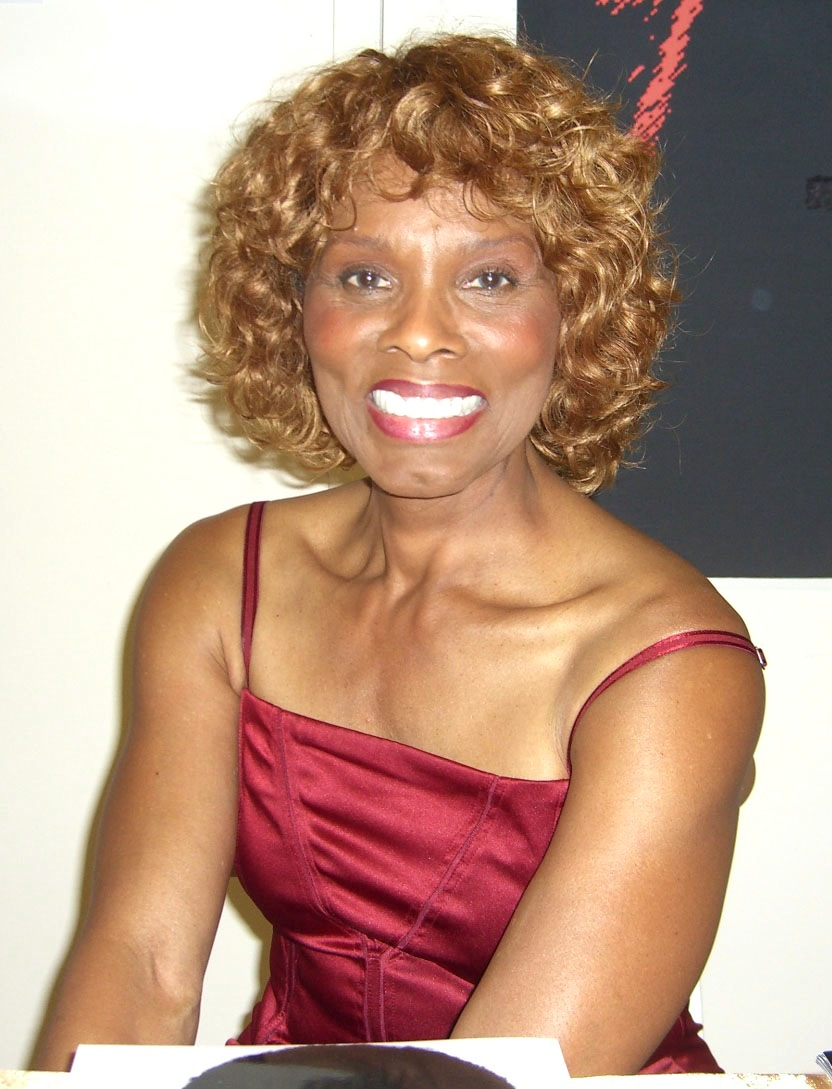
- Hendry at the 2008 Big Apple Con
- Born: March 3, 1949 (age 77); Jacksonville, Florida, U.S. or Winter Haven, Florida, U.S. (sources differ)
- Occupations: Actress; model
- Years active: 1968–present
- Known for: Rosie Carver – Live and Let Die
- Spouse: Phillip W. Wright (m. 1995–2022) (his death)

Gloria Hendry (born March 3, 1949) is an American actress and former model. Hendry is best known for her roles in films from the 1970s, most notably: portraying Rosie Carver in 1973's James Bond film Live and Let Die; and Helen Bradley in the blaxploitation film Black Caesar, and the sequel, Hell Up in Harlem.

== Biography ==
=== Early life and education ===
Born in Jacksonville or Winter Haven, Florida (sources differ), Hendry was the older of two daughters. Hendry's family, which consisted of her mother and sister relocated to Newark, New Jersey to live with her grandparents during her early childhood. Hendry studied at Essex College of Business for Law.

=== Career ===
Hendry worked as a Playboy Bunny at the New York Playboy Club from 1965 until 1972. In 1968, Hendry received her first acting role in Sidney Poitier's film For Love of Ivy, followed by a small role in the 1970 film The Landlord. In 1973, Hendry portrayed the Bond Girl Rosie Carver in the James Bond film Live and Let Die. In that film, she became the first African American woman to become romantically involved with 007. In the previous Bond film Diamonds Are Forever, Trina Parks played "Thumper", a nemesis to Bond rather than a love interest, and is considered to be the first Black Bond girl.

Hendry later starred in several 1970s blaxploitation films, including Across 110th Street (1972), Slaughter's Big Rip-Off (1973), and both the 1973 films Black Caesar and its sequel Hell Up in Harlem. She also portrayed the martial arts expert, Sydney, in Black Belt Jones (1974), and appeared in Savage Sisters (1974) and Bare Knuckles (1977). Her later films included the horror film Pumpkinhead II: Blood Wings (1994) and the action comedy Freaky Deaky (2012).

== Filmography ==
=== Film ===
Year	Title	Role	Notes
1968	For Love of Ivy	Cocktail Waitress	
1970	The Landlord	Gloria	
1972	Across 110th Street	Laurelene	
1973	Black Caesar	Helen Bradley	
1973	Live and Let Die	Rosie Carver	
1973	Slaughter's Big Rip-Off	Marcia	
1973	Hell Up in Harlem	Helen Bradley-Washington	
1974	Black Belt Jones	Sydney Byrd	
1974	Savage Sisters	Lynn Jackson	
1977	Bare Knuckles	Barbara Darrow	
1993	Pumpkinhead II: Blood Wings	Delilah Pettibone	
1994	Lookin' Italian	Leon's Mother	
2008	Man in the Mirror	Street Hooker	
2009	Absolute Evil	Blind Woman	
2012	Freaky Deaky	Sgt. Maureen Downey	
2019	A Brother's Honor	Hannah	
2021	Snow Black	Aunt Sydney	
2024	Rock and Doris (try to) Write a Movie	Mrs. Franklin	

== Sources ==
- Paul, Louis (2008). "Gloria Hendry". Tales From the Cult Film Trenches; Interviews with 36 Actors from Horror, Science Fiction and Exploitation Cinema. Detroit: Wayne State University Press. pp. 90–97. ISBN 978-0-7864-2994-3.
