= The Big Score (1983 film) =

1983 film by Fred Williamson

- Directed by: Fred Williamson
- Screenplay by: Gail Morgan Hickman
- Starring: Fred Williamson; Nancy Wilson; John Saxon; Richard Roundtree; Ed Lauter; Michael Dante; Bruce Glover; Joe Spinell; Frank Pesce; Tony King; Chelcie Ross; Ron Dean; Greg Noonan; Jack Wallace Michael White; Joe Krowka
- Cinematography: João Fernandes
- Edited by: Daniel Loewenthal
- Music by: Jay Chattaway
- Release date: 25 November 1983
- Running time: 85 minutes
- Country: United States
- Language: English

The Big Score is a 1983 American crime drama film directed by Fred Williamson. The film has music composed by Jay Chattaway.

== Story ==
A Chicago cop is dismissed from the force unfairly and needs to clear his name. Accused of theft, he goes after people who committed the crime. Now that he is out of the force, he is not bound by the rules as he goes after the drug lord (played by Joe Spinnell). Richard Roundtree and John Saxon appear in the film as his fellow police officers.

== Cast ==
- Fred Williamson as Detective Frank Hooks
- Nancy Wilson as Angie Hooks
- John Saxon as Davis
- Richard Roundtree as Gordon
- Ed Lauter as Parks
- Michael Dante as "Goldie" Jackson
- D'Urville Martin as "Easy"
- Bruce Glover as Koslo
- Joe Spinell as Mayfield
- Frank Pesce as J.C.
- Tony King as "Jumbo"
- Chelcie Ross as Hoffa
- Ron Dean as Kowalski
- Greg Noonan
- Jack Wallace
- Joe Krowka
