= Hell Up in Harlem =

1973 film by Larry Cohen

- Theatrical release poster by John Solie
- Directed by: Larry Cohen
- Written by: Larry Cohen
- Produced by: Larry Cohen
- Starring: Fred Williamson; Margaret Avery; Julius Harris; Gloria Hendry; D'Urville Martin
- Cinematography: Fenton Hamilton
- Edited by: Franco Guerri; Peter Honess
- Music by: Edwin Starr; Fonce Mizell; Freddie Perren
- Production company: Larco Productions
- Distributed by: American International Pictures
- Release date: December 16, 1973
- Running time: 94 minutes
- Country: United States
- Language: English
- Box office: $1,550,000

Hell Up in Harlem is a 1973 blaxploitation American film starring Fred Williamson and Gloria Hendry. Written and directed by Larry Cohen, it is a sequel to the film Black Caesar.

The film's soundtrack, recorded by Edwin Starr and produced and chiefly written by Fonce Mizell and Freddie Perren, was released by Motown Records in January 1974. James Brown had originally been contracted to provide the soundtrack; his version was rejected. Brown instead released his tracks in late 1973 as a studio album, entitled The Payback.

== Plot ==
Having survived the assassination attempt at the end of Black Caesar, Tommy Gibbs takes on corrupt New York District Attorney James DiAngelo, who had sought to jail Gibbs and his father, Papa Gibbs, in order to monopolize the illicit drug trade. Gibbs decides to eliminate drug pushing from the streets of Harlem, while continuing to carry out his other illicit enterprises. Gibbs falls in love with Sister Jennifer, a woman who works with Reverend Rufus, a former pimp who has found a religious calling.

Gibbs and Papa have a falling out after Gibbs is told by his enforcer, Zach, that Papa ordered the death of Gibbs' ex-wife, Helen Bradley-Washington. Gibbs and Jennifer move to Los Angeles, leaving Papa in charge of the Harlem territory. It is later revealed that Zach himself killed Helen as part of a move to take over the territory, with the assistance of DiAngelo. Gibbs defeats hit men sent to take him out in Los Angeles, while Papa dies from a heart attack while fighting Zach.

Knowing that DiAngelo will be having the New York airports and roads watched, Gibbs flies in to Philadelphia and enters New York City on foot in order to carry out a personal war against Zach and DiAngelo.

== Cast ==
- Fred Williamson as Tommy Gibbs
- Julius Harris as Thomas "Papa" Gibbs Sr.
- Gloria Hendry as Helen Bradley-Washington
- Margaret Avery as Sister Jennifer
- D'Urville Martin as Reverend Rufus Fairchild
- Tony King as Zach
- Gerald Gordon as DiAngelo
- Bobby Ramsen as Joe Frankfurter
- James Dixon as "Irish" Bryant
- Esther Sutherland as The Cook
- Charles MacGuire as Charles MacGregor

== Reception ==
On the review aggregator website Rotten Tomatoes, 20% of 10 critics' reviews are positive.

== Home media ==
In 2001, the film was released on DVD. In 2010, it was digitized in High Definition (1080i) and broadcast on MGMHD.

== See also ==
- List of American films of 1973
