= Fred Williamson =

American football player and actor (born 1938)

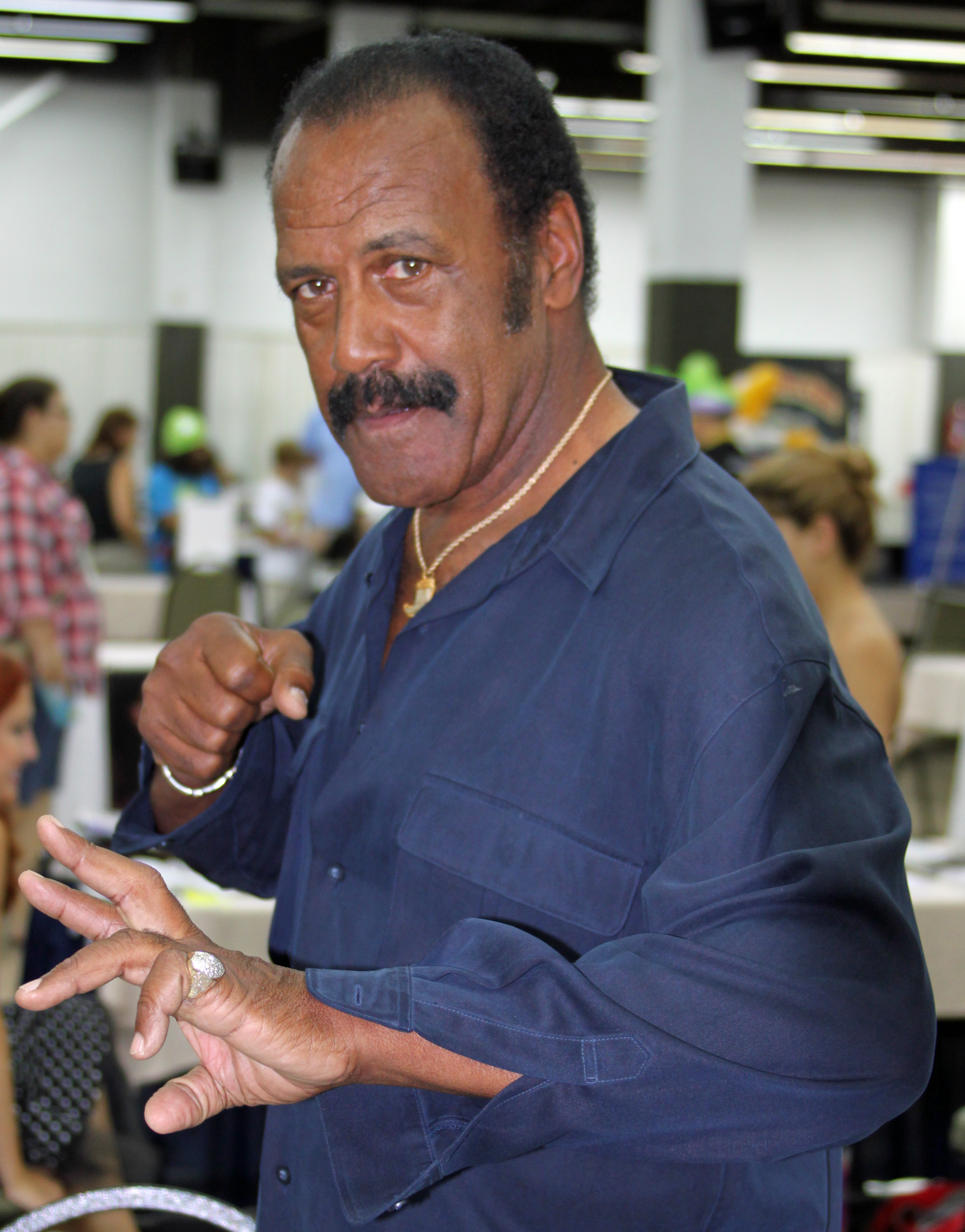
- Williamson in 2010
- Born: Frederick Robert Williamson; March 5, 1938 (age 88); Gary, Indiana, U.S.
- Other names: The Hammer; Black Caesar
- Education: Northwestern University
- Occupations: Actor; film director; producer
- Years active: 1968–present
- Spouses: Ginette Lavonda (m. 1960; div. 1967) Linda Williamson (m. 1988)
- Children: At least 3
- Football career

No. 24
- Position: Defensive back

Personal information
- Listed height: 6 ft 3 in (1.91 m)
- Listed weight: 220 lb (100 kg)

Career information
- College: Northwestern
- NFL draft: 1960: undrafted

Career history
- Pittsburgh Steelers (1960); Oakland Raiders (1961–1964); Kansas City Chiefs (1965–1967)

Awards and highlights
- AFL champion (1966); 3× AFL All-Star (1961, 1962, 1963)

Career NFL statistics
- Interceptions: 36
- Stats at Pro Football Reference

Frederick Robert Williamson (born March 5, 1938), nicknamed "the Hammer", is an American actor, filmmaker, and former football player. He played professional football as a defensive back, primarily in the American Football League (AFL) during the 1960s. He was a top sports star during the decade, and became a leading man in blaxploitation and action films beginning in the 1970s.

Williamson played college football for the Northwestern Wildcats, and played in the National Football League (NFL) with the Pittsburgh Steelers for one season. In the AFL, Williamson played cornerback with the Oakland Raiders for four seasons, becoming a three-time AFL All-Star (1961, '62, '63). He then played three seasons with the Kansas City Chiefs, where was a one-time AFL champion ('66). During his football career, he earned the nickname "the Hammer" for his aggressive playing style, which incorporated martial arts techniques.

After retiring from football in 1968, Williamson made a string of guest and supporting roles on television and in films. He played his first leading role in the blaxploitation Western The Legend of Nigger Charley (1972), which he reprised in two sequels. He starred as Tommy Gibbs in the 1973 crime drama film Black Caesar and its sequel Hell Up in Harlem. Williamson also had roles in other 1970s blaxploitation films such as Hammer (1972), That Man Bolt (1973), Three the Hard Way (1974), and Bucktown (1975). Later in the decade, he worked extensively in Italian cinema, and also began to direct and produce his own films.

== Early life and education ==
Born in Gary, Indiana, Williamson was the only child born to Frank, a welder and Lydia Williamson. Williamson attended Froebel High School in Gary, where he ran track and played football. He graduated in 1956. After high school, Williamson left Gary to attend Northwestern University on a track and field scholarship, earning a degree in architecture.

== Professional football career ==
After playing college football for Northwestern in the late 1950s, Williamson was signed as an undrafted free agent by the San Francisco 49ers. When during training camp he was switched to their defense, his attitude over the switch prompted him to play his position with too much aggression, and the coach of the 49ers asked him to quit "hammering" his players. Thus, "The Hammer" quickly stuck and became his nickname.

Williamson was traded to the Pittsburgh Steelers and played one year for the Steelers in the National Football League in 1960. Next, he moved to the new American Football League. Williamson played cornerback for four seasons with the AFL's Oakland Raiders, making the AFL All-Star team in 1961, 1962, and 1963. He also played three seasons for the AFL's Kansas City Chiefs. During his period of playing for the Chiefs, Williamson became one of football's first self-promoters, nurturing the nickname "The Hammer" because he used his forearm to deliver karate-style blows to the heads of opposing players, especially wide receivers. Before Super Bowl I, Williamson garnered national headlines by boasting that he would knock the Green Bay Packers starting receivers, Carroll Dale and Boyd Dowler, out of the game. He stated "Two hammers to Dowler, one to Dale should be enough".

His prediction turned out to be an ironic one because "they (Green Bay) broke the hammer" as Williamson himself was knocked out of the game in the fourth quarter on the way to a 35–10 defeat. Williamson's head met the knee of the Packers' running back Donny Anderson. Williamson later suffered a broken arm from his own teammate when Chiefs linebacker Sherrill Headrick fell on him. Williamson finished his eight-season pro football career in 1967 with a history of many hard tackles, passes defensed, and 36 pass interceptions in 104 games. Williamson returned his interceptions for 479 yards and two touchdowns. After signing with the Montreal Alouettes of the Canadian Football League during the 1968 season, but not having played in a league game, Williamson retired.

== Acting career ==
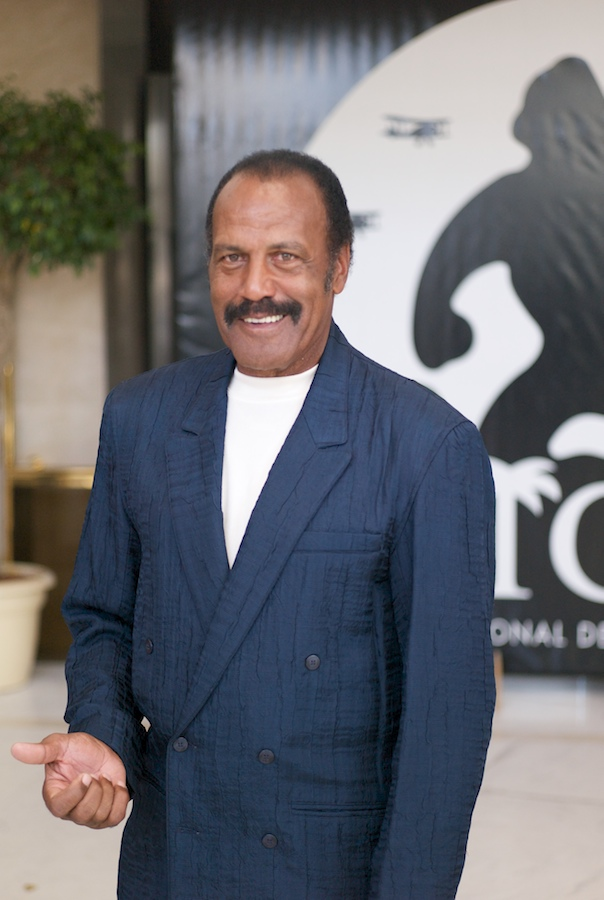
Williamson at the Festival de Cine de Sitges, October 2008.

Williamson acted alongside further American football player Jim Brown in Three the Hard Way (1974), Take a Hard Ride (1975), One Down, Two to Go (1982), Original Gangstas (1996) and On the Edge (2002). Williamson also guest starred with Brown in various television roles. In October 1973, Williamson posed nude for Playgirl magazine, predating Brown's appearance in 1974. Williamson's early television roles included a role in the original Star Trek episode "The Cloud Minders" (1969), in which he played Anka. He also played Diahann Carroll's love interest in the sitcom Julia.

=== Monday Night Football ===
In 1974, Williamson was hired by the ABC television network to serve as a color commentator on Monday Night Football, replacing Don Meredith, who had left to pursue an acting and broadcasting career at rival network NBC. Williamson was used on a few pre-season broadcasts, and was quickly declared unsuitable by ABC.

=== Working with clique of actors ===
Williamson has co-starred in a number of films with Bo Svenson. They include, The Inglorious Bastards (1978), Deadly Impact (1984), Delta Force Commando (1987), The Kill Reflex (1989), Three Days to a Kill (1991), and Steele's Law (1991). He also co-starred with D'Urville Martin in the following movies: Hammer, Black Caesar, Hell Up in Harlem, Blind Rage and Pam Grier in Bucktown USA, and Original Gangstas. He co-starred with Jim Brown in MASH as well as Original Gangstas.

=== Directing and producing ===
Since the 1970s, Williamson has had another career as a director and producer. His first film as producer was Boss Nigger (1975), in which he also starred. His second film as producer was with Mean Johnny Barrows (1976), a predecessor of the Rambo films which similarly featured a violent Vietnam Vet plot (though the novel First Blood on which the film First Blood was based was written in 1972). He has since directed over 20 features. In the middle of the 1970s, Williamson relocated to Rome, Italy and formed his own company Po' Boy Productions, which started to produce actioners including Adios Amigo (1976) and Death Journey (1976), both of which starred and were directed by Williamson. Although his most recent efforts as director and producer have mainly been direct-to-video, Williamson remains an active filmmaker.

== Personal life ==
Williamson has been married twice. His first marriage was to Ginette Lavonda from 1960 until 1967. Williamson has been married to Linda Williamson since 1988. Williamson has at least three children and some sources state he has at least six. Since 1997, Williamson has had a home in Palm Springs, California.

In June 2020, The Daily Beast reported that Williamson had allegedly attempted to grope an assistant costume designer during a wardrobe fitting. He denied the charge.

== Filmography ==
=== Film ===
Year	Title	Role	Notes
1970	M*A*S*H	Dr. Oliver "Spearchucker" Jones	
1970	Tell Me That You Love Me, Junie Moon	Beach Boy	
1972	The Legend of Nigger Charley	Nigger Charley	
1972	Hammer	B.J. Hammer	
1973	Black Caesar	Tommy Gibbs	
1973	The Soul of Nigger Charley	Charley	
1973	Hell Up in Harlem	Tommy Gibbs	
1973	That Man Bolt	Jefferson Bolt	
1974	Crazy Joe	Willy	
1974	Three Tough Guys	Joe Snake	
1974	Black Eye	Shep Stone	
1974	Three the Hard Way	Jagger Daniels	
1975	Boss Nigger	Boss Nigger	
1975	Bucktown	Duke Johnson	
1975	Take a Hard Ride	Tyree	
1975	Mean Johnny Barrows	Johnny Barrows	Also director
1975	The New Spartans	Lincoln Jefferson Washington IV	
1976	Adios Amigo	Ben "Big Ben"	Also director
1976	Death Journey	Jesse Crowder	Also director
1976	No Way Back	Jesse Crowder	Also director
1976	Joshua	Joshua	
1977	Mr. Mean	Mr. Mean	Also director
1978	Blind Rage	Jesse Crowder	
1978	The Inglorious Bastards	Private Fred Canfield	
1980	Fist of Fear, Touch of Death	Himself	
1981	Fear In The City	John Dikson	
1982	Vigilante	Nick	
1982	1990: The Bronx Warriors	The Ogre	
1982	One Down, Two to Go	Cal	Also director
1982	The New Barbarians	Nadir	
1983	The Last Fight	Jesse Crowder	Also director
1983	The Big Score	Detective Frank Hooks	Also director
1983	Warrior of the Lost World	Henchman	
1984	Warriors of the Year 2072	Abdul	
1984	Deadly Impact	Lou	
1985	White Fire	Noah Barclay	
1986	Foxtrap	Thomas Fox	Also director
1986	The Messenger	Jake Sebastian Turner	Also director
1987	Black Cobra	Detective Robert Malone	
1987	Inglorious Bastards 2: Hell's Heroes	Feather	
1988	Delta Force Commando	Captain Samuel Beck	
1988	Taxi Killer		
1988	Deadly Intent	Curt Slate	
1989	Black Cobra 2	Detective Robert Malone	
1990	The Kill Reflex	Soda Cracker	Also director
1990	Delta Force Commando II: Priority Red One	Captain Sam Back	
1990	Black Cobra 3	Detective Robert Malone	
1991	Black Cobra 4	Detective Robert Malone	
1991	Steele's Law	Lieutenant John Steele	Also director
1992	Three Days to a Kill	Cal	Also director
1992	State Of Mind	Loomis	
1992	Deceptions	Brady	
1993	South Beach	Mack Derringer	Also director
1995	Silent Hunter	Sheriff Mantee	Also director
1996	From Dusk till Dawn	Frost	
1996	Original Gangstas	John Bookman	
1997	Night Vision	Dakota "Dak" Smith	
1997	Pitch	Himself	Documentary
1998	Ride	Casper's Dream Dad	
1998	Children of the Corn V: Fields of Terror	Sheriff Skaggs	
1998	Whatever It Takes	Paulie Salano	
2000	Active Stealth	Captain Reynolds	
2000	Submerged	Captain Masters	
2000	Down 'n Dirty	Dakota Smith	Also director
2000	The Independent	Himself	
2001	Deadly Rhapsody	Jake	
2001	Shadow Fury	Sam	
2001	The Rage Within	Dakota Smith	
2002	On the Edge	Dakota Smith	Also director
2004	Starsky & Hutch	Captain Doby	
2004	If Love Hadn't Left Me Lonely	Willie Brownlee Davis	Also director
2005	Transformed	"The Hammer"	
2006	Spaced Out	"The Hammer"	
2006	Crooked	Jack Paxton	
2007	Vegas Vampires	Fred Pittman	Also director
2007	Fighting Words	Gabriel	
2007	Revamped	Captain Michaels	
2010	Shoot the Hero!	The General	
2010	Street Poet	Gabriel	
2010	Zombie Apocalypse: Redemption	Moses	
2012	The Voices from Beyond	Agent Farley	
2012	Last Ounce of Courage	Warren Hammerschmidt	
2012	Dropping Evil	Commander Death Blood	
2013	.357	"Hammer"	
2014	Billy Trigger	Pops	
2015	Atomic Eden	Stoker	
2017	Check Point	Chester	
2017	A Chance in the World	Charlie	
2018	Unkillable	Master Lee	
2018	Jackson Bolt	Tommy	
2018	A Stone Cold Christmas	Mark Kurt	
2019	Bodyguard Wars		
2019	VFW	Abe Hawkins	
2021	Devil's Triangle	Pluto	

=== Television ===
Year	Title	Role	Notes
1968	Ironside	Detective Sergeant La Peer	1 episode
1969	The Outsider	Randall	1 episode
1969	Star Trek: The Original Series	Anka	Episode: "The Cloud Minders" (S3.E21)
1969	The Bold Ones: The Protectors	Arnold Bartell / Officer Williams	2 episodes
1969–1971	Julia	Steve Bruce / Dave Boyd	17 episodes
1972–1974	Soul Train	Guest	
1973–1976	Police Story	Sergeant Bunny Green / "Snake" McKay	2 episodes
1974	The Rookies	Johnny Barrows	1 episode
1978	Wheels	Leonard Wingate	TV miniseries
1979	Supertrain	Al Roberts	1 episode
1979	CHiPs	Ty	2 episodes
1979	Fantasy Island	Jackson Malone	1 episode
1981	Lou Grant	"Crusher" Carter	1 episode
1985	Half Nelson	Chester Long	7 episodes
1985	The Equalizer	Lieutenant Mason Warren	Episode: "Reign of Terror"
1985	The Equalizer	Lieutenant Mason Warren	Episode: "Back Home"
1988	Amen	Barnet Thompson	1 episode
1994	Renegade	Jean-Luc Leveaux	1 episode
1996	Arliss	Fred Williamson	1 episode
1997–1998	Fast Track	Lowell Carter	22 episodes
1998	Blackjack	Tim Hastings	TV movie
1998	Psi Factor	Fred Milton Di genova / Fred Milton Di Genova	2 episodes
2000	The Jamie Foxx Show	Himself	1 episode
2001	Carmen: A Hip Hopera	Lou	TV movie
2002	Sexual Preadator Alert	Host	
2005	Ned's Declassified School Survival Guide	Coach Stax	1 episode
2007–2008	Hello Paradise		
2009	Knight Rider	DEA Director	1 episode
2009	Pushing Daisies	Roland "Rollie" Stingwell	1 episode
2012–2015	Comedy Bang! Bang!	Chief / Dale's Boss	2 episodes
2014–2016	Real Husbands of Hollywood	Jet Black	2 episodes
2017	Being Mary Jane	Frank Pearl	3 episodes

== See also ==
- List of American Football League players
