= Hammer (1972 film) =

1972 American blaxploitation film

- US film poster
- Directed by: Bruce D. Clark
- Written by: Charles Eric Johnson
- Produced by: Al Adamson
- Starring: Fred Williamson; Bernie Hamilton; Vonetta McGee; William Smith
- Cinematography: Robert Steadman
- Edited by: George Folsey Jr.
- Music by: Solomon Burke
- Production company: Essaness Productions
- Distributed by: United Artists
- Release date: September 20, 1972
- Running time: 91 minutes
- Country: United States
- Language: English

Hammer is a 1972 blaxploitation film directed by Bruce D. Clark. The film was released following the successes of Sweet Sweetback's Baadasssss Song and Shaft, notable 1971 films that popularized black cinema. It starred Fred Williamson as B.J. Hammer. Williamson went on to become a staple of the genre.

== Plot ==
Boxing manager Big Sid is told by the head of a crime syndicate that a shipment of heroin is arriving, and in turn, Sid instructs his henchman Brenner to oversee the shipment. At the dock where the shipment is to arrive, a dock worker named Riley beats up an innocent worker, and his coworker B.J Hammer beats Riley up, resulting in Hammer getting fired. Boxing trainer Professor then presents Hammer to Sid, and Hammer happily signs Sid as his manager, much to the chagrin of police detective Davis. However, another boxer signed to Sid, Roughouse, wants out of Sid’s shady business, and as a result, Brenner fatally crushes him with his car in an alley that night.

Hammer begins training, and soon falls in love with Sid’s secretary, Lois, who is unaware of Sid’s activities, and initially rejects Hammer for not being “together” enough for her. Hammer slowly becomes the biggest boxer in town, but Davis rebuffs his victories, telling him that his opponent took dives when Sid paid them to. Davis then begs to find evidence to arrest Sid, but Hammer claims he’s innocent. However, another boxer that signed up for Sid, Henry is in on the drug trade, and evades police with drugs, but when the drugs are confiscated, Brenner then gives Henry a fatal dose of Heroin, and he succumbs to the overdose. At a party the next night, Davis informs Hammer and Lois that Henry has died. Hammer brushes Davis off, but when he talks to Lois, she claims Davis makes sense, as she witnessed Henry’s behavior at Sid’s office.

However, as time goes on, Hammer starts to question his career due to his fast rise and also because several of his old friends are suspicious about his fast rise to fame. Eventually, the head of the crime syndicate tells Sid that Hammer takes a dive so they can make a profit, and even more so when he wins his next fight. To ensure this, Brenner, no longer under Sid’s control kidnaps Lois to ensure he takes a dive, and worried, Hammer and Davis search around town for her to no avail. Davis goes to search for Lois as Hammer goes into the ring.

Davis finds Lois held captive by Riley, and frees her. When word of her freedom reaches Hammer, he knocks out his opponent in the ninth round. Brenner shoots Sid dead before fighting Hammer in the garage. After a violent duel, Hammer smashes Brenner’s face into a car window, killing him. Davis arrives with Lois, who eventually leaves the scene with Hammer after promising him she’d stick by him no matter what.

== Cast ==
- Fred Williamson as B.J. Hammer
- Bernie Hamilton as Davis
- Vonetta McGee as Lois
- Charles Lampkin as Sid "Big Sid"
- William Smith as Brenner
- Elizabeth Harding as Rhoda
- Mel Stewart as Professor
- Stack Pierce as "Roughhouse"
- John Quade as Riley
- D'Urville Martin as Sonny
- Leon Isaac as Bobby Williams
- George P. Wilbur as Brady

== Reception and legacy ==
The movie gained a positive reception. "The Hammer" has become Williamson's official nickname, earned during his time playing professional football. Williamson is also credited as playing "Hammer, the ladies man," in the 1980 martial arts film Fist of Fear, Touch of Death and as "The Hammer" in a 2006 direct-to-video release called Spaced Out.

== Releases on DVD & HD ==
- In 2004 it was released on DVD.
- In 2010 it was digitized in High Definition (1080i) and broadcast on MGM HD.
- In 2015 it was released on Blu-Ray DVD by Olive Films.
