= Black Caesar (film) =

1973 film by Larry Cohen

- Theatrical release poster
- Directed by: Larry Cohen
- Written by: Larry Cohen
- Produced by: Larry Cohen
- Starring: Fred Williamson; Gloria Hendry; D'Urville Martin; Julius Harris
- Cinematography: Fenton Hamilton
- Edited by: George Folsey Jr.
- Music by: James Brown
- Production company: Larco Productions
- Distributed by: American International Pictures
- Release date: February 7, 1973
- Running time: 95 minutes
- Country: United States
- Language: English
- Box office: $2 million (US/ Canada rentals)

Black Caesar (stylized as Black Cæsar and released in UK cinemas as Godfather of Harlem) is a 1973 American blaxploitation crime drama film written and directed by Larry Cohen and starring Fred Williamson, Gloria Hendry and Julius Harris. It features a musical score, Black Caesar, by James Brown, with heavy input from his bandleader Fred Wesley, his first experience with writing music for film. A sequel titled Hell Up in Harlem was released in late 1973.

== Plot ==
Tommy Gibbs is an African-American who grew up in Harlem, New York City. As a kid, he was brutally assaulted by a cop named Jack McKinney. As an adult, he joins the New York mafia and becomes the head of a black crime syndicate in Harlem. He wages a gang war with the Italian mobsters of New York City and begins to establish a criminal empire, keeping a ledger book of all his dealings as leverage over his business associates, including McKinney.

He meets and falls in love with a singer named Helen Bradley and marries her. She is unhappy as he is violent and rapes her. Eventually his enemies conspire with her, leading to an attempt on his life that leaves him shot and wounded. Killing his would-be assassins, he returns to his office to retrieve the ledger book. McKinney meets him there and attempts to humiliate him before killing him. Tommy overpowers McKinney and beats him to death. Retrieving the ledger, a badly wounded Tommy returns to the house where he grew up but a street gang attacks, robs and, presumably, kills him.

== Cast ==
- Fred Williamson as Tommy Gibbs
  - Omer Jeffery as Young Tommy Gibbs
- Gloria Hendry as Helen Bradley
- Art Lund as Captain Jack McKinney
- D'Urville Martin as Reverend Rufus Fairchild
- Julius Harris as Thomas "Papa" Gibbs Sr.
- Minnie Gentry as Abby Gibbs
- Philip Roye as Joe "The Brain" Washington
  - Michael Jeffery as Young Joe Washington
- William Wellman Jr. as Alfred Coleman
- James Dixon as "Irish" Bryant
- Val Avery as Cardoza
- Patrick McAllister as Grossfield
- Don Pedro Colley as "Crawdaddy"
- Myrna Hansen as Virginia Coleman

== Production ==
The film script was originally commissioned by Sammy Davis Jr. According to Larry Cohen, Davis "wanted to do a picture in which he was the star, instead of being a flunky to Frank Sinatra and Dean Martin. So I suggested that they do a gangster movie like Little Caesar, since he was a little guy, and so was Jimmy Cagney, and so was Edward G. Robinson. And I thought he could play a little hoodlum working his way up in the Harlem underworld."

Cohen wrote a treatment for $10,000 but when he finished, Davis could not pay due to some trouble with the Internal Revenue Service. Cohen was approached by Samuel Z. Arkoff of American International Pictures, who were interested in doing an action film that could star a black actor. Cohen produced the treatment he had written for Davis and AIP agreed to finance.

Most of the film was shot in New York, although some interiors were filmed in Los Angeles. Fred Williamson was cast in the lead as Tommy Gibbs. Cohen says, "Fred was totally different than what Sammy would have played, because Fred was a handsome leading man. He looked great in the clothes, and he looked great in that hat that I put on him. And he could strut through Harlem, and he looked like the Godfather of Harlem." Myrna Hansen, who was crowned Miss USA of 1953, was cast by Cohen. They had been neighbors for years when he offered her the role of Virginia Coleman. She would later say that being in that film qualified her for a significant pension increase by the Screen Actors Guild.

Cohen says when he filmed in Harlem the local gangsters threatened to disrupt the shoot unless they were paid off. He offered them small roles in the film instead. "These guys were great," he said. "Anything we wanted, anything we needed to get, they got for me. We kind of owned Harlem after that. And then when the picture finally opened, I put them in the poster too, so that the advertisements in the paper had these guys in it. And opening day at the Cinerama Theater on Broadway, these gangsters were down there in front of the theater signing autographs." The Harlem film sequence was directed by James Signorelli, later to go on to producing films on Saturday Night Live.

Stevie Wonder was originally asked to score the film, but after Cohen screened a rough cut for him, Wonder was worried about being associated with a film so violent, so he declined the job and was replaced by James Brown.

Rick Baker did uncredited makeup effects for the film, most notably a severed ear that Tommy places on Cardoza’s spaghetti at the beginning of the film.

== Release and reception ==
The original cut of the film ended with Tommy Gibbs being beaten, robbed and killed by a black street gang but this scene was removed from general release, appearing only in European releases of the film, until it was restored for home video release and is now generally accepted as the official ending of the film.

Cohen says "The picture did so well that they called me immediately and said, “You’d better get a sequel going before these actors decide they want an enormous amount of money to reappear.” So I said, “You know I don’t have a script, but I can start shooting something, and make it up as I go along.” That’s more or less what we did." The result was Hell Up in Harlem. The sequel contradicts the film's original ending and the two films appear to lack continuity when viewed back-to-back on home video, as Gibbs is still alive in Hell Up in Harlem, despite dying in Black Caesar.

In 2001, it was released on DVD, featuring an audio commentary by director Larry Cohen. In 2010 it was digitized in High Definition (1080i) and broadcast on MGM HD. In 2015, Olive Films released the film on Blu-ray. In 2025, Shout! Studios released the film on 4K Blu Ray as part of the Blaxploitation Collection Vol. 1.

=== Critical reception ===
On the review aggregator website Rotten Tomatoes, 69% of 16 critics' reviews are positive. In 2009, Empire named it 18th in a poll of the "20 Greatest Gangster Movies You've Never Seen* (*Probably)".

=== Legacy ===
Prominent rappers have sampled James Brown's score Black Caesar. "The Boss", which is the background music for a scene in which Tommy Gibbs is shot while crossing a street corner, was sampled for Ice-T's "You Played Yourself" from his 1989 album The Iceberg/Freedom of Speech... Just Watch What You Say!, Nas' "Get Down" from his 2001 album God's Son, Trick Daddy's "Take It to da House" (featuring the Slip-N-Slide Express) from his 2003 album Thugs Are Us and two songs, Down & Out in New York City" and "The Rotten Apple", from Prodigy's 2007 album Return of the Mac.

The film is name-checked in Public Enemy's song "Burn Hollywood Burn" (featuring Ice Cube and Big Daddy Kane) from their 1990 album Fear of a Black Planet; when the cinema announces the movie to be Driving Miss Daisy, guest rapper Big Daddy Kane suggests leaving, saying "I got Black Caesar back at the crib." Kane makes another reference to the movie in his song "How U Get a Record Deal?" from his 1993 album Looks Like a Job For.... Kool Keith references the main character in the song "Keith Turbo" from his 1999 album Black Elvis/Lost in Space: "Take off your shirt; I can see your ribs; Fakin' like Tommy Gibbs."

== See also ==
- List of American films of 1973
- List of blaxploitation films
