= Blaxploitation =

Film genre

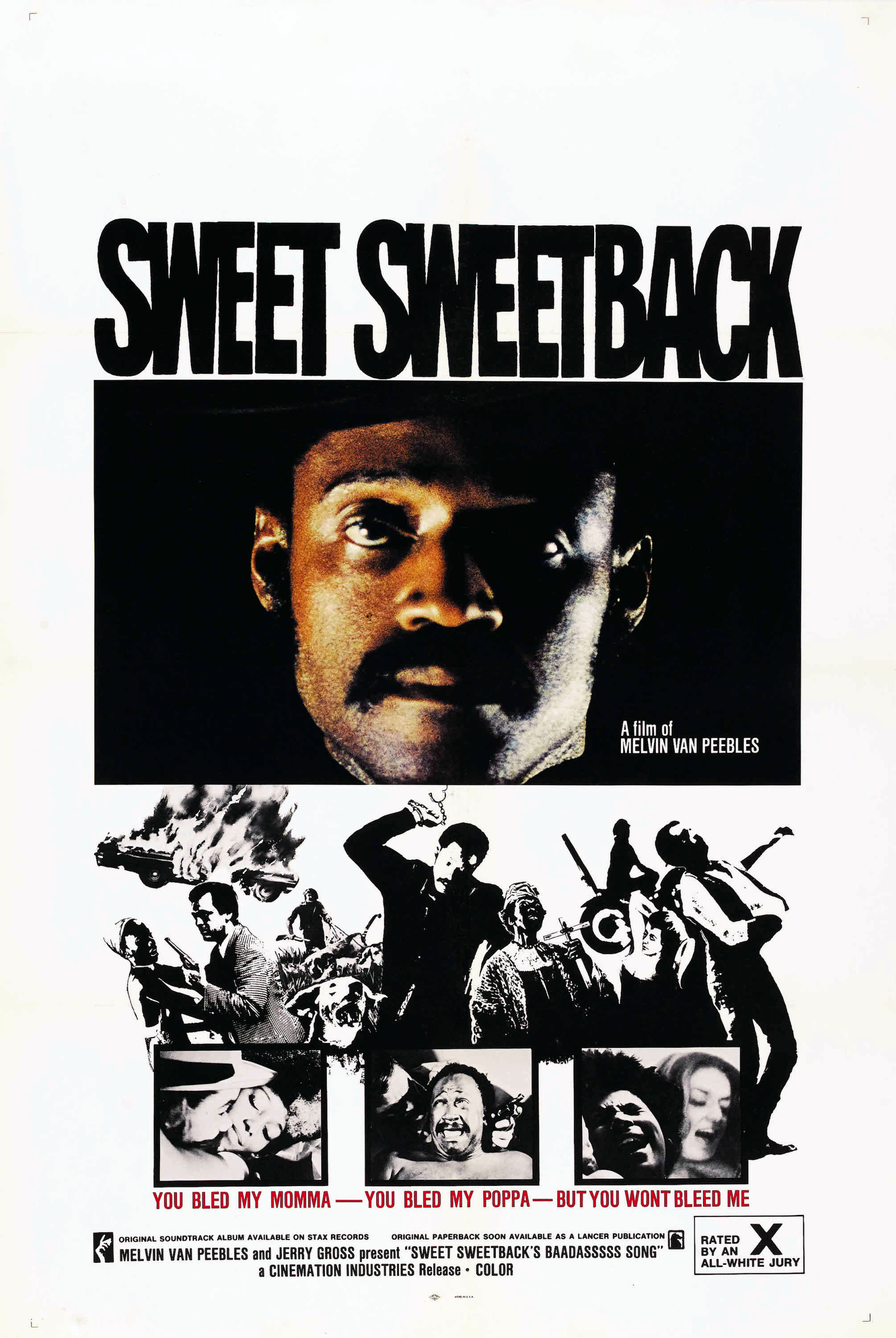
- Poster of Sweet Sweetback's Baadasssss Song (1971), which is often considered to be the first Blaxploitation film
- Years active: 1960s–1970s
- Location: United States
- Major figures: Pam Grier; Richard Roundtree; Melvin Van Peebles; Fred Williamson
- Influences: Exploitation film; race film; Black power movement
- Influenced: Allen and Albert Hughes; Spike Lee; John Singleton; Quentin Tarantino; Hip hop culture

In American cinema, Blaxploitation is the film subgenre of action movie derived from the exploitation film genre that began in the late 1960s and flourished throughout the early to mid-1970s, consequent to the combined cultural momentum of the Black civil rights movement and the Black power movement, political and sociological circumstances that facilitated Black artists reclaiming their power of the representation of the Black ethnic identity in the arts. The term blaxploitation is a portmanteau of the words Black and exploitation, coined by Junius Griffin, president of the Beverly Hills–Hollywood branch of the NAACP in 1972. In criticizing the Hollywood portrayal or mockery of the multiracial society of the US, Griffin said that the blaxploitation genre was "proliferating offenses" to and against the Black community, by perpetuating racist stereotypes of inherent criminality.

After the cultural misrepresentation of Black people in the race films of the 1940s, the 1950s, and the 1960s, the Blaxploitation movie genre presented Black characters and Black communities as the protagonists and the places of the story, rather than as background or secondary characters in the story, such as the Magical Negro or as the victims of criminals. To counter the racist misrepresentations of Blackness in the American movie business, UCLA financially assisted Black students to attend film school. The cultural emergence of the Blaxploitation subgenre was facilitated by the Hollywood movie studios adopting a permissive system of film ratings in 1968.

Initially, blaxploitation films were Black cinema produced for the entertainment of Black people in the cities of the US, but the entertainment appeal of the Black characters and human stories extended into the mainstream cinema of corporate Hollywood according to David Denby, writing in 1972. Recognizing the profitability of the financially inexpensive blaxploitation films, the corporate movie studios then produced blaxploitation movies specifically for the cultural sensibilities of mainstream viewers. The movie-business magazine Variety reported the films Sweet Sweetback's Baadasssss Song (1971) and Shaft (1971) as the mainstream blaxploitation films that followed the assimilation of blaxploitation into mainstream cinema, by way of the film Cotton Comes to Harlem (1970). Blaxploitation films were the first to feature soundtracks of funk and soul music.

== Description ==
=== General themes ===
[S]upercharged, bad-talking, highly romanticized melodramas about Harlem superstuds, the pimps, the private eyes and the pushers who more or less singlehandedly make whitey's corrupt world safe for black pimping, black private-eyeing and black pushing.

— Vincent Canby of The New York Times, 1976

Blaxploitation films set in the Northeast or West Coast mainly take place in poor urban neighborhoods. Derogatory terms for white characters, such as "cracker" and "honky", are commonly used. Blaxploitation films set in the South often deal with slavery and miscegenation. The genre's films are often bold in their statements and use violence, sex, drug trafficking and other shocking qualities to provoke the audience. The films usually portray black protagonists overcoming "The Man" or emblems of the white majority that oppresses the black community.

Blaxploitation includes several subtypes, including crime (Foxy Brown), action/martial arts (Three the Hard Way), Westerns (Boss Nigger), horror (Abby, Blacula), prison (Penitentiary), comedy (Uptown Saturday Night), nostalgia (Five on the Black Hand Side), coming-of-age (Cooley High/Cornbread, Earl and Me), and musical (Sparkle).

Following the example set by Sweet Sweetback's Baadasssss Song, many blaxploitation films feature funk and soul jazz soundtracks with heavy bass, funky beats and wah-wah guitars. These soundtracks are notable for complexity that was not common to the radio-friendly funk tracks of the 1970s. They also often feature a rich orchestration which included flutes and violins.

Blaxploitation was one of the first film categories to have female leads portray brave, heroic, active protagonists. Actresses such as Pam Grier in Coffy and Gloria Hendry in Black Belt Jones opened the door for black women to become action stars, inspiring later films such as Kill Bill and Set It Off.

Following the popularity of these films in the 1970s, movies within other genres began to feature black characters with stereotypical blaxploitation characteristics, such as the Harlem underworld characters in the James Bond film Live and Let Die (1973), Jim Kelly's character in Enter the Dragon (1973) and Fred Williamson's character in The Inglorious Bastards (1978).

=== Black Power ===
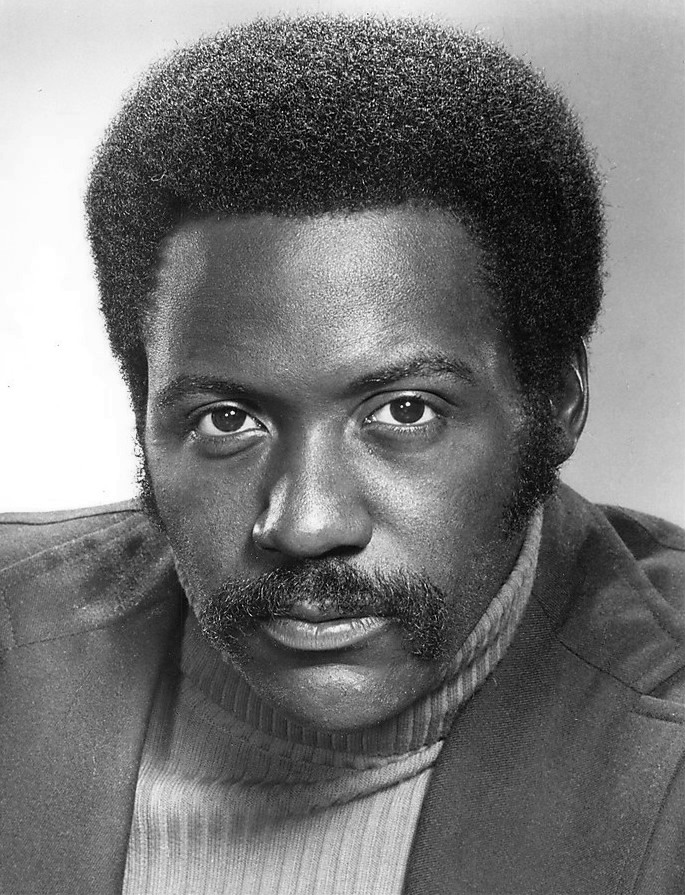
Richard Roundtree as John Shaft

Afeni Shakur claimed that every aspect of culture (including cinema) in the 1960s and 1970s was influenced by the Black Power movement. Sweet Sweetback's Baadasssss Song was one of the first films to incorporate black power ideology and permit black actors to be the stars of their own narratives, rather than being relegated to the stereotypical roles available to them (such as the "mammy" figure and other low-status characters). Films such as Shaft brought the black experience to film in a new way, allowing black political and social issues that had been ignored in cinema to be explored. Shaft and its protagonist, John Shaft, brought African-American culture to the mainstream world. Sweetback and Shaft were both influenced by the black power movement, containing Marxist themes, solidarity and social consciousness alongside the genre-typical images of sex and violence.

Knowing that film could bring about social and cultural change, the Black Power movement seized the genre to highlight black socioeconomic struggles in the 1970s; many such films contained black heroes who were able to overcome the institutional oppression of African-American culture and history. Later films such as Super Fly softened the rhetoric of black power, encouraging resistance within the capitalist system rather than a radical transformation of society. Super Fly still embraced the black nationalist movement in its argument that black and white authority cannot coexist easily.

=== Stereotypes ===
The genre's role in exploring and shaping race relations in the United States has been controversial. Some held that the blaxploitation trend was a token of black empowerment, but others accused the movies of perpetuating common white stereotypes about black people. As a result, many called for the end of the genre. The NAACP, Southern Christian Leadership Conference and National Urban League joined to form the Coalition Against Blaxploitation. Their influence in the late 1970s contributed to the genre's demise. Literary critic Addison Gayle wrote in 1974: "The best example of this kind of nihilism / irresponsibility are the Black films; here is freedom pushed to its most ridiculous limits; here are writers and actors who claim that freedom for the artist entails exploitation of the very people to whom they owe their artistic existence."

Films such as Super Fly and The Mack received intense criticism not only for the stereotype of the protagonist (generalizing pimps as representative of all African-American men, in this case) but for portraying all black communities as hotbeds for drugs and crime.

Blaxploitation films like Shaft, Car Wash, and Super Fly feature hypermasculine women, effeminate men, and 'jester-like' comic relief homosexual caricatures. These depictions have been criticized for reinforcing stereotypical notions of black homosexuality, though some films like Car Wash have been noted in allowing queer characters to respond to pejorative accusations levied against them.

Blaxploitation films such as Mandingo (1975) provided mainstream Hollywood producers, in this case Dino De Laurentiis, a cinematic way to depict plantation slavery with all of its brutal, historical and racial contradictions and controversies, including sex, miscegenation, and rebellion. The story world also depicts the plantation as one of the main origins of boxing as a sport in the U.S.

In the late 1980s and early 1990s, a new wave of acclaimed black film makers, particularly Spike Lee (Do the Right Thing), John Singleton (Boyz n the Hood), and Allen and Albert Hughes (Menace II Society) focused on black urban life in their movies. These directors made use of blaxploitation elements while incorporating implicit criticism of the genre's glorification of stereotypical "criminal" behavior.

Alongside accusations of exploiting stereotypes, the NAACP also criticized the blaxploitation genre of exploiting the black community and culture of America, by creating films for a profit that those communities would never see, despite being the vastly misrepresented main focus of many blaxploitation film plots. Many film professionals still believe that there is no truly equal "Black Hollywood" as evidenced by the "#OscarsSoWhite" scandal in 2015 that caused uproar when no black actors were nominated for "Best Actor" at the Academy Awards.

=== Slavesploitation ===
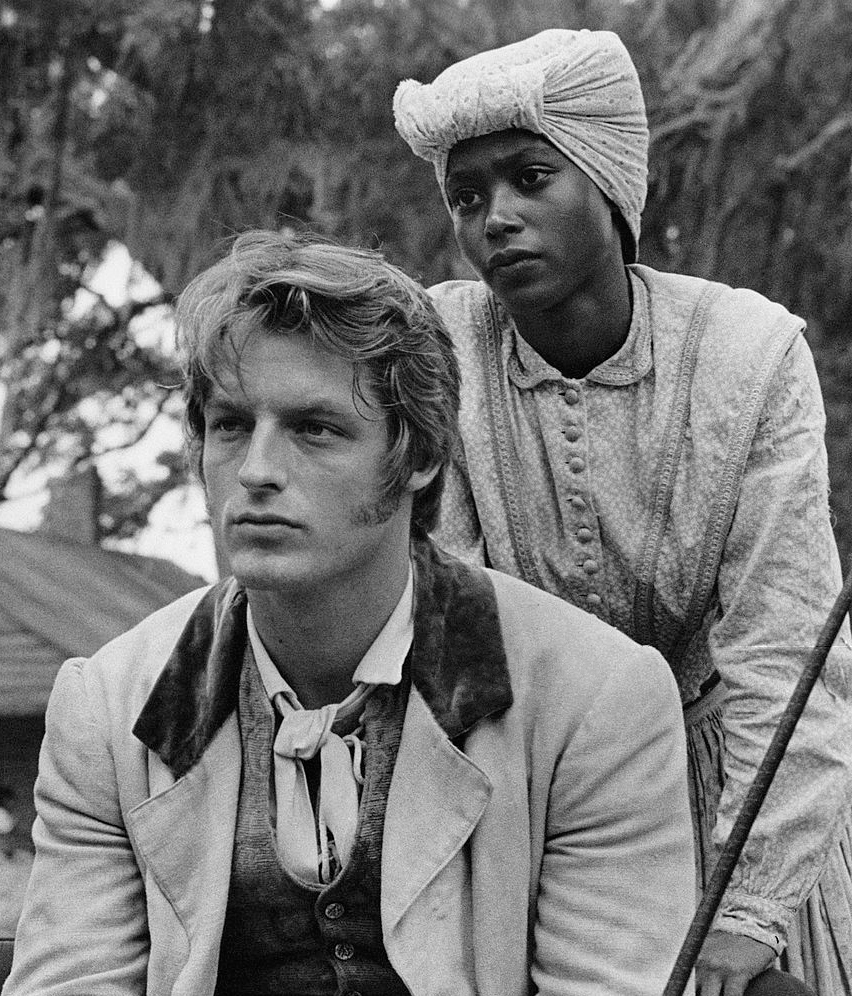
Brenda Sykes and Perry King on the set of Mandingo (1975).

Slavesploitation, a subgenre of blaxploitation in literature and film, flourished briefly in the late 1960s and 1970s. As its name suggests, the genre is characterized by sensationalistic depictions of slavery.

Abrams, arguing that Quentin Tarantino's Django Unchained (2012) finds its historical roots in the slavesploitation genre, observes that slavesploitation films are characterized by "crassly exploitative representations of oppressed slave protagonists".

One early antecedent of the genre is Slaves (1969), which Gaines notes was "not 'slavesploitation' in the vein of later films", but which nonetheless featured graphic depictions of beatings and sexual violence against slaves. Novotny argues that Blacula (1972), although it does not depict slavery directly, is historically linked to the slavesploitation subgenre.

By far, the best-known and best-studied exemplar of slavesploitation is Mandingo, a 1957 novel which was adapted into a 1961 play and a 1975 film. Indeed, Mandingo was so well known that a contemporary reviewer of Die the Long Day, a 1972 novel by Orlando Patterson, called it an example of the "Mandingo genre". The film, panned on its release, has been subject to widely divergent critical assessments. Robin Wood, for instance, argued in 1998 that it is the "greatest film about race ever made in Hollywood, certainly prior to Spike Lee and in some respects still".

== Legacy ==
=== Influence ===
Blaxploitation films have had an enormous and complicated influence on American cinema. Filmmaker and exploitation film fan Quentin Tarantino, for example, has made numerous references to the blaxploitation genre in his films. An early blaxploitation tribute can be seen in the character of "Lite", played by Sy Richardson, in Repo Man (1984). Richardson later wrote Posse (1993), which is a kind of blaxploitation Western.

Some of the later, blaxploitation-influenced movies such as Jackie Brown (1997), Undercover Brother (2002), Austin Powers in Goldmember (2002), Kill Bill Vol. 1 (2003), and Django Unchained (2012) feature pop culture nods to the genre. The parody Undercover Brother, for example, stars Eddie Griffin as an afro-topped agent for a clandestine organization satirically known as the "B.R.O.T.H.E.R.H.O.O.D.". Likewise, Austin Powers in Goldmember co-stars Beyoncé Knowles as the Tamara Dobson/Pam Grier-inspired heroine, Foxxy Cleopatra. In the 1977 parody film The Kentucky Fried Movie, a mock trailer for Cleopatra Schwartz depicts another Grier-like action star married to a rabbi. In a scene in Reservoir Dogs, the protagonists discuss Get Christie Love!, a mid-1970s blaxploitation television series. In the catalytic scene of True Romance, the characters watch the movie The Mack.

John Singleton's Shaft (2000), starring Samuel L. Jackson, is a modern-day interpretation of a classic blaxploitation film. The 1997 film Hoodlum starring Laurence Fishburne portrays a fictional account of black mobster Ellsworth "Bumpy" Johnson and recasts gangster blaxploitation with a 1930s twist. In 2004, Mario Van Peebles released Baadasssss!, about the making of his father Melvin's movie (with Mario playing Melvin). 2007's American Gangster, based on the true story of heroin dealer Frank Lucas, takes place in the early 1970s in Harlem and has many elements similar in style to blaxploitation films, specifically its prominent featuring of the song "Across 110th Street".

Blaxploitation films have profoundly impacted contemporary hip-hop culture. Several prominent hip hop artists, including Snoop Dogg, Big Daddy Kane, Ice-T, Slick Rick, and Too Short, have adopted the no-nonsense pimp persona popularized first by ex-pimp Iceberg Slim's 1967 book Pimp and subsequently by films such as Super Fly, The Mack, and Willie Dynamite. In fact, many hip-hop artists have paid tribute to pimping within their lyrics (most notably 50 Cent's hit single "P.I.M.P.") and have openly embraced the pimp image in their music videos, which include entourages of scantily-clad women, flashy jewelry (known as "bling"), and luxury Cadillacs (referred to as "pimpmobiles"). The most famous scene of The Mack, featuring the "Annual Players Ball", has become an often-referenced pop culture icon—most recently by Chappelle's Show, where it was parodied as the "Playa Hater's Ball". The genre's overseas influence extends to artists such as Norway's hip-hop duo Madcon.

In Michael Chabon's novel Telegraph Avenue, set in 2004, two characters are former blaxploitation stars.

In 1980, opera director Peter Sellars (not to be confused with actor Peter Sellers) produced and directed a staging of Mozart's opera Don Giovanni in the manner of a blaxploitation film, set in contemporary Spanish Harlem, with African-American singers portraying the anti-heroes as street-thugs, killing by gunshot rather than with a sword, using recreational drugs, and partying almost naked. It was later released on commercial video and can be seen on YouTube.

A 2016 video game, Mafia III, is set in the year 1968 and revolves around Lincoln Clay, a mixed-race African-American orphan raised by "black mob". After the murder of his surrogate family at the hands of the Italian mafia, Lincoln Clay seeks vengeance on those who took away the only thing that mattered to him.

=== Cultural references ===
The notoriety of the blaxploitation genre has led to many parodies. The earliest attempts to mock the genre, Ralph Bakshi's Coonskin and Rudy Ray Moore's Dolemite, date back to the genre's heyday in 1975.

Coonskin was intended to deconstruct racial stereotypes, from early minstrel show stereotypes to more recent stereotypes found in blaxploitation film itself. The work stimulated great controversy even before its release when the Congress of Racial Equality challenged it. Even though distribution was handed to a smaller distributor who advertised it as an exploitation film, it soon developed a cult following with black viewers.

Dolemite, less serious in tone and produced as a spoof, centers around a sexually active black pimp played by Rudy Ray Moore, who based the film on his stand-up comedy act. A sequel, The Human Tornado, followed.

Later spoofs parodying the blaxploitation genre include I'm Gonna Git You Sucka, Pootie Tang, Undercover Brother, Black Dynamite, and The Hebrew Hammer, which featured a Jewish protagonist and was jokingly referred to by its director as a "Jewsploitation" film.

Robert Townsend's comedy Hollywood Shuffle features a young black actor who is tempted to take part in a white-produced blaxploitation film.

The satirical book Our Dumb Century features an article from the 1970s entitled "Congress Passes Anti-Blaxploitation Act: Pimps, Players Subject to Heavy Fines".

FOX's network television comedy, MADtv, has frequently spoofed the Rudy Ray Moore-created franchise Dolemite, with a series of sketches performed by comic actor Aries Spears, in the role of "The Son of Dolemite". Other sketches include the characters "Funkenstein", "Dr. Funkenstein" and more recently Condoleezza Rice as a blaxploitation superhero. A recurring theme in these sketches is the inexperience of the cast and crew in the blaxploitation era, with emphasis on ridiculous scripting and shoddy acting, sets, costumes, and editing. The sketches are testaments to the poor production quality of the films, with obvious boom mike appearances and intentionally poor cuts and continuity.

Another of FOX's network television comedies, Martin starring Martin Lawrence, frequently references the blaxploitation genre. In the Season Three episode "All The Players Came", when Martin organizes a "Player's Ball" charity event to save a local theater, several stars of the blaxploitation era, such as Rudy Ray Moore, Antonio Fargas, Dick Anthony Williams and Pam Grier all make cameo appearances. In one scene, Martin, in character as aging pimp "Jerome", refers to Pam Grier as "Sheba, Baby" in reference to her 1975 blaxploitation feature film of the same name.

In the movie Leprechaun in the Hood, a character played by Ice-T pulls a baseball bat from his Afro. This scene alludes to a similar scene in Foxy Brown, in which Pam Grier hides a small semi-automatic pistol in her Afro.

Adult Swim's Aqua Teen Hunger Force series has a recurring character called "Boxy Brown" – a play on Foxy Brown. An imaginary friend of Meatwad, Boxy Brown is a cardboard box with a crudely drawn face with a French cut that dons an afro. Whenever Boxy speaks, '70s funk music, typical of blaxploitation films, plays in the background. The cardboard box also has a confrontational attitude and dialect similar to many heroes of this film genre.

Some of the TVs found in the action video game Max Payne 2: The Fall of Max Payne feature a Blaxploitation-themed parody of the original Max Payne game called Dick Justice, after its main character. Dick behaves much like the original Max Payne (down to the "constipated" grimace and metaphorical speech) but wears an afro and mustache and speaks in Ebonics.

Duck King, a fictional character created for the video game series Fatal Fury, is a prime example of foreign black stereotypes.

The sub-cult movie short Gayniggers from Outer Space is a blaxploitation-like science fiction oddity directed by Danish filmmaker, DJ, and singer Morten Lindberg.

Jefferson Twilight, a character in The Venture Bros., is a parody of the comic-book character Blade (a black, half human, half-vampire vampire hunter), as well as a blaxploitation reference. He has an afro, sideburns, and a mustache. He carries swords, dresses in stylish 1970s clothing, and says that he hunts "Blaculas".

A scene from the Season 9 episode of The Simpsons, "Simpson Tide", shows Homer Simpson watching Exploitation Theatre. A voice-over announces fake movie titles such as The Blunch Black of Blotre Blame.

Martha Southgate's 2005 novel Third Girl from the Left is set in Hollywood during the era of blaxploitation films and references many blaxploitation films and stars such as Pam Grier and Coffy.

== Notable blaxploitation films ==
=== 1968 ===
- Uptight, (dir. Jules Dassin) was intended as an updated version of John Ford's 1935 film The Informer, based on the book of the same name by Liam O'Flaherty, but the setting was transposed from Dublin to Cleveland. The soundtrack was performed by Booker T. & the MG's. This movie follows the story of a Black nationalist organization in Cleveland (largely based in the Hough and Glenville neighborhoods) that becomes disillusioned with non-violence after the assassination of Dr. Martin Luther King Jr and prepares for urban guerilla warfare.

=== 1970 ===
- The Black Angels is about a black motorcycle gang and is part of the outlaw biker film genre.
- They Call Me MISTER Tibbs! A sequel to In the Heat of the Night, it is a pre-Shaft blaxploitation, and stylistically different from the original film.
- Carter's Army is a television film about a unit of black soldiers in World War II.
- Cotton Comes to Harlem (dir. Ossie Davis) is based on a novel by Chester Himes. Features two black NYPD detectives, Coffin Ed Johnson (Raymond St. Jacques) and Gravedigger Jones (Godfrey Cambridge), on the hunt for a money-filled cotton bale stolen by a corrupt reverend named Deke O'Malley.

=== 1971 ===
- Sweet Sweetback's Baadasssss Song is written, produced, scored, directed by and stars Melvin Van Peebles. The hero, named Sweetback because of his sexual powers, is an apolitical sex worker. His pimp, Beadle, makes a deal with a couple of police officers to let them take Sweetback into the station so it looks like the cops are picking up suspects. While Sweetback is in custody, the police arrest a young black militant and take him to a rural area to torture him. Sweetback steps in and beats the police unconscious. With the police chasing him, Sweetback comes to understand the power of the black community sticking together. He uses his ingenuity and survival skills to outwit the police and escape to Mexico. Music by Earth, Wind & Fire.
- Shaft (dir. Gordon Parks) features Richard Roundtree as detective John Shaft. The soundtrack features contributions from Isaac Hayes, whose recording of the titular song won several awards, including an Academy Award. Shaft was deemed culturally relevant by the Library of Congress, and it spawned two sequels, Shaft's Big Score (1972) and Shaft in Africa (1973), as well as a short-lived TV series starring Roundtree. The concept was revived in 2000 with an all-new sequel starring Samuel L. Jackson as the nephew of the original John Shaft, with Roundtree reprising his role as the original Shaft. A direct sequel to the 2000 film was released in 2019, also titled Shaft.
- The Bus Is Coming is a drama about a young black soldier who returns home to Los Angeles from combat in Vietnam to find out that his brother had been killed by a gang of racist cops. He struggles between maintaining his beliefs surrounding liberalism and centrism, or being radicalized from his brother's death, and possibly joining the black nationalist organization the Black Fist. This movie was directed by Wendell James Franklin and starred Mike B. Simms and, Burl Bullock.

=== 1972 ===
- Come Back, Charleston Blue, starring Godfrey Cambridge and Raymond St. Jacques, loosely based on Chester Himes' novel The Heat's On. It is a sequel to the 1970 film Cotton Comes to Harlem. All tracks written by Donny Hathaway except "Little Ghetto Boy"
- Hit Man (dir. George Armitage) is the story of an Oakland hit man, played by former NFL player Bernie Casey, who comes to Los Angeles after his brother is murdered. He learns that his niece has been forced into pornography. She is eventually murdered. He sets out to murder everyone directly involved, from a porn star (Pam Grier), to a theater owner (Ed Cambridge), to a man he looked up to as a child (Rudy Challenger), and a mobster (Don Diamond).
- Super Fly (dir. Gordon Parks Jr.) features a soundtrack by Curtis Mayfield. Super Fly is one of the most controversial, profitable and popular classics of the genre.
- The Legend of Nigger Charley (dir. Martin Goldman) is written by, co-produced by and stars Fred Williamson. It was followed by the sequel The Soul of Nigger Charley (1973).
- Hammer (dir. Bruce D. Clark) stars Fred Williamson as B.J. Hammer, a boxer who gets mixed up with a crooked manager who wants him to throw a fight for the Mafia.
- Across 110th Street (dir. Barry Shear) is a crime thriller about two detectives (played by Anthony Quinn and Yaphet Kotto) who try to catch a group of robbers who stole $300,000 from the Mob before the Mob catches up with them. The title track by Bobby Womack reached #19 on the Billboard Black Singles Chart.
- Black Mama, White Mama is a women in prison film partly inspired by The Defiant Ones (1958) starring Pam Grier and Margaret Markov in the roles originated by Sidney Poitier and Tony Curtis.
- Blacula is a take on Dracula which features an African prince (played by William H. Marshall) who is bitten and imprisoned by Count Dracula. Once freed from his coffin, he spreads terror in modern-day Los Angeles.
- Melinda (dir. Hugh Robertson) features music by Jerry Peters and Jerry Butler.
- Slaughter stars Jim Brown as an ex-Green Beret who seeks revenge against a crime syndicate for the murder of his parents. It spawned the sequel, Slaughter's Big Rip-Off (1973).
- Trouble Man stars Robert Hooks as "Mr. T.", a hard-edged private detective who tends to take justice into his own hands. Although the film itself was unsuccessful, it did enjoy a successful soundtrack written, produced and performed by Motown artist Marvin Gaye.
- The Final Comedown (dir. Oscar Williams) features music by Grant Green and Wade Marcus, and stars Billy Dee Williams. The film is an examination of racism in the United States and depicts a shootout between a radical black nationalist group and the police, with the backstory leading up to the shootout told through flashbacks.
- Black Gunn is a 1972 American neo-noir crime thriller film, directed by Robert Hartford-Davis and starring Jim Brown, Martin Landau, Brenda Sykes, Herbert Jefferson Jr. and Luciana Paluzzi. The film is considered an entry blaxploitation sub-genre, but is unique to the genre in several different ways. The film is set in Los Angeles where a nighttime robbery of an illegal mafia bookmaking operation is carried out by the militant African-American organization BAG (Black Action Group). Though successful, several of the bookmakers and one of the burglars are killed. The mastermind behind the robbery, a Vietnam veteran named Scott, is the brother of a prominent nightclub owner, Gunn. Seeking safe haven, Scott hides out at his brother's mansion after a brief reunion.

=== 1973 ===
- Black Caesar, Tommy Gibbs (Fred Williamson) is a street-smart hoodlum who has worked his way up to being the crime boss of Harlem. Music by James Brown.
- Blackenstein is a parody of Frankenstein and features a black Frankenstein's monster.
- Cleopatra Jones stars Tamara Dobson as a karate-chopping government agent, with the mutual support of the Black Nationalist B&S (Brothers & Sisters) House. A sequel, Cleopatra Jones and the Casino of Gold, was released in 1975.
- Coffy, Pam Grier stars as Coffy, a nurse turned vigilante who takes revenge on all those who hooked her 11-year-old sister on heroin. Coffy marks Grier's biggest hit and was re-worked for Foxy Brown, Friday Foster and Sheba Baby.
- Detroit 9000 is set in Detroit, MI and features street-smart white detective Danny Bassett (Alex Rocco) who teams with educated black detective Sgt. Jesse Williams (Hari Rhodes) to investigate the theft of $400,000 at a fund-raiser for Representative Aubrey Hale Clayton (Rudy Challenger). Championed by Quentin Tarantino, it was released on video by Miramax in April 1999.
- Gordon's War stars Paul Winfield as a Vietnam vet who recruits ex-Army buddies to fight the Harlem drug dealers and pimps responsible for the heroin-fueled death of his wife.
- Hell Up in Harlem is the sequel to Black Caesar and stars Fred Williamson and Gloria Hendry, with a soundtrack by Motown singer Edwin Starr.
- Live and Let Die, a James Bond movie directed by Guy Hamilton and starring Roger Moore. Many of the villains and allies are based on stock blaxploitation characters.
- The Mack is a film starring Max Julien and Richard Pryor. It was produced during the era of such Blaxploitations as Dolemite. It is not considered by its makers a true blaxploitation picture. It is more a social commentary according to Mackin' Ain't Easy, a documentary about the making of The Mack, which can be found on the DVD edition of the film. The movie tells the story of the life of John Mickens (a.k.a. Goldie), a former drug dealer recently released from prison who becomes a big-time pimp. Standing in his way is another pimp: Pretty Tony. Two corrupt white cops, a local crime lord, and his own brother (a black nationalist), all try to force him out of the business. Set in Oakland, California, it was the highest grossing blaxploitation of its time. Its soundtrack was recorded by Motown artist Willie Hutch.
- Scream Blacula Scream is the sequel to Blacula. William H. Marshall reprises his role as Blacula/Mamuwalde.
- The Spook Who Sat By the Door was adapted from Sam Greenlee's novel of the same name, directed by Ivan Dixon, with music by Herbie Hancock. A token black CIA employee, who is secretly a black nationalist, leaves his position to train a street gang in CIA tactics and guerilla warfare to become an army of "freedom fighters". The film was reportedly pulled from distribution because of its politically controversial message and depictions of an American race war. Until its 2004 DVD release, it was hard to find, save for infrequent bootleg VHS copies. In 2012, the film was included in the USA Library of Congress National Film Registry.
- Superfly TNT (dir. Ron O'Neil)
- That Man Bolt, starring Fred Williamson, is the first spy film in this genre, combining elements of James Bond with martial arts action in an international setting.
- Trick Baby is based on the book of the same name by ex-pimp Iceberg Slim.
- Willie Dynamite, Roscoe Orman (Gordon from Sesame Street fame) plays a pimp. As in many blaxploitation films, the lead character drives a customized Cadillac Eldorado Coupe (the same car was used in Magnum Force).

=== 1974 ===
- Abby is a version of The Exorcist and stars Carol Speed as a virtuous young woman possessed by a demon. Ms. Speed also sings the title song. William H. Marshall (of Blacula fame) conducts the exorcism of Abby on the floor of a discotheque. A hit in its time, it was later pulled from the theaters after Warner Bros. successfully sued AIP over copyright issues.
- Black Belt Jones, Jim Kelly, who is better known for his role as "Mister Williams" in the Bruce Lee film Enter the Dragon, is given a leading role. He plays Black Belt Jones, a federal agent/martial arts expert who takes on the mob with the support of a Black Nationalist organization, the "Black Student Union", as he avenges the murder of a karate school owner.
- Black Eye is an action-mystery starring Fred Williamson as a private detective investigating murders connected with a drug ring.
- The Black Godfather stars Rod Perry as a man rising to underworld power based on The Godfather.
- The Black Six is about a black motorcycle gang seeking revenge. It combines blaxploitation and outlaw biker film.
- The Education of Sonny Carson is a blaxploitation drama based on the autobiography of the same name by Sonny Carson.
- Claudine: Music by Curtis Mayfield and Gladys Knight & the Pips. Cast/Diahann Carroll.
- Foxy Brown is largely a remake of the hit film Coffy. Pam Grier once again on a vendetta against a drug ring, who seeks help from the Black Panthers. Originally written as a sequel to Coffy, the film's working title was Burn, Coffy, Burn!. The soundtrack was recorded by Willie Hutch.
- Get Christie Love! is a TV movie later released to some theaters. This police drama, starring an attractive young black woman (Teresa Graves) as an undercover cop, was later made into a short-lived TV series.
- Johnny Tough stars Dion Gossett and Renny Roker.
- Space Is the Place is a psychedelically themed blaxploitation film featuring Sun Ra & His Intergalactic Solar Arkestra.
- Sugar Hill is set in Houston and features a female fashion photographer (played by Marki Bey) who wreaks revenge on the local crime Mafia that murdered her fiancé with the use of voodoo magic.
- Three the Hard Way features three black men (Fred Williamson, Jim Kelly, and Jim Brown) who must stop a white supremacist plot to eliminate all blacks with a serum in the water supply. Directed by Gordon Parks Jr.
- Three Tough Guys stars Isaac Hayes and music by Isaac Hayes.
- TNT Jackson stars Jean Bell (one of the first black Playboy playmates) and is partly set in Hong Kong. It is notable for blending blaxploitation with the then-popular "chop-socky" martial arts genre.
- Together Brothers is set in Galveston, Texas, where a street gang solves the murder of a police officer (played by Ed Bernard) who had been a mentor to the gang leader. This was the first blaxploitation film to feature a transgender character as the villain. Galveston, TX native Barry White composed the score. The soundtrack features music by the Love Unlimited Orchestra.
- Truck Turner (dir. Jonathan Kaplan) stars Isaac Hayes, Yaphet Kotto and Nichelle Nichols. A former football player turned bounty hunter is pitted against a powerful prostitution crime syndicate in Los Angeles. Music by Isaac Hayes.

=== 1975 ===
- Sheba, Baby, a female private eye (Pam Grier) tries to help her father save his loan business from a gang of thugs.
- The Black Gestapo, Rod Perry plays General Ahmed, who has started an inner-city People's Army to try to relieve the misery of the citizens of Watts, Los Angeles. When the Mafia moves in, they establish a military-style squad.
- Boss Nigger, along with his friend Amos (D'Urville Martin), Boss Nigger (Fred Williamson) takes over the vacated position of Sheriff in a small western town in this Western blaxploitation film. Because of its controversial title, it was released in some markets as The Boss, The Black Bounty Killer or The Black Bounty Hunter.
- Coonskin (dir. Ralph Bakshi) is a controversial animated/live-action film about Br'er Fox, Br'er Rabbit and Br'er Bear in a blaxploitation parody of Disney's Song of the South. It features the voice of Barry White as Br'er Bear.
- Darktown Strutters (dir. William Witney) is a farce produced by Roger Corman's brother, Gene. A Colonel Sanders-type figure with a chain of urban fried chicken restaurants is trying to wipe out the black race by making them impotent through his drugged fried chicken.
- Dr. Black, Mr. Hyde is the retelling of the Jekyll and Hyde tale, starring Bernie Casey.
- Dolemite is also the name of its principal character, played by Rudy Ray Moore, who co-wrote the script. Moore had developed the alter-ego as a stand-up comedian and released several comedy albums using this persona. The film was directed by D'Urville Martin, who appears as the villain Willie Green. The film has attained cult status, earning it a following and making it more well-known than many of its counterparts. A sequel, The Human Tornado, was released in 1976.
- Mandingo is based on a series of lurid Civil War novels and focuses on the abuses of slavery and the sexual relations between slaves and slave owners. It features Richard Ward and Ken Norton. It was followed by a sequel, Drum (1976) starring Pam Grier.
- The Candy Tangerine Man opens with pageantry pimp Baron (John Daniels) driving his customized two-tone red and yellow Rolls-Royce around downtown L.A at night. His ladies have been coming up short lately and he wants to know why. It turns out that two L.A.P.D. cops - Dempsey and Gordon, who have been after Baron for some time now, have resorted to rousting his girls every chance they get. Indeed, in the next scene they have set Baron up with a cop in drag to entrap him with procurement of prostitutes.
- Lady Cocoa (dir. Matt Cimber) stars Lola Falana.
- Let's Do It Again, Music: Composed by Curtis Mayfield.
- Welcome Home Brother Charles. After being released from prison, a wrongfully imprisoned black man takes vengeance on those who previously crossed him by strangling them with his penis.

=== 1976 ===
- Black Shampoo is a take-off of the Warren Beatty hit Shampoo.
- Death of a Snowman is an international action-crime thriller produced in South Africa during the apartheid era, starring Nigel Davenport, Ken Gampu and Bima Stagg; it is recognized as a rare instance of a homegrown African production adopting blaxploitation conventions.
- Ebony, Ivory & Jade (dir. Cirio Santiago) (also known as She Devils in Chains, American Beauty Hostages, Foxfire, Foxforce), features three female athletes who are kidnapped during an international track meet in Hong Kong and fight their way to freedom. This is another cross-genre blend of blaxploitation and martial arts action films.
- The Muthers is another Cirio Santiago combination of Filipino martial arts action and women-in-prison elements. Jeanne Bell and Jayne Kennedy rescue prisoners held at an evil coffee plantation.
- Passion Plantation (a.k.a. Black Emmanuel, White Emmanuel) is a blend of the Mandingo and Emmanuelle, erotic films with interracial sex and savagery.
- Velvet Smooth, Johnnie Hill is a female private detective hired to infiltrate the criminal underworld.
- The Human Tornado a.k.a. Dolemite II, Rudy Ray Moore reprises his role as Dolemite in the sequel to the 1975 film Dolemite.
- J. D.'s Revenge, Isaac Hendrix, a law student is possessed by J.D. Walker, a dead gangster who seeks revenge for his murder 34 years ago.
- Car Wash, is an episodic comedy with an ensemble cast. Notable for its Grammy Award-winning soundtrack by the funk group Rose Royce.

=== 1977 ===
- Black Fist features a street fighter who goes to work for a white gangster and a corrupt cop. The film is in the public domain. Cast members include Richard Lawson and Dabney Coleman.
- Black Samurai (dir. Al Adamson) is based on a novel of the same name by Marc Olden, and stars Jim Kelly. The script is credited to B. Readick, with additional story ideas from Marco Joachim.
- Bare Knuckles stars Robert Viharo, Sherry Jackson and Gloria Hendry. The film is written and directed by Don Edmonds and follows L.A. bounty hunter Zachary Kane (Viharo) on the hunt for a masked serial killer.
- Fight for Your Life is a home invasion thriller about three escaped convicts holding a black minister and his family hostage.
- Petey Wheatstraw (a.k.a. Petey Wheatstraw, the Devil's Son-In-Law) is written by Cliff Roquemore and stars popular blaxploitation genre comedian Rudy Ray Moore along with Jimmy Lynch, Leroy Daniels, Ernest Mayhand and Ebony Wright. It is typical of Moore's other films of the era, Dolemite and The Human Tornado, in that it features Moore's rhyming dialogue.

=== 1978 ===
- Death Dimension is a martial arts film directed by Al Adamson and starring Jim Kelly, Harold Sakata, George Lazenby, Terry Moore, and Aldo Ray. The film also goes by the names Death Dimensions, Freeze Bomb, Icy Death, The Kill Factor and Black Eliminator. A scientist, Professor Mason, invents a powerful freezing bomb for a gangster leader nicknamed "The Pig" (Sakata).
- The Wiz is a musical fantasy film that reimagines The Wonderful Wizard of Oz with an African-American cast and themes.

=== 1979 ===
- Disco Godfather, also known as The Avenging Disco Godfather, is an action film starring Rudy Ray Moore and Carol Speed. Moore's character, a retired cop, owns and operates a disco and tries to shut down the local angel dust dealer after his nephew becomes hooked on the drug.
- Penitentiary (dir. Jamaa Franklin) follows the travails of Martel "Too Sweet" Gordone (Leon Isaac Kennedy) after his wrongful imprisonment. Set in a prison, the film exploits all of the tropes of the genre, including violence, sexuality and the eventual triumph of the lead character.

=== Post-1970s Blaxploitation films ===
- The Last Dragon (1985) is a martial arts action film with blaxploitation elements.
- I'm Gonna Git You Sucka (1988) is a comedic spoof of classic 1970s blaxploitation and features many of its stars: Jim Brown, Bernie Casey, Antonio Fargas and Isaac Hayes.
- Action Jackson (1988) is a film where the protagonist Jericho Jackson (Carl Weathers), uses catchphrases to taunt his opponents. Craig T. Nelson, Sharon Stone and Vanity also star.
- Ghost Dad (1990) is family movie with supernatural elements starring Bill Cosby.
- Tales from the Hood (1995, dir. Rusty Cundiff) is a Comedy horror anthology film with Urban themes.
- Original Gangstas (1996) brings together 1970s blaxploitation stars Pam Grier, Richard Roundtree, Fred Williamson and Jim Brown.
- Jackie Brown (1997, dir. Quentin Tarantino) stars Pam Grier and Samuel L. Jackson in an homage to the blaxploitation genre. Based on the Elmore Leonard novel Rum Punch, Tarantino's title change, casting of Grier and 1970s-style poster art, are all references to Grier's 1974 film Foxy Brown.
- Pootie Tang (2001) incorporates many blaxploitation elements comedically.
- The Return of Dolemite (2002), the third chapter of the Dolemite series, later retitled as The Dolemite Explosion for the DVD release.
- Undercover Brother (2002) is a comedy starring Eddie Griffin as a blaxploitation-style secret agent.
- Full Clip (2004) is made in the graphic novel style.
- Hookers In Revolt (2008, dir. Sean Weathers). With its prevalence of pimps and prostitutes, it is an inventive throwback to early 1970s blaxploitation.
- Black Dynamite (2009) stars Michael Jai White and spoofs blaxploitation films.
- Proud Mary (2018) is an action thriller starring Taraji P. Henson and Danny Glover.
- Get Christie Love! (2018), a made-for-TV remake of the 1974 film starring Kylie Bunbury which, unlike the original, was never picked up for a TV series.
- Superfly (2018) is a remake of the 1972 film, starring Trevor Jackson and Jason Mitchell.
- Undercover Brother 2 (2019), a sequel to the 2002 film starring Michael Jai White.
- The Harder They Fall (2021) is a Netflix Western film starring Jonathan Majors and Idris Elba.
- They Cloned Tyrone (2023) is Netflix Afrofuturistic neo-Blaxploitation film starring John Boyega, Teyonah Parris and Jamie Foxx.
- Sinners (2025) is a horror with musical elements set in 1930s USA starring Michael B. Jordan in dual role.

=== Other ===
- Baadasssss! (2003), a biopic about the making of Sweet Sweetback's Baadasssss Song, starring Mario Van Peebles.
- Dolemite Is My Name (2019), a biopic about the making of Dolemite, starring Eddie Murphy as Rudy Ray Moore.

== See also ==
- Hood film
- Race film
- Race record
- List of blaxploitation films
- List of topics related to Black and African people § Cinema and theater
- Stereotypes of African-Americans § Film and television
- Post-civil rights era African-American history
