= Get Carter (disambiguation) =

Get Carter is a 1971 British film starring Michael Caine.

Get Carter may also refer to:

== Related to the 1971 film ==
- Get Carter (2000 film), a remake of the 1971 movie
- Get Carter (novel) (originally: Jack's Return Home), a novel by Ted Lewis; basis for the films

== Television episodes ==
- "Get Carter" (ER)
- "Get Carter" (Person of Interest)
- "Get Carter!" (Robin Hood)

== Music ==
- "Get Carter", an instrumental track on the 1981 album Dare by the Human League
