= John Lupton =

American actor

John Rollin Lupton
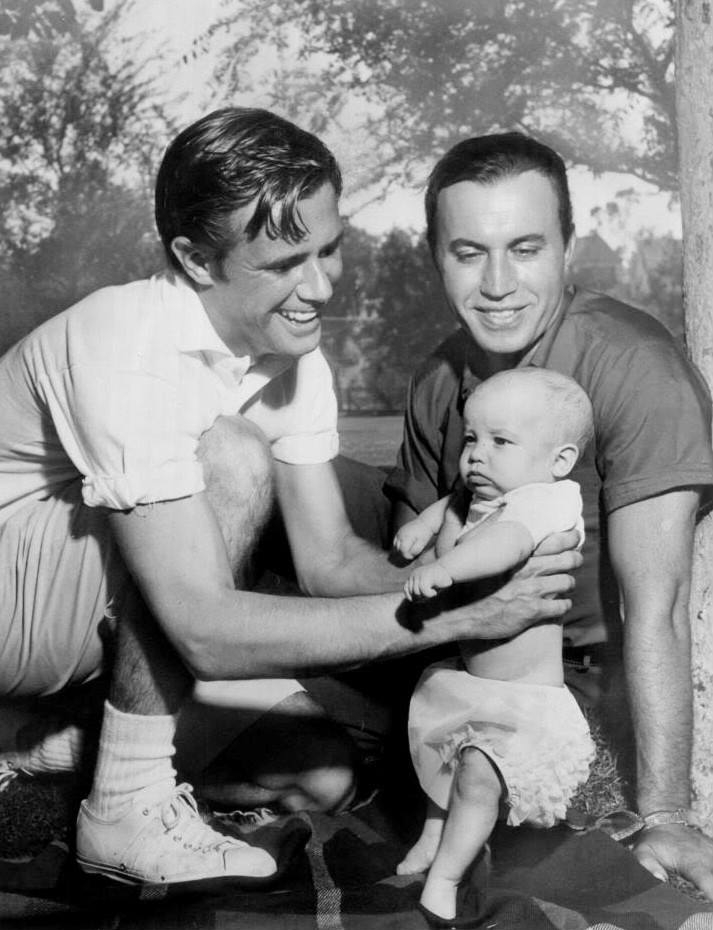
- Lupton with daughter Rollin and Broken Arrow co-star Michael Ansara, 1957.
- Born: August 23, 1928
- Died: November 3, 1993 (aged 65)
- Education: American Academy of Dramatic Arts
- Years active: 1951–1993
- Spouses: Anne Sills (m. 1956; div. 1959) Dian Friml (m. 1969)
- Children: 1

John Rollin Lupton (August 23, 1928 – November 3, 1993) was an American film and television actor.

== Early years ==
Lupton was the son of Adelma and Dorothy (née Marsh) Lupton. He developed an interest in drama while he was a student at Shorewood High School in Shorewood, Wisconsin. He pursued acting via an apprenticeship with a stock theater company in New York, and after graduating he toured with the Strawbridge Children's Theater Company.

== Career ==
After completing his studies at the American Academy of Dramatic Arts in New York, Lupton performed with stock companies in Ocean City, New Jersey and Saratoga Springs, New York. He later joined MGM in Hollywood, making his film debut in On the Town in 1949.

He co-starred in 1956 with Fess Parker in Disney's The Great Locomotive Chase. During the 1954–1955 television season, Lupton appeared as a college student in several episodes of the CBS sitcom, The Halls of Ivy. He also played Chris Lambert on the NBC series Fury (1955–1960), Indian agent Tom Jeffords on the TV series Broken Arrow (1956–1958), and Frank on the ABC serial Never Too Young (1965–1966).

In 1959, John Lupton was cast as a struggling writer in The Rebel Set. That same year, he played the historical figure Buffalo Bill Cody in the episode "The Grand Duke" of the syndicated anthology series, Death Valley Days. The episode revolves around the friendship that forms when the skeptical Buffalo Bill Cody was assigned by the United States Army to escort the Grand Duke of Russia on a buffalo hunt in the West. In 1961, John Lupton was cast in another episode of Death Valley Days titled "South of Horror Flats," where he portrayed Pinkerton agent Allen Hodges, who is hired by a ghost-plagued woman to assist her and her gold fortune in traveling to San Francisco.

In 1960, John Lupton guest-starred as Andrew Sykes in the episode "The Triple Cross" of the syndicated crime drama, U.S. Marshal During the same year, he appeared in other programs, including Sea Hunt, Men into Space, Richard Diamond, Private Detective, Gunsmoke as Ben Tolliver and in another role as Carl, as well as Tales of Wells Fargo and Checkmate.

On April 25, 1961, John Lupton portrayed Fred Powers in the episode "Killers' Odds" of NBC's Laramie. In this episode, series character Jess Harper, played by Robert Fuller, encounters Powers, a stranger with a bounty on his head due to a fraudulent charge, as he had killed in self-defense. In 1961, Lupton also took on the role of Dr. John "Buzz" Neldrum in the episode "A Doctor Comes to Town" of the comedy-drama Window on Main Street, which starred Robert Young as an author returning to his hometown after the loss of his wife and child. Additionally, Lupton guest-starred as Amber in the 1961 episode "The Platinum Highway" of ABC's crime drama Target: The Corruptors. He appeared in the 1965 episode "What Television Show Does Your Dog Watch?" of the CBS sitcom The Cara Williams Show and also made an appearance on NBC's Daniel Boone

Lupton later appeared in the 1965 biblical film The Greatest Story Ever Told as the speaker of the town of Capernaum, and as Jesse James in the 1966 cult horror Western, Jesse James Meets Frankenstein's Daughter.

His later film career included roles in The Day of the Wolves (1971), The Astronaut (1972), Cool Breeze (1972), Napoleon and Samantha (1972), The Slams (1973), The Phantom of Hollywood (1974) and Airport 1975 (1974).

Other film appearances were in Disney's The World's Greatest Athlete (1973) as the race starter, The Whiz Kid and the Carnival Caper (1976), The Young Runaways (1978) and The Secret of Lost Valley (1980).

He was featured from 1967 to 1980 on the daytime soap opera Days of Our Lives in a central role Dr. Tom (Tommy) Horton Jr.

== Walk of Fame ==
John Lupton has a star on the Hollywood Walk of Fame located on the west side of the 1700 block of Vine Street.

== Personal life ==
On April 7, 1956, Lupton married Anne Sills, and they had a daughter, Rollin. They divorced three years later, and on July 24, 1969, he wed Dian Friml in Las Vegas, Nevada, to whom he was still married at the time of his death.

== Death ==
Lupton died on November 3, 1993, aged 65. His widow, Dian, died of cancer in 2005, aged 69. He was cremated, with his family receiving his ashes.

== Filmography ==
Year	Title	Role	Notes
1951	St. Benny the Dip	Seminary Student	Uncredited
1952	Shadow in the Sky	Clayton	
1953	Rogue's March	Lieutenant Jersey	
1953	The Story of Three Loves	Studious Young Ship Passenger	(segment "The Jealous Lover"), Uncredited
1953	Julius Caesar	Varro	
1953	Scandal at Scourie	Artemus	
1953	The Band Wagon	Jack, Prompter	Uncredited
1953	All the Brothers Were Valiant	Dick Morrell	
1953	Escape from Fort Bravo	Bailey	
1954	Dragonfly Squadron	Captain Woody Taylor	
1954	Prisoner of War	Lieutenant Peter Reilly	
1955	Battle Cry	Private / Corporal Marion 'Sister Mary' Hotchkiss	
1955	Seven Angry Men	Lieutenant Jeb Stuart	Uncredited
1955	Man with the Gun	Jeff Castle	
1956	Glory	Chad Chadburn	
1956	Diane	Regnault	
1956	The Great Locomotive Chase	William Pittenger	
1956–1958	Broken Arrow	Indian Agent Tom Jeffords	72 episodes
1957	Drango	Captain Marc Banning	
1957	Taming Sutton's Gal	Frank McClary	
1958	Gun Fever	Simon Weller	
1959	The Man in the Net	Brad Carey	
1959	The Rebel Set	Ray Miller	
1959	The Restless Gun		Season 2 Episode 23: "Ricochet"
1959	Blood and Steel	Lieutenant Dave Jenson	
1960	Three Came to Kill	Hal Parker	
1961	The Clown and the Kid	Peter	
1962	Alfred Hitchcock Presents	Ralph Morrow	Season 7 Episode 32: "Victim Four"
1964	Rawhide		"Incident of the Wonderer", Season 6 Episode 21
1964	The Devil's Bedroom	Jim	
1965	The Greatest Story Ever Told	Speaker of Capernaum	
1966	Jesse James Meets Frankenstein's Daughter	Jesse James	
1967	Dragnet	Sergeant Carl Maxwell	Season 2 Episode 6: "The Big Frustration"
1971	The Day of the Wolves	Hank	
1972	The Astronaut	Tom Masters	Television film
1972	Cool Breeze	Lieutenant Holster	
1972	Napoleon and Samantha	Pete	
1972	Private Parts	Second Policeman	
1972	Hit Man	Director Shooting Sherwood's TV Commercial	
1973	The World's Greatest Athlete	Race Starter	
1973	The Slams	Detective Sergeant	Uncredited
1974	Airport 1975	Oringer	
1976	Midway	Officer Testing Electric Bomb Release	Uncredited
1994	Body Shot	Noah Goodman	
