= Crime film =

Film genre

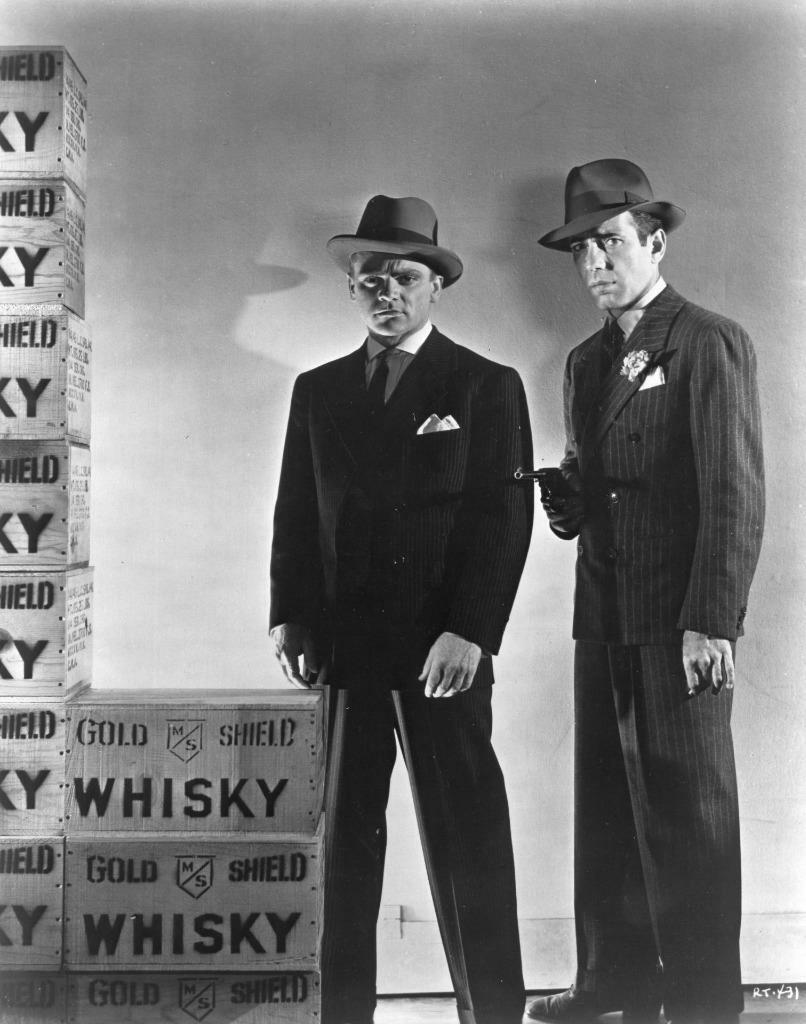
James Cagney and Humphrey Bogart in a promotional still for the crime film The Roaring Twenties (1939).

The crime film is a genre whose films feature the element of crime as key to the films' plot, although not every film centered on a criminal act is classified within the genre. Crime films explore the relationship between crime, law, and society, examining the destruction caused by criminal activity and the social conditions it occurs under. The genre also focuses on the consequences of crime for individuals and communities.

Crime films featuring criminal gangs appeared during the silent film era in American productions. These films portrayed criminals as tragic heroes. Before Little Caesar (1931), American gangster films frequently incorporated elements of romance. European films of the period explored the mystique of criminal figures, such as in the film serial Fantômas. Early gangster films of the 1930s borrowed from pulp magazines and newspaper articles about real life gangsters. Pressure from groups advocating film censorship influenced the portrayal of gangsters, who were increasingly depicted as villains. Explicit depictions of violence became prominent again during the 1960s. Films showcasing more explicitly violent characters would continue into the 1990s ranging from films about serial killers to rogue police officers.

The crime genre encompasses various sub-genres, including the gangster film, heist film and prison film.

== Characteristics ==
Criminals in crime films may be portrayed as immoral yet charismatic, while police officers may break the law in pursuit of justice. These portrayals create moral ambiguity and challenge distinctions between criminals, victims, and law enforcement. The films reinforce social beliefs about morality and justice, such as the idea that crime does not pay. Their endings may challenge these beliefs by questioning characters' moral authority or blurring the distinction between innocence and guilt. These themes appear across various subgenres, including gangster films, detective films, and courtroom dramas. Crime films may use criminal activity to critique social and institutional structures, presenting conflicts between individuals and established systems of authority.The endings of crime films may reinforce or challenge conventional ideas of justice and morality, often questioning the moral authority of characters and the justice system.

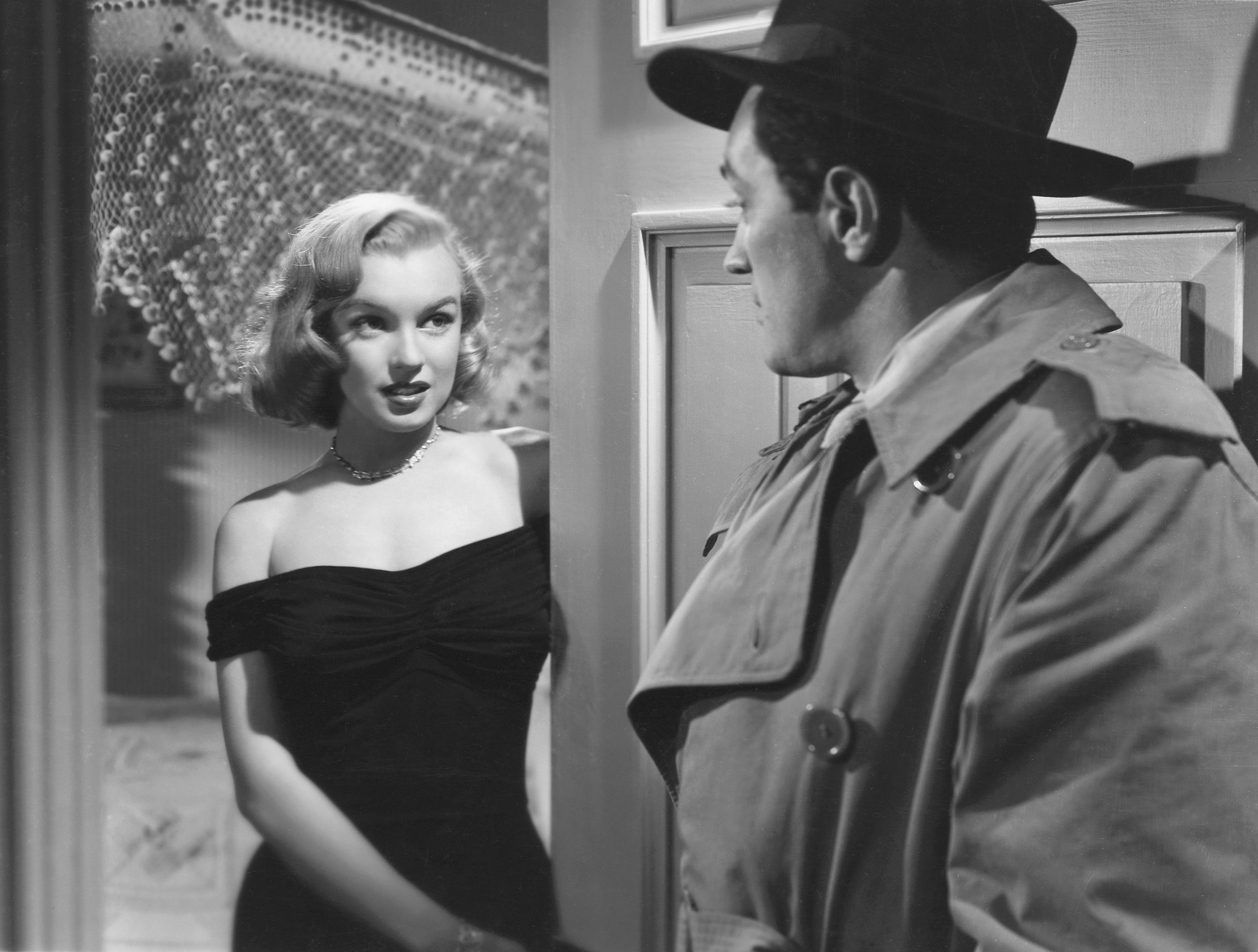
Marilyn Monroe in caper film The Asphalt Jungle (1950)

The crime film genre includes all films that focus on any of the three parties to a crime: criminals, victims, and avengers, and explores one party's relation to the other two. This allows the crime film to encompass films as wide apart as Wall Street (1987); caper film The Asphalt Jungle (1950); and prison films ranging from Brute Force (1947) to The Shawshank Redemption (1994).Crime films are not definable by their mise-en-scene such as the Western film as they lack both the instantly recognizable or the unique intent of other genres such as parody films.

The presence of crime and punishment in film does not necessarily make it a crime film.For example, Westerns such as The Great Train Robbery (1903), Unforgiven (1992), Winchester 73 (1950), and Rancho Notorious (1952) have narratives about crime and punishment, but are classified as Western films because of its setting and genre conventions. Crime-related themes are not exclusive to the crime film genre and frequently appear in other types of films.

== History ==
=== Silent era ===
The history of the crime film before 1940 reflects the changing social attitudes toward crime and criminals. In the first twenty years of the 20th Century, American society was under intense social reform with cities rapidly expanding, leading to social unrest, rising street crime rates and some people forming criminal gangs. In this early silent film period, criminals were more prominent on film screens than enforcers of the law. Among these early films from the period is The Musketeers of Pig Alley (1912) involving a young woman hounded by a mobster known as The Snapper Kid. Raoul Walsh's Regeneration (1915) was an early feature-length film about a gangster who was saved from a life of crime by a social worker. These two early films and others such as Tod Browning's Outside the Law (1920), that deal with the world of criminal activity, were described by Silver and Ursini as depicting gangsters "constrained by a strong moral code". Stuart Kaminsky in American Film Genres (1974) stated that prior to Little Caesar (1931), gangster characters were in films that were essentially romances.

European films of the silent era differed radically from the Hollywood productions, reflecting the post-World War I continental culture. Drew Todd wrote that with this, Europeans tended to create darker stories and the audiences of these films were more ready to accept these narratives. Several European silent films went much further in exploring the mystique of the criminal figures. These followed the success in France of Louis Feuillade's prewar film serial Fantômas (1913).

The average budget for a Hollywood feature went from $20,000 in 1914 to $300,000 in 1924. Silver and Ursini state that the earliest crime features were by Austrian émigré director Josef von Sternberg whose films such as Underworld (1927) eliminated depictions of most of the causes of criminal behavior and focused on the criminal perpetrators themselves, which would anticipate the popular gangster films of the 1930s.

=== 1930s ===
The gangster films of the early 1930s were influenced by the explosion in mass-market publishing after cheap wood-pulp paper stocks became available in the early 1920s. Newspapers made folk heroes of Prohibition-era bootleggers such as Al Capone, while pulp magazines such as Black Mask (1920) helped support more highbrow publications such as The Smart Set which published stories of hard-edged detectives such as Carroll John Daly's recurring protagonist Race Williams. The early wave of gangster films borrowed liberally from stories for early Hollywood productions that defined the genre with films such as Little Caesar (1931), The Public Enemy (1931), and Scarface (1932). In comparison to much earlier films of the silent era, Leitch described the 1930s films as turning "the bighearted crook silent films had considered ripe for redemption into a remorseless killer."

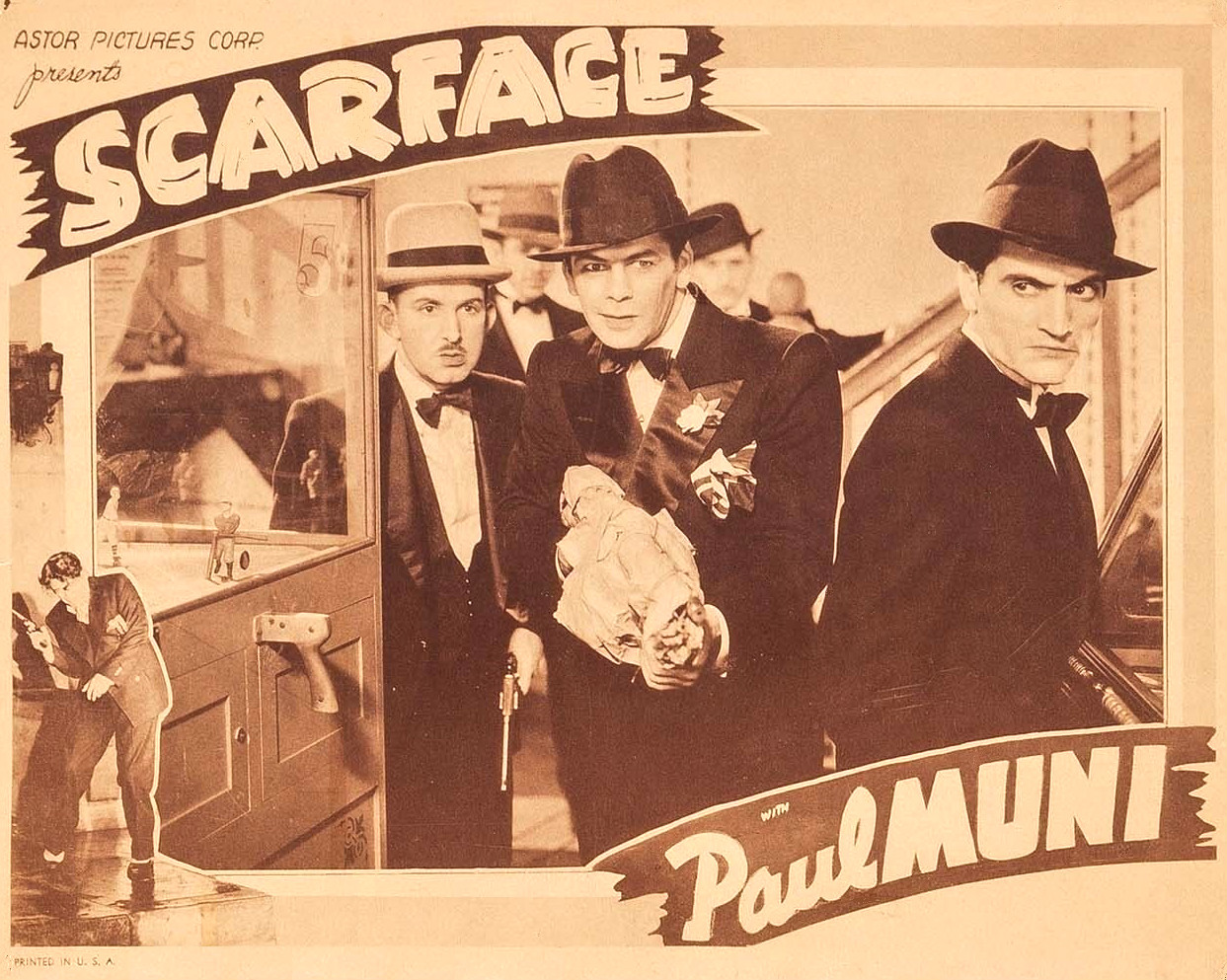
Promotional card for the early gangster film Scarface (1932)

Hollywood Studio heads were under such constant pressure from public-interest groups to tone down their portrayal of professional criminals that as early as 1931, Jack L. Warner announced that Warner Bros. would stop producing such films. Scarface itself was delayed for over a year as its director Howard Hughes talked with the Motion Picture Producers and Distributors of America's Production Code Office over the film's violence and overtones of incest.

A new wave of crime films were made from 1934 that depicted law enforcers as glamorous and as charismatic as the criminals. J. Edgar Hoover, director the Bureau of Investigation (renamed the Federal Bureau of Investigation (FBI) in 1935), promoted bigger budgets and wider press for his organization and himself through well-publicized campaigns against such real world gangsters as Machine Gun Kelly, Pretty Boy Floyd and John Dillinger. Hoover's exploits were fictionalized and glorified in films such as G Men (1935).

Through the 1930s, American films' views of criminals were predominantly glamorized, but as the decade ended, the attitudes Hollywood productions had towards fictional criminals grew less straightforward and more conflicted. In 1935, Humphrey Bogart played Duke Mantee in The Petrified Forest, a role Leitch described as the "first of Hollywood's overtly metaphorical gangsters." Bogart went on to appear in other gangster films in the later 1930s: Angels with Dirty Faces (1938) and The Roaring Twenties (1939). Unlike his co-star James Cagney, whose appeal is attributed by Leitch to him being "direct, physical, and extroverted", Bogart's characters and acting suggested "depths of worldly disillusionment beneath a crooked shell" as he portrayed gangsters who showcased the "romantic mystique of the doomed criminal."

=== 1940s ===
The 1940s saw an ambivalence toward the criminal heroes. Leitch suggested that this shift was from the decline in high-profile organized crime, partly because of the repeal of Prohibition in 1933 and partly because of the well-publicized success of the FBI. Unlike the crime films of the 1930s, the 1940s films were based more on fictional tales with gangsters played by Paul Muni in Angel on My Shoulder (1946) and Cagney in White Heat (1949) that were self-consciously anachronistic.

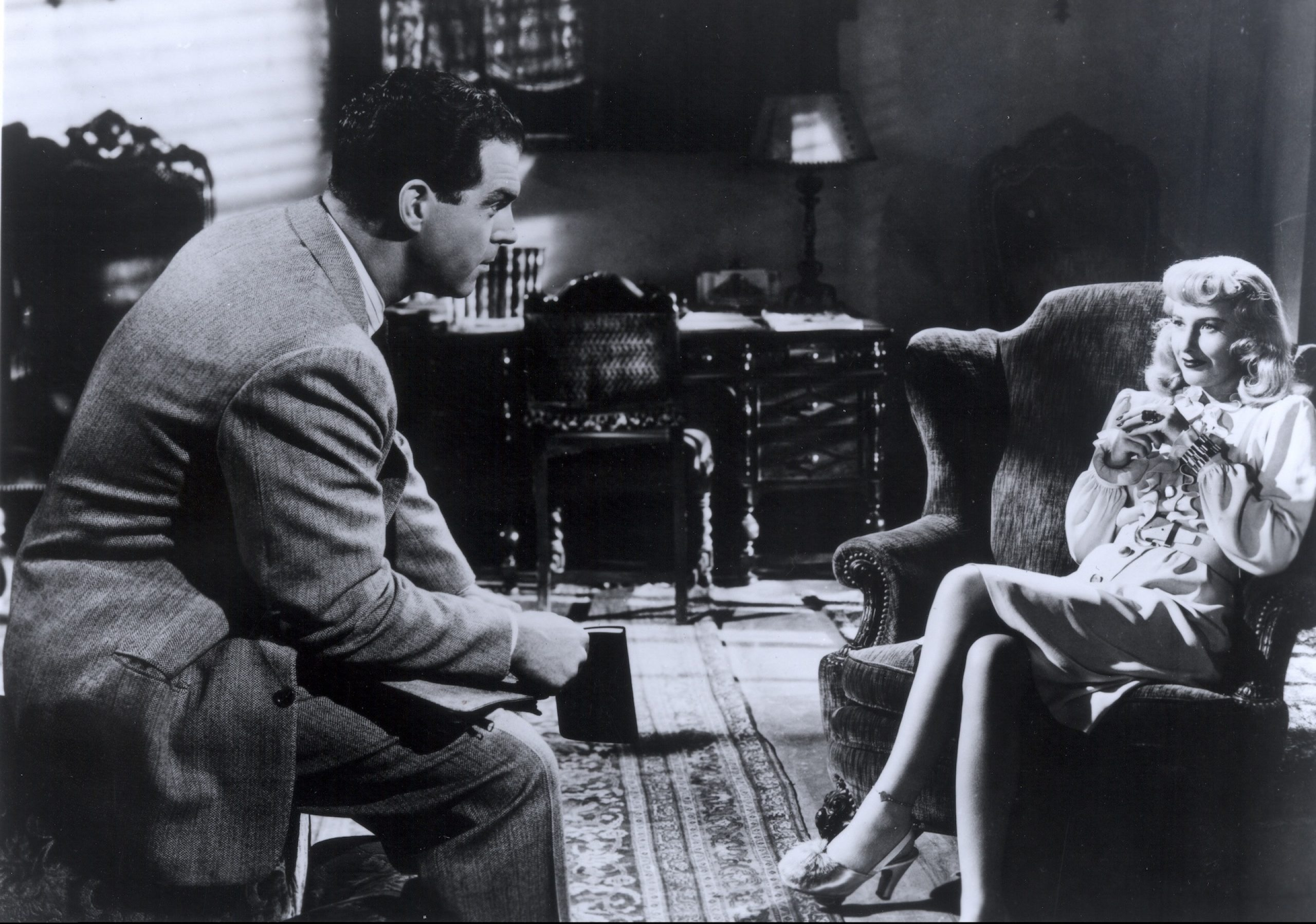
Fred MacMurray and Barbara Stanwyck in Double Indemnity (1944) by Billy Wilder was one of many crime films made in the 1940s by directors fleeing fascism in Europe.

Filmmakers from this period were fleeing Europe due to the rise of Nazism. These directors such as Fritz Lang, Robert Siodmak, and Billy Wilder would make crime films in the late 1930s and 1940s that were later described as film noir by French critics. Several films from 1944, including The Woman in the Window, Laura, Murder, My Sweet and Double Indemnity, ushered in this film cycle. These works continued into the mid-1950s. A reaction to film noir came with films with a more semi-documentary approach pioneered by the thriller The House on 92nd Street (1945). This led to crime films taking a more realistic approach, for example Kiss of Death (1947) and The Naked City (1948).

By the end of the decade, American critics such as Parker Tyler and Robert Warshow regarded Hollywood itself as a stage for repressed American cultural anxieties following World War II. This can be seen in films such as Brute Force, a prison film in which the prison is an existential social metaphor for what Leitch described as a "meaningless, tragically unjust round of activities."

=== 1950s ===
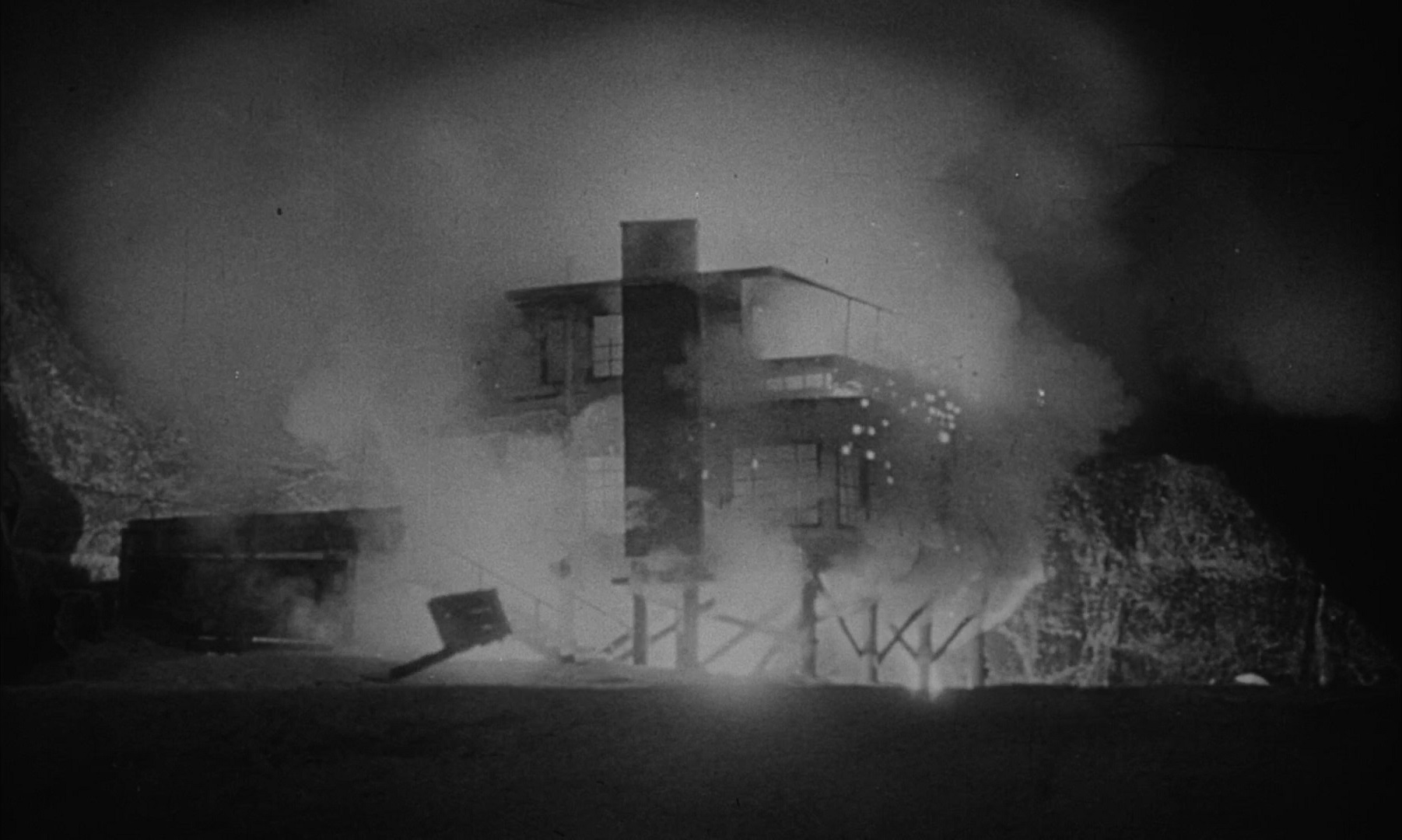
The final scene of Kiss Me Deadly (1955) included apocalyptic imagery common to the period directly after the invention of the nuclear bomb.

By 1950, the crime film was following changing attitudes towards the law and the social order that criminals metaphorically reflect while most films were also no more explicitly violent or explicitly sexual than those of 1934. White Heat (1949) inaugurated a cycle of crime films that would deal with the omnipresent danger of the nuclear bomb with its theme of the main gangster Jody Jarrett fighting fire with fire when being threatened with technological nightmares. These themes extended into two other major crime films by bringing the issues down from the global to the subcultural level: The Big Heat (1953) and Kiss Me Deadly (1955) which used apocalyptic imagery to indicate danger, with the former film persistently linking to images of catastrophically uncontrolled power and the "traumatic consequences" of nuclear holocaust and the latter literally featuring an atom bomb waiting in a locker of the Hollywood Athletic Club.

The Asphalt Jungle (1950) consolidated a tendency to define criminal subculture as a mirror of American culture. The cycle of caper films were foreshadowed by The Killers (1946) and Criss Cross (1949), leading to The Killing (1956) and Odds Against Tomorrow (1959). Leitch wrote that these films used the planning and action of a robbery to dramatize the "irreducible unreasonableness of life." The themes of existential despair made these films popular with European filmmakers, who would make their own heist films such as Rififi (1955) and Il bidone (1955). Filmmakers of the coming French New Wave movement later expanded on these crime films into complex mixtures of nostalgia and critique with Elevator to the Gallows (1958), Breathless (1960) and Shoot the Piano Player (1960).

=== 1960s ===
Following the classical noir period of 1940 to 1958, the 1960s saw a return to the violence of the two prewar decades. By 1960, film was losing popularity to television as the mass form of media entertainment. Crime films countered this by providing material not acceptable for television, first with a higher level of onscreen violence. Films such as Psycho (1960) and Black Sunday (1960) marked an increase in onscreen violence in film. Prior to these films, in Britain violence and gorier scenes were cut in Hammer film productions by the British Board of Film Censors or conveyed mostly through narration. Box-office receipts began to grow stronger towards the late 1960s. Hollywood's abandonment of the Hays Code standards would allow for further violent, risqué and gory films.

As college students at the University of California at Berkeley and Columbia University demonstrated against racial injustice and the Vietnam War, Hollywood generally ignored the war in narratives. The crime film Bonnie and Clyde (1967) revived the gangster film genre and captured the antiestablishment tone while also setting new standards for onscreen violence in film with its themes of demonizing American institutions to attack the moral injustice of the draft. This increase of violence was reflected in other crime films such as Point Blank (1967).

Leitch found the growing rage against the establishment spilled into portrayals of police themselves with films such as Bullitt (1968) about a police officer caught between mob killers and ruthless politicians while In the Heat of the Night (1967) which called for racial equality, became the first crime film to win an Academy Award for Best Picture.

=== 1970s ===
The French Connection (1971) dispensed with Bullitt's noble hero for the character of Jimmy "Popeye" Doyle who Leitch described as "tireless, brutal, vicious and indifferent" in terms of constraints of the law and his commanding officers. The film won several Academy Awards and was successful at the box office. This was followed by the critical and commercial success of The Godfather (1972) which also won a Best Picture Academy Award and performed even better than The French Connection at the box office. The success of the film and its sequel The Godfather Part II (1974) reinforced the stature of the gangster film genre, which continued into the 1990s with films Scarface (1983), Once Upon a Time in America (1984), The Untouchables (1987), Goodfellas (1990) and Donnie Brasco (1997).

Dirty Harry (1971) created a new form of police film, with Clint Eastwood's performance as Inspector Harry Callahan, whom critic Pauline Kael described as an "emotionless hero, who lives and kills as affectlessly as a psychopathic personality." Drew Todd in Shots in the Mirror: Crime Films and Society described Callahan as different to rebellious characters from the 1940s and 1950s, he being a character whose anger is directed against the state, mixed with fantasies of vigilante justice. Dirty Harry, The French Connection and Straw Dogs (1971) presented a violent vigilante as a savior. By the mid-1970s, a traditional lead with good looks, brawn and bravery was replaced with characters whom Todd described as "pathological outcast[s], embittered and impulsively violent."

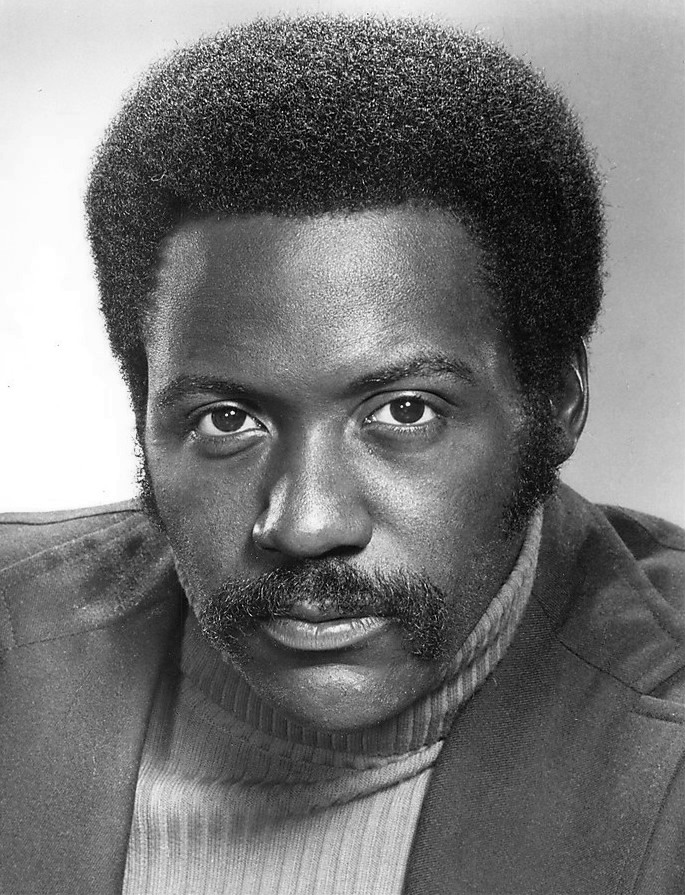
Richard Roundtree as John Shaft in 1973.

Hollywood productions began courting films produced and marketed by white Americans for the purpose of trying to attract a new audience with blaxploitation film. These films were almost exclusively crime films following the success of Shaft (1971) which led to studios rushing to follow its popularity with Super Fly (1972), Black Caesar (1973), Coffy (1973) and The Black Godfather (1974) The films were often derivations of earlier films; Cool Breeze (1972) was a remake of The Asphalt Jungle, Hit Man (1972) borrowed from the previous year's British film Get Carter, and Black Mama, White Mama (1973) was a remake of The Defiant Ones (1958). The cycle generally slowed down by the mid-1970s.

Prison films closely followed the formulas of films of the past while having an increased level of profanity, violence and sex. Cool Hand Luke (1967) inaugurated the revival and was followed into the 1970s with Papillon (1973), Midnight Express (1978) and Escape from Alcatraz (1979).

=== 1980s and 1990s ===
When Ronald Reagan became president in 1981, he ushered in a conservative era. For crime films, this led to various reactions, including political films that critiqued official policies and citizens' political apathy. These included Missing (1982), Silkwood (1983), and No Way Out (1987). Prison films and courtroom dramas would also be politically charged with films such as Kiss of the Spider Woman (1985) and Cry Freedom (1987).

While films about serial killers existed in earlier films such as M (1931) and Peeping Tom (1960), the 1980s had an emphasis on the serial nature of their crimes with a larger number of films focusing on the repetitive nature of some murders. While many of these films were teen-oriented pictures, they also included Dressed to Kill (1980) and Henry: Portrait of a Serial Killer (1986) and continued into the 2000s with Seven (1995), Kiss the Girls (1997), and American Psycho (2000).

In an article by John G. Cawelti titled "Chinatown and Generic Transformations in Recent American Films" (1979), Cawelti noticed a change signaled by films such as Chinatown (1974) and The Wild Bunch (1969) noting that older genres were being transformed through cultivation of nostalgia and a critique of the myths cultivated by their respective genres. Todd found that this found its way into crime films of the 1980s with films that could be labeled as post-modern, in which he felt that "genres blur, pastiche prevails, and once-fixed ideals, such as time and meaning, are subverted and destabilized". This would apply to the American crime film which began rejecting linear storytelling and distinctions between right and wrong with works from directors such as Brian de Palma (Dressed to Kill and Scarface) and works from The Coen Brothers and David Lynch whom Todd described as having "stylized yet gritty and dryly humorous pictures evoking dream states" with films including Blood Simple (1984), Blue Velvet (1986) and Wild at Heart (1990). Quentin Tarantino would continue this trend in the 1990s with films in which violence and crime is treated lightly, such as Reservoir Dogs (1992), Pulp Fiction (1994) and Natural Born Killers (1994); while Lynch and the Coens would continue with Fargo (1996) and Lost Highway (1997). Other directors such as Martin Scorsese and Sidney Lumet continued to make more traditional crime films, including Goodfellas, Prince of the City (1980), Q & A (1990), and Casino (1995).

Other trends of the 1990s extended the boundaries of crime films, ranging from main characters who were female or minorities with Thelma and Louise (1991), Swoon (1991), Devil in a Blue Dress (1995), Bound (1996) and Dolores Claiborne (1996).

== Sub-genres ==
Many genres are sub-genres of a wider genre from whose contexts their own conventions take their meaning; it makes sense to think of the gangster film as both a genre on its own terms and a sub-genre of the crime film.

=== Gangster film ===
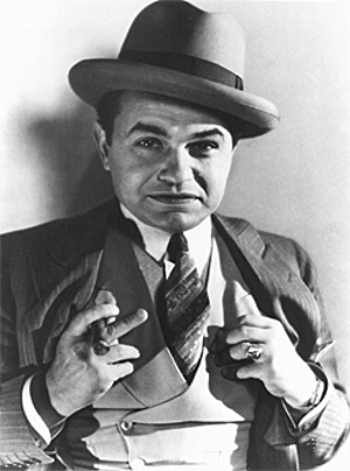
Publicity image of Edward G. Robinson, an early star of gangster films such as Little Caesar (1931) and Key Largo (1948).

In these films, the gangsters and their values have been embedded through decades of reiteration and revision, generally with a masculine style where an elaboration on codes of behavior by acts of decisive violence are central concerns.

The archetypal gangster film was the Hollywood production Little Caesar (1931). A moral panic followed the release of the early gangster films following Little Caesar, which led to the 1935 Production Code Administration in 1935 ending its first major cycle. As early as 1939, the traditional gangster was already a nostalgic figure, as seen in that year's The Roaring Twenties. American productions about career criminals became possible through the relaxation of the code in the 1950s and its abolition in 1966. While not the only or first gangster film following the fall of the production code, The Godfather (1972) was the most popular and launched a major revival of the style. The film followed the themes of the genres past while adding new emphasis on the intricate world of the mafia and its scale and seriousness that established new parameters for the genre.

=== Heist film ===
The heist film, also known as the "caper" film, is a style of crime film that originated from two cinematic precursors: the gangster film and the gentleman thief film. The essential element in these films is the plot concentration on the commission of a single crime of great monetary significance, at least on the surface level. The narratives in these films focus on the heist being wrapped up in the execution of the crime more or at least as much as the criminal psychology and are characterized by an emphasis on the crime unfolding, often through montage and extended sequences.

The term "caper film" was used for the more dramatic films of the 1950s, while in the 1960s, it had stronger elements of romantic comedy with more playful elements, as seen in The Thomas Crown Affair (1968) and Topkapi (1964).

=== Romantic crime film ===
Romantic crime films, also known as the "lovers-on-the-run" films, are films that combine the crime drama, thriller, and romance genres in story narratives that deal with romantic couples that engage or are caught in criminal activities. Film noirs such as You Only Live Once (1937), They Live by Night (1948), and Gun Crazy (1950) experimented with the trope, but the concept of "outlaw lovers" was popularized with the release of Bonnie and Clyde in 1967, which in turn inspired later romantic crime films such as Badlands (1973) and True Romance (1993).

=== Hybrid genres ===
Leitch described combining genres as problematic. Screenwriter and academic Jule Selbo expanded on this, describing a film classified as "crime/action" or as "action/crime" or other hybrids was "only a semantic exercise" as both genres are important in the construction phase of the narrative. Mark Bould in A Companion to Film Noir stated that categorization of multiple generic genre labels was common in film reviews and rarely concerned with succinct descriptions that evoke elements of the film's form and content, and make no claims beyond how these elements combine.

== Reception ==
Leitch stated that the genre has been popular since the dawn of the sound era of film. Ursini and Silver said that unlike the Western, the horror film, or the war film, the popularity of crime cinema has never waned.

== See also ==
- Crime jazz
- Dacoit films
- Mumbai underworld films
- Pre-Code crime films
- Yakuza film
