= Detroit 9000 =

1973 film by Arthur Marks

- Film poster by John Solie
- Directed by: Arthur Marks
- Screenplay by: Orville H. Hampton
- Produced by: Arthur Marks
- Starring: Alex Rocco; Hari Rhodes; Vonetta McGee; Herbert Jefferson Jr.; Ella Edwards
- Cinematography: Harry May
- Edited by: Richard Greer
- Music by: Luchi De Jesus
- Production company: Holly Hill Productions
- Distributed by: General Film Corporation
- Release dates: August 7, 1973 (Detroit); October 9, 1998 (re-release)
- Running time: 106 minutes
- Country: United States
- Language: English
- Box office: $3,179 (1998 re-release) $1.2 million (US/Canada rentals)

Detroit 9000 is a 1973 American action film directed by Arthur Marks from a screenplay by Orville H. Hampton. Originally marketed as a blaxploitation film, it had a resurgence on video 25 years later.

== Plot ==
Street-smart white detective Danny Bassett (Alex Rocco) teams with educated black detective Sgt. Jesse Williams (Hari Rhodes) to investigate a theft of $400,000 at a fund-raiser for Representative Aubrey Hale Clayton (Rudy Challenger).

== Cast ==
- Hari Rhodes as Sergeant Jesse Williams
- Alex Rocco as Lieutenant Danny Bassett
- Vonetta McGee as Ruby Harris
- Ella Edwards as Helen Durbin
- Scatman Crothers as Reverend Markham
- Herbert Jefferson Jr. as Ferdy
- Robert Phillips as Captain Chalmers
- Rudy Challenger as Aubrey Hale Clayton
- Council Cargle as Drew Sheppard

== Filming ==
Actor Alex Rocco was cast as a result of director Arthur Marks' positive experience working with him on their 1972 film Bonnie's Kids.

Unlike many films set in Detroit (such as RoboCop and Bird on a Wire), Detroit 9000 was mostly shot on location in downtown Detroit and close-in neighborhoods. A number of now demolished landmark buildings can be seen including the J.L. Hudson Company, and Fort Street Union Depot. Fort Street Station was already closed when filming was taking place and the approach tracks to the station were used for a chase scene. The now restored Book Cadillac Hotel was used in the reception scenes, including the hotel's famed crystal ballroom. Although the hotel closed in 1983 and sat dormant for over 20 years, it was restored and reopened by the Westin Hotel group in 2009. Although Detroit suffered from race rioting in July 1967, and the riots are referred to in the movie, the film avoided showing areas that still showed signs of heavy damage from the rioting.

The final shootout takes place in historic Elmwood Cemetery. Sacred Heart Seminary stands in for the "Longview Sanitarium", where Bassett goes to visit his institutionalized wife. The hospital is Detroit Memorial Hospital on St. Antoine St. (The building was torn down in 1987.) Detroit Police headquarters at 1300 Beaubien Street (Re-located to the new Detroit Public Safety Headquarters building with the Detroit Fire Department on 1301 Third Street in 2013) is also shown.

A number of local Detroit celebrities appeared in the film, such as disc jockey Dick Purtan, who plays the police detective who converses with Alex Rocco's character just prior to his boarding a police helicopter. Then-Detroit Police Chief John Nichols played himself in the TV station scene, and Detroit radio personality Martha Jean "The Queen" Steinberg played the host. The Soul Train dancer Pat Davis also made a cameo in the film.

The title is a reference to the Detroit Police radio code "9000", which means "officer down".

== Re-release ==
Championed by Quentin Tarantino, the film was given a limited re-release theatrically by his short-lived Rolling Thunder Pictures distribution company in October 1998. It was subsequently released on video by Miramax in April 1999. Tarantino also included a line of dialogue from the film into the soundtrack for his own film Jackie Brown.

== Reception ==
During the film's original theatrical run, Roger Ebert of the Chicago Sun-Times gave it two stars out of four and called it "a tough, cynical, big-city cop movie that occasionally tries to rise above its genre but doesn't quite make it. Maybe it would have worked better if it hadn't tried so hard." Gene Siskel of the Chicago Tribune awarded an identical two-star grade and wrote that Alex Rocco "turns in another excellent performance", but the film needed "a strong rewrite of its script, a revision that would remove the tedious black-and-white insults that pepper its principal characters' speech." Variety stated, "Filming is generally good and the acting by the leads is better than adequate ... But editing and cutting is jerky and the one flashback, an important part of the denouement, is so abrupt that it takes several moments to realize that a dying girl didn't suddenly get up and start walking around in the street. And there such stilted bits of dialogue as, 'Those boys were real top pros,' laced through the picture." The Independent Film Journal wrote, "Give Detroit 9000 one point for originality. It's the first black and/or cops and robbers film in a while that hasn't revolved completely about drugs. They, in fact, are hardly mentioned here, but it doesn't matter much. The rest of the film is much the same. A lot of corruption, a lot of running around and a lot of blood, particularly in the final reels ... Arthur Marks' direction is professional but uninteresting, only reinforcing the impression that you've seen all this before."

The re-release met with generally favorable reviews. The New York Times critic Lawrence Van Gelder claimed "In general release, Detroit 9000 illustrates the wisdom of the adage "better late than never", and praised the film's complex racial politics, while The A.V. Club's Nathan Rabin opined that, while the film was flawed, it was also an "interesting, thoroughly watchable film, and considering its genre and origins, that's something of an achievement." Reviewing the film's 2013 re-issue by Lionsgate Films as part of a Rolling Thunder Picture triple-pack (with The Mighty Peking Man and Switchblade Sisters), DVD Talk's Ian Jane called it a "top notch cops and robbers urban crime thriller" which is "Not content to just titillate the audience with the more exploitative elements inherent in the genre... [the] film addresses head on the issues of racial tension, marital infidelity, and the difficulties of trying to make ends meet while still playing the part of an honest cop."

The film holds a score of 25% on Rotten Tomatoes based on 8 reviews.

== See also ==
- List of American films of 1973
