= Jack Carter's Law =

1974 novel by Ted Lewis

- First edition
- Author: Ted Lewis
- Language: English
- Series: Jack Carter
- Genre: Crime fiction
- Publisher: Michael Joseph
- Publication date: 1974
- Publication place: United Kingdom
- Media type: Print
- Pages: 212
- ISBN: 0-7181-1322-5
- Preceded by: Jack's Return Home
- Followed by: Jack Carter and the Mafia Pigeon

Jack Carter's Law is a 1974 British crime novel written by Ted Lewis. It is a prequel to Lewis's best known work, Jack's Return Home (1970) which was adapted into the film Get Carter in 1971. On Christmas Eve, Jack Carter learns that a supergrass is about to inform to the police and put him and his associates away for lengthy prison sentences. Carter attempts to hunt down the informer, but it proves a far more dangerous task than he anticipates.
