= Rudy Challenger =

American actor

- Born: Rudolph Michael Challenger; October 2, 1928; New York City, New York, U.S.
- Died: August 22, 2012 (aged 83); Van Nuys, California, U.S.
- Occupation: Actor
- Years active: 1969–1989
- Spouse(s): Lisa Davis-Waltz (1973–1978, divorced); Charlotte Challenger (his death)

Rudolph Michael Challenger (October 2, 1928 – August 22, 2012) was an African-American supporting actor who had roles in various projects over the course of his thirty-four year career in film and television in Hollywood. He appeared on such shows as Sanford and Son, Kojak, Lou Grant, and The Fall Guy. He also appeared in the 1970s blaxploitation flicks Detroit 9000 (1973) and the highly successful box office hit film Sheba Baby (1975), opposite actress Pam Grier.

== Career ==
The New York City-born and raised Challenger first got his acting start on the stage in the early 1960s, performing in the off-Broadway plays The Rise and Fall Of The City Of Mahagonny, Along Came A Spider, and the Jacques Levy-directed Scuba Duba, where he appeared alongside the likes of future television and film stars such as Judd Hirsch, Conrad Bain, and Jerry Orbach. The play ran for 692 performances, from October 10, 1967, to June 8, 1969. He also appeared in the Broadway productions Tambourines In Grey (1963), Do I Hear A Waltz? (1965), Tiger, Tiger Burning Bright (1962), and four-time Tony Award winning, Robert Lewis directed On a Clear Day You Can See Forever (1965) which ran for 280 performances, from October 17, 1965, to June 11, 1966. Challenger was married to veteran British actress Lisa Davis Waltz from December 31, 1973, to September 14, 1978, after almost two and a half years of separation.

Challenger retired from acting on both stage and screen in 1989. He latterly resided in Southern California with his wife, Charlotte. Challenger died in Van Nuys, California on August 22, 2012, at the age of 83.

== Filmography ==
Year	Title	Role	Notes
1969	Change of Mind	Howard Culver	
1969	Some Kind of a Nut	Bank Executive	Uncredited
1972	Cool Breeze	Roy Harris	
1972	Hit Man	Swift	
1973	Detroit 9000	Aubrey Hale Clayton	
1973	The Slams	Minor Role	
1975	Sheba, Baby	Andy Shayne	
1984	Sole Survivor	Air Traffic Controller	
1989	Harlem Nights	Patron #1	(final film role)
