= Hit Man (1972 film) =

1972 film by George Armitage

- Theatrical release poster by John Solie
- Directed by: George Armitage
- Screenplay by: George Armitage
- Based on: Jack's Return Home by Ted Lewis
- Produced by: Gene Corman
- Starring: Bernie Casey; Pamela Grier
- Cinematography: Andrew Davis
- Edited by: Morton Tubor
- Music by: H.B. Barnum
- Production company: Penelope Productions
- Distributed by: Metro-Goldwyn-Mayer
- Release date: December 20, 1972 (New York City)
- Running time: 90 minutes
- Country: United States
- Language: English
- Box office: $1.19 million (US rentals)

Hit Man is a 1972 American crime thriller film written and directed by George Armitage, produced by Gene Corman, and starring Bernie Casey and Pam Grier. It is a blaxploitation-themed adaptation of Ted Lewis' 1970 novel Jack's Return Home, more famously adapted as Get Carter (1971), with the action relocated from England to the United States.

== Plot ==
Tyrone Tackett, a former police officer, returns to Los Angeles to investigate the suspicious death of his brother, Cornell. Cornell's girlfriend, prostitute Irvelle Way, denies knowledge about Cornell's death, but Tyrone insists she attend the funeral for further questioning. At Cornell's house, Tyrone notices he is being followed by two men, Baby Huey and Leon. He finds Cornell's shotgun but not his teenage daughter, Rochelle. At the funeral, he learns Cornell died from drowning after driving off the road while drunk. Rochelle refuses Tyrone's offer to live with him. Irvelle’s presence at the funeral sparks animosity in Rochelle, prompting Tyrone to threaten Irvelle for the truth.

Tyrone, joined by Cornell’s business partner Sherwood Epps, revisits Cornell's home. They drink heavily, and Sherwood offers Tyrone a car if he helps repossess it. At the car lot, Tyrone calls his girlfriend, Nita Biggs, and speaks to her erotically, unsettling Sherwood's customers. Tyrone later rents a motel room from manager Laural Garfoot. The following day, he examines the scene where Cornell’s car went off-road and confronts Huey by shooting Huey's car windshield.

Tyrone attends a dogfight to find local mobsters and encounters Shag Merriweather, a driver for mobster Nano Zito. Tyrone commandeers Shag's car and gains access to Zito's mansion. Zito challenges Tyrone to a handball game; Tyrone wins, leading to a confrontation with Shag. Tyrone seeks to connect with Rochelle, but she rejects him. At the motel, Tyrone has a sexual encounter with Laural; Sherwood interrupts, warning that Huey, Leon, and another thug are looking for Tyrone. Tyrone captures Huey, who reveals Theotis Oliver, a pornographic theater owner, as the person behind the harassment.

Tyrone visits Oliver, finding him disciplining his teenage daughter. Oliver denies knowledge of Tyrone. Back at the motel, Tyrone finds it ransacked. He and Laural are again interrupted by Leon and a thug, who warn Tyrone to leave town. Tyrone retaliates, forcing them to flee. Sherwood, found beaten but with a young girl, leads Tyrone to Africa America, a wildlife park, to find an old friend, Julius Swift. Unable to locate Swift, Tyrone meets Irvelle, who suggests Cornell's death was a suicide following their breakup.

Gozelda, an aspiring porn actress, rescues Tyrone from another attack and takes him to Oliver's new theater. Oliver offers Tyrone money to kill Zito, claiming Zito killed Cornell. Tyrone refuses. Gozelda takes Tyrone to a porn film featuring Rochelle, leading Tyrone to realize Cornell was killed seeking retribution. Tyrone finds Rochelle dead at her home and learns from Swift that Shag forced Cornell to drink, then drove him into the sea. Tyrone kills Swift and hangs Oliver in his theater after Oliver admits to manipulating Cornell, then tells Oliver's crew that Zito hanged Oliver.

Tyrone arranges with Zito to leave town in exchange for Shag. Zito’s corrupt policeman attempts to set Tyrone up, but Oliver's thugs kill Zito. Tyrone confronts and kills Shag, then scatters Cornell’s ashes in the sea. The policeman, hearing Zito died, spares Tyrone, who returns to his old life.

== Cast ==
- Bernie Casey as Tyrone Tackett
- Pam Grier as Gozelda
- Lisa Moore as Laural Garfoot
- Bhetty Waldron as Irvelle Way
- Sam Laws as Sherwood Epps
- Candy All as Rochelle Tackett
- Don Diamond as Nano Zito
- Edmund Cambridge as Theotis Oliver
- Bob Harris as "Shag" Merriweather
- Rudy Challenger as Julius Swift
- Tracy Ann-King as Nita Biggs
- Christopher Joy as Leon
- Roger E. Mosley as Huey "Baby Huey"
- John Lupton as Commercial Director
- Paul Gleason as Cop (uncredited)

== Production ==
George Armitage says he never saw Get Carter before making the film, claiming that producer Gene Corman gave him a copy of the script with no title and said that MGM owned it. Armitage rewrote it to be set in the African American community, and only then did his agent tell him it was Get Carter. Armitage:

I didn't feel at the time that a white director should be directing it. So I met with Bernie Casey, the film's star, who wanted to direct it, and campaigned for him with Gene, and he said: "I don't want to take a chance on someone who hasn't directed." So he wasn't going to make the picture, and at that point there was a lot of crew and cast involved, and they were friends, so I said: "Okay, I'll do it." There was a great deal of improvisation by the actors, who were bringing me dialogue from the African-American community, and it really worked. Growing up in a racially mixed neighborhood, like I did in Baldwin Hills, I knew a little bit about the culture, but the actors brought so much in terms of dialogue and honesty ... The Colonial Motel up on Sunset worked beautifully for us, and we also shot at a funeral home in southwest L.A., we shot all over there, with a crazy police escort holding traffic on every location. And between locations I'd get in a squad car with these crazy cops and drive 150 mph to the next location, I thought: "God, Roger would be so thrilled with that, that's the way to travel." And I'm so glad we were able to shoot in the Watts Towers, right down there at 103rd.

The film follows details from Lewis' novel more closely than Get Carter, and does not end with the protagonist's death.

Hit Man marked the second time Corman had produced a blaxploitation film for Metro-Goldwyn-Mayer (MGM) that was based on a novel which had previously been adapted for one of the company's films, following Cool Breeze, an adaptation of W. R. Burnett's novel The Asphalt Jungle, which had previously inspired the film of the same name. Both of Corman's productions shared several cast and crew members, including Pam Grier, Rudy Challenger and Sam Laws.

Future director Andrew Davis (Under Siege, The Fugitive) was the film's cinematographer, one of several low-budget films he shot for Gene and Roger Corman during the 1970s. Davis said of his experience:

When I went to work for Gene Corman for Cool Breeze, Hit Man, Private Parts, and The Slams, they had small $300,000 budgets or less. It allowed me to see what it took to make a movie. I worked with first time directors, learned with them, and could recommend things, so I was able to get my hands in the works. Everybody was a character.

== Reception ==
=== Box office ===
Hit Man earned an estimated $1.19 million in North American rentals in 1973.

=== Critical response ===
According to the January 1973 edition of Variety, the film was condemned by the National Legion of Decency, which stated that its "dizzying spectacle of raw sex and supergraphic violence would horrify the Marquis de Sade". Gene Siskel, for his part, described the film, in his Chicago Tribune review, as a ripoff of the 1971 film Get Carter, adding that while that film "had a gritty, nasty look that fits in nicely with the low-life mob members who populated it"[,] Hit Man looks like every other black-men-against-the-Italian-mob picture. The decor is subordinate to the racial slurs."

== See also ==
- List of American films of 1972
