= Herbert Jefferson Jr. =

American actor (born 1946)

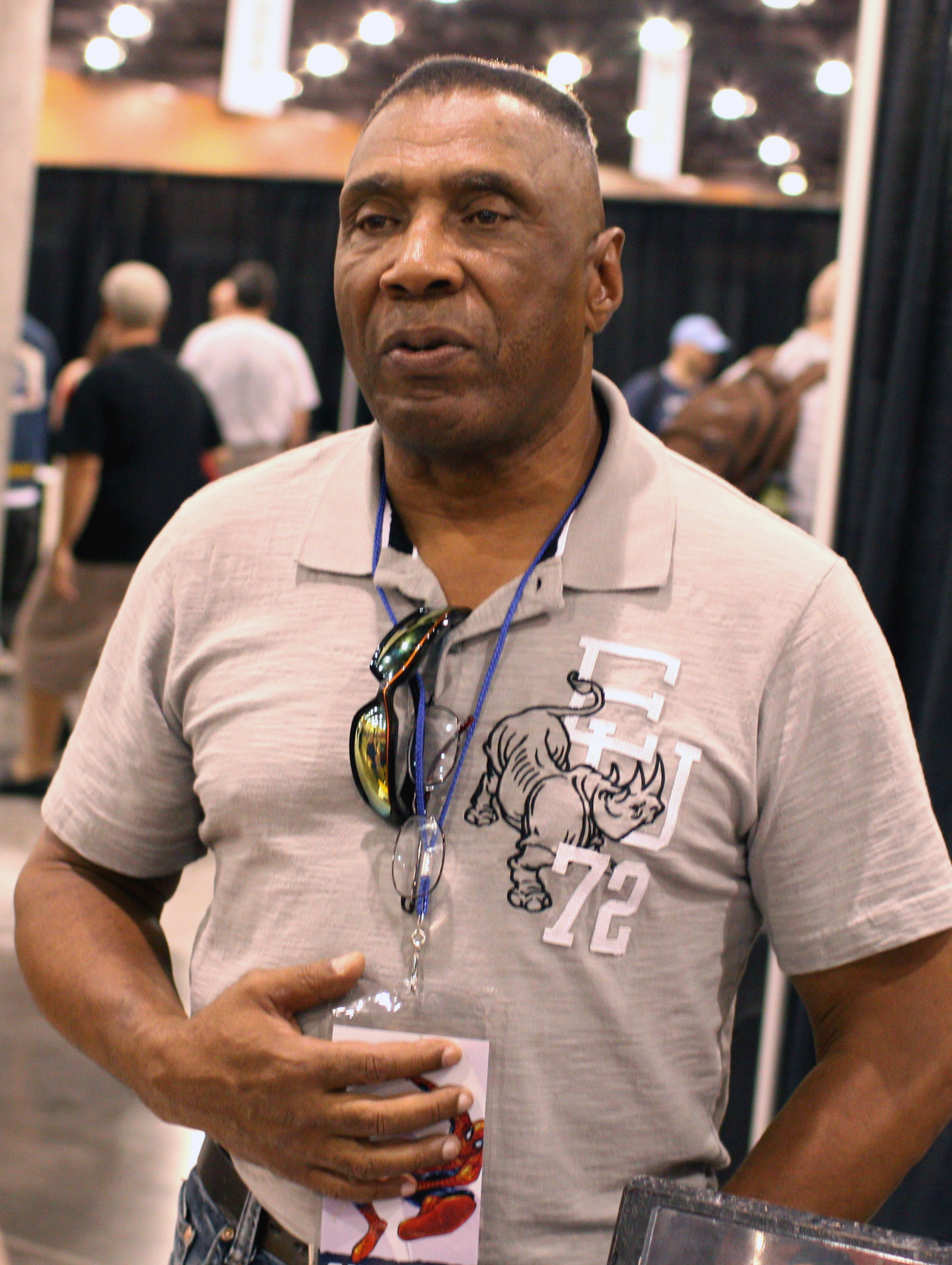
- Herbert Jefferson Jr., at the 2012 Phoenix Comicon
- Born: September 28, 1946 (age 79); Sandersville, Georgia, U.S.
- Occupation: Actor
- Years active: 1969-present

Herbert Jefferson Jr., (born September 28, 1946, Sandersville, Georgia) is an American film, television, and stage actor.

== Early life ==
Raised in Jersey City, New Jersey, he went to Lincoln High School, briefly attended Jersey City State College and Rutgers University, and graduated with honors from New York's American Academy of Dramatic Arts in 1969. He also trained at the HB Studio in New York, with William Hickey and Michael Becket, and at The Actors Studio with Lee Strasberg.

== Career ==
=== Television ===
Jefferson co-starred as merchant seaman Roy Dwyer in the award-winning novel for television Rich Man, Poor Man, its sequel, Rich Man, Poor Man Book II, and other TV films, such as the Emmy Award-winning miniseries drama The Law, with Judd Hirsch, as Jamaican defendant Maxwell Fall, and the Revolutionary War novel for TV, The Bastard, as Lucas, one of the legendary Minutemen, which is based on the best-selling book by historical novelist John Jakes.

Jefferson also appeared as a guest star in the pilot episodes of both the 1982 TV series Knight Rider as Muntzy, an undercover police officer and partner of Michael Long (who becomes Michael Knight), and the 1984 pilot of the TV series Airwolf, as the commander of the aircraft carrier USS Enterprise.

==== Battlestar Galactica ====
He is probably best known for his role as Lieutenant Boomer on the original Battlestar Galactica television series, a role made possible when the intended actor, Terry Carter, was injured by roller skating, but was still cast as Colonel Tigh in the series. Later, in the 1980 spin-off Galactica 1980, his character was promoted to colonel, and had moved up in the chain of command to become the executive officer of the Galactica, replacing Carter in the process.

=== Films ===
His notable feature-film credits include the award-winning Ron Howard film Apollo 13 (1995), where he played a news reporter, and the Wolfgang Petersen film Outbreak (1995) as a doctor. He also appeared in two films starring football legend Jim Brown, Black Gunn (1972), as his brother, The Slams (1973), as his cellmate, and Roger Corman's Private Duty Nurses (1971), as activist Dr. Elton Sanders, which marked his feature-film debut.

=== Web series ===
In 2015, he appeared in the cameo role of Admiral Grant (Ben) Satterlee in the pilot of the web-based series Star Trek: Renegades (the pilot episode was developed for television, but was rejected, and subsequently made available on the Internet). In 2007, he portrayed Captain Galt, a freedom fighter, in the Internet miniseries Star Trek: Of Gods and Men, from the same independent production company.
