= Get Carter (2000 film) =

2000 film by Stephen Kay

- Theatrical release poster
- Directed by: Stephen Kay
- Screenplay by: David McKenna
- Based on: Jack's Return Home by Ted Lewis
- Produced by: Mark Canton; Neil Canton; Elie Samaha
- Starring: Sylvester Stallone; Miranda Richardson; Rachael Leigh Cook; Alan Cumming; Mickey Rourke; Michael Caine
- Cinematography: Mauro Fiore
- Edited by: Jerry Greenberg
- Music by: Tyler Bates
- Production companies: Franchise Pictures; The Canton Company; Carter Productions
- Distributed by: Morgan Creek Productions, Inc. (through Warner Bros. Pictures)
- Release date: October 6, 2000 (United States)
- Running time: 102 minutes
- Country: United States
- Language: English
- Budget: $63.6 million
- Box office: $19.4 million

Get Carter is a 2000 American neo-noir action thriller film directed by Stephen Kay, written by David McKenna, and starring Sylvester Stallone, Miranda Richardson, Rachael Leigh Cook, Alan Cumming, Mickey Rourke, John C. McGinley, Rhona Mitra, and Michael Caine. Based on the Ted Lewis' novel Jack's Return Home, the film is a remake of the 1971 film of the same name, in which Caine played the title role.

The film was released in the United States by Morgan Creek Productions, Inc. (through Warner Bros. Pictures) on October 6, 2000. It was panned by critics and the film flopped at the box office, with worldwide earnings of approximately $19.4 million against a production budget of $63.6 million.

== Plot ==
Jack Carter, a mob enforcer living in Las Vegas, returns home to Seattle after hearing that his brother, Ritchie, was killed in a drunk driving crash. His partner, Con McCarty, covers for him with his mob boss, Fletcher – whose girlfriend Audrey is having an affair with Jack.

At his brother's funeral, Jack meets his niece, Doreen, and Eddie, a friend and co-worker of Ritchie. Both tell Jack that Ritchie rarely drank and would never have driven while intoxicated; Eddie also says Ritchie would not be involved in any illicit activities. He also talks to a woman, Geraldine, who is evasive and cryptic about her relationship to Ritchie. At the wake, Jack continues questioning mourners and well-wishers about what happened to his brother, drawing the ire of Ritchie's widow, Gloria.

He confronts the owner of the club Ritchie managed, loan shark Cliff Brumby. Brumby doesn't believe Ritchie was murdered, but tells Jack that Ritchie was having an affair with Geraldine, an associate of local boss Cyrus Paice.

Jack questions Paice but doesn't get any useful information. He follows Paice and is led to Jeremy Kinnear, a wealthy computer mogul who hired Paice to discreetly procure beautiful women for him at parties so he can present a "professional" and squeaky-clean image. However, Paice is now blackmailing Kinnear into running Paice's pornographic websites. Unable to get any straight answers, Jack carefully examines surveillance tapes from Brumby's club.

He discovers that Paice produces amateur porn movies using young women drugged and raped by Eddie and Geraldine; one video shows Doreen as one of the victims. Geraldine found out Doreen was Ritchie's daughter and gave the video disc to Ritchie, but Ritchie was murdered and set up to look like an accident before he could take it to the police.

Audrey breaks up with Jack, who tells Fletcher that he is done with Vegas; McCarty and another gangster are sent to confront Jack, who manages to evade them. Jack talks with Doreen about what happened in the video, comforting her and telling her that what happened was not her fault.

Jack sets out on a path of vengeance. Geraldine calls Jack, apologizes for what happened to Doreen, and says that Paice is coming to kill her; Jack arrives to find her body. He then heads to Eddie's apartment to interrogate him. Eddie tells Jack that Paice is at Kinnear's; Jack throws him off the balcony to his death. McCarty tracks Jack to Eddie's apartment, beginning a car chase; McCarty is forced off the road, crashing violently and presumably killing the mobsters. At Kinnear's house, Jack confronts Paice, who claims Kinnear is the man behind Ritchie's murder. Jack attempts to hit Paice from behind, but Paice sees him in a reflection and ducks. Paice then pummels him to the ground while commenting that Ritchie put up more of a fight than he did, thereby admitting that he was involved in his brother's death. Paice walks away and joins some women on the busy dance floor.

Bloodied, Jack gets up and follows Paice to the dance floor, telling him he should finish what he starts. Paice agrees; he tries to sucker punch Jack, but Jack floors him with one punch before brutally beating Paice to death. Jack pulls his pistol and points it directly at Paice's face.

Jack confronts Kinnear, who says that he only told Paice to get the disc back from Ritchie, not kill him, and that Paice and Brumby committed the murder; Jack lets Kinnear live.

In a car park, Jack finds Brumby attempting to steal the disc from Jack's car. Brumby admits involvement in the murder, warning Jack that killing him will force him to run for the rest of his life. As Brumby walks away, Jack calls out to him. Brumby won't turn around, and Jack shoots him in the back.

Having settled the score for his brother, a now shaven Jack meets Doreen one last time at Ritchie's grave and explains that he has to go away for a while. After reminding her that she is special, they say their goodbyes. Jack gets into his car and opens a map that leads to Las Vegas.

== Cast ==
- Sylvester Stallone as Jack Carter
- Miranda Richardson as Gloria Carter
- Rachael Leigh Cook as Doreen Carter
- Alan Cumming as Jeremy Kinnear
- Mickey Rourke as Cyrus Paice
- John C. McGinley as Con McCarty
- Michael Caine as Cliff Brumby
- Rhona Mitra as Geraldine
- Johnny Strong as Eddie
- John Cassini as Thorpey
- Mark Boone Junior as Jim Davis
- Crystal Lowe as Maya
- Lauren Lee Smith as Cassie
- Tyler Labine as Bud

Uncredited

- Gretchen Mol as Audrey
- Tom Sizemore as Les Fletcher (voice)

== Production ==
=== Development ===
A remake of Get Carter was first announced in 1997. The film had previously been remade in 1972 by director George Armitage as Hit Man. Tarsem Singh was first attached to direct, then replaced by Samuel Bayer, before Stephen Kay signed on. The remake shifted the action from Newcastle upon Tyne to Seattle.

=== Filming ===
Principal photography took place mainly in Vancouver, British Columbia, although the production spent several days in Seattle and Tacoma, Washington to film exteriors of local landmarks. The opening Las Vegas sequence was shot at The Venetian casino-hotel.

=== Casting ===
Michael Caine's role was originally relegated to a one-scene cameo appearance, which he agreed to do as a favor to his friend Sylvester Stallone. However, after a test screening, additional scenes were scripted and shot to expand this role.

== Music ==
The film score was composed by Tyler Bates, his first score for a major motion picture. The title theme is a remix of Roy Budd's theme ("Carter Takes a Train") from the 1971 film.

The film also features songs from artists such as Moby, Red Snapper, Mint Royale, The Accidentals, Faye Wong, Paul Oakenfold and Groove Armada.

== Release ==
=== Home media ===
Get Carter was released on DVD in Region 1 on February 13, 2001, and Region 2 on 24 June 2002. It was distributed by Warner Home Video.

== Reception ==
=== Box office ===
Get Carter flopped at the box office, grossing less than $20 million worldwide on a budget of $63.6 million.

=== Critical response ===
On the review aggregator website Rotten Tomatoes, 11% of 64 critics' reviews are positive, with an average rating of 3.7/10. The website's consensus reads: "Michael Caine shows up to collect a paycheck, and so does everyone else in this rote, middling remake." Metacritic, which uses a weighted average, assigned the film a score of 24 out of 100, based on 20 critics, indicating "generally unfavorable" reviews. Audiences polled by CinemaScore gave the film an average grade of "D+" on an A+ to F scale.

Shawn Levy of the Portland Oregonian gave an average review, saying that while "the film doesn't touch the original, it doesn't hit rock bottom, either." Kevin Thomas of the Los Angeles Times said the film is "not a terrible movie" but "too routine for its own good." Marc Savlov of The Austin Chronicle said that "the film itself is a muddle, but what is good is Stallone". Bob Graham of the San Francisco Chronicle said the film "is murkier than it needs to be, through no fault of Stallone's".

Todd McCarthy of Variety called the film "a useless remake." Elvis Mitchell of The New York Times said that the film is "so minimally plotted that not only does it lack subtext or context, but it also may be the world's first movie without even a text". Elizabeth Weitzman of the New York Daily News called the film "a throwaway story hidden beneath a messy jumble of weird camera angles, worthless editing tricks and an ill-placed, obnoxious score".

Among positive reviews, JoBlo.com praised "the sharp turn given by Sly Stallone, its groovy tunes, and its generally dark and gritty nature." Rob Blackwelder of SPLICEDWire called the film "a stimulating visual showcase of stylish film making that keeps a viewer's attention." David Keyes of Cinemaphile.org said, "If you strip the material of its ineffective level of performances, what we are left with is a concept that, at least at the core, is quite intriguing."

Later Stallone said: "Believe it or not, I think Get Carter was really underrated. That was a big disappointment. I learned the hard way that [remakes], even if you do it better than the original, there’s a tremendous nostalgia attached to the original. And quite often they’re not done as well."

=== Accolades ===
The film was nominated for Worst Actor (Sylvester Stallone) and Worst Remake or Sequel at the 21st Golden Raspberry Awards in 2000. At the 2000 Stinkers Bad Movie Awards, the film received four nominations: Worst Picture, Worst Director (Kay), Worst Actor (Stallone), and Worst Remake/Sequel.
