= Cool Breeze (film) =

1972 film

- Original Theatrical Poster
- Directed by: Barry Pollack
- Screenplay by: Barry Pollack
- Based on: The Asphalt Jungle by W. R. Burnett
- Produced by: Gene Corman
- Starring: Thalmus Rasulala; Judy Pace; Jim Watkins; Lincoln Kilpatrick; Raymond St. Jacques
- Cinematography: Andy Davis
- Edited by: Morton Tubor
- Music by: Solomon Burke
- Production company: Penelope Productions
- Distributed by: Metro-Goldwyn-Mayer
- Release date: July 2, 1972
- Running time: 101 minutes
- Country: United States
- Language: English

Cool Breeze is a 1972 American blaxploitation heist film directed and co-written by Barry Pollack and starring Thalmus Rasulala. It was released by Metro-Goldwyn-Mayer. The film is loosely based on W. R. Burnett's 1949 novel The Asphalt Jungle. It is the fourth film adaptation of the novel, after The Asphalt Jungle (1950), The Badlanders (1958) and Cairo (1963). The film was released with the tagline: "He hit the Man for $3 million. Right where it hurts. In the diamonds. And baby, that's cold."

== Plot ==
Sidney Lord Jones is a convicted felon who is granted an early release by the parole board in San Quentin. While imprisoned, he learns about the underworld diamond trade from reading and studying trade magazines. It motivates him to plan a heist to steal $3 million worth of diamonds from the largest diamond brokerage on the Pacific Coast.

After his release, Jones returns to Los Angeles and proposes the idea to ‘the Money Man’ Bill Mercer and "Stretch" Finian, in hopes that Mercer would provide the $50,000 seed money needed to set up the heist. Jones recommends using profits from the heist to start a community bank to support black-owned businesses, in addition the bank could be used to launder illegal business activities. Unbeknownst to Jones, Mercer is having financial difficulty and has little money. However, he agrees to provide the funds, but secretly plans to keep all the loot for himself. To accomplish the heist, Mercer and Jones assemble a group of men consisting of Travis Battle (‘the Muscle Man’) a well-known career criminal, Roy Harris (‘the Box Man’) an expert safe-cracker transformed into a Christian minister, and John Battle (‘the Driver’) an honest business man and half-brother of Travis. Unfortunately, after the successful robbery, the group finds themselves caught up in a string of unhappy accidents and double crosses.

== Cast ==
- Thalmus Rasulala as Sidney Lord Jones
- Jim Watkins as Travis Battle
- Judy Pace as Obalese Eaton
- Lincoln Kilpatrick as Lieutenant Brian Knowles
- Sam Laws as "Stretch" Finian
- Raymond St. Jacques as Bill Mercer
- Margaret Avery as Lark
- Pamela Grier as Mona
- Paula Kelly as Martha Harris
- Wally Taylor as John Battle
- Rudy Challenger as Reverend Roy Harris
- Stewart Bradley as Captain Lloyd Harmon
- Ed Cambridge as The Bus Driver
- Royce Wallace as Emma Mercer
- Stack Pierce as "Tinker"
- Biff Elliot as Lieutenant Carl Mager
- John Lupton as Lieutenant Holster

== Themes ==
Gender and sexuality in the film have been highly critiqued by film critics who noted the characters mistreatment of women. The director of the film very intentionally portrays the young women as sexy but lacking complexity. This is a common theme that can be noted in many black films in which "the sexual dimension of American racism is reflected in the motion picture portrayal of the black woman" as is stated by Edward Mapp in Black Women in Films (142).

Critics such as Roger Greenspun note that "Cool Breeze has rather a lot to say about sexy young girls, and about sex generally (much of it fairly brutal), and about whatever matters of practical philosophy happen to pass through the minds of its characters" (New York Times 1972).

== Reception ==
The film received very poor reviews overall. Critics reported that the characters were dry and lack dimension and the climax ended with a plot that seemed to lose its momentum. Much of the issues that were introduced in the beginning of the film were left unresolved by the end. Critics note that the film had a talented cast however the plot and character development was lacking. Though this is true, there were a few good scenes that were noted by film reviewers.

Roger Greenspun of the New York Times opened his review by writing, "From M‐G‐M, the company that gave you 'Gone With the Wind,' there now comes 'Cool Breeze,' a mostly black remake of 'The Asphalt Jungle'—also given you by M‐G‐M. Actually, the quality of blackness is somewhat strained, embracing as it does much of the cast, and most of the attitudes, and virtually all the ad campaign—but none of the major technical credits, including Gene Corman as producer and Barry Pollack, who directed and wrote the screenplay."

He cited that the film "really has nowhere to take its observations, since it is neither militant nor pacifist, but only, sporadically, ironic. And the film seems at each moment to be diminished below its potential even when it attempts strong bravado. Pollack directs some sequences very well, but he seems unsure of what matters dramatically and what doesn't, and he is unevenly served by his cast. The cast is only good in its sadness, and especially with Raymond St. Jacques as Mercer, the high‐powered fence (the Louis Calhern role in 'The Asphalt Jungle') who loses every thing except an understanding that the best use of the substance of life is to support a style."

== See also ==
- List of American films of 1972
- The Asphalt Jungle
- Hit Man - subsequent 1972 Blaxploitation film released by MGM
- The Slams - subsequent 1973 heist film released by MGM
- List of blaxploitation films
