= Ted Lewis (writer) =

British writer

- Born: Alfred Edward Lewis; 15 January 1940
- Died: 27 March 1982 (aged 42)
- Writing career
- Notable works: Jack's Return Home; Jack Carter's Law

Alfred Edward Lewis (15 January 1940 – 27 March 1982) was a British writer known for his crime fiction.

== Early life ==
Alfred Edward Lewis was born in Stretford, Manchester and was an only child. In 1946, the family moved to Barton-upon-Humber in Lincolnshire. As a child, Lewis contracted rheumatic fever and spent almost a year away from school in bed rest. During that time he read books and comics and drew constantly. From a young age he was a fan of film, particularly Western epics, B-movies and gangster pictures. He had a strict upbringing and his parents did not want their son to go to art school, but his English teacher Henry Treece, recognising his creative talents in writing and art, persuaded them not to stand in his way. Lewis attended Hull Art School for four years.

== Career ==
Lewis moved to London in 1961 with £70 he earned from his first illustration commission, the Alan Delgado children's book, The Hot Water Bottle Mystery. His first work in London was in advertising, and then as an animation specialist in television and films (among them the Beatles' Yellow Submarine). His first novel, All the Way Home and All the Night Through, was published in 1965, followed by Jack's Return Home, which created the noir school of British crime writing and pushed Lewis into the best-seller list. The novel was later retitled Get Carter after the success of the film of the same name, based on the novel and starring Michael Caine. After the collapse of his marriage Lewis returned to his home town.

Lewis wrote several episodes for the television series Z-Cars. Producer Graham Williams of Doctor Who, who had worked with Lewis on Z-Cars, commissioned a script entitled The Doppelgangers in 1978 from Lewis. However, the script was rejected early the next year, and was never put into production.

Lewis's final book, assessed as his best by some critics, was GBH, published in 1980, the title referring to grievous bodily harm in British law. Lewis died in 1982 aged 42 of alcohol-related causes.

In October 2017 Nick Triplow published a detailed biography Getting Carter: Ted Lewis and the Birth of Brit Noir.

In 2020 The Ted Lewis Centre opened in Barton upon Humber www.tedlewiscentre.com celebrating his life and works.

== Books ==
- All the Way Home and All the Night Through (1965)
- Jack's Return Home (1970) (paperback published in 1971 as Carter. Later re-published as Get Carter)
- Plender (1971)
- Billy Rags (1973)
- Jack Carter's Law (1974)
- The Rabbit (1975)
- Boldt (1976)
- Jack Carter and the Mafia Pigeon (1977)
- GBH (1980)

== Films ==
- Jack's Return Home has been filmed three times:
  - Get Carter (1971) with Michael Caine
  - Hit Man (1972) with Bernie Casey and Pam Grier
  - Get Carter (2000) with Sylvester Stallone
- Plender has been adapted as a French film:
  - Le Serpent (2007) directed by Éric Barbier
