= One-armed bandit murder =

1967 murder in England

The one-armed bandit murder was a criminal case in the north east of England. The case involved the murder of Angus Sibbet in 1967. The ensuing trial resulted in life sentences for Dennis Stafford and Michael Luvaglio. Both men were released on licence 12 years later.

== Notoriety ==
The case gained the nickname in the press as the "one-armed bandit murder", through the connection to the gambling industry, involving the supply of fruit machines, also known colloquially as one-armed bandits, to social clubs.

The case was one of the most notorious killings in the north east, and the first gangland killing sparking fears that organised crime was gaining a foothold in the north east. Luvaglio's Italian surname sparked the headline "The Mafia are coming." The trial was one of the biggest seen in the north east.

Both men have always insisted on their innocence, with Stafford alleging the murder was committed by a Scottish gangster and Luvaglio alleging it was part of a failed attempt by the Krays to enter the Newcastle club scene.

Luvaglio says that he was charged as Stafford's companion because, in his initial questioning, he refused to say that Stafford had left him on the night of the murder. Had Luvaglio made this statement, it was likely only Stafford would have been charged and convicted.

== Background ==
Organised crime was on the rise in Britain during the 1960s, with the most notable events being the gangland wars between the Krays and the Richardson Gang.

Sibbet was a money collector for a company run by Luvaglio's brother which supplied working men's clubs with fruit machines. The company supplied the entire north east representing a lucrative business for underworld gangs.

Sibbet, Luvaglio and Stafford were all friends and business associates. Luvaglio was a Londoner with Italian roots who had moved from London to Newcastle to work in his brother's business. Stafford was a self-confessed "playboy", whereas Luvaglio was less involved in crime and was not inclined to violence. Luvaglio asserted that Sibbet was a very good friend of his, even his best friend or like a brother.

== Murder ==
On the night of 4 January 1967, Luvaglio and Stafford were to meet Sibbet at the Birdcage club in Newcastle at 12.30am, 16 miles away from the eventual scene of discovery of Sibbet's body.

Sibbet's body was discovered the following morning at 5:15 a.m. by a miner in the back seat of his Jaguar, having been shot three times. The car was under Pesspool Bridge in South Hetton, County Durham.

== Trial ==
The trial took place at Newcastle Crown Court two months later.

As motive for his murder, the prosecution alleged Sibbet had been skimming the takings, estimated as £1,000 a week, supported by the fact he could afford to buy a Jaguar Mark 10.

Stafford and Luvaglio were both found guilty, and were sentenced to life in prison.

== Release and appeals ==
The pair were released from prison in 1979, freed on licence after serving 12 years, after two failed appeals while in prison.

The main doubts about the original trial surround the asserted time of death, proving which was key as the pair had alibis for all but a 45-minute window on the night, and the time of death had to be estimated as the body was only discovered at 5 am; the time was at least five hours prior, according to police. Witnesses were reported to have seen Sibbet alive in the car after the time of death, or nobody in the car.

Doubts were also expressed over the lack of any forensic evidence linking the pair to the scene, the actual presence of conflicting forensic evidence, and over the relevance of contradictory withheld evidence and witness statements and missing evidence.

In 2002, it was asserted by Stafford's legal team that a murder conviction on the evidence would not have been possible in modern times, and the case was taken to the Criminal Cases Review Commission which opened a review of the case in 2005. This later failed, as did an appeal in the House of Lords.

Stafford was re-imprisoned for two years in 1989 after breaching his licence by leaving the country, in the meantime setting up in business in South Africa. He was arrested after re-entering the country and being caught in a security check at a hotel where Mikhail Gorbachev was staying.

Both Stafford and Luvaglio had been fighting their cases on a separate basis, not speaking to each other since their original release. This was down to the separate backgrounds of the two men, and not due to any falling out. However, a reunion was held after 30 years in March 2008, when they embarked on a Judicial Review at the High Court. This failed, leaving the only recourse an appeal to Europe.

== Stafford parole judgement ==
Stafford was later imprisoned for forging traveller's cheques in 1994. Then Home Secretary Michael Howard kept him jailed overruling a parole board recommendation. This decision was later challenged at the European Court of Human Rights and in a landmark ruling in May 2002 the Court ruled that home secretaries had no power to overrule the parole board's decision and awarded damages.
