= Get Carter =

1971 British film by Mike Hodges

- Original UK film poster by Arnaldo Putzu
- Directed by: Mike Hodges
- Screenplay by: Mike Hodges
- Based on: Jack's Return Home (1970 novel) by Ted Lewis
- Produced by: Michael Klinger
- Starring: Michael Caine; Ian Hendry; John Osborne; Britt Ekland
- Cinematography: Wolfgang Suschitzky
- Edited by: John Trumper
- Music by: Roy Budd
- Production company: MGM-British Studios
- Distributed by: MGM-EMI Distributors
- Release dates: 3 February 1971 (Los Angeles); 10 March 1971 (United Kingdom)
- Running time: 112 minutes
- Country: United Kingdom
- Language: English
- Budget: £750,000

Get Carter is a 1971 British gangster thriller film, written and directed by Mike Hodges in his directorial debut and starring Michael Caine, Ian Hendry, John Osborne, Britt Ekland and Bryan Mosley. Based on Ted Lewis's 1970 novel Jack's Return Home, the film follows Jack Carter (Caine), a London gangster who returns to his home town of Newcastle in North East England after his brother's death. Suspecting foul play, and with vengeance on his mind, he investigates and interrogates, regaining a feel for the city and its hardened-criminal element.

Producer Michael Klinger took an option on Lewis's novel shortly after its publication and made a deal with the ailing Metro-Goldwyn-Mayer (MGM) to finance and release the film, making Get Carter the last project to be approved by the studio's Borehamwood division before its closure. The production went from novel to finished film in 10 months, with principal photography taking place from July to September 1970 in and around Newcastle upon Tyne, Gateshead and County Durham. Hodges, Klinger and Caine intended to create a more realistic portrayal of violence and criminal behaviour than had previously been seen in British films: Caine, who also served as an uncredited co-producer, incorporated aspects of criminal acquaintances into his characterisation of Carter, while Hodges conducted research into the criminal underworld of Newcastle, in particular the one-armed bandit murder. Cinematographer Wolfgang Suschitzky worked with Hodges to give scenes a naturalistic feel, drawing heavily on their backgrounds in documentary films.

Turning a respectable profit upon its initial UK release, Get Carter initially attracted mixed reviews. Critics appreciated the film's technical achievements and Caine's performance while criticising the complex plot, violence and amorality, in particular Carter's apparent lack of remorse for his actions. American critics were generally more enthusiastic, but the film languished on the drive-in circuit, while MGM focused its resources on producing Hit Man, a 1972 blaxploitation-themed remake of the film.

Get Carter eventually garnered a cult following, and further endorsements from directors such as Quentin Tarantino and Guy Ritchie led to the film being critically re-evaluated, with its depiction of class structure and life in 1970s Britain and Roy Budd's minimalist jazz score receiving considerable praise. In 1999, Get Carter was ranked 16th on the BFI Top 100 British films of the 20th century; five years later, a survey of British film critics in Total Film magazine chose it as the greatest British film of all time. A poorly received remake also titled Get Carter was released in 2000, with Sylvester Stallone portraying Jack Carter and Caine in a supporting role.

== Plot ==
Newcastle-born gangster Jack Carter has lived in London for years in the employ of organised crime bosses Gerald and Sid Fletcher. Jack is having an affair with Gerald's girlfriend Anna, and plans to escape with her to South America. First, he must return to Newcastle and Gateshead to attend the funeral of his brother, Frank, who has died in a purported drunk-driving accident. Jack's bosses warn him not to stir up trouble, as they are friendly with the Newcastle mob. Unsatisfied with the official explanation, Jack investigates for himself. At the funeral, Jack meets his teenage niece Doreen and Frank's evasive girlfriend, Margaret.

Jack goes to Newcastle Racecourse, seeking his old acquaintance Albert Swift for information about his brother's death, but Swift evades him. Jack encounters another old associate, Eric Paice, who refuses to tell Jack who is employing him as a chauffeur. Jack follows Eric to the country house of crime boss Cyril Kinnear. Jack confronts Kinnear but learns little from him; he also meets a glamorous drunken woman, Glenda. As Jack leaves, Eric warns him against damaging relations between Kinnear and the Fletchers. Back in Newcastle, Jack is threatened by henchmen who want him to leave town, but he fights them off, capturing and interrogating one to find out who wants him gone. He is given the name "Brumby".

Jack knows Cliff Brumby as a businessman with interests in local seaside amusement arcades. Visiting his house, Jack discovers Brumby knows nothing about him and, realising he has been set up, he leaves. The next morning, two of Jack's London colleagues – Con McCarthy and Peter the Dutchman – arrive, sent by the Fletchers to take him back, but he escapes. Jack meets Margaret to talk about Frank, but the Fletchers' men are waiting and pursue him. He is rescued by Glenda, who takes him in her sports car to meet Brumby at his new restaurant development at the top of a multi-storey car park. Brumby identifies Kinnear as being behind Frank's death, also explaining that Kinnear is trying to take over Brumby's business. He offers Jack £5,000 to kill the crime boss, which he refuses.

Jack has sex with Glenda at her flat, where he finds and watches a pornographic film in which Doreen is forced to have sex with Albert. The other participants in the film are Glenda and Margaret. Jack becomes enraged and pushes Glenda's head underwater as she is taking a bath. She tells him the film was Kinnear's and that she thinks Doreen was recruited by Eric. Forcing Glenda into the boot of her own car, Jack drives off to find Albert.

Jack tracks down Albert, who confesses he told Brumby that Doreen was Frank's daughter. Brumby showed Frank the film to incite him to call the police on Kinnear, so Eric and two of his men arranged Frank's death. Having extracted this information, Jack fatally stabs Albert. Jack is ambushed by the London gangsters and Eric, who has informed Gerald of Jack and Anna's affair. In the ensuing shootout, Jack kills Peter. As Eric and Con escape, they push Glenda's car into the river, unaware that she is in the boot. Returning to the car park, Jack finds and beats Brumby before throwing him to his death. He then posts the film to the Scotland Yard vice squad.

Jack abducts Margaret. He telephones Kinnear (who is in the middle of a wild party at his home), telling him that he has the film, and makes a deal for Kinnear to give him Eric in exchange for his silence. Kinnear agrees, sending Eric to an agreed location; however, he subsequently phones an associate, "J". Jack drives Margaret to the grounds of Kinnear's estate, kills her with a fatal injection and throws her stripped body into a pond there to make it look like an overdose. He then calls the police to raid Kinnear's party, and the police arrest Kinnear.

Jack chases Eric along a desolate beach. He forces Eric to drink a bottle of whisky as Eric had done to Frank, then beats him to death with his shotgun and disposes of the body on a coal conveyor. Having avenged Frank and Doreen, Jack walks along the shoreline, where he is shot dead from a distance by "J", Kinnear's assassin.

== Cast ==
- Michael Caine as Jack Carter. Mike Hodges wrote the screenplay with Ian Hendry in mind for Carter, but learned that Michael Klinger had already signed up Caine for the role. With the backing of a major studio, Klinger was keen to secure a big name for the lead, and Caine was very prominent at the time, having starred in Alfie, The Italian Job and The Ipcress File. Hodges was surprised that a star of Caine's stature would want to play such a thoroughly unlikeable person as Carter. Giving his reasons for wanting to be involved with the film, the actor said: "One of the reasons I wanted to make that picture was my background. In English movies, gangsters were either stupid or funny. I wanted to show that they're neither. Gangsters are not stupid, and they're certainly not very funny". He identified with Carter as a memory of his working-class upbringing, having friends and family members who were involved in crime and felt Carter represented a path his life might have taken under different circumstances: "Carter is the dead-end product of my own environment, my childhood; I know him well. He is the ghost of Michael Caine". He made subtle changes to Hodges's depiction of Carter in the script, cut out pleasantries and gave him a cold, hard edge; closer to Lewis's original envisioning of the character. Although he is not credited as such in the film, Caine has been acknowledged in retrospect as a co-producer. By a strange coincidence, Caine's stand-in on the film was a man called Jack Carter.
- Ian Hendry as Eric Paice. Hendry had previously been cast by producer Klinger in Roman Polanski's Repulsion, and was Hodges's first choice to play Carter, but by 1970 his career was rapidly declining. Hendry's alcoholism and poor physical condition were apparent on set in Newcastle, and his envy at the success of his contemporary Caine was exacerbated by his drinking. Hodges was concerned that the character's physical exertion at the film's climax may have been too much for Hendry, and so he arranged for it to be the first sequence shot as a precaution, so that he would not have to re-shoot the rest of the film if it were necessary to replace Hendry. Hodges and Caine used his animosity towards Caine to their advantage to create extra tension in the scenes between Carter and Paice.
- John Osborne as Cyril Kinnear, Jack's main adversary. Osborne, a famous playwright, was an unusual choice of actor; he was suggested by Hodges's agent. The writer enjoyed the change, and saw it as a way to erase the image in the public's mind of him as an angry young man. Osborne had never played card games before and practised poker before the shoot to lend realism to the gambling scene. Osborne's portrayal was a contrast to the description in Ted Lewis's novel Jack's Return Home of Kinnear as an uncultured, corpulent spiv, giving him an urbane and relaxed demeanour, his delivery being so relaxed and quiet that it was difficult for the sound recordist to pick up, but Hodges liked the "menace in that quietness".
- Britt Ekland as Anna. Ekland was cast as the leading lady of the film, as she was a prominent sex symbol of the time and would have already been familiar to US audiences through her work in The Night They Raided Minsky's and Stiletto. Accordingly, her minor role in the film was overemphasised in the publicity. Ekland was afraid of becoming typecast, having already played two gangster's molls before Carter in Stiletto and Machine Gun McCain. She was also reluctant to take the part as she did not want to take her clothes off; however, she had financial problems at the time as a result of bad investment decisions by her accountant. She was later happy that she had been involved with the project.
- Bryan Mosley as Cliff Brumby. MGM executives initially wanted Telly Savalas for the part of the "big man", but were impressed by Coronation Street actor Mosley's performance in fight scenes in Far from The Madding Crowd. A devout Roman Catholic, Mosley was concerned about taking part in such a violent film with depictions of criminal behaviour, and consulted his priest over the moral implications.
- George Sewell as Con McCarty. Sewell was the man who introduced Barbara Windsor to Charlie Kray. He grew up in working-class Hoxton and had come to acting late when, in 1959, he joined Joan Littlewood's Theatre Workshop. A well-known face on British television in the 1960s, his sandblasted features and shifty, haunted looks made him ideal for playing villainous characters or hard-bitten detectives. He seemed ideally cast as a London gangster colleague of Carter's. After Carter, Sewell became more known for playing policemen rather than villains.
- Tony Beckley as Peter the Dutchman. Lewis depicted Peter as a misogynistic homosexual in his novel; these elements were not emphasised in the film, although the character is flamboyant and camp. Beckley had developed a specialism of playing sadistic criminals, so his part in Carter was somewhat similar to his role of "Camp Freddy" alongside Caine in The Italian Job.
- Glynn Edwards as Albert Swift. Like Sewell, Edwards was an apprentice of Joan Littlewood's Theatre Workshop who had come to acting in his 30s. He had previously appeared alongside Caine in Zulu and The Ipcress File. After the film Edwards found work as a character actor and appeared regularly in the TV show Minder.
- Alun Armstrong as Keith Lacey. This was Armstrong's screen debut. The themes of Get Carter echo to a certain extent those of Armstrong's better-known role 25 years later in BBC drama Our Friends in the North. He wrote a letter to MGM when he learned it was making the film in Newcastle, and he was invited to meet director Mike Hodges, who wanted to cast local actors.
- Bernard Hepton as Thorpe. Bradford-born Hepton was cast by Hodges as Kinnear's nervous messenger.
- Petra Markham as Doreen Carter. Petra Markham was a 24-year-old experienced theatre actress when she was asked to play the role of Carter's 16-year-old niece. Her appearance in only four scenes in the film meant she could balance the film work with appearing at the Royal Court and her role in the television series Albert and Victoria. She went on to play the unfortunate Rose Chapman in EastEnders.
- Geraldine Moffat as Glenda. Moffatt was an experienced actress who had trained at the Bristol Old Vic Theatre School. She attracted Hodges's attention not just for her good looks, but for her work on Alun Owen's television plays for Half Hour Story (Stella) and Play of Tomorrow (Doreen).
- Dorothy White as Margaret. White had a successful career as a television actress and was particularly well known for Z-Cars, but the part of Margaret was her first credited cinematic role (the only other being a part in the 1955 film Touch & Go). She had previously worked with Mike Hodges on the ITV Playhouse installment Suspect.
- Rosemarie Dunham as Edna Garfoot, Carter's landlady. Although she had appeared in The Avengers and A Family at War on television, this was Scottish-born Dunham's film debut.
- John Bindon as Sid Fletcher. He was the son of a London cab driver who was discovered by Ken Loach in a pub. As a young man Bindon had been in and out of borstal, and spent most of his adult life associating with criminals, so he was ideally suited to play a gangland boss, despite being young, having intimate knowledge of that world. In the late 1970s his career suffered as he became entangled in accusations of protection racketeering in Fulham and was acquitted of murder at the Old Bailey.
- Terence Rigby as Gerald Fletcher, one of the London crime boss brothers. Rigby was another actor Hodges cast from his familiarity in television police drama.

Mike Hodges recruited a band of experienced character actors to play the small supporting roles. Godfrey Quigley was cast as Eddie Appleyard, a colleague of Frank Carter's. Kevin Brennan appears as Harry the card-player. Ben Aris, who plays one of the architects, had previously appeared in such films as if...., The Charge of the Light Brigade and Hamlet.

Carl Howard's character of the assassin, "J", is only identified by the initial on his ring, in his only film role, and an appropriate mystery surrounds his real identity. His name does not appear on the credits of some prints. Mike Hodges explained that Howard was an extra in his ITV Playhouse installment Rumour, and the director gave him a line to say, but another extra was wrongly credited. Hodges promised he would make it up to him and cast him in Carter, but his name was missed off some of the original prints. If you look closely, the assassin also appears briefly, twice in the same train compartment as Jack approaches Newcastle, smoking or reading a newspaper. When the film credits were printed in the Radio Times and TV Times, Howard was also trimmed. Hodges said in 2002 that "Carl and credits don't seem destined for each other".

== Production ==
=== Development ===
In the late 1960s, a relaxation in film censorship produced an increase in dark, uncompromising films, with many directors pushing the boundaries of acceptability. Get Carter was a film that explored this freedom. The project went from concept to finished film in just 10 months.

In 1969, producer Michael Klinger devised plans for a gangster film to capitalise on public interest in the British criminal underworld after the Kray Twins' convictions. Klinger was invited to view a first print of Peter Walker's Man of Violence (1969) and was unimpressed, telling the director "I'm going to make a gangster film, but it's going to cost a lot more than this and it's going to be better". After searching many publishers for material to adapt into a film, Klinger purchased the rights to Ted Lewis's novel Jack's Return Home. Andrew Spicer has written that "he [Klinger] sensed its potential to imbue the British crime thriller with the realism and violence of its American counterparts".

Klinger had been approached in 1969 by another producer, Nat Cohen, to make films for Metro-Goldwyn-Mayer (MGM). In financial trouble and shutting down its British operations, MGM was in the process of closing its British studios at Borehamwood and was looking to make smaller-budget films to turn a profit. At this time Klinger's friend Robert Littman had been appointed head of MGM Europe and so Klinger took his proposal to him.

MGM agreed to a reasonable but below-average budget of 750,000 (there is some dispute as to whether this figure refers to dollars or pounds) for the production. Within months of agreeing to the deal MGM had pulled out of the UK. Klinger had seen Mike Hodges's television film Suspect (1969) and immediately decided he was the ideal candidate to direct his new project. Hodges had also previously worked on current affairs programme World in Action, the arts programme Tempo and a 1968 children's television serial, The Tyrant King, and all these past experiences informed his approach to his film debut.

Klinger contacted Hodges on 27 January 1970 with a copy of Jack's Return Home and contracted him to write and direct the film, paying him a flat fee of £7,000 (£135,700 in 2024) for his services. Hodges's original working title for the film was Carter's The Name. Steve Chibnall writes: "his treatment retained the essential structure of Lewis's novel with its strong narrative drive, but introduced some minor changes to characterisation and more fundamental alterations to narratology". Given that Ted Lewis had not specified where his novel was set, Hodges felt free to relocate the story to a place he was familiar with, considering Grimsby, Lowestoft, Hull and North Shields before deciding on Newcastle upon Tyne. Hodges said he was influenced in his writing by the works of Raymond Chandler and Hollywood B-movies such as Kiss Me Deadly, because they showed "how to use the crime story as an autopsy on society's ills". He did not, however, employ a traditional noir technique of using a voiceover to expose the character's inner feelings. He also dispensed with flashbacks to Carter's youth featured in the novel which explored his relationship with his brother Frank, streamlining the plot to a linear narrative spanning a single weekend. As Chibnall writes:

The immediate consequence was the loss of the insights into Carter's motivations provided by his memories of boyhood and his relationships with brother Frank and delinquent gang leader Albert Swift. Also lost was the backstory of Carter's dealings with Eric Paice during their time as rival gangsters in London, in particular, Eric's violent treatment of Carter's lover Audrey (Anna in the screenplay) the memory of which fuels Carter's hatred.

The significance of the double-barrelled shotgun as Carter's choice of weapon (which in the novel symbolises family ties and Carter's memories of more innocent times hunting with his brother) was lost in the film adaptation.

Carter's killing of Brumby and his own assassination were further alterations from the novel, emphasising the film's parallels with revenge tragedy and Carter's role as what Geoff Mayer calls "the moral agent [...] a "knight" forced to dispense his own sense of justice in a corrupt world". However, in his DVD commentary Hodges implies that he did not see Carter as morally any more justified than those he kills, and his death is intended to present his actions to the audience as morally bankrupt and futile: "I wanted him to be dealt with in exactly the same way he dealt with other people. Now that's a sort of Christian ethic in a way [...] That was a prerequisite of the film for me, that the hitman should go [click] and that's it". Hodges's decision to kill off Carter was initially protested by MGM executives, as they wanted the character to survive in the event that the film proved successful enough to warrant a sequel.

=== Casting ===
There was pressure from MGM to have big-name Hollywood stars in the film, which was successfully resisted by Hodges. As well as Telly Savalas, names posited by Klinger and studio executives were Joan Collins, and someone Hodges described as "the Canadian lead actress in TV's Peyton Place", which is likely a reference to Barbara Parkins. The production also utilised a large number of extras, most of whom were locals who just happened to be on scene when filming was happening. Others were sourced from local casting company Beverley Artistes, which sent everyone registered with it for auditions, one of these being Denea Wilde, who was cast as the pub singer. Several of the company's actors were also in background shots in the film including the casino, streets, bars and the police raid scene.

=== Pre-production ===
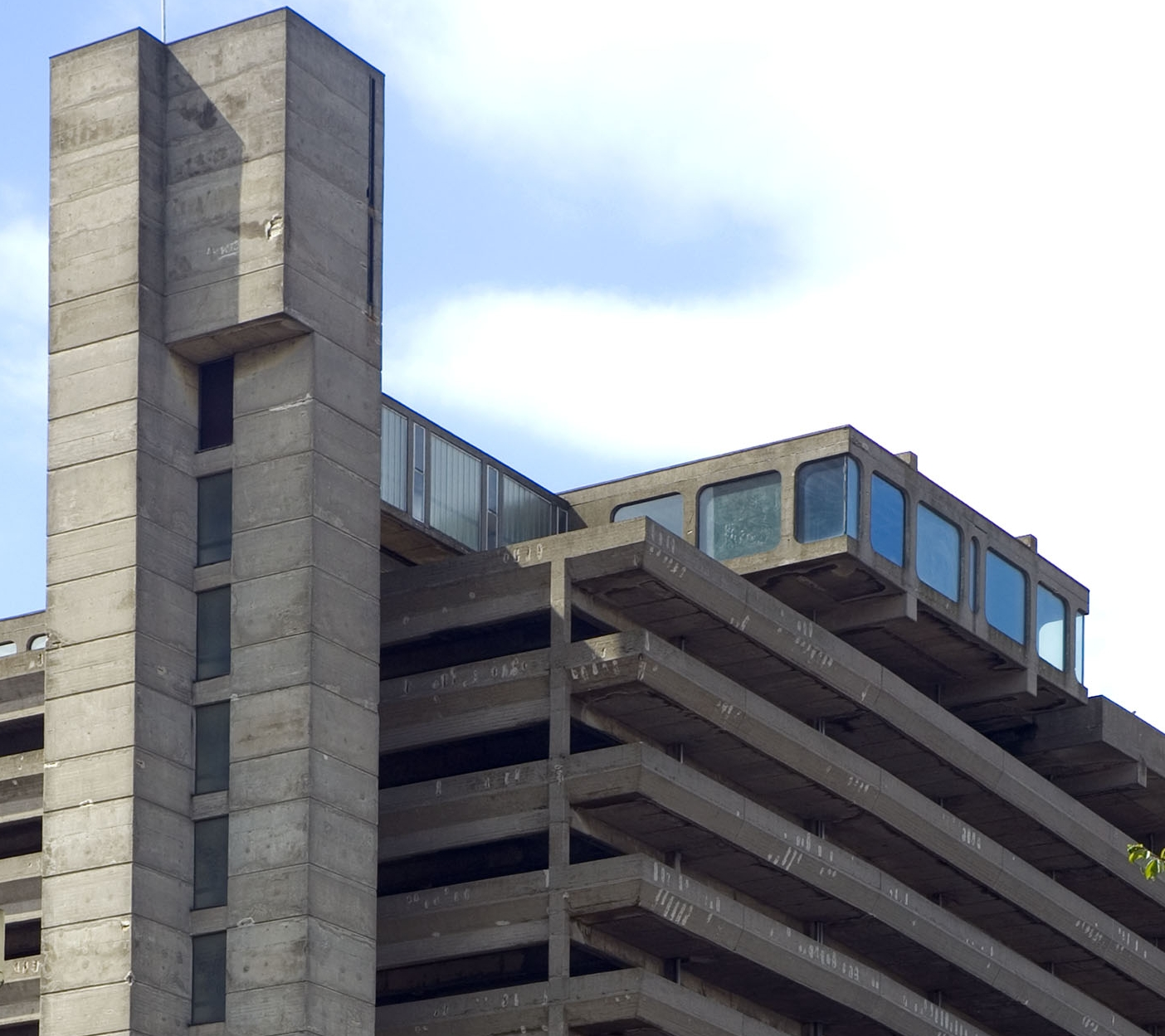
Trinity Square car park, with Brumby's rooftop cafe, was demolished in 2010.

Locations along the east coast of England had been scouted by Hodges and Klinger in the spring of 1970, to find a landscape that suggested a "hard, deprived background". Newcastle was selected after Hodges's first choice of Hull proved to be unsuitable. Hodges thoroughly researched the local Newcastle crime scene, adapting the script to make use of settings and incorporating elements of his research into the story. His background at World in Action had made him accustomed to making films based on hard investigation and this informed his approach to Get Carter. One of the first locations which attracted Hodges's attention was the Trinity Square multi-storey car park, which dominated the centre of Gateshead. To Hodges, the car park and the cast iron bridges over the Tyne, "seemed to capture the nature of Jack Carter himself". The car park embodies one of the film's more subtle themes, which is the destruction of an old cityscape and its rebuilding in line with modern Brutalism. Hodges described how wandering alone through the upper structure, he realised how the different levels could be used to reveal the hunter, Carter, and the hunted, Brumby, simultaneously but without either being aware of the other – adding to the suspense. The shopping centre and car park were closed in early 2008 and demolished in late 2010.

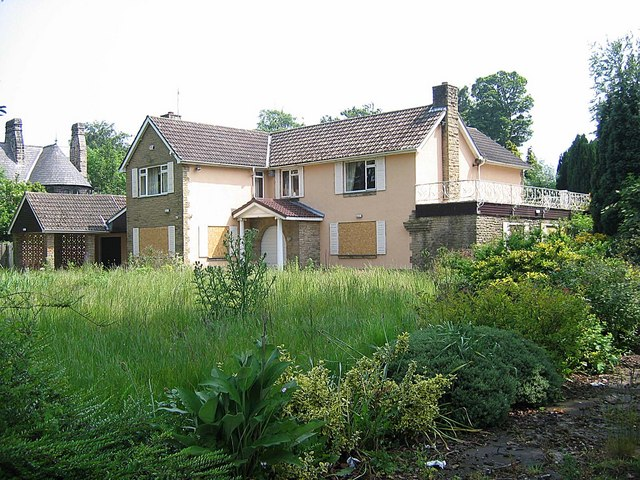
Beechcroft, Broomside Lane, County Durham, the location of Cliff Brumby's house, awaiting demolition in 2007. Beechcroft stood derelict for many years and was finally demolished in December 2008, despite a campaign to preserve it as a tourist attraction.

The location for Cyril Kinnear's house, Dryderdale Hall, near Hamsterley, Bishop Auckland, provided a real-life connection with organised crime. It was the recently vacated country house of North East fruit machine businessman Vince Landa, who had fled the country in 1969 after the murder of his right-hand man Angus Sibbett, the so-called one-armed bandit murder. Many believed the crime was part of a failed attempt by the Kray twins to gain control of the Newcastle underworld. Michael Klinger and the MGM publicity spokesman dismissed the use of the location as mere coincidence; however, Hodges was aware of the significance of the house and chose it deliberately. Steve Chibnall writes "It proved a perfect location, wreaking [sic] of authenticity and full of useful details such as the cowboys and Indians wallpaper [...] the African shield and crossed spears on the wall of the crime lord's living room". The Landa case also is referenced at the start of the film with a shot of a newspaper bearing the headline "Gaming Wars". Other locations in Newcastle and Gateshead, Northumberland and County Durham were also used.

=== Filming ===
Principal photography took place in the North East between 17 July and 15 September 1970. Hodges favoured the use of long focal length lenses (as he had used previously on Rumour) in many scenes to create a naturalistic documentary feel, especially in crowd scenes. The film was shot in Metrocolor, which was MGM's trade name for films processed at its Eastmancolor laboratory. This lab processed Kodak's Eastman Color Negative, so it is most likely the film was shot on this stock. Asked to comment on what he was aiming for in the look of the film, cinematographer Wolfgang Suschitzky said "The camera work on it [...] it was very influenced by Mike Hodges who has a very good eye for setups and he of course conferred with his operator and myself, but he influenced all of us, and much of the good look is due to him, I confess. My main task was lighting on location, very moderately, and waiting for the right daylight and setting the exposure on the lens". In the first week of shooting in Newcastle, the ACTT called the crew out on a one-day strike. At the advice of Richard Lester, Hodges and his assistant director stayed at a separate hotel to the rest of the cast and crew, which enabled him to have some respite from the production after the shooting day was done. Klinger was present on set for much of the film shoot. However, Hodges said he encountered very little interference from the producer. At one point Klinger and Caine asked if Hodges might work in a "chase sequence", but he persuaded them that it would draw too many comparisons with Bullitt (a chase sequence between Carter and the London gangsters is mentioned in the shooting script). Hodges tried to rehearse the racecourse scene between Caine and Hendry in their hotel the night before shooting, but "Hendry's drunken and resentful state forced Hodges to abandon [the] attempt". Hodges described Caine as "a complete dream to work with". Caine only lost his temper once on set, during the very tense and emotional day filming in Glenda's flat, when the focus puller ruined his first take. Caine apologised immediately.

The most complicated scene to shoot was Kinnear's game of cards. There are four simultaneous conversations, with a lot of plot exposition and the introduction of two important characters, Kinnear and Glenda. The technical complexity was compounded by the variation in light coming through the windows, and Osborne's whispered delivery which made microphone placement difficult. Hodges moved the camera and the boom closer to Osborne as the scene progressed. Chibnall says that Hodges regretted not rehearsing the scene more thoroughly.

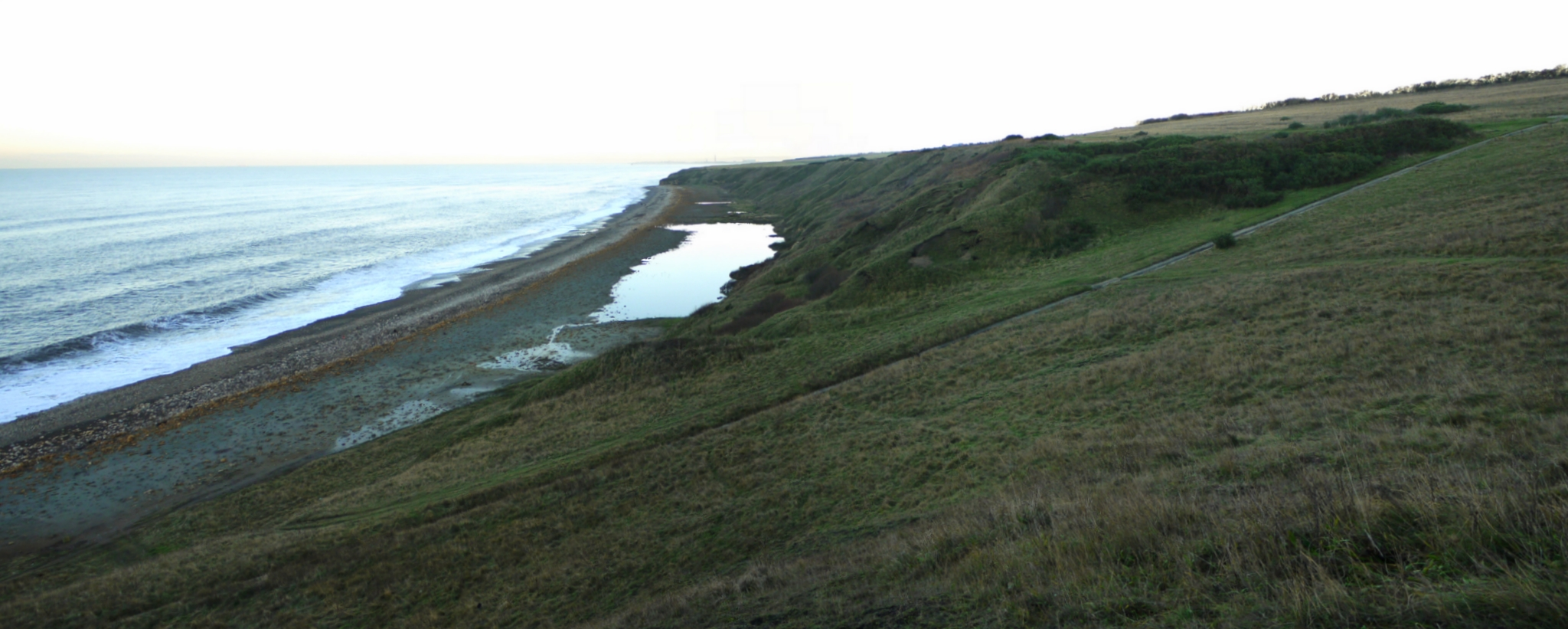
The location of the closing scene of the film, Blackhall Beach near Hartlepool

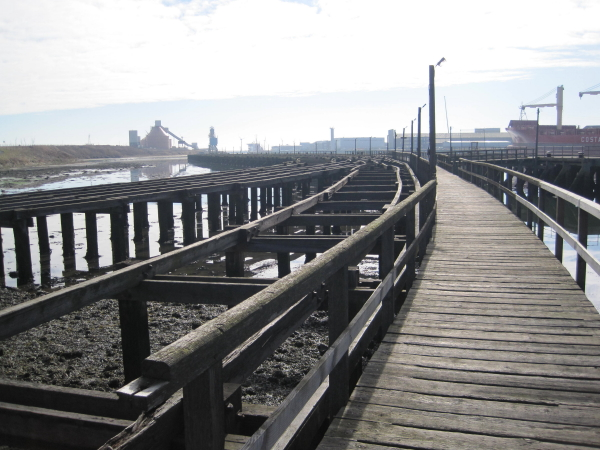
Base of the North Side coal staithes, North Blyth, Northumberland. Near the film's conclusion, Carter chases Paice along these. The tops of the staithes as they appear in the film have been demolished; only the base of the structure remains.

In shooting the scene in which Carter throws Brumby to his death from the multi-storey car park, Hodges used four shots: one of the pair struggling high up on the stairs; one from the lowest level of the stairwell where Caine actually threw Bryan Mosley over the side onto mattresses; one shot of a dummy falling; and one of the body of Brumby on top of a crushed car.

Carter's climactic pursuit of Eric used an amalgamation of two locations spaced 35 miles (56 km) apart: Blyth staithes and Blackhall Beach near Blackhall Colliery. The chase scene was shot in reverse, with Hodges filming Eric's death scene first because of Hendry's poor condition, Hodges being worried that he would be too out of breath to play the death scene after running. Hodges chose the beach for its bleak, dark atmosphere but when he returned to shoot the scene he found it bathed in bright sunshine, unsuitable for the sombre conclusion he was hoping for. He waited hours until the sun began setting to capture the overcast shadowy lighting seen in the film. The film shows the beach black with coal spoilings, dumped there by the mine's conveyor system. The conveyor, a common sight on the East Durham coast, was known locally as The Flight. In the early 2000s, £10 million was spent removing these conveyors and the concrete towers, and cleaning tonnes of coal waste from the beaches of East Durham. The cleaning programme was known as Turning the Tide.

=== Post-production ===
Klinger was a hands-on producer who remained present throughout shooting and in post-production. He suggested Hodges use John Trumper as editor. Hodges said that he and Trumper argued and disagreed constantly, but he still thought he was a "brilliant, brilliant editor" and was "very grateful to him for [...] how much he contributed". Sound editing and dubbing was done by Jim Atkinson, whom Hodges described as "so obsessive about the job". He gave Hodges multiple possibilities of how the sound could be dubbed, and explored every angle. Klinger was worried that the debut director might be overwhelmed with too many options, but Hodges said he and Atkinson got on very well.

=== Music ===
The majority of the film's music was composed by Roy Budd, a jazz pianist and composer, who had previously worked on soundtracks for Soldier Blue and Flight of the Doves. Aside from its score, Budd also composed three songs: "Looking For Someone", "Love Is A Four Letter Word" (with lyrics by Jack Fishman) and "Hallucinations". The theme (otherwise known as "Carter Takes a Train"), the best-known piece from the film, was played by Budd and the other members of his jazz trio, Jeff Clyne (double bass) and Chris Karan (percussion), and was recorded on a budget of £450 (£8,700 in 2024). The musicians recorded the soundtrack live, direct to picture, playing along with the film. To save time and money Budd did not use overdubs, simultaneously playing a real harpsichord, a Wurlitzer electric piano and a grand piano. Budd described the experience as "uncomfortable, but it sounded pleasant". The theme tune features the sounds of the character's train journey from London to Newcastle.

The theme was released as a 7" vinyl single by Pye Records in 1971, titled simply "Carter" and backed with "Plaything", another piece composed for the soundtrack. Original copies of the record are much sought after by collectors and sell for around £100. The soundtrack—including pieces not used in the film—was originally only available in its entirety in Japan, where it was released on Odeon Records. It was released in the UK in 1998 by the Cinephile label, a subsidiary of Castle Communications. In 2012, the theme was included on the Soul Jazz Records compilation British TV, Film and Library Composers.

The film includes other music which is not included on the soundtrack LP. The music playing in the nightclub scene is an uptempo cover of the 1969 Willie Mitchell tune "30-60-90" performed live by the Jack Hawkins Showband, which was the resident band at the Oxford Galleries night club. The pub singer, played by Denea Wilde, performs a cover of "How About You?" by Burton Lane and Ralph Freed, a song more associated with glamorous Hollywood films than the backrooms of Newcastle pubs. The Pelaw Hussars, a local juvenile jazz band and majorette troupe, also appear and perform two numbers, "When The Saints Go Marching In" and "Auld Lang Syne".

== Release ==
=== Theatrical ===
A London AEC Routemaster bus bearing promotional posters for Get Carter.

The world premiere for Get Carter was held in Los Angeles on 3 February 1971. The film finally opened for general release across the UK on 10 March 1971 and in the US on 18 March, where it was rated 'X' for violence and female nudity, meaning it was for adults only. It was later reclassified as 'R', meaning children under the age of 17 had to be accompanied by an adult. A censored version was released in West Germany on 6 August 1971, with a running time nine minutes shorter than the original. Michael Klinger was involved in promotion of the film in the UK, using the experience from his background as a distributor to conduct a strong advertising campaign. Teaser posters for the film appeared on the front of buses across London, featuring the tagline "Caine is Carter".

The original British quad poster with artwork by Arnaldo Putzu, in common with many film posters, has aspects or images that differ from the finished screen version. Carter is depicted wearing a gaudy floral jacket, as opposed to the dark raincoat and mohair suit he wears in the film. Asked in 2006, Putzu could not remember his artistic rationale for painting the floral jacket, but said he was painting a lot of flowers in designs at that time. Chibnall describes the flower power imagery as "what seems like a desperate and misguided attempt to suggest the hipness of a genre which had largely fallen out of favour". However, movie poster expert Sim Branaghan liked its eccentricity, calling it was "that kind of quirkiness you wouldn't get these days". Jonny Trunk of Trunk Records—a long-time aficionado of the film and its history—has observed that the floral pattern of Carter's jacket is taken from the distinctive pillow and matching sheet design from the bed in the scene where Britt Ekland writhes naked whilst on the phone to Jack. The poster also places Carter's shotgun in Eric's hands, and features a grappling man and woman who seem to belong to a different film. Promotional shots and poster artwork exist from the film showing Carter holding a pump-action shotgun; in the finished film, the only shotgun used by Carter is a double-barrelled shotgun, which Carter finds on top of his brother Frank's wardrobe.

MGM sold distribution rights to the film in the U.S. to its future subsidiary United Artists, which promoted it poorly, amid worries the cockney dialogue in the opening scene would be unintelligible to U.S. audiences. The film's release was delayed while parts of the film were redubbed, with no great improvement. In the process of redubbing the opening, the version of the film with the original dialogue was lost. For years the version shown on British television was the redubbed American cut. UA placed the film on the declining drive-in movie circuit, where it played at the bottom of a double bill with Dirty Dingus Magee, a vehicle for Frank Sinatra. Michael Klinger complained in 1974 to president of UA Eric Pleskow about the lacklustre promotion of Carter, and tried to get him to relinquish the U.S. rights to the film so that Klinger could find a better distributor.

The film did not encounter many censorship problems, although the scene where Carter knifes Albert Swift caused concern for British censor John Trevelyan. In South Africa the censor cut out Britt Ekland's phone sex scene, shortening her already brief role; her name was still left on the poster, leaving filmgoers to wonder why she was advertised as appearing.

A resurgence of critical and public interest in the film in the 1990s led to the British Film Institute (BFI) releasing a new print of the film in 1999. It worked with Hodges to restore the film, with Hodges sourcing another set of negatives of the original opening, which were found in the archives of the BBC. The team then spliced the beginning segment onto a high-quality print of the film. The reissue premiered at the National Film Theatre and went on general release on 11 June 1999, showing at the Tyneside Cinema in Newcastle.

On 16 March 2022, the BFI announced that they would be partnering with Warner Bros. and Warner Bros. Home Entertainment for a re-release of the film at the BFI Southbank as part of their retrospective program Return of the Outsider: The Films of Mike Hodges, which ran from May 1 to May 31 and included various in-person events such as "Mike Hodges in Conversation" on May 3; this was followed by a wide release in British and Irish cinemas on 27 May. This release utilised a new 4K restoration of the film's original camera negative, which was approved by Hodges.

=== Home media ===
Chibnall has established that the film was shown on LWT in 1976 and 1980 "in a bowdlerised version" (which edited out Britt Ekland's phone sex scene) and once on Westward Television and on Granada in August 1981, but it was not shown nationally and in its entirety until a post-watershed BBC broadcast in 1986. It was finally released on home media in 1993 by MGM/UA as part of its "Elite Collection". Chibnall says "There was no advertising to suggest a significant event had occurred. It was simply a part of the long process of exploiting MGM's back catalogue in the run-up to Christmas". Despite this, the release was given a five-star review in Empire, where it was described as "one of the best British films of the 70s". Chibnall notes "it did not, however, find a place in Empire's top fifty videos of the year".

Warner Bros. reissued the film in a special edition on DVD in October 2000 in its original 1.85:1 aspect ratio. Extras included three trailers; the international trailer, an introduction by Michael Caine to the people of Newcastle, and a third featuring Roy Budd playing the opening theme. This format was also used in a 2001 VHS set released by Warner, which included Bullitt and Shaft. Also included on the DVD was commentary from Caine, Hodges and Suschitzky, constructed from separate interviews with the three. The soundtrack was presented in 1.0 mono Dolby Digital.

The film was bundled in the 2008 "Movies That Matter – 70's Classics" DVD set with Deliverance and Dog Day Afternoon. It is available from the Warner Archive Collection as a Made on Demand (MOD) DVD-R or a download, with the same extras as the 2000 release, although with only two trailers and this time in 16:9 ratio.

Get Carter was released on Blu-ray Disc by Warner on April 22, 2014; this release features the same extras as the special edition DVD, but due to a manufacturing error, American pressings of the disc utilize the dubbed American version of the opening sequence instead of the original audio. This change was carried over to the initial British pressings of the disc, but was later reversed following public backlash; later British pressings sold by outlets such as Amazon UK feature the original audio track.

BFI Video released its 4K restoration of Get Carter on August 1, 2022 on standard and Ultra HD Blu-ray; the two-disc sets include the special features of earlier home media releases of the film, as well as a new audio commentary with critics Kim Newman and Barry Forshaw, an isolated music track, interviews with Hodges, Trunk Records founder Jonny Trunk, actress Petra Markham and Michael Klinger's son Tony, Philip Trevelyan's 1966 documentary film The Ship Hotel, Tyne Main, a booklet containing various essays on the film and other paraphernalia, postcards and a double-sided poster for both the restoration and a replication of the original UK poster art.

== Reception ==
=== Critical response ===
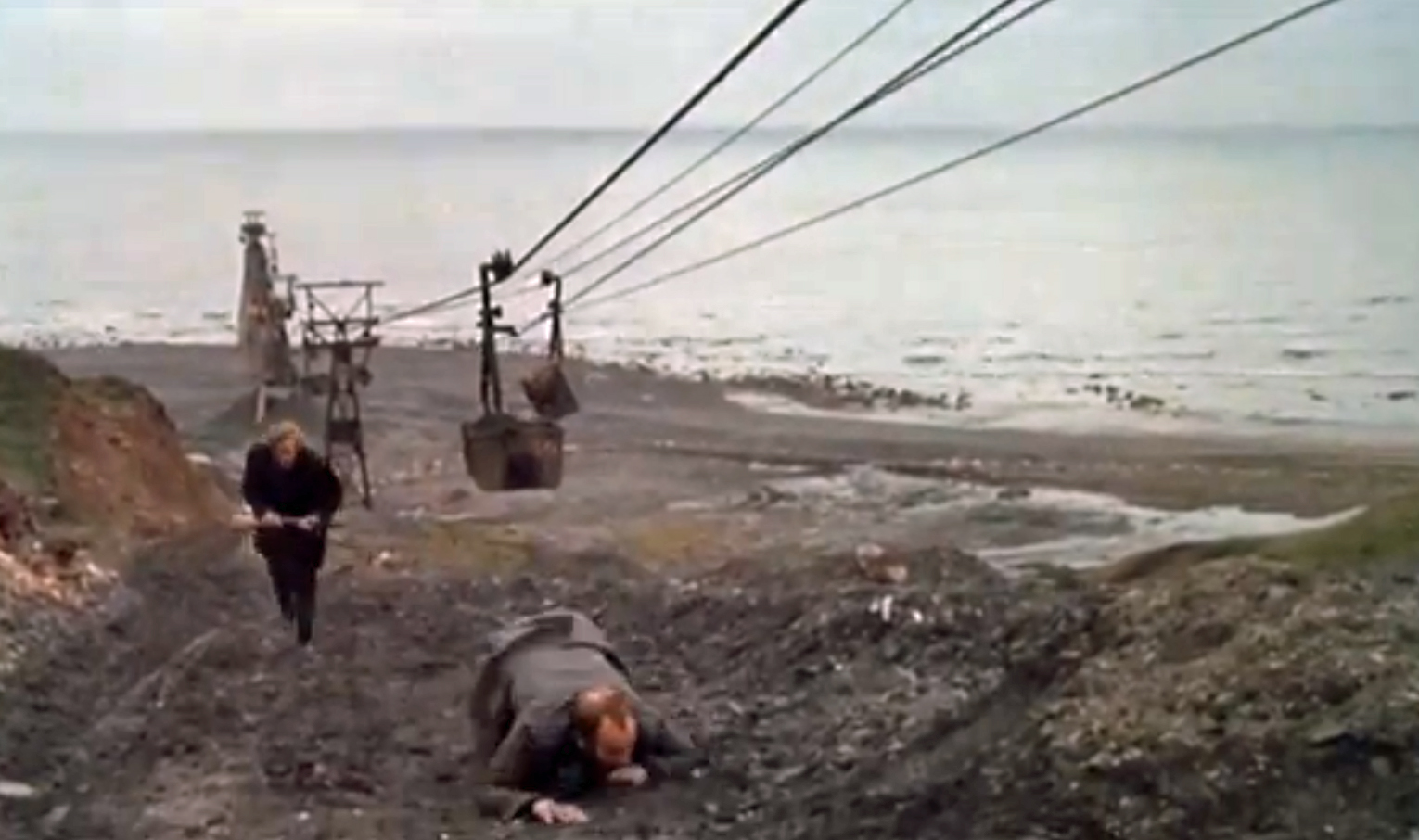
Jack's pursuit of Eric as seen in the film's trailer

On Rotten Tomatoes, the film has an approval rating of 85% based on 40 reviews, with an average rating of 7.50/10; the site's critical consensus reads "Darkly entertaining and tightly wound, Get Carter is a gritty revenge story done right". Metacritic, which uses a weighted average, assigned the film a score of 80 out of 100, based on 15 critics, indicating "generally favorable" reviews. In 2003, Steve Chibnall observed a large gender imbalance in voting on the film up to April 2002, with less than 6% of votes cast (where the voters gave their gender) by women (53 out of 947). He also noticed a substantial increase in women voting on the film in the eight months leading up to April 2002.

Describing the initial critical response to the film, Steve Chibnall wrote "Initial critical vilification or indifference establishes the conditions in which a cult can flourish. Get Carter had to make do with ambivalence". He thought the general stance of British critics "was to admire the film's power and professionalism while condemning its amorality and excessive violence". Geoff Mayer observed that "Mainstream critics at the time were dismayed by the film's complex plotting and Carter's lack of remorse". In Sight and Sound, Tom Milne said the film was well-constructed and had good characterisation, but lacked the mystery and charisma of the earlier American crime films it attempted to emulate. He found Carter's motivations were inconsistent, either being an avenging angel or an "authentic post-permissive anti-hero, revelling in the casual sadism".

In contrast, Nigel Andrews found the characters to be clichéd archetypes of the criminal underworld, such as the "homosexual chauffeur, bloated tycoon, glamorous mistress", describing the film as "perfunctory". Richard Weaver in Films and Filming praised the realism of the film, describing it as "crime at its most blatant", while George Melly writing in The Observer confessed to vicarious enjoyment of it, but admitted it was "like a bottle of neat gin swallowed before breakfast. It's intoxicating all right, but it'll do you no good".

Steve Chibnall writes that "America was rather more used to hard-boiled storytelling" and that reviewers there were "more prepared than British criticism to treat Get Carter as a serious work", Pauline Kael admiring its "calculated soullessness" and wondering if it signalled a "new genre of virtuoso viciousness". US publication Box Office gave a cautiously approving review, describing the film as "nasty, violent and sexy all at once". It predicted that "It should please in the action market, but won't win any laurels for Caine although his portrayal of the vicious anti-hero impresses". The reviewer also opined that "Tighter editing would help considerably". Roger Ebert was less reserved in his praise, writing that "the movie has a sure touch". He noted the "proletarian detail" of the film which is "unusual in a British detective movie. Usually we get all flash and no humanity, lots of fancy camera tricks but no feel for the criminal strata of society". Of Caine's performance he wrote, "The character created by Caine is particularly interesting. He's tough and ruthless, but very quiet and charged with a terrible irony". Judith Crist in New York magazine gave a glowing review, saying "Michael Caine is superb, suave and sexy" and describing the film as "a hard, mean and satisfying zinger of the old tough-tec school done in frank contemporary terms". Variety also praised the film, saying it "not only maintains interest but conveys with rare artistry, restraint and clarity the many brutal, sordid and gamy plot turns". However, Jay Cocks writing in Time was disparaging, calling the film "a doggedly nasty piece of business" and comparing it unfavourably to Point Blank. The film appeared on several US critics' lists of best films of the year.

In Michael Klinger's The Guardian obituary in 1989, Derek Malcolm remembered the film as "one of the most formidable British thrillers of its time".

=== Box office ===
Get Carter was a financial success, and according to Steve Chibnall its box office takings were "very respectable". On its opening week at ABC2 cinema at Shaftesbury Avenue, London, it broke the house record, taking £8,188. It out-performed Up Pompeii, which was showing in the larger ABC1. It also performed strongly when moved to the ABCs in Edgware and Fulham Road. On its general release in the North of England, Chibnall notes it had a "very strong first week", before an unseasonal heatwave damaged cinema attendance. Chibnall writes that "Interestingly, although [the film's] downbeat and unsentimental tone is now thought to express the mood of its times, the mass cinema audience preferred Love Story (1970), which remained the most popular film in Britain throughout Get Carter's run". It was the sixth-most popular "general release" movie at the British box office in 1971.

=== Accolades ===
At the time of its release, the only recognition the film received was a 1972 BAFTA Awards nomination for Ian Hendry as Best Supporting Actor. In 1999, Get Carter was ranked 16th on the BFI Top 100 British films of the 20th century; five years later, a survey of British film critics in Total Film magazine chose it as the greatest British film of all time. In 2008 the film was placed at 225 on Empire's 500 Best Movies of All Time list, which was selected by over 10,000 Empire readers, 150 filmmakers and 50 film critics. In October 2010 the critics from The Guardian newspaper placed the film on their list of "Greatest Films of All Time", placing it at number 7 in the 25 greatest crime films. In the accompanying poll conducted amongst Guardian readers, it was voted fifth. In 2011 Time Out London placed the film at 32 in its 100 Best British Films list, which was selected by a panel of 150 film industry experts.

== Remakes ==
=== Hit Man (1972) ===
In 1972, MGM released the blaxploitation film Hit Man, written and directed by George Armitage and produced by Gene Corman; the film's credits identify Lewis's Jack's Return Home as its basis. This was the second time that Corman had produced a blaxploitation film based on a novel that had previously been adapted for film, following Cool Breeze (1972), the fourth adaptation of W. R. Burnett's The Asphalt Jungle. However, Hodges and critics have identified Hit Man as a remake of Get Carter, transposing the action from Newcastle to Los Angeles. The film stars Bernie Casey as Tyrone Tackett, the story's counterpart to Jack Carter, while Glenda is reimagined as Gozelda, a "sultry skin flick star" portrayed by Pam Grier.

Armitage revealed that he had not seen Get Carter at the time he worked on the film, and that Corman had given him an untitled copy of Hodges's script, asking him to rewrite it in an African-American context; he did not learn that the film was based on Get Carter until he was informed by his agent. While the films share several plot details and treatments, such as a sniper aiming at Carter/Tackett on a rocky beach, Hit Man includes several divergences from Get Carter, including a scene in which Gozelda is mauled to death by tigers, and does not end with the main character's death.

Hodges and Klinger were incensed by MGM's decision to remake the film, as they considered Hit Man inferior to Get Carter; Lewis later claimed that he never received any royalties from Hit Man. The film was released by Warner Archive Collection as a MOD DVD-R on May 4, 2010.

=== Get Carter (2000) ===
Warner Bros., which holds the rights to the pre-1986 MGM library, produced another remake of Get Carter in 2000 under the same title, starring Sylvester Stallone as Jack Carter. Originally announced in 1997, Tarsem Singh and Samuel Bayer were considered to direct the film before Stephen Kay signed on, with David McKenna writing the script. As with Hit Man, the film credited Ted Lewis's Jack's Return Home as its source, not Hodges's film, and again it contains scenes that are directly borrowed from the original, such as the opening train ride. It also uses a remix of Roy Budd's original theme ("Carter Takes a Train"), arranged by Tyler Bates. Michael Caine appears as Cliff Brumby, in what Elvis Mitchell described as "a role that will increase regard for the original", speculating that "maybe that was his intention". Mickey Rourke plays the villain Cyrus (instead of 'Eric') Paice.

The remake was compared unfavourably to the original by the majority of reviewers. The consensus opinion of critics on Rotten Tomatoes is that it was "a remake that doesn't approach the standard of the original, Get Carter will likely leave viewers confused and unsatisfied. Also, reviews are mixed concerning Stallone's acting". It was so badly received on its US release that Warner Bros. decided not to give it a UK theatrical release, anticipating the film would be savaged by British critics and fans. Elvis Mitchell in The New York Times wrote "it's so minimally plotted that not only does it lack subtext or context, but it also may be the world's first movie without even a text". Mike Hodges said in 2003 he had still not seen the remake, but was informed by a friend that it was "unspeakable". His son brought him a DVD of the film back from Hong Kong and he tried to watch it, but the region format was incompatible "so we put it in the dustbin".

The film was voted the worst remake of all time in 2004 by users of British DVD rental website ScreenSelect (precursor of Lovefilm). On 13 February 2001, the remake was released on Region 1 DVD by Warner Bros. Home Entertainment.

== Legacy ==
Tom Cox writes that many British filmmakers "have stolen from Hodges without matching the cold, realistic kick" of Get Carter. Films such as The Long Good Friday, Face and Lock, Stock and Two Smoking Barrels borrow from the film's blueprint. Steven Soderbergh's 1999 film The Limey is a homage to Get Carter and other British gangster films, and contains similar plot elements and themes of revenge, family and corruption. Soderbergh said he envisioned The Limey as "Get Carter made by Alain Resnais". Shane Meadows' film Dead Man's Shoes has also drawn comparisons to Get Carter, being similarly a revenge gangster story set around a provincial English town. The production team of the television series Life on Mars also cited Get Carter as one of their influences for the programme.

The film's music also enjoyed its own resurgence in popularity, for it tapped into a 1990s interest in vintage film soundtracks. Portishead's Adrian Utley explained that they found the music to Get Carter inspiring because "it was done quickly and cheaply with only a few instruments, and it had to be intensely creative to disguise its limitations". The Human League 1981 album Dare contains a track covering the Get Carter theme, although it was only a version of the sparse leitmotif that opens and closes the film as opposed to the full-blooded jazz piece that accompanies the train journey. Stereolab covered Roy Budd's theme on their 1998 compilation album Aluminum Tunes, although they call their version "Get Carter", as opposed to its proper title, "Main Theme (Carter Takes A Train)". This Stereolab version was subsequently used as a sample in the song "Got Carter" by 76. The Finnish rock band Laika & the Cosmonauts cover the film's theme on their 1995 album The Amazing Colossal Band. BB Davis & the Red Orchidstra released a version of the film's title theme in 1999. Jah Wobble produced a dub cover version of the theme tune in 2009. Wobble had long been a fan of the bassline of the track, saying in a 2004 interview with The Independent that "There are some bass lines that contain the whole mystery of creation within them".

== See also ==
- BFI Top 100 British films
- List of cult films
