= Jack's Return Home =

1970 novel by Ted Lewis

- First edition
- Author: Ted Lewis
- Language: English
- Genre: Thriller, Crime novel
- Publisher: Michael Joseph
- Publication date: 9 February 1970
- Publication place: United Kingdom
- Media type: Print (Hardback & Paperback)
- Pages: 224 pp
- ISBN: 0-7181-0730-6 (hardback edition) & ISBN 0-948164-06-9 (paperback edition)
- OCLC: 82810
- Dewey Decimal: 823/.9/14
- LC Class: PZ4.L676 Jac PR6062.E955
- Followed by: Jack Carter's Law

Jack's Return Home is a 1970 novel by British writer Ted Lewis. It was adapted into the 1971 film Get Carter, starring Michael Caine as Jack Carter. The novel portrays a subsection of society living on the borderline between crime and respectability. The book was a major influence on the noir school of English crime fiction.

The novel was republished in 1971 by Pan in paperback as a film tie-in under the title Carter, featuring stills from the movie Get Carter on the cover. The novel went out of print for many years and slipped into obscurity, until – in the 1990s – there was a resurgence in the popularity of the film, which in turn generated fresh interest in the book. The book was republished in paperback under the title Get Carter by Allison & Busby in 1993.

In 2012, the novel was adapted as a radio serial by Nick Perry and broadcast under its original title on BBC Radio 4, starring Hugo Speer as Jack Carter.

In 2016, the playwright Torben Betts adapted the novel for a critically acclaimed production by Newcastle's Northern Stage.

== Plot summary ==
Jack's Return Home tells the story of Jack Carter, an amoral, pitiless London mob enforcer who returns to his hometown to investigate the mysterious death of his brother, with whom he had not spoken in many years. Jack's presence in the town causes unease among the local crime families, who fear that his snooping will interfere with their underworld operations. Everything from simple suggestion to brute force is employed to try to get him to leave, but he doggedly refuses, bullying his way through numerous attempts on his life to arrive at the truth, leading to a violent and ambiguous conclusion which takes place in a derelict brickworks on the shoreline of the Humber.

== Film adaptations ==
The novel has so far been filmed three times, as Get Carter in 1971 and the 2000 remake, and as Hit Man in 1972.

== Further Carter novels ==
Jack Carter was featured in two prequel novels, both written by Lewis.

- Jack Carter's Law (1974)
- Jack Carter and the Mafia Pigeon (1976)

== Trivia ==
The first printing of the paperback which tied in with the film version was published under the title Carter (Pan Books 1971, ISBN 0-330-02620-8). All references on the cover of the book also refer to the film under this title.

The character of Jack Carter, though not fully named for copyright reasons, plays a key role in the Alan Moore and Kevin O'Neill graphic novel League of Extraordinary Gentlemen Century: 1969. The story takes place during 1969, shortly before Jack's visit "up north" and the events of Jack's Return Home.
