= Morton Tubor =

American film editor and sound editor (1917–2019)

- Born: April 29, 1917; Chicago, Illinois, U.S.
- Died: August 22, 2019 (aged 102); Los Angeles, California, U.S.
- Occupations: Film and sound editor

Morton H. Tubor (April 29, 1917 – August 22, 2019) was an American film editor and sound editor. In both capacities, he worked mostly in low budget horror and exploitation films.

As a film editor, he worked on Francis Ford Coppola's Dementia 13 (1963), Jack Hill's Switchblade Sisters (1975), and Paul Bartel's Cannonball (1976), among other films. He also edited Samuel Fuller's relatively big budget The Big Red One (1980).

As a sound editor, many of his credits were for television documentaries, including several National Geographic and Time-Life specials. He was the sound editor for Peter Bogdanovich's Nickelodeon (1976).
