= The Slams =

1973 film by Jonathan Kaplan

- Film poster by John Solie
- Directed by: Jonathan Kaplan
- Written by: Richard DeLong Adams
- Produced by: Gene Corman
- Starring: Jim Brown
- Cinematography: Andrew Davis
- Edited by: Morton Tubor
- Music by: Luther Henderson
- Production company: Penelope Productions
- Distributed by: Metro-Goldwyn-Mayer
- Release date: September 26, 1973
- Running time: 91 minutes
- Country: United States
- Language: English

The Slams is a 1973 American action film directed by Jonathan Kaplan and starring Jim Brown.

== Plot ==
Curtis Hook (Jim Brown) is caught by the police after a heist. In jail, Curtis has to deal with people who want to know where he stashed the loot while also trying to get out of jail in time to get the money before its hiding place is demolished.

== Cast ==
- Jim Brown as Curtis X. Hook
- Judy Pace as Iris Daniels
- Roland Bob Harris as Captain Stambell (credited as Roland 'Bob' Harris)
- Paul Harris as Jackson Barney (credited as Paul E. Harris)
- Frank DeKova as Capiello
- Ted Cassidy as Glover
- Frenchia Guizon as Macey
- John Dennis as Sergeant Morella / Flood
- Jac Emel as Zack
- Quinn K. Redeker as The Warden (credited as Quinn Redeker)

== Production ==
The film was produced by Gene Corman, brother of famous B-movie producer Roger Corman. Gene hired Kaplan on the basis of the director's handling of the black subplot in Roger Corman's The Student Teachers. The only requirement was that Kaplan meet with Jim Brown. "I found him to be quite sweet, quite charming," says Kaplan.

Kaplan found Gene Corman a far more hands on producer than his brother, casting the movie and using his own editor. The film was shot on location mostly at Lincoln Heights Prison in Los Angeles.

Brown wanted to fight someone bigger than him in a fight scene so Ted Cassidy was cast. Kaplan said he found the way to keep Brown engaged in the movie was to get him involved in some sort of competition, so he organised people to play chess with him in between takes.

"We got along because I treated him like an actor, not like an ex-football player," said Kaplan.

== Reception ==
Dennis Schwartz gave it a C+ and said the film "Aims to prove that blacks like whites can also play amoral criminal hero roles with a straight face and a smirk." Critic Mike McGranaghan gave it 3 out of 4 and wrote: "It's everything you could ever want from a Jim Brown prison movie."
