= Petey Wheatstraw (film) =

- Theatrical release poster
- Directed by: Cliff Roquemore
- Written by: Cliff Roquemore
- Produced by: Burt Steiger; Theodore Toney
- Starring: Rudy Ray Moore; Jimmy Lynch; Leroy Daniels; G. Tito Shaw; Ernest Mayhand
- Release date: November 1977 (North America)
- Running time: 100 minutes
- Country: United States
- Language: English

Petey Wheatstraw (also known as Petey Wheatstraw, the Devil's Son-in-Law) is a 1977 American blaxploitation comedy film written and directed by Cliff Roquemore, and starring comedian Rudy Ray Moore alongside Jimmy Lynch, Leroy Daniels, Ernest Mayhand, Ebony Wright, and Wildman Steve Gallon. It is typical of Moore's other films from the same era, such as Dolemite and The Human Tornado.

In the film, a successful nightclub comedian is murdered by jealous rivals. He is resurrected through a deal with the Devil, having agreed to marry the Devil's daughter. He gains magical powers through a cane granted to him and uses them to seek revenge.

== Plot ==
Petey Wheatstraw (Rudy Ray Moore) is born during a great Miami hurricane, and after a difficult labor by his mother, emerges as a talking, diaper-wearing, six-year-old boy who promptly attacks the doctor and then his father. His mother stops him, puts him in his place, and names him "Petey Wheatstraw".

While a young teenager, after being beaten up by a gang, Petey meets a mentor named "Bantu" who teaches him the philosophy of "Kung Fu" and "self-respect", taking a vow not to bow before any man, living or dead. Petey grows up to become a successful nightclub comedian, who books a series of shows at a club in Los Angeles called "Steve's Den" - much to the dismay of comedy rivals Leroy and Skillet, who have just borrowed a large sum of money from the Mob to finance their own opening at another club the following day. Realizing that their show is likely to fail with Petey in town (and therefore default on the loan, and putting their lives at risk), they beg Petey to delay his act. When Petey refuses to do so, Leroy and Skillet's henchmen kill Petey's business partner Ted's little brother Larry. The henchmen then shoot up Larry's funeral, killing Petey and several others.

Petey is visited by "Lou Cipher" - the Devil himself - who tells him that his death was a mistake. He is willing to undo Petey's death on one condition: that Petey marry the Devil's daughter and provide him with a grandson. Petey nearly quashes the deal when he sees the picture of the Devil's ugly daughter, but hears the words of Bantu and decides to make a deal. Petey and his friends are resurrected, and Petey tells them of the Devil's deal and his plans to gain revenge on Leroy and Skillet, as well as trick the Devil by not marrying his daughter.

Armed with the Devil's own magic "Pimp Cane", Petey sets out to exact his revenge. He uses the cane's magic to do good in his community while also humiliating his rivals. However, demons begin appearing in Petey and his friends's lives as a reminder of the deal he made. Petey is able to outsmart them, going as far as to have sex with a room full of demon women with such stamina that they all fall unconscious.

After finally getting even with Leroy and Skillet by having them killed by the mob, Petey confronts the Devil with his own cane and sets him on fire, casting him off a roof to his apparent death. He breaks the cane in half and gets into a car with his friends, sure that their ordeal is over. However, an undead Leroy and Skillet - as well as the Devil - appear in the car to taunt Petey, and the film ends as Petey screams in terror.

== Cast ==
- Rudy Ray Moore as Petey Wheatstraw
  - Danny Poinson as Young Petey Wheatstraw
  - Clifford Roquemore II as Baby Petey Wheatstraw
- Jimmy Lynch as Jimmy
- Leroy Daniels as Leroy
- Ernest Mayhand as "Skillet"
- Ebony Wright as Nell, Petey's Girlfriend / Pet, The Devil's Daughter
- Wildman Steve as Steve
- G. Tito Shaw as Lucifer / The Devil
- Ted Clemmons as Ted
- Marvin Jones as Willie "Scarface Willie"
- George Mireless as Mr. White
- Bryan L. Roquemore as Larry
- Brian Breye as Bantu
- Rose Jewel Williams as Petey's Mother
- Sy Richardson as Petey's Father

== Home media ==
Petey Wheatstraw was released on DVD in 2002 as part of the Dolemite Collection box set. In July 2016, the film was restored in 2K and released on DVD and Blu-ray by Vinegar Syndrome.
