= The Front Page (1974 film) =

1974 film by Billy Wilder

- Theatrical release poster
- Directed by: Billy Wilder
- Screenplay by: I. A. L. Diamond; Billy Wilder
- Based on: The Front Page; 1928 play by Ben Hecht; Charles MacArthur
- Produced by: Paul Monash
- Starring: Jack Lemmon; Walter Matthau; Vincent Gardenia; Susan Sarandon; Allen Garfield; David Wayne; Charles Durning; Austin Pendleton; Carol Burnett
- Cinematography: Jordan Cronenweth
- Edited by: Ralph E. Winters
- Music by: Billy May
- Color process: Technicolor
- Production company: Universal Pictures
- Distributed by: Universal Pictures
- Release date: December 18, 1974
- Running time: 105 minutes
- Country: United States
- Language: English
- Budget: $4 million
- Box office: $15 million

The Front Page is a 1974 American black comedy-drama film directed by Billy Wilder, and starring Jack Lemmon and Walter Matthau. The screenplay by Wilder and I. A. L. Diamond is based on Ben Hecht and Charles MacArthur's 1928 play of the same name (which inspired several other films, such as 1931's The Front Page, the 1940 comedy His Girl Friday and televised movies and series episodes).

== Plot ==
In 1920s Chicago, Chicago Examiner reporter Hildebrand "Hildy" Johnson has just quit his job to marry Peggy Grant and start a new career as convict Earl Williams is set to be executed. Ruthless, egomaniacal managing editor Walter Burns, desperate to keep Hildy on the job, encourages him to cover the story, frustrating Peggy, who is eager to catch their train.

Earl is an impoverished, bumbling leftist whose offense was stuffing fortune cookies with messages, demanding the release from death row of equally overblown murder convicts Sacco and Vanzetti. After Williams accidentally kills a police officer, the yellow press has painted Earl as another communist threat from Moscow, so Chicago citizens are eager to see him put to death. Earl escapes from his prison cell, but enters the courthouse pressroom while Hildy is there alone. Hildy cannot resist the lure of what could be the biggest scoop of what remains of his career. When Earl is in danger of being discovered, Mollie Malloy, a self-described "$2 whore from Division Street" who befriended Earl, creates a distraction by leaping from the third-floor window.

When Earl is caught, Hildy and Walter are arrested for aiding and abetting a fugitive, but are released when they discover that the mayor and sheriff colluded to conceal Earl's last-minute reprieve by the governor. Walter grudgingly accepts that he is losing his ace reporter, and presents him with a watch as a token of his appreciation. Hildy and Peggy leave to get married, and Walter telegraphs the next railway station to alert them that the man who stole his watch is on the inbound train, and should be apprehended by the police.

== Cast ==
- Jack Lemmon as Hildebrand 'Hildy' Johnson
- Walter Matthau as Walter Burns
- Susan Sarandon as Peggy Grant
- Vincent Gardenia as Sheriff "Honest Pete" Hartman
- David Wayne as Roy Bensinger
- Allen Garfield as Kruger
- Charles Durning as Murphy
- Herb Edelman as Schwartz
- Austin Pendleton as Earl Williams
- Carol Burnett as Mollie Malloy
- Martin Gabel as Dr. Max J. Eggelhofer
- Harold Gould as The Mayor
- John Furlong as Duffy
- Jon Korkes as Rudy Keppler
- Cliff Osmond as Officer Jacobi
- Paul Benedict as Plunkett, governor's man
- Lou Frizzell as Endicott
- Dick O'Neill as McHugh
- Noam Pitlik as Wilson
- Doro Merande as Jennie, cleaning woman
- Biff Elliot as Police Dispatcher
- Barbara Davis as Myrtle

Allen Jenkins, who had appeared in the 1928 original production, plays a small role as a telegrapher. It was his final film role; he died in July 1974.

== Production ==
The original play had been adapted for the screen in 1931, and as His Girl Friday in 1940 (and would be remade again with 1987's Switching Channels). Billy Wilder was quoted by his biographer, Charlotte Chandler, as saying, "I'm against remakes in general ... because if a picture is good, you shouldn't remake it, and if it's lousy, why remake it? ... It was not one of my pictures I was particularly proud of."

After years of producing his films, Wilder passed producing chores to Paul Monash, and concentrated on screenwriting and directing, when Jennings Lang suggested that he film a new adaptation of The Front Page for Universal Pictures. The idea appealed to Wilder, a newspaperman in his younger days, who recalled, "A reporter was a glamorous fellow in those days, the way he wore a hat, and a raincoat, and a swagger, and had his camaraderie with fellow reporters, with local police, always hot on the tail of tips from them and from the fringes of the underworld." Although the two earlier screen adaptations of the play were set in their contemporary times, Wilder decided that his would be a period piece set in 1929, primarily because the daily newspaper was no longer the dominant news medium in 1974.

Wilder hired Henry Bumstead as production designer. For exterior shots, Bumstead suggested that Wilder film in San Francisco, where the buildings were a better match than Los Angeles for 1920s Chicago. The final scene on the train was filmed in San Francisco, where a railroad enthusiast provided a vintage railway car for the setting. The interior shot of the theater in an earlier scene was done at the Orpheum Theatre in Los Angeles. The opening credits scenes were filmed at the Los Angeles Herald Examiner.

Wilder and Diamond insisted that their dialogue be delivered exactly as written, and clearly enough to be understood easily. Jack Lemmon, who portrayed Hildy Johnson, later said, "I had one regret about the film. Billy would not let us overlap our lines more. I think that would have made it better ... I feel it's a piece in which you must overlap. But Billy, the writer, wanted to hear all of the words clearly, and he wanted the audience to hear the words. I would have liked to overlap to the point where you lost some of the dialogue."

Two characters not in the play were added to the film. Dr. Eggelhofer, a character only mentioned in the play, appears in the film as an eccentric, sex-obsessed Freudian psychiatrist whose theories are utterly incomprehensible to Williams. The other added character is Rudy Keppler, a young reporter who is seduced in the bathroom by the older reporter, Roy Bensinger. In the play, the character of Bensinger was portrayed as effeminate and rather high-strung, suggesting that he is gay, but in the film, he is portrayed as a stereotypical campy homosexual whose effeminacy and mincing manners leave no doubt about his sexuality, even if he is not explicitly described as gay. Diamond and Wilder also inserted several "in jokes" to the film, such as describing Burns as still being upset with the loss of his star reporter, Ben Hecht (who did work as a newsman in 1920s Chicago), to a Hollywood studio.

Because of Wilder's tendency to "cut in the camera", a form of spontaneous editing that results in a minimal footage being shot, editor Ralph E. Winters was able to assemble a rough cut of the film four days after principal photography was completed.

The film was Wilder's first to show a financial return since The Fortune Cookie, and his last box-office hit of any significance. The director regretted not sticking to his instincts over remakes.

== Reception ==
=== Box office ===
The film earned North American theatrical rentals of $7,460,000.

=== Critical response ===
On the review aggregator website Rotten Tomatoes, 58% of 31 critics' reviews are positive, with an average rating of 6/10. Metacritic, which uses a weighted average, assigned the film a score of 63 out of 100, based on eight critics, indicating "generally favorable" reviews.

Vincent Canby of The New York Times thought the story was "a natural" for Wilder and Diamond, who "have a special (and, to my mind, very appealing) appreciation for vulgar, brilliant con artists of monumental tackiness". He continued, "Even though the mechanics and demands of movie-making slow what should be the furious tempo, this Front Page displays a giddy bitterness that is rare in any films except those of Mr. Wilder. It is also, much of the time, extremely funny." He described Walter Matthau and Austin Pendleton as "marvelous", and added, "Mr. Lemmon is comparatively reserved as the flamboyant Hildy, never quite letting go of his familiar comic personality to become dominated by the lunacies of the farce. He always remains a little outside it, acting. Carol Burnett has an even tougher time as Molly Malloy... This role may well be impossible, however, since it requires the actress to play for straight melodrama while everyone around her is going for laughs... Mr. Wilder has great fun with the period newspaper detail... and admires his various supporting actors to such an extent that he allows them to play as broadly as they could possibly desire." He concluded, "The hysteria is not as consistent as one might wish, nor, indeed, as epic as in Mr. Wilder's own One, Two, Three. The cohesive force is, instead, the director's fondness for frauds, which, I suspect, is really an admiration for people who barrel on through life completely intimidating those who should know better."

The British television network, Channel 4, called it the "least satisfying screen adaptation of Hecht and MacArthur's play", saying it "adds little to the mix other than a bit of choice language. The direction is depressingly flat and stagy, Wilder running on empty. While it is easy to see why he was attracted to this material... he just does not seem to have the energy here to do it justice. Matthau and Lemmon put in their usual faultless turns, but cannot lift a pervading air of pointlessness."

TV Guide rated the film 2½ stars out of four, and noted, "This slick remake of the ebullient original falls short of being the film it could have been, despite the presence of master filmmaker Wilder and his engaging costars... Despite the obvious charismatic interaction between Lemmon and Matthau, the film is oddly stilted. In an overly emphatic turn, the miscast Burnett easily gives the most awful performance of her career. She projects only one emotion — a gratingly annoying hysteria. One never enjoys the film so much as when her character throws herself out of a window."

Burnett said in her 2010 memoir This Time Together that she was so displeased with her performance, that when she was on an airplane in which the film was shown, she apologized on the plane's intercom.

=== Awards ===
The film was nominated for the Golden Globe Award for Best Motion Picture – Musical or Comedy, but lost to The Longest Yard. Lemmon and Matthau, competing with each other for the Golden Globe Award for Best Actor – Motion Picture Musical or Comedy, lost to Art Carney in Harry and Tonto.

Wilder and Diamond were nominated for the Writers Guild of America Award for Best Comedy Adapted from Another Medium, but lost to Lionel Chetwynd and Mordecai Richler for The Apprenticeship of Duddy Kravitz.

Wilder won the David di Donatello Award for Best Director of a Foreign Film, and Lemmon and Matthau shared Best Foreign Actor honors with Burt Lancaster for Conversation Piece.

== Home media ==
GoodTimes Entertainment released the film on a Region 1 DVD June 17, 1998. It is in a fullscreen format, with an audio track in English, and subtitles in English, Spanish and French. On May 31, 2005, it was rereleased in a widescreen edition DVD by Universal Home Video. Kino Lorber released the film on Blu-ray August 6, 2019.

== In popular culture ==
In the 2019 Rudy Ray Moore biopic, Dolemite Is My Name, Moore (portrayed by Eddie Murphy) goes to a screening of The Front Page with friends, and finds the film unfunny, and is confused by the riotous reaction by the audience in the theater. Moore is inspired by this experience to make his own film, which eventually became Dolemite (1975).

== See also ==
- List of American films of 1974
