= Wildman Steve =

- Born: Steve Gallon, Jr. September 10, 1925; Monticello, Florida, U.S.
- Died: September 1, 2004 (aged 78); Miami, Florida, U.S.
- Occupation(s): Comedian, radio personality, promoter, MC
- Years active: Mid-1950s–2004

Steve Gallon Jr. (September 10, 1925 – September 1, 2004), known as Wildman Steve (or Wild Man Steve), was an American comic entertainer, radio personality, promoter, MC and recording artist.

== Biography ==
He was born in Monticello, Florida, but in the late 1930s moved with his parents to Waterbury, Connecticut, where he attended school. He served in the US Navy in Korea, and became a Golden Gloves boxing champion, before returning to Waterbury to set up a salon and nightclub. He became involved in local radio in Waterbury, and then in Hartford, Bridgeport and Providence, before joining station WILD in Boston, Massachusetts, in about 1958. There, he acquired his sobriquet, "Wildman Steve". Besides his radio appearances, he started performing in local clubs alongside comedians such as Flip Wilson, Redd Foxx, and Pigmeat Markham, who encouraged his move into full-time work as an entertainer.

In 1963, he moved to Miami, Florida, to work at radio station WMBM. He became one of the most popular radio personalities in the region, working alongside Milton "Butterball" Smith and King Coleman. He also established a reputation as a promoter and master of ceremonies, bringing to Miami top entertainers such as James Brown, Jerry Butler, and Harold Melvin and the Blue Notes. He recorded several albums with other comedians, before striking out on his own with the 1969 comedy albums Shacking Up and My Man! Wild Man!. The latter was reportedly the first party album by a black comedian to reach the album charts of both Cash Box and Billboard, staying in the top 50 for 26 weeks. Its success led Gallon to record a series of further party albums, noted for their risqué and explicit content, through to the early 1990s.

He also appeared in several movies, including Ain't That Just Like a Honkey! (1976), Petey Wheatstraw, and The Guy from Harlem (both 1977). The only film in which he had a starring role was the controversially-titled The Six Thousand Dollar Nigger, also known as Super Soul Brother, directed by Rene Martinez Jr., in 1978, in which he played a homeless drunk injected by a mad scientist with a serum that gives him enhanced powers. One reviewer refers to Gallon's "frenetic physical comedy and shameless stereotype baiting". He toured in the Caribbean and Bermuda with his Wildman Steve Revue, and promoted worldwide tours by comedians and musicians including Rudy Ray Moore (who directed and starred in Petey Wheatstraw), Millie Jackson, and LaWanda Page.

In later years, he contributed to charitable activities in Miami, particularly working with unemployed people. In 2002, the City of Miami gave him the Cultural Ambassador's Award, for his services to the entertainment industry and its promotion around the world. He died in Miami in 2004 at the age of 78.

== Discography ==
- Shacking Up (1969)
- My Man! Wild Man! (1969)
- Wild! Wild! Wild! Wild! (1970)
- King Of Them All (1971)
- Eatin' Ain't Cheatin!!! (1973)
- Do Not Disturb (1973)
- When You're Hot – You're Hot!!! (1976)
- The Six Thousand Dollar Nigger (1978)
- Midnight Snack (1978)
- Is It Good Baby (1980)
- Did He Really Say That (1980)
- Everybody's Man (1983)
- For Ladies Only (1988)
- Fake It Till You Make It (1990)
- Love To Make A' Ugly M.F. Laff (1993)
