= The Legend of Dolemite =

- Directed by: Foster V. Corder; Ross Guidici
- Written by: Duane LaDage; Rudy Ray Moore; S. Leigh Savidge
- Based on: Dolemite by Rudy Ray Moore
- Produced by: Rudy Ray Moore
- Starring: Rudy Ray Moore; Eddie Griffin; Paul Mooney; John Landis; Ice-T; Snoop Dogg; Eazy-E; Mike D Lady Reed; LaWanda Page
- Release date: 1994
- Country: United States
- Language: English

The Legend of Dolemite is an American 1994 short film directed by Foster V. Corder about the blaxploitation film character Dolemite created by actor Rudy Ray Moore.

The original short film was later expanded into a 2003 feature-length documentary, The Legend of Dolemite: Bigger & Badder, directed by Ross Guidici.

== Critical reception ==
Variety said "The 1970s blaxploitation cult figure Rudy Ray Moore gets a suitably affectionate if uninspired tribute in Ross Guidici's "The Legend of Dolemite." Pic updates and uses footage from a 1994 docu of the same title. Skedded for VHS/DVD release this spring, featurette is a decent introduction to an exuberant personality.

The A.V. Club wrote "The Legend Of Dolemite: Bigger And Badder offers a standard-issue look at Moore's life and times."
