= Spliff (disambiguation) =

Spliff may refer to:

- A joint (cannabis), one of numerous slang terms for a cigarette made from cannabis; it may also refer to one of the following derivative names:
  - Spliff (band), a German 80s new wave band;
  - Jimmy Spliff, another name for punk singer Jimmy Gestapo;
  - Sam the Spliff, a character in the martial arts film Shaolin Dolemite;
  - a song by Austrian band Bilderbuch.
