= Leroy Daniels =

American musician and comedian (1928–1993)

Leroy Daniels (November 28, 1928 – December 11, 1993) was an American actor and singer, originally a shoeshine man who sang and danced as he worked, and whose act led to an appearance with Fred Astaire in the 1953 musical The Band Wagon. It was the only time that Astaire danced on-screen with a black dancer. Daniels' act also served as inspiration for the choreography of the scene in the film.

His performances became the inspiration for the song, Chattanooga Shoeshine Boy, which in 1950 became a #1 hit for Country music singer Red Foley.

Daniels subsequently made other screen appearances, including Handle With Care (1964), Petey Wheatstraw (1977), Disco Godfather (1979), and Avenging Angel (1985). He also appeared in the TV series Sanford and Son.

He was part of the comedy duo Leroy & Skillet with Ernest Mayhand, who appeared with him on Sanford and Son. The duo recorded several albums such as The Okra Eaters for Laff Records in the 1970s, notable for their explicit, raunchy comedy. A solo comedy album by Daniels was also released, entitled "Sexmouth". Daniels died on December 11, 1993.
