= Cliff Roquemore =

American writer

- Born: 28 September 1948; Detroit, Michigan, United States
- Died: 5 February 2002 (aged 53); Tulsa, Oklahoma, United States
- Education: Wayne State University
- Occupations: playwright, screenwriter, theatrical producer, theatrical director, film director
- Years active: 1973–1990s
- Known for: Work with Rudy Ray Moore

Cliff Roquemore (28 September 1948 – 5 February 2002) was an American writer, producer and director. Principally active in Detroit theater, he was also involved with the production of several blaxploitation films, including The Human Tornado (1976), Petey Wheatstraw (1978) and Disco Godfather (1979).

Roquemore also wrote the musical, The Gospel Truth, which toured nationally, winning NAACP Image Awards. He also directed Eartha Kitt's one-woman show in 1990. He died of cancer in 2002.

== Personal life ==
Roquemore was the father of actress Xosha Roquemore.
