= Murder of Dylan Groves =

2019 murder of Ohio infant

- Dylan James Groves
- Location: Otway, Ohio, U.S.
- Date: 2019
- Deaths: 1
- Victim: Dylan James Groves
- Perpetrators: Jessica Groves and Daniel Groves
- Convictions: Jessica Groves: guilty on all 11 counts Daniel Groves: not guilty on aggravated murder, guilty for remaining ten counts.

On June 12, 2019, the body of two-month-old Dylan Groves was found in a 30-foot-deep well in Otway, Ohio, United States. His parents, Daniel and Jessica Groves were arrested two days prior on June 10, 2019, after failing to make in-person contact with Scioto County Children's Services for two months, resulting in a missing person's report being filed for Dylan.

Dylan was found in a container consisting of two plastic milk crates chained together open end to open end, and secured with a chain, padlocks, and zip ties. The milk crates contained multiple large stones, a metal anchor, and Dylan's decomposed body, which was wrapped in two blankets and multiple layers of plastic, and secured with duct tape. Dylan had multiple fractures to his arm, legs, skull, and ribs which occurred at different periods of time, evident from their stages of healing. He also had methamphetamine and amphetamine in his system. His cause of death was listed as “homicidal violence of undetermined etiology.”

Daniel and Jessica Groves were charged with his murder, as well as kidnapping, interference with custody, abuse of a corpse, among other charges. Both of them were convicted and sentenced on January 10, 2020, which would have been Dylan's first birthday.

In August 2021, Ohio State Senator Terry Johnson introduced Senate Bill 216, also known as Dylan's Law, which if passed, would have required the parents of children addicted to drugs to go through extensive training and milestones before they can be reunited with their children. The bill died while in committee.

== Background ==
Jessica and Daniel Groves, of Otway, Ohio, before January 10, 2019, had 2 children, Daniel Groves Junior and Dylan James Groves. Dylan was born on January 10, 2019. The Groves arrived at the Southern Ohio Medical Center in Portsmouth, Ohio, early that morning. Jessica was dilated 9½ out of 10 centimeters. Hospital staff noticed Jessica was under the influence but she refused to answer their questions. Staff in the maternity ward administered no pain medications to Jessica because she was under the influence as well as there were no records of prenatal care for Dylan. He was delivered within 30 minutes, and was promptly placed on oxygen, as he was born prematurely. Neither Daniel nor Jessica accompanied him there.

Dylan and Jessica both tested positive for drugs, and Dylan began exhibiting symptoms of neonatal withdrawal syndrome 12 hours after his birth. His umbilical cord was tested shortly before his birth, and tested positive for various drugs including methamphetamine, amphetamine, fentanyl, and morphine, among other drugs.

Scioto County Children's Services intended to award custody of Dylan to his father, Daniel, as they believed Daniel was employed with Rural King, a farm supply store, and would be able to provide clean drug tests. They intended to release Dylan to Daniel under the pretenses Jessica would not live in the same home and had to attend drug treatment. The hospital would not agree to release Dylan to the Groves under those pretenses and, instead, Dylan was placed with a foster mother, Andrea Tackett, on January 16. Dylan was still exhibiting symptoms of drug withdrawal, such as twitching and tremors, and wanted to be held at all times.

Dylan remained with Tackett for ten days, before he was placed back into the custody of Daniel under the previously discussed pretenses. Jessica was assessed by a local drug treatment facility, where she received treatment for three weeks. Dylan regularly saw a pediatrician for less than one month. The Groves eventually began avoiding contact with Children's Services, who tried reaching out to them between February 4 and February 25, including visiting their older son at his school. Children's Services made successful contact with them again on the 25th.

After February 25, the Groves avoided contact with Children's Services. Caseworker Patricia Craft, made contact with the family at their home on March 28, which was the last documented sighting of Dylan alive. After that visit, the Groves would not make in-person contact with Children's Services again. Children's Services attempted to make in-person contact several times throughout the following months, to no avail. Children's Services eventually placed their older son, Daniel Junior, with an aunt and uncle.

Children's Services filed a missing person's report for Dylan on April 30, and continued to make unsuccessful attempts at contacting the family. Deputies from the Scioto County Sheriff's Office also attempted to make contact. On one occasion, on May 20, Captain John Murphy observed the Groves on a four-wheeler near their home and attempted to stop them, but they took off into the woods. A search warrant was secured for their home on June 10. Jessica Groves was promptly arrested and brought down to the Scioto County Sheriff's Office. Daniel was arrested after an hours-long standoff involving a robot and was also transported to the sheriff's department.

== Recovery of Dylan's body ==
Jessica and Daniel were interviewed by Scioto County Detective Jodi Conkel on June 11. They both initially told Detective Conkel that Children's Services had already taken Dylan along with their older son, Daniel Junior. Daniel was reported as being dopesick during his interview, and was rolling around on the floor, but admitted to Detective Conkel that Dylan was deceased, recounting how he found Dylan in his crib dead. He took Detective Conkel to where he initially said Dylan's body was, and nothing was found. The following day, Detective Conkel placed Daniel and Jessica in an interrogation room together, where the two began whispering together. Daniel says to Jessica, “If they find his body and if they find out where he had a broken arm and shit, we're fucked. It don't matter.”

After removing Jessica and confronting Daniel, Detective Conkel convinced Daniel to take them to the correct spot Dylan was placed. Daniel led Detective Conkel and sheriff's deputies to a well in the middle of a field near their home. Members of the Otway Volunteer Fire Department assisted in recovering Dylan's body, which was pulled from the well after four hours. Dylan's body was contained within two plastic milk crates which were held together by their open ends, and secured with a chain woven in through their handles, along with three padlocks, 12 zip ties, and eight wire ties. Inside the two milk crates were 18 large rocks, and what was described by the medical examiner who performed the autopsy as an “iron anchor-type device.” Dylan's body was wrapped in two blankets, numerous layers of plastic, and duct tape. He was wearing a onesie, socks, and a diaper when he was recovered.

Dylan suffered two skull fractures that didn't occur at the same time – as they were in different stages of healing, two fractures of his left radius and ulna, a fracture of his left tibia, and healing fractures to his ribs, which also occurred at different points in time. He had bruises on his chest and left leg, as well as decomposition changes on his abdomen. His organs were all decomposed. When examined, his brain was a pink color, as opposed to a tan color, which indicated a presence of blood, possibly bleeding of the brain.

Dylan's cause of death was listed as “homicidal violence of undetermined etiology” by medical examiner Dr. Susan Brown, who performed the autopsy. She stated during the Groves’ trial that while all of the injuries he sustained indicated he died of homicide, and despite him suffering obvious and significant blunt-force trauma, the specific cause of death could not be determined as his body was too gravely decomposed to do so, but she believed the fractures showed three different instances of trauma based on their signs of healing.

A vigil was held for Dylan on June 13. In October, Lorra Fuller, the executive director of Scioto County Children's Services at the time, was placed on administrative leave.

== Trial ==
Daniel and Jessica Groves were charged with 11 felonies: aggravated murder, murder, kidnapping, endangering children, tampering with evidence, gross abuse of a corpse, and four counts of felonious assault. They pleaded not guilty to all of them, and the judge revoked their bond.

At their trial, which began on January 7, 2020, Jessica and Daniel's defense attorneys conceded that Jessica was the principal perpetrator in their son's death, and that Daniel had nothing to do with the death of Dylan apart from helping Jessica hide his body.

Among the witnesses at their trial were maternity nurses, pediatricians, Andrea Bowling – Dylan's foster mother - and law enforcement officials, including Detective Conkel. Caseworker Patricia Craft, who was assigned to the Groves’ case, testified about numerous occasions she attempted to make contact with the Groves. She testified that while Dylan was missing after the Groves’ last visit, she suggested putting out an amber alert for him but was denied by supervisors, who said that “if an amber alert went out, it would give a bad representation for the agency because they lost a child".

Daniel and Jessica's older son, Daniel Groves Junior, also testified. He stated that there were moments where his father would have him provide urine, which the prosecution argued was the reason he passed his drug tests. He also testified that he saw his brother, Dylan, with bruising and swelling to his head, and didn't see him in the following weeks.

On the fourth and final day of their trial, both Jessica and Daniel took the stand. Jessica took the stand first, and was questioned first by her attorney. She admitted to causing the death of Dylan, stating Daniel had nothing to do with the death of Dylan. She was cross-examined by prosecutors, and when asked how she killed her son, gave no direct answer, instead stating it was an accident and she dropped him.

Daniel took the stand next, and during his direct examination, he testified that he didn't know Jessica was using drugs until just before Dylan's birth. He testified that on March 28, shortly after the caseworker left their home, he found Dylan dead in his crib. He stated he fell back into drug use after their older son was taken by Children's Services. During cross-examination, prosecutors referenced statements he gave to investigators about seeing his wife strike Dylan in the head four times and grab him aggressively by the ribs. Daniel claimed during his cross-examination he thought that was a dream.

During closing arguments, the prosecution argued that Daniel should be found guilty of the same crimes as Jessica for not seeking help after seeing her strike and grab Dylan.

After two hours of deliberation, the jury found Jessica guilty on all counts, and Daniel guilty on every count except for aggravated murder. Judge Mark Kuhn sentenced Jessica to life without parole on the aggravated murder charge plus an additional 32 years for the other charges. Jessica is currently incarcerated at the Dayton Correctional Institution in Dayton, Ohio. Daniel was sentenced to a total of 47 years to life. Daniel is currently incarcerated at the Grafton Correctional Institution in Grafton, Ohio.

== Aftermath ==
Dylan's death would not be the only death of a child involving Scioto County Children's Services. In July 2020, Richard and Sonya Greene were charged with the murder of their 5-year-old granddaughter, Annabelle Greene. Annabelle and her two brothers, ages 7 and 3, were placed in Richard and Sonya's custody by Children's Services. Both grandparents pleaded guilty and were sentenced to life in prison without the possibility of parole.

In September 2021, two Scioto County Children's Services caseworkers, Lisa Thomas – who was involved in both the cases of Dylan Groves and Annabelle Greene, and Renee Ginn – who was involved in the case of Annabelle Greene, were indicted on charges of child endangerment.

In August 2021, Ohio State Senator Terry Johnson introduced Ohio Senate Bill 216, also known as Dylan's Law, a bill aimed to protect children born exposed to illegal drugs. The bill required parents of children born in such conditions to have to attend courses on treating drug-addicted children, as well as rehabilitation programs before reunification. After reunification, parents would be required to have regular contact with Children's Services caseworkers, and regularly be given drug and alcohol tests. The bill was sponsored by Republican State Senators Andrew Brenner and Jerry Cirino. The bill died in the Senate committee.
