= The Guy from Harlem =

- Theatrical release poster
- Directed by: Rene Martinez Jr.
- Written by: Gardenia Martinez
- Starring: Loye Hawkins
- Cinematography: Rafael Remy
- Music by: Cecil Graham
- Distributed by: International Cinema Inc.
- Release date: September 1977
- Running time: 86 minutes
- Country: United States
- Language: English

The Guy from Harlem (also known as The Good Guy from Harlem) is a 1977 American blaxploitation film directed by Rene Martinez Jr.

== Plot ==
Al Connors is a groovy, streetwise private investigator transplanted from Harlem to Miami, where he is highly acclaimed and sought out.

Agents of the CIA approach Al regarding a mission of international importance: an African head of state is in town for a conference, and the potentate's wife, Mrs. Ashanti, will need constant and reliable security. The CIA, fearful of a suspected intelligence leak, has concluded that Mrs. Ashanti is best entrusted to independent security rather than their own agents and has arranged for her to check in to a local hotel posing as Al's wife. Al takes the case and quickly develops a romantic attraction to Mrs. Ashanti. However, he immediately finds himself fending off spies who pose as hotel staff. After fighting with Ashanti's enemies, Al determines that they are working for a crime lord called Big Daddy, and he abandons the hotel room to relocate Mrs. Ashanti to the apartment of a female friend. Dismissing his friend, and confident they will not be found, Al has sex with Mrs. Ashanti.

After the CIA case is concluded, Al returns to his office and is presented with a new case. Crime boss Harry De Bauld's daughter Wanda has been kidnapped by the very same Big Daddy who threatened Mrs. Ashanti, and Harry is willing to pay Al handsomely for Wanda's safe return. Provided with cash and cocaine for a potential hostage exchange, Al delves deep into this case, investigating gyms, health clubs, and Miami's underworld for leads on where to find Big Daddy. Various leisure suit-wearing thugs direct Al to a shack on the city's outskirts, where he beats up and kills Big Daddy's men, rescues Wanda, and once again takes her to his female friend's apartment to have sex.

Wanda is reunited with her father, but Al is not satisfied; he wants to locate and defeat Big Daddy once and for all. Al arranges a meeting with Big Daddy, who challenges him to a fight to the death, on the condition that the loser's allies will not retaliate against the winner. Wanda shows up to cheer Al on, and after several minutes of grappling, Al kills Big Daddy. Al departs with Wanda as his men triumphantly high five.

== Cast ==
- Loye Hawkins as Al Connors
- Cathy Davis as Wanda De Bauld
- Patricia Fulton as Mrs. Ashanti
- Wanda Starr as Sue
- Steve Gallon as Harry De Bauld
- Laster Wilson as Larry De Bauld
- Wayne Crawford as "Big Daddy" (credited as Scott Lawrence)
- Vaughn Harris as CIA Agent David McLeod (credited as Vaughan Harris)
- Richie Vallon as Jim
- Michael Murrell as Paul Benson
- Angela Schon as Jo Ann
- Douglas Ferraro as Man #1
- Fernando Yi as Man #2
- Colleen Martinez as The Masseuse
- Hyatt Hodgdon as Mac
- Mickeal Taylor as Special Man
- Raff Prieto as The Waitress
- Lafon Hockaday as Health Spa Owner
- Patrick Hackett as Health Spa Extra
- Jesus Correa as Health Spa Extra
- Douglas Brinson as Bellboy

== Legacy ==
The Guy from Harlem was the subject of a 2012 episode of RiffTrax. They described the film thus: "It trades most of the sleaze, grime, and, well, exploitation that you expect from the genre for dopiness, sexual situations that fail to lead to actual sex, a clumsy confused sweetness, and more botched lines per minute than anything we've ever seen." Kevin Murphy described it as one of his five favorite "riffs".

Connect Savannah's Jim Reed described the film as "the most enjoyable so-bad-it's-good example of that genre I have ever come across. [...] it's jaw-droppingly inept yet still holds your attention. It's filled with clumsy fistfights, shoddy camerawork, D-grade funk music and polyester bell-bottomed leisure suits."
