= The Band Wagon =

1953 musical film by Vincente Minnelli

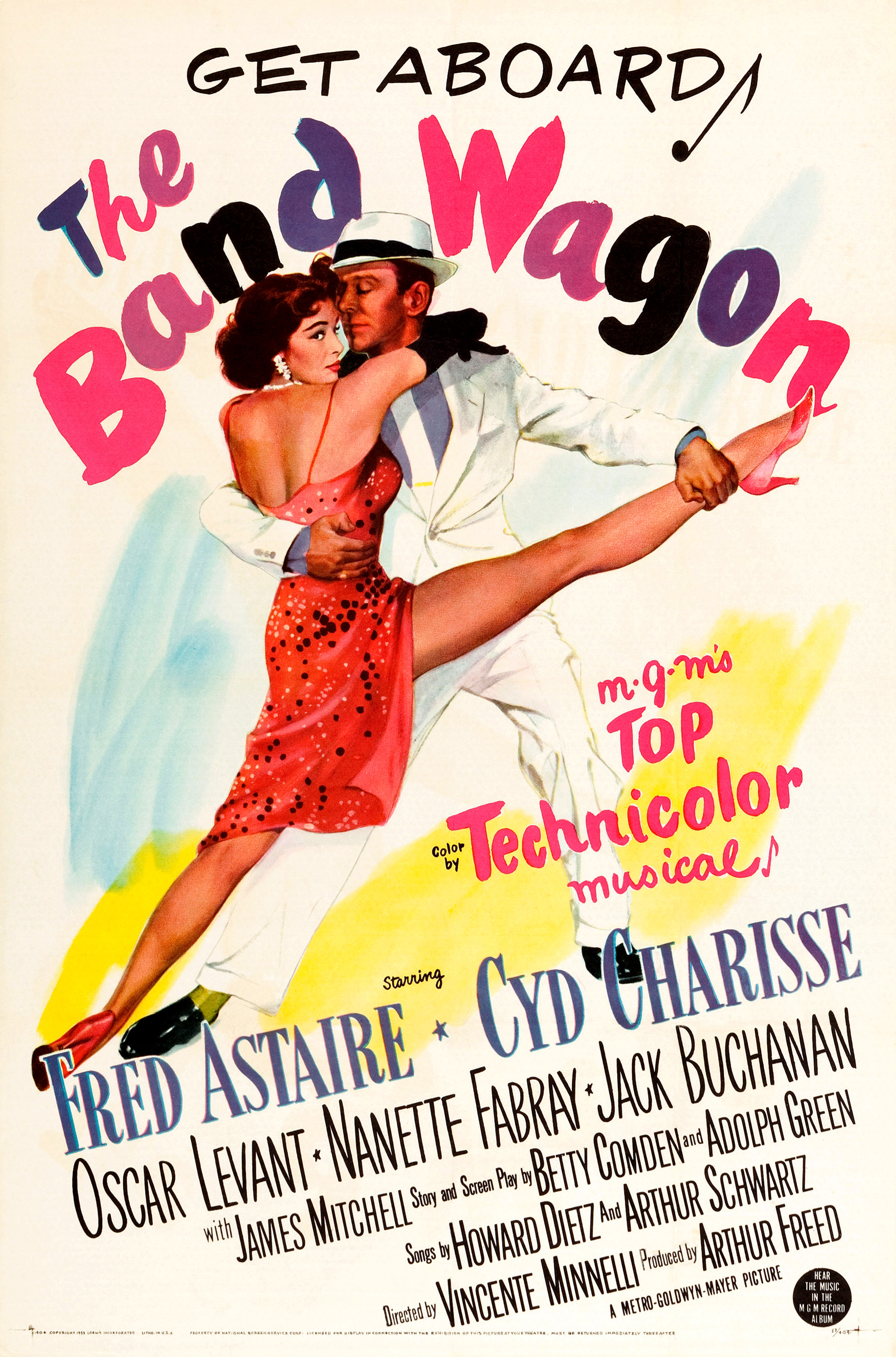
- Theatrical release poster
- Directed by: Vincente Minnelli
- Written by: Betty Comden; Adolph Green
- Produced by: Arthur Freed
- Starring: Fred Astaire; Cyd Charisse; Oscar Levant; Nanette Fabray; Jack Buchanan; James Mitchell
- Cinematography: Harry Jackson
- Edited by: Albert Akst
- Music by: Howard Dietz; Arthur Schwartz
- Color process: Technicolor
- Production company: Metro-Goldwyn-Mayer
- Distributed by: Loew's, Inc
- Release date: July 9, 1953 (New York City)
- Running time: 111 minutes
- Country: United States
- Language: English
- Budget: $2.9 million
- Box office: $3.5 million

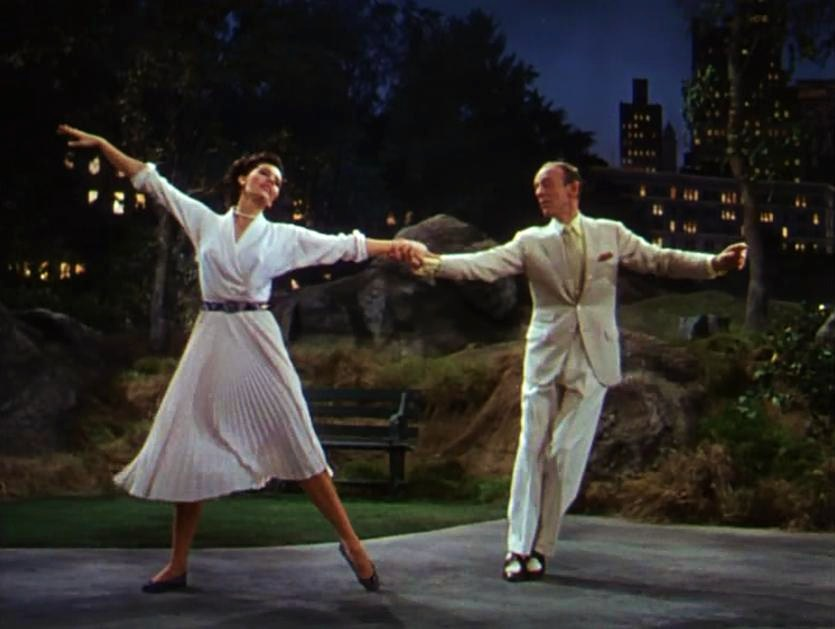
Cyd Charisse and Fred Astaire in one of the film's highlights, "Dancing in the Dark"

The Band Wagon is a 1953 American musical romantic comedy film directed by Vincente Minnelli, starring Fred Astaire and Cyd Charisse. The plot follows an aging musical star who hopes a Broadway show will revive his career, but the play's director envisions a pretentious retelling of Faust and brings in a prima ballerina who clashes with the star. Although initially a box-office disappointment, the film is now regarded among the finest Metro-Goldwyn-Mayer musicals, alongside An American in Paris (1951), Singin' in the Rain (1952), and Gigi (1958).

Hollywood composer Arthur Schwartz and lyricist Howard Dietz wrote the songs, with orchestrations by Conrad Salinger, and dance and musical numbers staged by Michael Kidd. Schwartz and Dietz adapted parts of the score from their 1931 Broadway revue The Band Wagon, starring siblings Fred and Adele Astaire. The song "Dancing in the Dark", from the original Broadway production, is considered part of the Great American Songbook. Schwartz and Dietz wrote the song "That's Entertainment!" specifically for the film, a hit that subsequently became a standard in popular music.

Astaire's early number in the film, "A Shine on Your Shoes", was written for the 1932 Broadway revue Flying Colors, with score by Schwartz and Dietz. (It was originally performed by the dancing team of Buddy and Vilma Ebsen). For The Band Wagon film, the song was reworked as a specialty number by jazz arranger Skip Martin to showcase all of Astaire's musical talents. The song is the only time Astaire danced on-screen with a black dancer, the uncredited Leroy Daniels.

The musical director was Adolph Deutsch, and the production was designed by Oliver Smith working for the first time in motion pictures. The film was nominated for Academy Awards for Best Costume Design, Color; Best Music, Scoring of a Musical Picture; and Best Writing, Story and Screenplay.

Screenwriters Betty Comden and Adolph Green, who received the nomination for the screenplay, patterned the film's characters Lester and Lily Marton after themselves; however, the fictional characters were a married couple, and Comden and Green were not romantically involved. The character of an overachieving impresario was developed with the producer-director-actor José Ferrer in mind.

In 1995 The Band Wagon was selected for preservation in the United States National Film Registry by the Library of Congress as being "culturally, historically, or aesthetically significant". In 2006 this film ranked number 17 on the American Film Institute's list of best musicals.

== Plot ==
Tony Hunter, once a famous star of musical comedies on stage and later on screen, is largely forgotten after three years without appearing in a film. He returns from Hollywood to New York. At Grand Central Terminal he is recognized but almost ignored by reporters who are there by chance, as Ava Gardner is on the same train. However, he is greeted enthusiastically by his good friends Lester and Lily Marton, and they tell him they have written a stage show, a light musical comedy that will be a perfect comeback for Tony. They will also act in it, and they already have caught the interest of Jeffrey Cordova, who they say can do anything: Currently he is starring in, as well as directing, a new adaptation of Oedipus Rex that he wrote based on the original Greek story.

As soon as Jeffrey hears Lily outline the play, he declares it to be a brilliant reinterpretation of the Faust legend, which should star Tony and himself as the characters corresponding to Faust and the Devil. The Martons are delighted that he will be acting as well as directing, but Tony is dubious about the Faust idea. Jeffrey declares that the boundaries between genres in the theater are artificial, and "Bill Shakespeare" and Bill Robinson are all parts of the same whole. Tony agrees, and Jeffrey has the Martons rewrite the play as a dark, pretentious musical drama (when Lester also becomes dubious, Lily insists that one person must be in charge and Jeffrey can succeed at anything).

Jeffrey does succeed in arranging for the beautiful and talented ballerina Gabrielle "Gaby" Gerard to join the production, along with Paul Byrd, who is her boyfriend, choreographer, and manager—even though he always insisted that a musical play would be beneath her. When Tony and Gaby meet, they become sarcastic and hostile to each other, but this is actually because they are insecure: Each one feels much less talented than the other.

Eventually it all proves too much for Tony, and he walks out. Gaby follows to meet him privately. In his hotel room she comments that the paintings by famous artists on the wall are better reproductions than usual in a hotel; he says they are his own property and are originals. She recognizes a painting of ballerinas as an early Degas. Tony and Gaby put their troubles aside, go for a horse-drawn carriage ride, dance together, and realize they can work together after all. They also begin to fall in love.

When the first out-of-town tryout in New Haven proves disastrous, Tony demands that Jeffrey convert the production back into the light comedy that the Martons had envisioned. Jeffrey says that while they will have to find new backers because the original ones have walked out, he will be happy to appear in that show—if Tony is in charge of it. Tony accepts, using his art collection to finance the production. Paul says the show is no longer suitable for Gaby and walks out, expecting her to follow, but she is pleased to stay and work with Tony.

After some weeks on tour to perfect the new lighthearted musical numbers, the revised show proves to be a hit on its Broadway opening. Gaby professes her love to Tony.

== Cast ==
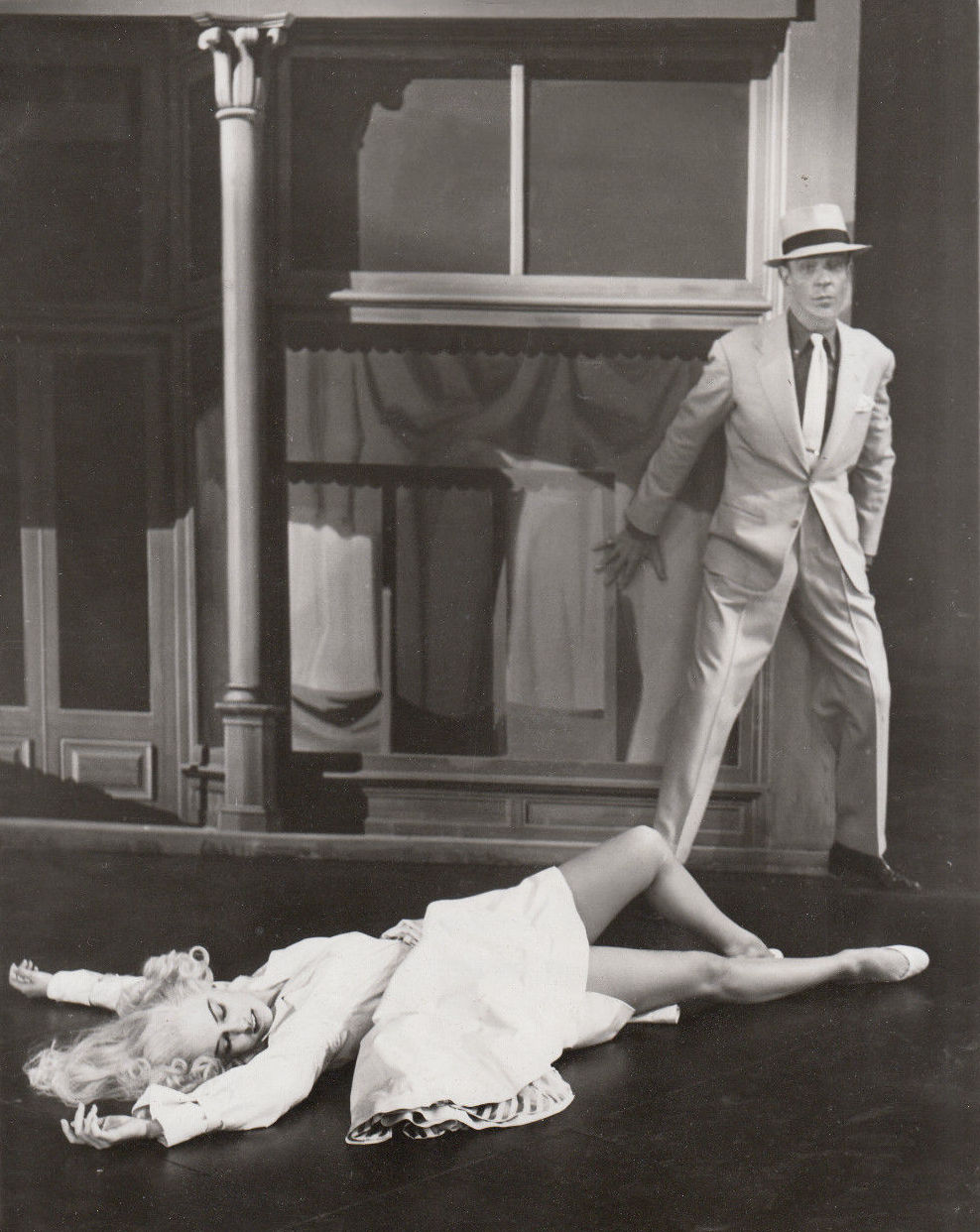
Fred Astaire and Cyd Charisse in the "Girl Hunt Ballet"

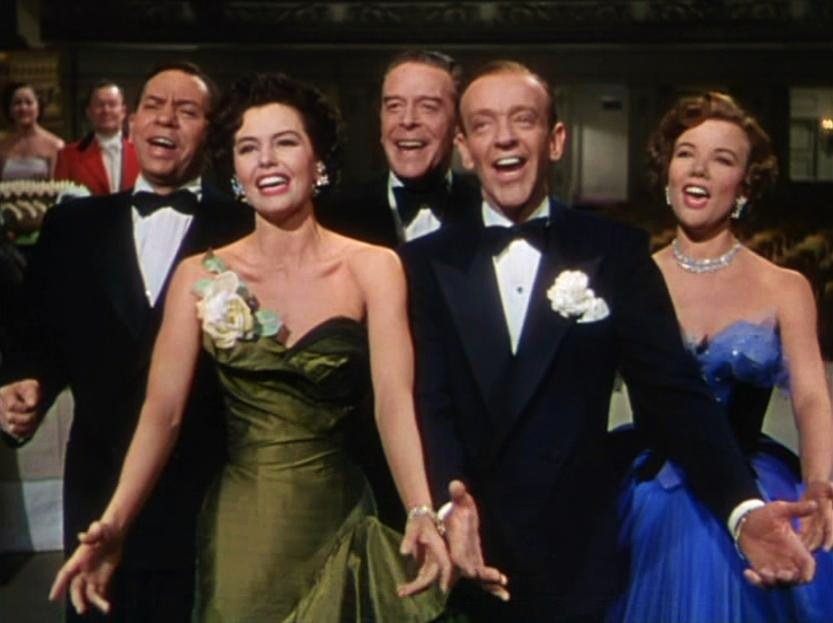
Finale, "That's Entertainment" (reprise). L–R: Oscar Levant, Cyd Charisse, Jack Buchanan, Fred Astaire, and Nanette Fabray

Billed

- Fred Astaire as Tony Hunter
- Cyd Charisse as Gabrielle Gerard
- Oscar Levant as Lester Marton
- Nanette Fabray as Lily Marton
- Jack Buchanan as Jeffrey Cordova
- James Mitchell as Paul Byrd
- Robert Gist as Hal Benton

Unbilled

- India Adams as the singing voice of Cyd Charisse
- Ava Gardner as herself (cameo)
- Thurston Hall as Colonel Tripp
- Douglas Fowley as auctioneer
- Madge Blake as investor
- Judy Landon as dancer in troupe
- Bobby Watson as Bobby
- Sue Casey as tall girl in arcade
- Leroy Daniels as shoeshine man in arcade in "Shine on Your Shoes"
- Henry Corden as orchestra leader
- Julie Newmar as model / chorine in "Girl Hunt Ballet"
- Fred Aldrich as hot dog vendor
- Richard Alexander as stagehand
- Jimmy Thompson as Jimmy
- Roy Engel as reporter
- Emory Parnell as man on train
- Herb Vigran as man on train
- Dee Turnell as Barbara
- Dee Hartford as model in "Girl Hunt Ballet"

== Musical numbers ==
1. "By Myself" – Tony (introduced in the stage musical Between the Devil)
2. "Shine on Your Shoes" – Tony and a shoeshine man (Leroy Daniels; the song was first introduced in the stage musical Flying Colors)
3. "That's Entertainment!" – Jeffrey, with Tony, Lester and Lily. This sequence was used in the film Joker: Folie à Deux from 2024.
4. "The Beggars Waltz" – danced by Gabrielle, James Mitchell, and corps de ballet
5. "High and Low" – Chorus
6. "Dancing in the Dark" – danced by Tony and Gabrielle
7. "You and the Night and the Music" – Chorus, danced by Tony and Gabrielle
8. "Something to Remember You By" – Chorus
9. "I Love Louisa" – Tony, Lester, and Lily
10. "New Sun in the Sky" – Gabrielle
11. "I Guess I'll Have to Change My Plan" – Tony and Jeffrey
12. "Louisiana Hayride" – Lily and Chorus (the song was first introduced in the stage musical Flying Colors)
13. "Triplets" – Tony, Jeffrey, and Lily (the performers dance on their knees, costumed in baby attire; the song was first introduced in the stage musical Between the Devil)
14. "The Girl Hunt Ballet" (inspired by the novels of Mickey Spillane) – danced by Tony and Gabrielle. The music video of Smooth Criminal by Michael Jackson was heavily inspired by this sequence.
15. "That's Entertainment!" (reprise/finale) – Lester, Gabrielle, Jeffrey, Tony and Lily

One musical number shot for the film, but dropped from the final release, was a seductive dance routine featuring Charisse performing "Two-Faced Woman". As with the other Charisse songs, her singing was dubbed by India Adams. Adams' recording of the song was reused for Torch Song (1953) for a musical number featuring Joan Crawford. The MGM retrospective That's Entertainment! III (1994) released the Charisse version to the public for the first time. This footage was included with the 2005 DVD release of The Band Wagon.

== Release ==
In seven weeks at Radio City Music Hall in New York City, the film grossed $1,044,000, one of the higher grossing films at the theater. According to MGM records, the film earned distributor rentals of $2.3 million in the U.S. and Canada and $1,202,000 in other countries, resulting in a whopping loss of $1,185,000.

== Reception ==
In a 1999 Guardian article about the importance of the film, Derek Desmond wrote: "But the whole point about The Band Wagon, and one which sometimes makes people underrate it, was the way everything seems to mesh so seamlessly—almost effortlessly, in fact. That was due to Minnelli, whose flair and imagination, admittedly aided by the huge array of MGM talent both behind and in front of the cameras, was matched by his almost perfect control." Pauline Kael wrote: "The Comden-Green script isn't as consistently fresh as the one they did for Singin' in the Rain but there have been few screen musicals as good as this one, starring those two great song-and-dance men Fred Astaire and Jack Buchanan." Leslie Halliwell lauded the film: "Simple but sophisticated musical with the bare minimum of plot, told mostly in jokes, and the maximum of music and song ... Level of technical accomplishment very high." Leonard Maltin gave it four of four stars: "Sophisticated backstage musical improves with each viewing."

Martin Scorsese listed The Band Wagon as his favorite musical.

== Stage adaptation ==
Poster from 2014 production at the New York City Center

A musical stage adaptation, titled Dancing in the Dark, ran at the Old Globe Theatre in San Diego from March 4 to April 20, 2008, with plans to bring the show to Broadway. Gary Griffin directed, with a book by Douglas Carter Beane and choreography by Warren Carlyle. The cast included Patrick Page as the "deliciously pretentious" director-actor-producer Jeffrey Cordova, Mara Davi playing Gabrielle Gerard, and Scott Bakula as "song-and-dance man" Tony Hunter.

In the Variety review of the musical, Bob Verini wrote: "There's no reason this reconstituted Band Wagon can't soar once it jettisons its extraneous and self-contradictory elements."

A revised version of the stage adaptation under the name The Band Wagon was presented in a staged concert in November 2014 as part of a New York City Center Encores! special event. The cast starred Brian Stokes Mitchell, Tracey Ullman, Michael McKean, Tony Sheldon, and Laura Osnes, with direction and choreography by Kathleen Marshall.

== Works cited ==
- Wilson, Michael (2011). Scorsese On Scorsese. Cahiers du Cinéma. ISBN 9782866427023.
