= The Baby-Roast =

Urban legend

The Baby-Roast, also known as The Hippy Babysitter and The Cooked Baby, is an urban legend in which a baby is roasted alive at home by a babysitter or sibling. It is "one of the classic urban legends". There have been a few isolated cases where babies have been roasted.

== Legend ==
In some versions, the baby is accidentally cooked when miscommunication occurs. For example, "put the turkey in the oven and the baby in the bed" is wrongly heard as "put the baby in the oven and the turkey in the bed". In other variants, the protagonist is intoxicated with drugs or alcohol, or insane. In the end, the roasted baby is sometimes served as food to be consumed by the parents.

The person who roasts the baby is usually a babysitter or the baby's sibling.

== Documented occurrences ==
There have been documented occurrences of babies being roasted.

In 1999, Elizabeth Renee Otte put her baby Joseph Lewis Martinez into a microwave oven which resulted in his death. She was sentenced to 5 years in prison for involuntary manslaughter.

In 2002, Melissa Wright of Millbrook, Alabama, placed her 14-month-old daughter into a oven set on broil. The girl survived, but had third degree burns over 30 percent of her body and required years of surgery. Wright was imprisoned for attempted murder and was denied parole in 2016.

In 2005, China Arnold murdered her daughter Paris Talley in a microwave oven.

In May 2012, a British citizen was arrested by Thai police after being found in possession of six corpses of roasted infants, some wrapped in gold leaf, reportedly in conformity with a "black magic ritual".

On November 16, 2015, a one-year old baby, J'Zyra Thompson, died after her three-year-old sibling put her in the oven and cooked her alive. Their mother, Racqual Thompson, left her four children at home, which included a five-year-old and a two-year-old, when she went to pick up a pizza. When they returned home, Thompson found J'Zyra's body cooked in the oven. Thompson and her boyfriend of ten months, 21-year-old Cornell Malone, were charged with endangering a child. Both adults were then sentenced to 12 years in prison for abandoning a child under 15 years old.

In March 2016, a 35-year-old mother in Texas showed up naked at her neighbor's door with her partially burned and naked 2-year-old daughter. When police arrived, she confessed that she had put the girl in the oven along with a cat she had recently shot dead, while making sexual advances toward an officer and singing praise to God. According to an affidavit from the Texas Department of Family and Protective Services, she seemed unconcerned with her daughter while in hospital and jail, where she was charged with injury to a child with serious bodily injury and tested positive for alcohol, marijuana and methamphetamine. The girl was put in foster care.

== In popular culture ==
In the 1979 blaxploitation film Disco Godfather, a PCP addict claims to have honey-roasted her baby for her family's Easter dinner, ostensibly so the baby's crying wouldn't spoil the occasion.

In August 2009, a joke advertisement showcasing a "body part roaster" "specially designed to roast infants and other human morsels" surfaced on the website of retailer Sears.com.

The song 'Babysitter on Acid' by the all-female punk rock band, Lunachicks is a retelling of the urban legend. The teenage babysitter, under the influence of drugs, roasts the baby in the oven and says to the mother over the phone "Wanna know how the baby is? / Don't worry, she's almost done". The song was released on their 1990 album Babysitters On Acid.

== See also ==
- Atreus
- A Modest Proposal
- Letitia Lerner, Superman's Babysitter
