= India Adams =

American singer (1927–2020)

- Born: Patricia Sue Perlin; March 5, 1927; Los Angeles, California, U.S.
- Died: April 25, 2020 (aged 93); Los Angeles, California, U.S.
- Occupations: Actress, singer
- Years active: 1943–2020
- Partner(s): Jack Stanley (m. 1951; div. 1970) Quentin Rance (m. 1974; died 2016)
- Children: 2
- Parents: Harry Perlin; Serena Perlin

India Adams (March 5, 1927 – April 25, 2020) was an American singer, known for dubbing various actresses' singing in numerous films during the 1950s. She was most known for dubbing the singing of Cyd Charisse in The Bandwagon (1953) and Joan Crawford in Torch Song (1953).

== Career ==
She dubbed the singing voices for Charisse in The Band Wagon (1953). That same year, she also dubbed for Crawford in Torch Song (1953).

Adams lived in England from 1965 to 1981. There, from 1969 to 1970, she was the understudy to Ginger Rogers for the West End stage production of Mame at the Theatre Royal, Drury Lane, London.

In 1991, together with two other prominent ghost singers, Jo Ann Greer and Annette Warren, she starred in the cabaret revue Voices, produced by Alan Eichler, under the musical direction of John McDaniel, at the Hollywood Roosevelt Hotel.

After spending another twenty years out of the public eye, Adams reappeared in early 1991, when she performed with several other singers at the Catalina Bar and Grill. She still remained active performing in clubs and musicals.

== Personal life and death ==
Adams married advertising executive Jack Stanley in 1951. Adams died at the age of 93 on April 25, 2020.

== Discography ==
- India Adams Sings! (ca. 1980s)
- Comfort Me with Apples – with Ray Martin and His Orchestra (RCA Victor, 1959)
- India Adams Sings Again (ca. 1980s)
