= Dayton Correctional Institution =

State prison for women in Ohio, US

Coordinates: 39°43′44″N 84°15′27″W

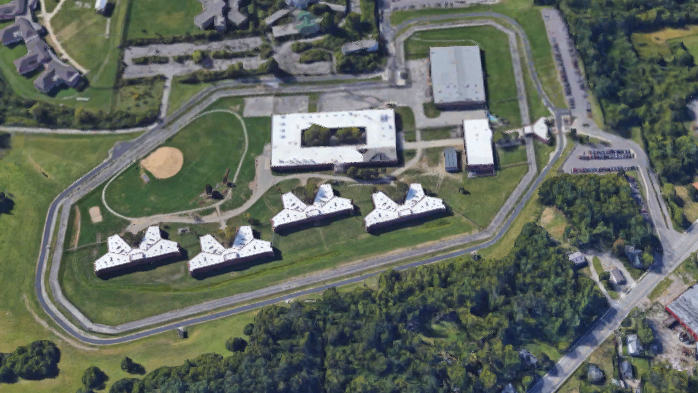
- Interactive map of Dayton Correctional Institution
- Location: 4104 Germantown Street Dayton, Ohio
- Status: open
- Security class: mixed
- Capacity: 938
- Opened: 1987
- Managed by: Ohio Department of Rehabilitation and Correction

The Dayton Correctional Institution is a state prison for women located in Dayton, Montgomery County, Ohio, opened in 1987, owned and operated by the Ohio Department of Rehabilitation and Correction. The facility holds a maximum of 938 female inmates at various security levels.

In February 2026, ODRC transferred 150 inmates to other facilities after closing a unit to address staffing shortages at the facility.

== Notable inmates ==
- China P. Arnold, convicted of the murder of her daughter
- Debra Brown, serial killer serving life imprisonment without the possibility of parole for the murder of eight people
- Jessica Groves, convicted alongside her husband Daniel, for the killing of their four-month-old son Dylan.
- Lindsey Partin, guilty of the murder of Hannah Wesche, a 3-year-old child enrolled at her in-home daycare.
- Laura Jeanne Taylor, convicted for role in 1992 Dayton Christmas murders.
- Andrea Morgan Ross, convicted of involuntary manslaughter
