= Rudy Render =

- Born: Rudolph Valentino Render; July 1, 1926; Terre Haute, Indiana, United States
- Died: September 11, 2014 (aged 88) Los Angeles, California, United States
- Genres: Rhythm and blues, jazz
- Occupations: Singer, arranger
- Instrument: Piano
- Years active: c.1945–1972
- Labels: London, others

Rudolph Valentino Render (July 1, 1926 – September 11, 2014) was an American singer, musician, arranger and songwriter, best known for his 1949 R&B chart hit, "Sneakin' Around" and his work as musical director for Debbie Reynolds.

== Biography ==
He was born in Terre Haute, Indiana, and studied piano in college. While at Indiana State University in May 1946 Rudy became a charter member of the Chi Sigma chapter of Omega Psi Phi fraternity. He began playing in clubs in Terre Haute, and was seen there by writer Bill Hays, the son of politician Will H. Hays, deviser of the Hays Code. At Bill Hays' suggestion, Render moved to Hollywood, California after completing his degree studies, and through agent Berle Adams was immediately offered the chance to record Jessie Mae Robinson's song "Sneakin' Around" for London Records. The song rose to number 2 on the Billboard R&B chart in 1949. However, shortly afterwards Render was called up for military service, cutting short his recording career.

After leaving the US Army, he had a small cameo role in the 1953 Joan Crawford film Torch Song, before completing his education to earn a master's degree at Indiana State Teachers College. He recorded unsuccessfully for small record labels, and in 1959 co-wrote with Charles Lederer the title music for the film It Started with a Kiss, starring Debbie Reynolds, whose brother was a friend. He became Debbie Reynolds' musical director, working with her on stage shows and the 1964 film The Unsinkable Molly Brown, for which she was nominated for an Academy Award.

He left the music business in 1972, and worked as an elementary school teacher in the North Hollywood area until he retired in 2001. He died in 2014, aged 88.
