= Murder of Paris Talley =

2005 infanticide in Ohio, United States

- Location: Dayton, Ohio, U.S.
- Date: August 30, 2005
- Weapon: Microwave oven
- Victim: Paris Talley
- Perpetrator: China Arnold
- Convictions: Aggravated murder

On August 30, 2005, four-week-old Paris Talley was murdered by her mother, 25-year-old China Arnold. The murder attracted widespread attention in 2006, when it was reported that Talley was killed by being put into a microwave oven.

In 2008, Arnold was convicted of aggravated murder and sentenced to life in prison without the possibility of parole. In 2010, the ruling was reversed, with a retrial again convicting Arnold of aggravated murder the following year.

== Background ==
There had previously been only one known case of infanticide via microwave overheating, also in the United States. Five-week-old Joseph Lewis Martinez had been killed by his mother, 19-year-old Elizabeth Renee Otte, on September 23, 1999, in New Kent County, Virginia. In Martinez's case, it was decided that Otte had mistaken the child for a bottle of milk during an epileptic seizure, leading to a reduced charge and conviction of involuntary manslaughter, for which she served a five-year prison sentence.

== Case ==
China Arnold (born March 29, 1980) and her children lived with her boyfriend, Terrell Talley, in a housing complex in Dayton, Ohio. Arnold had been convicted of abduction in 2000 and forgery in 2002.

On August 30, 2005, there was an argument over Paris' paternity. They got in a fight and her anger turned into violence, after which 28-day-old Paris was placed in a microwave for two minutes. She then removed the baby and put her on the table. Paris had died within seconds due to the heat. Arnold then brought Paris to Children's Medical Center. Medical experts said the baby died after her temperature reached 107–108 °F (41.7–42.2 °C). She had no external burns but did suffer high-heat internal injuries.

Finding Paris cold and stiff with burn marks on her body the next day, her parents took her to the hospital where she was pronounced dead. Arnold told investigators that she had been intoxicated. John Paul Rion, the attorney who represented Arnold at her first trial, said she was intoxicated to the point of blacking out when the child died.

=== Arrests ===
Arnold was arrested and subsequently released due to a lack of evidence. She was rearrested on November 25, 2006.

=== Trials ===
While in jail awaiting trial, Arnold became sexually involved with her cellmate, Linda Williams, who later testified that Arnold confessed her guilt to her.

==== First trial ====
Shortly after Arnold's first trial began in February 2008, Terrell Talley said his son had told him that he pulled Paris' lifeless body out of the microwave after a neighbor's boyfriend had put her inside. An eight-year-old neighbor separately told the judge during private testimony that he saw another boy carrying and placing Paris inside the microwave; the eight-year-old's mother and others later disputed that he was present at the apartment at the time. The judge declared a mistrial.

==== Second trial ====
During the second trial, Arnold testified that her significant other was not at the housing complex when Paris died. Arnold was convicted of aggravated murder and sentenced to life in prison without the possibility of parole on September 8, 2008. She was incarcerated at the Dayton Correctional Institution.

On November 5, 2010, the Ohio Second District Court of Appeals reversed Arnold's conviction, citing prosecutorial misconduct, and stated that the court erred by not allowing material witnesses to testify in her defense.

==== Third trial ====
On May 13, 2011, a jury found Arnold guilty of aggravated murder. Her attorney had argued that the evidence pointed as much to Talley as it did her, but failed to convince the jury. On May 20, Arnold was again sentenced to life in prison without parole, with both the jury and judge rejecting the death penalty option. Her attorney said they would appeal the decision.

In September 2013, Arnold's lawyer requested a new trial in the Second District Court of Appeals, claiming multiple errors were made in her case. In December 2013, the 2nd District Court of Appeals affirmed the conviction. An appeal regarding her life sentence was made citing constitutional questions about double jeopardy, asking the Ohio Supreme Court to reverse the 2nd District Court of Appeals decision and send the case back to the trial court "for re-sentencing", but in May 2014, the Court decided not to take up the appeal.

==== Sentencing ====
Arnold is currently incarcerated at the Dayton Correctional Institution in Dayton, Ohio serving her sentence of life without the possibility of parole.

== See also ==
- The Baby-Roast
