= Dolemite Is My Name =

2019 film directed by Craig Brewer

- Theatrical release poster
- Directed by: Craig Brewer
- Written by: Scott Alexander Larry Karaszewski
- Produced by: Eddie Murphy; John Davis; John Fox
- Starring: Eddie Murphy; Keegan-Michael Key; Mike Epps; Craig Robinson; Da'Vine Joy Randolph; Tituss Burgess; Wesley Snipes
- Cinematography: Eric Steelberg
- Edited by: Billy Fox
- Music by: Scott Bomar
- Production company: Davis Entertainment
- Distributed by: Netflix
- Release dates: September 7, 2019 (TIFF); October 4, 2019 (United States)
- Running time: 118 minutes
- Country: United States
- Language: English

Dolemite Is My Name is a 2019 American biographical comedy-drama film directed by Craig Brewer and written by Scott Alexander and Larry Karaszewski. The film stars Eddie Murphy as filmmaker Rudy Ray Moore, who is best known for having portrayed the character of Dolemite in both his stand-up routine and a series of blaxploitation films, which started with Dolemite in 1975.

The film had its world premiere at the Toronto International Film Festival on September 7, 2019. It was released in a limited release on October 4, and streaming on Netflix three weeks later. Dolemite Is My Name received positive reception from both audiences and film critics, with praise for Murphy's performance and the humor. It was chosen by both the National Board of Review and Time magazine as one of the ten best films of the year. At the 77th Golden Globe Awards, the film was nominated for Best Motion Picture – Musical or Comedy and Murphy was nominated for the Golden Globe Award for Best Actor – Motion Picture Musical or Comedy.

== Plot ==
Struggling artist Rudy Ray Moore works in historic record store Dolphin's of Hollywood in 1970s L.A., trying to get on the air in the in-store radio station. He moonlights as an MC for his friend Ben Taylor and band at a club. Asking the club owner for a comedy time slot, he is turned down.

One day, homeless man Ricco wanders into the record store, making loud, rhyming proclamations; one of which includes the name "Dolemite". (The real Moore recorded a number of prominent street poets, including Big Brown.) Moore creates a stage persona telling stories at the club. Dressing as a pimp and brandishing a cane, he is Dolemite, launching into a crudely humorous and foul-mouthed routine "The Signifying Monkey". Taylor's group join him on-stage as back up. The crowd applauds.

Moore asks his aunt for money to record the comedy album "Eat Out More Often". His friend Jimmy Lynch records him at his home in front of an audience. Making several copies of the record, Moore fails to convince major labels to sell it, so he instead sells them out of his car trunk. The record becomes popular through word-of-mouth and gains the attention of the Bihari brothers, who strike a deal with Moore to market it to record stores. Moore offers to go on tour through the Deep South promoting it. While in Mississippi, he befriends single mother Lady Reed and convinces her to join him as part of his act in the role of "Queen Bee", the experienced madame to Dolemite's harem of hoes.

Celebrating the tour's success by watching a movie, The Front Page, the theater's majority-white audience finds the film hilarious but Moore and his friends don't. He is inspired to make a film starring Dolemite. Turned down by a film executive from a distribution company promoting other blaxploitation films, who said he was a bit "doughier" than their other stars, Moore asks his record company for an advance on royalties to fund it himself. They agree but warn him that if he fails, he will be in debt to them for the rest of his life.

Moore contacts playwright Jerry Jones who, despite initial reluctance, agrees to write the screenplay. Moore and Taylor go to a strip club and find character actor D'Urville Martin, offering him a role in the film. Initially offended, Moore persuades him by giving him the opportunity to direct the film himself. They convert the old, abandoned Dunbar Hotel into a makeshift soundstage. Jones invites a group of white UCLA film students to be the film crew, including Nicholas Josef von Sternberg as cinematographer.

Moore, Martin, Jones and crew begin filming Dolemite, a kung-fu-themed blaxploitation film, but Moore's unfamiliarity with karate and predilection towards camp disgusts Martin. Despite much of the cast and crew enjoying making the film, he quits soon after filming is completed, but first belittles them, proclaiming the film will never be seen by anyone.

Martin's words seem to come true as no film distributor will purchase the film. Moore returns to touring unenthusiastically. In Indiana, asked about the film's release by a local DJ, he remains noncommittal about whether the film will ever be seen. The DJ offers to premiere it in town with enough promotion. Taking him up on it, Moore single-handedly promotes it all around town. Though he spends a lot on four wall distribution, Moore is pleased to see a massive crowd waiting outside the theater, and the audience greatly enjoys the film.

Hollywood film executive Lawrence Woolner, whose studio Dimension Pictures had previously rejected Dolemite, hears about the Indiana premiere. He contacts Moore, promising to distribute the film. Moore arrives at Dimension Pictures dressed as Dolemite with Lady Reed and the crew dressed up as well. The executive says that, although Moore could continue promoting the film himself, he would not see profits right away. However, Dimension Pictures could put the film in theaters and everyone would profit. Moore agrees, beginning to promote it.

En route to the Hollywood premiere, Moore and the cast read negative reviews of the film, lowering their spirits. Upon arrival, however, the group is astonished to see an even bigger crowd of people cheering for them outside the theater. While the cast and crew go inside to see the film, Moore stays outside to entertain the crowd who must wait for the next show.

Rudy Ray Moore continued to tour and star in sequels to Dolemite until his death in 2008. Today he's considered to be the "Godfather of Rap".

== Cast ==
- Eddie Murphy as Rudy Ray Moore
- Da'Vine Joy Randolph as Lady Reed
- Keegan-Michael Key as Jerry Jones
- Mike Epps as Jimmy Lynch
- Craig Robinson as Ben Taylor
- Tituss Burgess as Theodore Toney
- Wesley Snipes as D'Urville Martin
- Aleksandar Filimonović as Joseph Bihari
- Tip "T.I." Harris as Walter Crane
- Kodi Smit-McPhee as Nicholas Josef Von Sternberg
- Ron Cephas Jones as Ricco
- Luenell as Aunt
- Gerald Downey as Bob Brooks
- Chris Rock as Bobby Vale
- Snoop Dogg as Roj
- Bob Odenkirk as Lawrence Woolner (uncredited)
- Joshua Weinstein as John McCarthy
- Allen Rueckert as Allan Jon Fox
- Ivo Nandi as Julius Bihari
- Baker Chase Powell as Steven Dodd
- Barry Shabaka Henley as Demond
- Tasha Smith as Jimmy's Wife
- Jill Savel as White Actress
- Milan Carter as Larry Munn

== Production ==
Eddie Murphy has stated that a biopic of Rudy Ray Moore had long been a dream project for him. Murphy initially met screenwriters Scott Alexander and Larry Karaszewski in 2003 and they began developing the project. Murphy arranged a meeting between the two writers with Moore, who told him many of his life stories before his death in 2008. However, the early attempts to make the film never came to fruition.

On June 7, 2018, it was announced that Craig Brewer would direct Dolemite Is My Name from a script by Scott Alexander and Larry Karaszewski with Netflix producing and distributing. Eddie Murphy was set to star as Moore. Later that month, the rest of the principal cast was announced. In July 2018, Chris Rock and Ron Cephas Jones joined the cast. Principal photography began on June 12, 2018. Nicholas Josef von Sternberg, the director of photography of the original Dolemite, visited the set during filming, and according to Brewer, contributed additional stories that didn't make it into the film.

== Release ==
Dolemite Is My Name had its world premiere at the Toronto International Film Festival on September 7, 2019. It was released in a limited release on October 4, 2019, and digital streaming on October 25, 2019.

== Reception ==
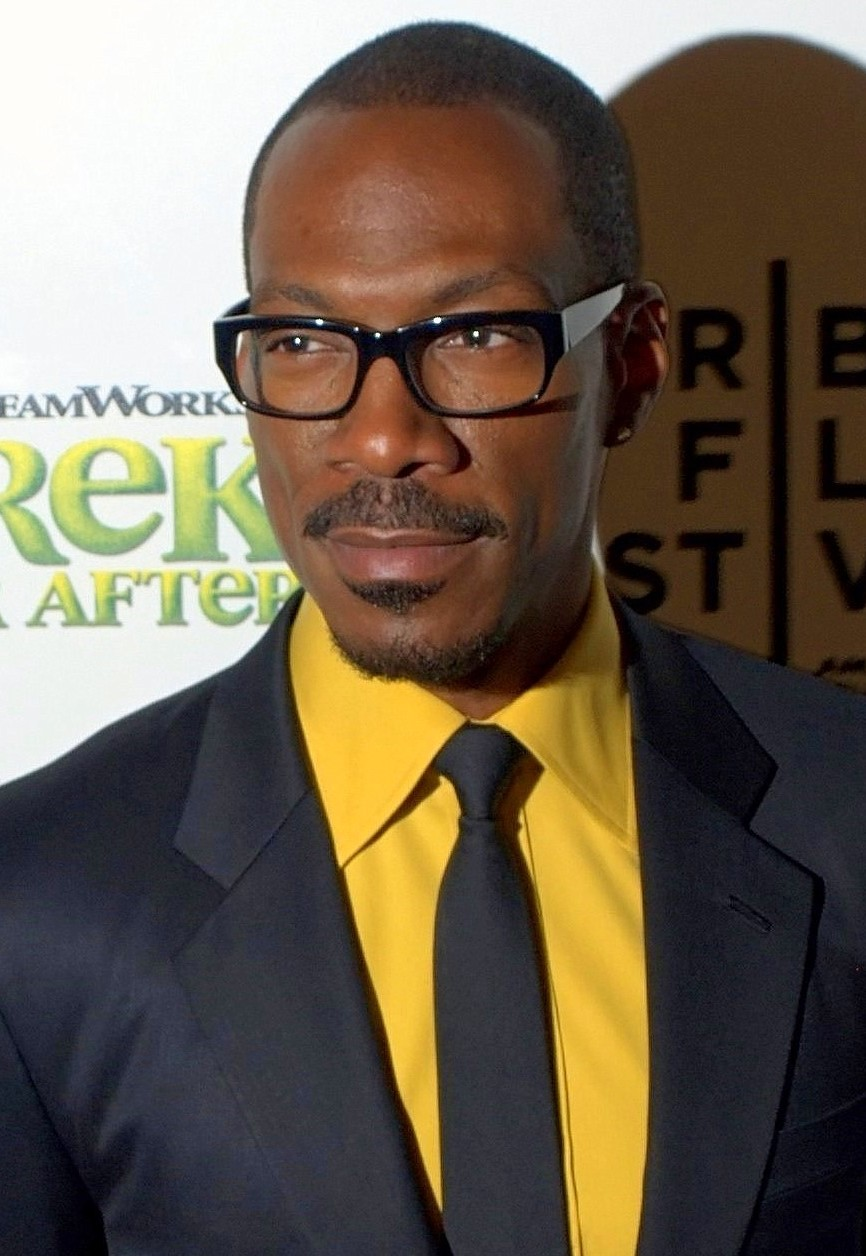
Eddie Murphy's performance as Rudy Ray Moore garnered critical acclaim and was called a successful comeback.

=== Critical response ===
On review aggregator website Rotten Tomatoes, the film has an approval rating of 97% based on 233 reviews, with an average rating of 7.9/10. The website's critics consensus reads: "In dramatizing Rudy Ray Moore's stranger-than-fiction story, Eddie Murphy makes Dolemite Is My Name just as bold, brash, and ultimately hard to resist as its subject." On Metacritic, it has a weighted average score of 76 out of 100, based on 39 critics, indicating "generally favorable" reviews.

In Variety, Owen Gleiberman described Murphy's performance as some kind of a comeback, writing: "As the brash hustler who made Dolemite, Eddie Murphy has his best role in years in a film that's like a blaxploitation answer to The Disaster Artist... He plays Rudy as a cheap but priceless carny barker of his own ego."

=== Accolades ===
Award	Category	Subject	Result
AAFCA Awards	Top 10 Films		Won
AAFCA Awards	Best Actor	Eddie Murphy	Won
AAFCA Awards	Best Supporting Actress	Da'Vine Joy Randolph	Won
ACE Eddie Awards	Best Edited Feature Film – Comedy or Musical	Billy Fox	Nominated
Black Reel Awards	Outstanding Film	Eddie Murphy, John Fox and John Davis	Won
Black Reel Awards	Outstanding Actor	Eddie Murphy	Won
Black Reel Awards	Outstanding Supporting Actor	Wesley Snipes	Won
Black Reel Awards	Outstanding Supporting Actress	Da'Vine Joy Randolph	Won
Black Reel Awards	Outstanding Breakthrough Performance, Female	Da'Vine Joy Randolph	Won
Black Reel Awards	Outstanding Breakthrough Performance, Male	Tituss Burgess	Nominated
Black Reel Awards	Outstanding Ensemble	Lindsay Graham, Mary Vernieu	Won
Black Reel Awards	Outstanding Original Score	Scott Bomar	Nominated
Black Reel Awards	Outstanding Costume Design	Ruth E. Carter	Won
Casting Society of America	Feature Big Budget – Comedy	Mary Vernieu, Lindsay Graham Ahanonu	Nominated
Costume Designers Guild Award	Excellence in Period Film	Ruth E. Carter	Nominated
Critics' Choice Movie Awards	Best Actor	Eddie Murphy	Nominated
Critics' Choice Movie Awards	Best Costume Design	Ruth E. Carter	Won
Critics' Choice Movie Awards	Best Hair & Makeup		Nominated
Critics' Choice Movie Awards	Best Comedy		Won
DFCS Awards	Best Supporting Actor	Wesley Snipes	Nominated
DFCS Awards	Best Ensemble		Nominated
Golden Globe Awards	Best Motion Picture – Musical or Comedy		Nominated
Golden Globe Awards	Best Actor – Motion Picture Musical or Comedy	Eddie Murphy	Nominated
Golden Raspberry Awards	Razzie Redeemer Award	Eddie Murphy	Won
LAOFCS Awards	Best Actor	Eddie Murphy	Nominated
LAOFCS Awards	Best Costume Design	Ruth E. Carter	Nominated
LAOFCS Awards	Best Comedy/Musical Film		Nominated
Location Managers Guild Awards	Outstanding Locations in a Period Film	David B Lyons, Russel Hadaya	Nominated
National Board of Review	Top Ten Films		Won
NAACP Image Awards	Outstanding Motion Picture	Dolemite Is My Name	Nominated
NAACP Image Awards	Outstanding Actor in a Motion Picture	Eddie Murphy	Nominated
NAACP Image Awards	Outstanding Supporting Actor in a Motion Picture	Tituss Burgess	Nominated
NAACP Image Awards	Outstanding Supporting Actor in a Motion Picture	Wesley Snipes	Nominated
NAACP Image Awards	Outstanding Supporting Actress in a Motion Picture	Da'Vine Joy Randolph	Nominated
NAACP Image Awards	Outstanding Independent Motion Picture	Dolemite Is My Name	Won
NAACP Image Awards	Outstanding Ensemble Cast in a Motion Picture	Dolemite Is My Name	Nominated
SDFCS Awards	Best Actor	Eddie Murphy	Nominated
SDFCS Awards	Best Comedic Performance	Eddie Murphy	Nominated
SDFCS Awards	Best Comedic Performance	Wesley Snipes	Won
SDFCS Awards	Best Supporting Actor	Wesley Snipes	Nominated
SDFCS Awards	Best Costume Design	Ruth E. Carter	Won
SDFCS Awards	Best Production Design	Clay A. Griffith	Nominated
Satellite Awards	Best Actor – Motion Picture Musical or Comedy	Eddie Murphy	Nominated
Satellite Awards	Best Costume Design	Ruth E. Carter	Won
SLFCA Awards	Best Film		Nominated
SLFCA Awards	Best Comedy Film		Nominated
SLFCA Awards	Best Actor	Eddie Murphy	Nominated
SLFCA Awards	Best Supporting Actor	Wesley Snipes	Nominated

== See also ==
- List of black films of the 2010s
