= Alton Coleman =

American serial killer (1955–2002)

- Born: November 6, 1955; Waukegan, Illinois, U.S.
- Died: April 26, 2002 (aged 46); Southern Ohio Correctional Facility, Ohio, U.S.
- Spouse: Debra Brown
- Status: Executed by lethal injection
- Convictions: Federal; Kidnapping; Ohio; Aggravated murder (2 counts); Attempted aggravated murder Aggravated robbery Aggravated burglary Illinois; Murder; Aggravated kidnapping Armed robbery Battery; Indiana; Murder; Attempted murder Child molestation
- Penalty: Federal; 20 years imprisonment Ohio; Death; Illinois; Death; Indiana; Death

Details
- Victims: 8
- Span of crimes: May 29 – July 17, 1984
- Country: United States
- States: Illinois, Ohio, Wisconsin, Indiana, Michigan, Kentucky
- Date apprehended: July 20, 1984

Alton Coleman (November 6, 1955 – April 26, 2002) was an American serial killer who, along with accomplice Debra Brown (born November 11, 1962), committed a crime spree across six states between May and July 1984 that resulted in the deaths of eight people. Coleman, who received death sentences in three states, was executed by the state of Ohio in 2002. Brown was sentenced to death in Illinois and Indiana, but the sentences were later reduced to life imprisonment without parole and 140 years, respectively.

== Criminal background ==
=== Alton Coleman ===
Alton Coleman was born on November 6, 1955, in Waukegan, Illinois. His mother worked three jobs, and he lived with his 73-year-old grandmother. Coleman was well known to local law enforcement, having been charged with sex crimes six times between 1973 and 1983. Two of those cases were dismissed. Coleman served three years in prison after pleading guilty to armed robbery in a 1973 case where he and an accomplice kidnapped and raped a woman, then stole $100 from her car. Coleman was scheduled to go on trial in Illinois on charges stemming from the rape of a 14-year-old girl when he fled and began his killing spree. In 1976, Coleman was charged with three counts of deviate sexual assault for raping three fellow inmates in jail. However, he was only convicted of battery and received a six-month sentence.

Coleman was diagnosed with mixed personality disorder with "probable" antisocial, narcissistic and obsessive features, with additional diagnoses including epileptic spasms, psychosis and borderline personality disorder.

=== Debra Brown ===
Debra Brown was born on November 11, 1962. She is one of eleven children, is borderline intellectually disabled, suffered head trauma as a child and was diagnosed with dependent personality disorder by a psychiatrist. She was engaged to another man when she met Coleman in 1983, but left her family and moved in with him shortly afterwards. Although a willing participant in Coleman's assaults and murders, Brown had no history of violence or any criminal history prior to their relationship.

== Murders ==
=== Wisconsin and Illinois ===
Coleman and Brown committed their first murder when they killed nine-year-old Vernita Wheat from Kenosha, Wisconsin. After Coleman had befriended her mother, Juanita Wheat, he abducted Vernita and took her to Waukegan on May 29, 1984. Vernita's badly decomposed body was discovered on June 19 in an abandoned building four blocks from the apartment of Coleman's grandmother. It was determined she had been raped, and the cause of death was ligature strangulation.

On May 31, Coleman befriended Robert Carpenter in Waukegan and spent the night at his home. The next day he "borrowed" Carpenter's car to go to the store and never returned.

=== Indiana and Michigan ===
In June 1984, Coleman and Brown encountered two young girls in Gary, Indiana: 9-year-old Annie Turks and her niece, 7-year-old Tamika Turks. The couple sexually assaulted the two children. Annie survived the violent attack, but Tamika did not; her partially decomposed body was discovered on June 19. The same day, Donna Williams, a 25-year-old woman from Gary, disappeared. On July 11 her decomposed body was discovered in Detroit, Michigan, about half a mile from where her car was found. She had been raped and killed by ligature strangulation.

On June 28, Coleman and Brown entered the home of Palmer Jones and his wife, Marjorie of Dearborn Heights, Michigan, whom they beat severely. Coleman ripped the telephone from their wall before stealing money and their car.

=== Ohio ===
On July 5, Coleman and Brown arrived in Toledo, Ohio, where Coleman befriended Virginia Temple, the mother of several children. After Temple stopped communicating with her relatives, police entered her home and found her young children alone and frightened. Temple and her eldest child, 9-year-old Rachelle, had been strangled to death and left in a crawl space.

On the same morning as the Temple murders, Coleman and Brown entered the home of Frank and Dorothy Duvendack, in Toledo, who were bound with electrical cords. The couple stole the Duvendacks' money and car, and Mrs. Duvendack's stolen watch was later found under another victim. Later that day, Coleman and Brown visited the Dayton home of the Reverend Millard Gay and his wife, Kathryn. The two stayed with the Gays and accompanied them to a religious service on July 9; the next day, the Gays dropped off the couple in downtown Cincinnati.

On July 12, Tonnie Storey, a 15-year-old girl who lived in Cincinnati's Over-the-Rhine neighborhood, disappeared; her body was discovered eight days later. A bracelet that had been stolen from the Temples was found under Storey's body. On the day of Storey's disappearance, the FBI appended Coleman to its Ten Most Wanted list as a "special addition", the 11th most wanted; Coleman was the tenth person since the initiation of the list in 1950 to merit such inclusion.

Coleman and Brown bicycled into Norwood on July 13 about 9:30 a.m. Less than three hours later, they drove away in a car belonging to Harry Walters, whom they left unconscious, and his wife, Marlene, who was beaten to death. Harry Walters survived and later testified that he and his wife had met Coleman and Brown to discuss their potential purchase of a camper, and that Coleman attacked him with a wooden candlestick. The coroner found that Marlene had been bludgeoned about 20 to 25 times. Shards of a broken soda bottle which bore Coleman's fingerprints, were found in the Walters' living room, and bloody prints made by two pairs of shoes were found in the basement. The Walters' red Plymouth Reliant, money, jewelry, and shoes were stolen. Two bicycles, clothes, and shoes not belonging to the Walters had been left behind.

=== Kentucky, return to Ohio, Illinois and Indiana ===
Two days later, the Plymouth was found abandoned in Kentucky, where Coleman and Brown had kidnapped Oline Carmical Jr., a college professor from Williamsburg, and drove back to Ohio with Carmical locked in the trunk of his car. On July 17, they abandoned this stolen vehicle in Dayton, and Carmical, who was still locked in the trunk, was rescued by authorities. Coleman and Brown returned to the home of the Gays, accosting them with guns. Reverend Gay, who at this time recognized Coleman as a wanted fugitive, asked, "Why you want to do us like that, like this?" Coleman responded: "I'm not going to kill you, but we generally kill them where we go." Coleman and Brown took their car and headed back toward Evanston, Illinois. Along the way, they stole another car in Indianapolis and kidnapped its owner, 75-year-old Eugene Scott whose body was later discovered in a ditch and had been shot repeatedly.

== Arrest and conviction ==
Three days later, on July 20, Coleman and Brown were arrested in Evanston. As they walked westward across an intersection, they passed immediately in front of a motorist who was from Coleman's neighborhood in Waukegan. The motorist drove north to a gas station and notified the police from a pay phone. The couple were soon spotted sitting on portable bleachers in empty Mason Park. As two police sergeants approached Coleman, Brown was observed walking away toward the rear of the park. Two other officers stopped Brown as she tried to exit the park, searched her, and found a gun in her purse. The pair were taken into custody without incident and transported to the Evanston police station, where both were identified by their fingerprints.

As Coleman was strip-searched, a steak knife was found between two pairs of sweat socks he was wearing. A shopping bag full of varied T-shirts and caps was found in the couple's possession; officers learned that the pair stopped every three to four blocks as they walked and changed shirts and caps. A week after their arrest, more than 50 law enforcement officials from six jurisdictions met to plan their strategy for prosecuting Coleman and Brown. Seeking the death penalty for Coleman and Brown, Michigan was quickly ruled out because it did not employ capital punishment. It was decided to give Ohio the first attempt at sentencing, with U.S. Attorney Dan K. Webb stating, "We are convinced that prosecution (in Ohio) can most quickly and most likely result in the swiftest imposition of the death penalty against Alton Coleman and Debra Brown".

The state of Ohio convicted Coleman and Brown, finding them guilty of the rape and murder of Tonnie Storey in Cincinnati and Marlene Walters in Norwood, but not for the murders of Virginia and Rachelle Temple in Toledo. Coleman and Brown were both sentenced to death. Coleman's case was sent to the U.S. Supreme Court several times between 1985 and 2002, but his numerous arguments that his conviction and death sentence were unconstitutional failed to sway the justices. However, Coleman's death sentence in relation to the Storey killing was overturned in a separate proceeding. Despite this, Coleman's death sentence in relation to the Walters murder remained upheld. In addition to the death sentences, Coleman and Brown were each sentenced to twenty years in prison for transporting their kidnapping victim Oline Carmical across a state line.

== Execution of Coleman ==
On April 25, 2002, Coleman was transferred approximately 150 miles from the Mansfield Correctional Institution to the Southern Ohio Correctional Facility in Lucasville where his execution would be carried out. Due to the scope of Coleman's crimes, the correctional facility planned to show his execution to victims and their loved ones using the prison's closed-circuit television system to accommodate a large amount of people. On April 16 Coleman's attorneys had argued that this set-up would turn his execution into a "spectator sport" and was unconstitutional because it violated an Ohio broadcasting law. But Judge Beverly Pfeiffer of the Ohio Court of Common Pleas ruled that privately showing his execution on the prison's closed-circuit television system did not qualify as a broadcast.

For his last meal, Coleman ordered a well-done filet mignon smothered with mushrooms, fried chicken breasts, a salad with French dressing, sweet potato pie topped with whipped cream, French fries, collard greens, onion rings, cornbread, broccoli with melted cheese, biscuits and gravy, and Cherry Coke. Before his execution, he released a letter apologizing for what he'd done.

On April 26, reciting Psalm 23, Alton Coleman was executed by lethal injection in the death chamber at the Southern Ohio Correctional Facility in Lucasville. Reginald Wilkinson, director of the Ohio Department of Rehabilitation and Correction, said Coleman had not directly expressed remorse for the killings, but that he had "admitted what he's done in his own convoluted way."

Coleman had received two death sentences from Ohio, and one each from Illinois and Indiana. At the time of his execution, he was the only condemned person in the United States to have death sentences in three states.

== Imprisonment of Brown ==
Brown, who was originally sentenced to be executed in Ohio for her complicity in the crimes, had her death sentence commuted to life imprisonment by Governor Richard Celeste in 1991. In commuting Brown's sentence, Celeste cited her low IQ scores, ranging from 59 to 74, and her "master-slave" relationship with Coleman influencing her actions. Brown was one of eight Ohio death row inmates (including all four of Ohio's female death row inmates) to have her sentence commuted by Celeste, a staunch opponent of capital punishment, a week before he left office.

Despite her non-violent history before the spree, Brown was initially unrepentant for her acts. During the sentencing phase of her first Ohio trial, she sent a note to the judge which read in part: "I killed the bitch and I don't give a damn. I had fun out of it." She was also given a death sentence for the murder of Tamika Turks in Indiana; however that sentence was ultimately commuted to 140 years imprisonment in 2018.

Brown is currently serving her sentence without possibility of parole at the Dayton Correctional Institution in Dayton, Ohio. She finally expressed remorse for her crimes when she apologized to the victims' families in a video in 2005.

== Racial motive ==
Some authorities believe that Coleman and Brown (both African-American) usually selected black victims because they knew they would blend in better in the black community, noting that their crimes lacked a racial motive. However, on page 184 in The Anatomy of Motive, John E. Douglas, a retired FBI profiler, states that Coleman, in the middle of a vicious sexual assault, "went into a practically incoherent tirade about how blacks were forcing him to rape and murder other blacks, as if that could somehow explain and justify his actions." Coleman and Brown left a racist slogan – all information is alleged – written in lipstick at the scene of the rape and murder of Tonnie Storey, one of their African-American victims.

== See also ==
- List of people executed in Ohio
- List of people executed in the United States in 2002
- List of serial killers in the United States

Executions carried out in Ohio
Preceded by John William Byrd Jr. February 19, 2002	Alton Coleman; April 26, 2002	Succeeded by Robert Anthony Buell September 25, 2002
Executions carried out in the United States
Preceded by Gerald Casey – Texas April 18, 2002	Alton Coleman – Ohio; April 26, 2002	Succeeded by Rodolpho Hernandez – Texas April 30, 2002
