= Torch Song (1953 film) =

1953 film by Charles Walters

- Theatrical release poster
- Directed by: Charles Walters
- Screenplay by: John Michael Hayes; Jan Lustig
- Based on: Why Should I Cry? 1949 story in The Saturday Evening Post by I.A.R. Wylie
- Produced by: Henry Berman; Sidney Franklin Jr.; Charles Schnee (executive producer; uncredited)
- Starring: Joan Crawford; Michael Wilding; Gig Young; Marjorie Rambeau
- Cinematography: Robert H. Planck
- Edited by: Albert Akst
- Music by: Adolph Deutsch
- Color process: Technicolor
- Production company: Metro-Goldwyn-Mayer
- Distributed by: Loew's, Inc.
- Release date: October 1, 1953
- Running time: 90 minutes
- Country: United States
- Language: English
- Budget: $1 million
- Box office: $1.7 million

Torch Song is a 1953 American Technicolor musical drama film distributed by Metro-Goldwyn-Mayer and starring Joan Crawford and Michael Wilding in a story about a Broadway star and her blind rehearsal pianist. The screenplay by John Michael Hayes and Jan Lustig was based upon the story "Why Should I Cry?" by I.A.R. Wylie in a 1949 issue of The Saturday Evening Post. The film was directed by Charles Walters and produced by Sidney Franklin, Jr. and Henry Berman. Crawford's singing voice was dubbed by India Adams.

Crawford lip-syncs to the recording Adams originally made for Cyd Charisse in a number discarded from the 1953 film, The Band Wagon. That's Entertainment III includes a segment presenting the two numbers side-by-side, in split screen.

The film marked Crawford's return to MGM after leaving the studio to join Warner Bros. in 1944. Her original recordings for the soundtrack, which were not used in the film, have survived and have been included in home video releases.

== Plot ==
Jenny Stewart, a Broadway diva with a fiery temper and a demanding attitude, is frustrated with the rehearsals for her new musical, "Evening with Jenny." By day, she rewrites dialogue, rearranges music and redesigns her costumes, while cutting down to size anyone who gets in her way. But alone at home, she cries herself to sleep. When her rehearsal pianist quits and is replaced by Tye Graham, Jenny is initially irked. Tye, a former critic, was blinded during the war and cannot read the changes Jenny made in the score. When Tye proposes his own modifications to the music, Jenny flies into a rage and orders director Joe Denner to fire Tye. Shortly afterward, however, Jenny and Tye's paths cross in a restaurant and Tye's candor and ability to stand up to Jenny's wisecracks make Jenny reconsider her harsh treatment of him. She asks Tye to rejoin the show and finds herself becoming interested in him, causing her to rebuff the advances of her alcoholic admirer, Cliff Willard. But Tye plays hard to get, triggering Jenny's fury.

When she learns Tye will not be accompanying the cast to Philadelphia for the show's out-of-town tryout, Jenny confronts him and demands to know why. Tye replies he doesn't like her and that her insufferable personality will one day destroy her career because producers will realize she's more trouble than she's worth. He refers to her as a "gypsy Madonna" during the ensuing argument. Later, telling her mother about the evening, Jenny repeats the "gypsy Madonna" line, which inspires her mother to dig out an old scrapbook. Jenny is stunned when she sees Tye's byline on a review of her first big show, in which he called her a "gypsy Madonna." Overwhelmed, Jenny rushes to Tye's apartment and confronts him, accusing him of using his blindness as a defense mechanism in the same way she uses her domineering personality to protect herself. At first, Tye explodes and starts to trash his place, but when he trips and falls, Jenny hurries to assist him. Tye admits Jenny is right. The two reconcile and fall into an embrace.

== Cast ==
- Joan Crawford as Jenny Stewart
  - India Adams as Jenny's dubbed singing voice
- Michael Wilding as Tye Graham
- Gig Young as Cliff Willard
- Marjorie Rambeau as Mrs. Stewart
- Henry Morgan as Joe Denner
- Dorothy Patrick as Martha
- James Todd as Philip Norton
- Eugene Loring as Gene, the Dance Director
- Paul Guilfoyle as Monty Rolfe
- Benny Rubin as Charles Maylor
- Peter Chong as Peter
- Maidie Norman as Anne
- Nancy Gates as Celia Stewart
- Chris Warfield as Chuck Peters
- Rudy Render as Singer at Party
  - Bill Lee as Singer's dubbed singing voice

== Musical numbers ==
1. "You're All the World to Me" – Danced by Crawford and Charles "Chuck" Walters
2. "Follow Me" – Sung by Crawford (dubbed by Adams)
3. "Two-Faced Woman" (outtake) – Sung by Crawford (dubbed by Adams)
4. "You Won't Forget Me" – Sung by Crawford (dubbed by Adams)
5. "Follow Me" (reprise) – Sung by Render (dubbed by Lee)
6. "Two-Faced Woman" – Sung and danced by Crawford (dubbed by Adams) and chorus
7. "Tenderly" – Sung partially by Crawford along to a recording by Adams

== Reception ==
Premiere of Torch Song at the Warner Grand Theatre, November 19, 1953.

Otis Guernsey Jr. in the New York Herald Tribune wrote "Joan Crawford has another of her star-sized roles...she is vivid and irritable, volcanic and feminine...Here is Joan Crawford all over the screen, in command, in love and in color, a real movie star in what amounts to a carefully produced one-woman show."

The Chicago Tribune wrote: "Lavish sets, pleasing music, and a good many gowns, some of them garish, fail to cover up a contrived and melodramatic story, and dialog which becomes increasingly pompous and painful as the film progresses. The picture has some excellent moments, but plain lacks an expertly written script."

The New York Times commented: "Michael Wilding is restrained but fairly effective as the pianist....But it is Miss Crawford's show and she plays it to the hilt justifiably, displaying her legs in a turn or two and a respectable amount of emotion to project both her tough but beautiful exterior and the essentially soft lovesick woman beneath it. However, despite its glitter and polish, her 'Torch Song' is strangely familiar."

The Philadelphia Inquirer was approving: "MGM has rolled out the red carpet, opened the purse strings and, what's more important, provided its prodigal daughter with a role that fits her like a pair of nylons. In return, Miss Crawford has given of her best, as an actress and as one of the screen's top-flight glamour girls....by sheer skill as an actress, she creates a full-rounded characterization of a witchy musical comedy star that is considerably more than celluloid deep....There is sharpness and variety in the writing, none of which is lost in Miss Crawford's performance."

According to MGM records, the film made $1,135,000 in the U.S. and Canada and $533,000 elsewhere, resulting in a loss of $260,000. The film is regarded as a camp classic and a possible influence on Faye Dunaway's portrayal of Crawford in Mommie Dearest.

It was parodied (as "Torchy Song") in a January 22, 1977 episode of The Carol Burnett Show.

=== Accolades ===
Rambeau was nominated for Best Actress in a Supporting Role at the 26th Academy Awards.
