= The Human Tornado =

1976 American blaxploitation film

- Theatrical release poster
- Directed by: Cliff Roquemore
- Screenplay by: Jerry Jones
- Produced by: Rudy Ray Moore
- Starring: Rudy Ray Moore; Lady Reed; Jimmy Lynch; Howard Jackson; Java; Glorya de Lani
- Cinematography: Bob Wilson; Gene Condie
- Music by: Art Wright
- Production company: Comedian International
- Distributed by: Dimension Pictures
- Release date: July 23, 1976 (Atlanta)
- Running time: 96 minutes
- Country: United States
- Language: English

The Human Tornado is a 1976 American blaxploitation film directed by Cliff Roquemore. The film is a sequel to Dolemite.

In the film, a sheriff's wife has an extramarital affair with Dolemite. Her husband orders one of his subordinates to murder her, and then frames Dolemite for her murder. Dolemite flees to California, and the sheriff follows him there.

== Plot ==
After coming off a successful comedy tour, Dolemite throws a get-together at his mansion. The party is crashed by racist police officers and they find out that the sheriff's wife is offering Dolemite money for sexual services. When the sheriff catches them red-handed, he orders his deputy to shoot them both. The deputy shoots the sheriff's wife, but is shot and killed by Dolemite, who escapes.

Dolemite and his friends kidnap a young man and decide to head to California to meet Queen Bee. There, they find out that the local mob boss, Joe Cavaletti, has kidnapped two of Queen Bee's girls, forcing her to close her business and work for him. Dolemite rescues Queen Bee and her girls and teaches his enemies a lesson, all the while being chased by the sheriff, who has pinned the murder of his own wife on Dolemite.

== Cast ==
- Rudy Ray Moore as Dolemite
- Lady Reed as "Queen Bee"
- Jimmy Lynch as Mr. Motion
- Howard Jackson as Himself
- Gloria Delaney as Annie "Hurricane Annie"
- Jerry Jones as Pete
- Sir Lady Java as Herself
- J.B. Baron as Sheriff Beatty
- Jack Kelly as Captain Ryan
- Herb Graham as Cavaletti
- Barbara Gerl as Mrs. Cavaletti
- James R. Page as Jimmy (credited as James Cromartie)
- Ernie Hudson as Bo (credited as Louis Hudson)
- Ed Montgomery as "Dough"

== Release ==
Both the Daily Variety and BoxOffice announced Dimension Pictures’ acquisition of The Human Tornado which initially was set for release on June 23, 1976. The film officially premiered at the Rialto Theatre in Atlanta, GA, on July 23, 1976. The film was later shown across twenty theaters in Los Angeles and several theaters in New York City on October 13, 1976.

== Critical reception ==
According to the American Film Institute, reviews of The Human Tornado focused on the film’s shortcomings, specifically editing and continuity. A review in The Hollywood Reporter praised certain performances by the actors Java, Herb Graham and Jerry Jones while a review in the Los Angeles Times found the film to be "dumber" than its predecessor as well as being much funnier.

== Home media ==
The film was restored and released on DVD and Blu-ray by Vinegar Syndrome on May 31, 2016.
