= Shaolin Dolemite =

- Directed by: Robert Tai
- Written by: Robert Tai; George Tan; Jimmy Lynch; Rudy Ray Moore
- Produced by: Chin Kwo Hsiao; Toby Russell; Robert Tai; George Tan
- Starring: Rudy Ray Moore; Eugene Thomas; Alexander Lou
- Cinematography: Argyle Tang
- Music by: Chow Fok Wing
- Release date: 1999
- Running time: 110 minutes
- Country: United States
- Language: English

Shaolin Dolemite is a 1999 direct-to-video film starring Rudy Ray Moore and in name, a sequel to Dolemite (1975).

The film was created by re-dubbing footage filmed for the 1986 Taiwanese kung fu film Ren zhe da (known in English as Ninja: The Final Duel).

== Production ==
Ren zhe da producer Robert Tai had reportedly filmed 10 hours of footage for the film that was cut to 90 minutes for release. Much of the footage that was not included in the release of Ren zhe da is included in Shaolin Dolemite as well as original footage of Moore observing the story of the film and making obscenity-laced comments. Other new footage includes a segment portraying Moore's long-time friend Jimmy Lynch as a Drunken Master named Sam the Spliff.

== Plot ==
The re-dubbed plotline involves Tupac (Eugene Thomas), a renegade member of the Dolemite clan, stealing a sacred bell from the Wu-Tang clan and joining forces with a group of ninjas (including the topless Ninja Ho) to defeat a Shaolin temple, which is defended by Japanese Prince Sanada (Alexander Lou); two white members of the Shabazz clan (Toby Russell and John Ladalski), a coonskin cap-wearing man named Davy Crockett (Silvio Azolini), as well as its own monks.

== See also ==
- Rudy Ray Moore
