= Disco Godfather =

- Theatrical release poster
- Directed by: J. Robert Wagoner
- Written by: Cliff Roquemore; J. Robert Wagoner
- Produced by: Rudy Ray Moore; Theodore Toney
- Starring: Rudy Ray Moore; Carol Speed
- Cinematography: Arledge Armenaki
- Edited by: Garner M.J. Morris
- Music by: Ernie Fields Jr.
- Production company: Generation International Pictures
- Distributed by: Transvue Pictures
- Release date: September 1979
- Running time: 97 minutes
- Country: United States
- Language: English

Disco Godfather (also known as The Avenging Disco Godfather) is a 1979 American action film starring Rudy Ray Moore and Carol Speed, directed by J. Robert Wagoner and released by Transvue Pictures. J. Robert Wagoner wrote and directed Disco Godfather while living in The Hotel Carver.

Commonly considered a blaxploitation film, the plot centers on Moore's character Tucker Williams, a retired cop who owns and operates a disco and tries to shut down the local angel dust (PCP) dealer after his nephew Bucky (Julius Carry) gets "whacked out" on the drug. Another PCP user's claim to have served her own baby as Easter dinner constitutes a version of the urban legend known as "The Baby-Roast."

The Disco Godfather's trademark phrase is his encouragement of the disco patrons to "Put your weight on it, put your weight on it, put your weight on it!"

The film also served as the debut of Keith David, who has an unbilled bit part as a patron in the nightclub.

== Plot ==
Tucker Williams, dressed in shiny, chest-exposing clothing, spins platters as the "Disco Godfather" at his "Blueberry Hill" discotheque during the late-1970's height of the disco era. In the audience is his nephew Bucky, a basketball star, who ignores the entreaties of his girlfriend and goes outside to score some angel dust. Bucky's girlfriend comes screaming back inside, telling Tucker that Bucky has taken drugs.

Bucky wanders back in, hallucinating, thinking people, or demons, are attacking, and he is taken to the hospital under the care of Dr. Mathis. Tucker visits him, but is told Bucky, who hallucinates losing an arm, will take a while to recover. Tucker also sees the crowded PCP-victim ward room.

One such victim is a young woman cradling a doll. Mathis relates that she says she served her own baby as holiday dinner, mistaking it for a ham. Tucker determines to wipe out the PCP menace. He visits the precinct where he used to be a policeman; he is welcomed by cop Kilroy and Lieutenant Hayes, who expresses support for the anti-drug crusade.

The mastermind behind the epidemic is revealed as Stinger Ray, a businessman who wants to run a basketball team but is also selling PCP, including "sherms" (marijuana joints dipped in PCP). He puts a hit on Tucker, but then puts a hit on his own hitmen, since he hates Tucker and wants him alive to deal with. After a disco-dancing and -skating show at Blueberry Hill, two hitmen try to shoot Tucker, but Stinger's other two hitmen, dressed as cops, come in, shoot them, and leave.

Community activists enlist Tucker's help, and a large "Attack the Wack" rally against PCP occurs. Tucker and companions start an intimidation campaign against dealers, beating them up.

He and a friend break into a party held by pimps and whores, and Tucker forces the pimps to say they'll alert him to any PCP activity. Tucker's friend finds a Saturday Night Fever album cover with cocaine on top. Tucker blows the powder all over before leaving; the partyers get down on the ground to snort it up.

A raid on a PCP den reveals no drugs; Tucker figures there is a mole in the police squad. A ruse by Tucker and Hayes reveals that Kilroy is the mole; Hayes asks him for his gun and badge. Later, Kilroy's horrified wife discovers his dead, wrist-slit body in the bathtub.

Meanwhile, casualties mount: PCP thugs murder Tucker's elderly friend Bob, an expert on Black history. Tucker's interrogation of one of them, the young man who sold Bucky PCP at the disco, reveals that Stinger is the mastermind. Following this, Tucker is briefly kidnapped by a cowboy hippie thug with a gun, who stops to whip him, but Tucker pulls back on the whip and catapults the thug into a wall.

Assaulting Stinger's building, Tucker and a friend pulverize numerous henchmen in a kung-fu fight, including an immense bald bruiser who once installed a tap on Tucker's phone before beating him up and fleeing. Tucker presses his thumbs in the bruiser's eyes, and withdraws with blood on his thumbs as the bruiser collapses.

Then Tucker confronts an even tougher, maniacally-snarling fighter, who bests him and puts him in a gas mask to force him to inhale PCP. Tucker gets the thug's neck in a leg-hold and forces him to take off the mask, but the PCP is already taking effect, and Tucker screams, waves his arms, and freaks out, envisioning himself in a coffin.

Intercutting with scenes of a group of church members praying at Mathis' clinic for a young girl incapacitated by PCP (who eventually recovers): the recovered Bucky and the police come to help Tucker. While Tucker hallucinates badly (seeing his mother, various demonic figures and/or "Angel of Death", etc.), the fleeing Stinger bumps into him; he strangles Stinger, seeing him as a red-flashing demonic figure, including animated effects. Tucker screams "You're not my mama! You're evil!"

Bucky and Hayes arrive; Bucky apologizes to Tucker for causing trouble in the first place, and Hayes says they'll take Tucker to the hospital, but the film ends with the still-disturbed Tucker loudly screaming, "Take your hands off of me! AAAAAAAAHHHHHHHH!"

== Cast ==
- Rudy Ray Moore as Tucker Williams
- Carol Speed as Noel
- Jimmy Lynch as "Sweetmeat"
- Jerry Jones as Dr. Fred Mathis
- Lady Reed as Mrs. Edwards
- Hawthorne James (as James H. Hawthorne) as Ray "Stinger Ray"
- Julius Carry (as Julius J. Carry III) as "Bucky"
- Hazel Spears as Ellen Davis
- Frank Finn as Lieutenant Frank Hayes
- Fitz Houston as Kilroy
- Pucci Jhones as "The Angel of Death"

== Critical response ==
Jason Bailey of Flavorwire opined, "the anti-drug Blaxpoitation epic with cinema’s greatest title, Avenging Disco Godfather ... Tucker pays a visit to either Bucky’s hospital or a scene from Reefer Madness; day players overact wildly as Tucker is told the story of a young, PCP-addicted mother who roasted her baby alive, and other delightful tales. ... Call it whatever you want; I call it a schlock masterpiece. PUT YOUR WEIGHT ON IT!"
