= Dolemite =

1975 film by D'Urville Martin

- Theatrical release poster
- Directed by: D'Urville Martin
- Screenplay by: Jerry Jones
- Story by: Rudy Ray Moore
- Produced by: Rudy Ray Moore
- Starring: Rudy Ray Moore; D'Urville Martin; Jerry Jones; Lady Reed; Hy Pyke; West Gale; John Kerry; Vainus Rackstraw
- Cinematography: Nicholas Josef von Sternberg
- Edited by: Rex Lipton
- Music by: Arthur G. Wright
- Distributed by: Dimension Pictures
- Release date: April 26, 1975
- Running time: 90 minutes
- Country: United States
- Language: English
- Budget: $100,000 (estimated)
- Box office: $12 million or $1.1 million

Dolemite is a 1975 American blaxploitation crime comedy film and is also the name of its principal character, played by Rudy Ray Moore, who co-wrote the film and its soundtrack. Moore, who started his career as a stand-up comedian in the late 1960s, heard a rhymed toast about an urban hero named Dolemite from a regular at the record store where he worked, and decided to adopt the persona as an alter ego in his act.

The film focuses on a professional comedian, pimp, and nightclub owner. He serves a prison sentence after being framed by dirty cops, but he is released by the governor and tasked with dealing with his hometown's illegal drug trade. He uses his prostitutes as a private army, since they are kung fu-trained martial artists.

== Plot ==
Dolemite is a pimp, comedian, and nightclub owner who is serving twenty years in prison after being set up by a rival, Willie Green, and framed by police detectives Mitchell and White, at the direction of Mayor Daley.

Released by the governor thanks to lobbying by fellow pimp "Queen Bee", Dolemite is freed in order to discover the source of the out-of-control drug problem in the "Fourth Ward" of the city, and take revenge on the corruption that put him in prison.

He rekindles his reputation on the streets while trying to get back his "Total Experience" club from the hands of Willie Green. He enlists the help of Reverend Gibbs, a Black nationalist preacher hoarding guns for a revolution, and his own army of kung fu-trained prostitutes to settle the various scores, while an undercover FBI agent, Blakely, lurks in the shadows, following the proceedings and supporting Dolemite's quest.

Dolemite gives $50,000 to Green's associates to pay Green off, and takes over the Total Experience club once again. After Dolemite performs a comedy routine one night at the club, with Green in attendance, Green demands interest of $100,000 from Dolemite, or else suggests that he and Dolemite become business partners. Dolemite refuses and goes to leave, and Green fires a gun in his direction, causing the club to erupt into chaos. Fights break out between Dolemite and his prostitutes and Green and his associates. Dolemite defeats Green but is severely wounded, and Blakely arrives to shoot Green dead.

After almost being shot by a prostitute, Mayor Daley flees his home with a large sum of money, with Blakely in pursuit. The mayor attempts to escape in an airplane, but Blakely fatally shoots him. Dolemite is recovering from his injuries in a hospital, in room 2218, when men arrive to assassinate him. The men are led to believe that Dolemite is being kept in room 2110, allowing Dolemite and Blakely to surprise and defeat them. Detective Mitchell appears on the scene and Blakely has him arrested for his involvement in the conspiracy against Dolemite.

== Cast ==
- Rudy Ray Moore as Dolemite
- Lady Reed as "Queen Bee"
- D'Urville Martin as Willie Green
- West Gale as Reverend Gibbs
- John Kerry as Detective Mitchell
- Jerry Jones as Blakely
- Hy Pyke as Mayor Daley
- Vainus Rackstraw as "Creeper"

== Production ==
Moore first developed the character of Dolemite in his stand-up comedy routines, and the character later appeared on Moore's 1970 debut album, Eat Out More Often, which reached the top 25 on the Billboard 200. He released several more comedy albums using this persona. In 1973, Moore decided to create a film about Dolemite, paying for most of the production out of his own pocket, and using many of his friends, student filmmakers, and fellow comedians as cast and crew. The film was directed by D'Urville Martin, who appears as the villain Willie Green.

Production started in January, 1974, and continued for over a year - starting and stopping - as funding would allow. Filming of interiors was primarily done at the then-closed Dunbar Hotel in Los Angeles, with additional exterior scenes being filmed in the Baldwin Hills area and University Park.

== Release ==
=== Critical reception ===
On review aggregator Rotten Tomatoes, the film holds an approval rating of 60% based on 15 reviews, with an average score of 5/10. On Metacritic, the film received a score of 67 based on 6 reviews, indicating "generally favorable" reviews.

=== Home media ===
Dolemite was released on VHS in 1987 by Xenon Home Video (#X-006), 91 minutes. The soundtrack was released on CD by Relapse Records in 2006, 31 years after the film's release and long after the soundtrack had gone out of print.

Dolemite was released to DVD on September 13, 2005, by Xenon Pictures and also as part of a boxed set (The Dolemite Collection) on the same date. A widescreen, high definition remastered version, from an original print of the film, was released on Blu-ray disc on April 26, 2016, by Vinegar Syndrome. The prior VHS and DVD releases from the early-1990s were incorrectly transferred with an open matte, which revealed the boom mic at the top of the frame frequently (with the correct matte in a theatrical presentation, this area would have been covered). Over the years, the appearance of the boom mic due to the oversight during the VHS and DVD transfer was the source of amusement by viewers, and in acknowledgement of this, the Blu-ray also features an open matte version as an alternate "boom mic" presentation.

== Legacy ==
A sequel, The Human Tornado, was released in 1976. A second sequel, The Return of Dolemite, was released in 2002 and was later re-titled The Dolemite Explosion for DVD release. A quasi-sequel, Shaolin Dolemite, starring Rudy Ray Moore as Monk Ru-Dee, was released in 1999.

The action comedy movie Black Dynamite (2009) parodies Dolemite and other blaxploitation films.

A biographical film about Moore and the making of Dolemite, titled Dolemite Is My Name and starring Eddie Murphy as Rudy Ray Moore, was released theatrically and on Netflix in October 2019.

== See also ==
- List of blaxploitation films
