= Rudy Ray Moore =

American comedian, singer, actor and filmmaker (1927–2008)

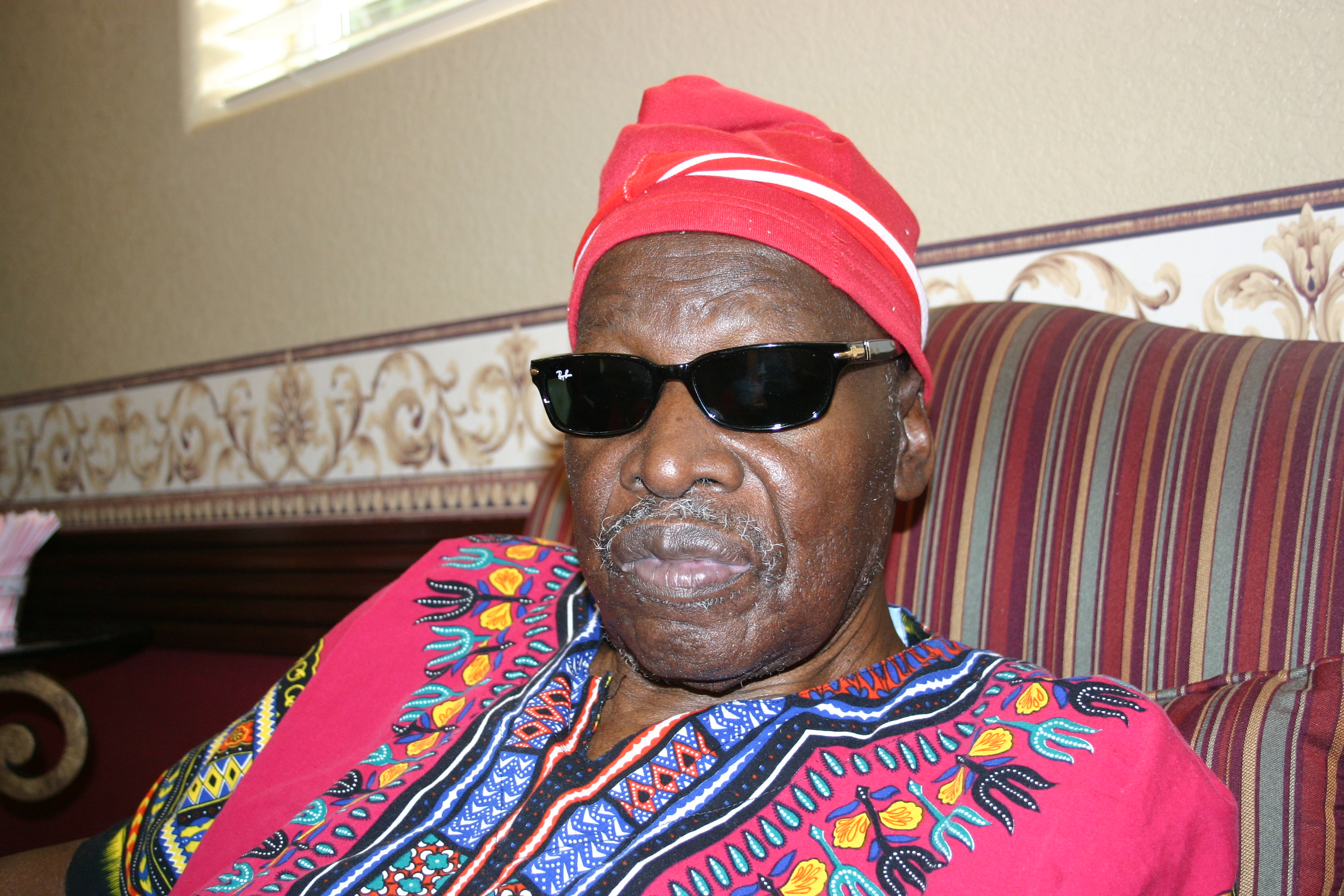
- Moore in 2007
- Born: Rudolph Frank Moore; March 17, 1927; Fort Smith, Arkansas, U.S.
- Died: October 19, 2008 (aged 81); Akron, Ohio, U.S.
- Occupations: Actor; comedian; singer; filmmaker
- Musical career
- Genres: R&B; soul
- Instrument: Vocals
- Years active: 1948–2008
- Website: rudyraymoore.com

Rudolph Frank Moore (March 17, 1927 – October 19, 2008), known as Rudy Ray Moore, was an American comedian, singer, actor, and filmmaker. He created the character Dolemite, the pimp from the 1975 film Dolemite and its sequels, The Human Tornado (1976) and The Return of Dolemite (2002). The persona was developed during his early comedy records. The recordings often featured Moore delivering profanity-filled rhyming poetry, which later earned him the nickname the "Godfather of Rap". Eddie Murphy portrayed Moore in the 2019 biopic Dolemite Is My Name.

== Early life ==
Moore was born and raised in the Johnson House on 1400 North 12th Street in Fort Smith, Arkansas, and eventually moved to Akron, Ohio, and then Milwaukee. In Milwaukee, he preached in churches and worked as a nightclub dancer. He returned to Akron, working in clubs as a singer, dancer, and comedian, often appearing in character as Prince DuMarr. He joined the US Army and served in an entertainment unit in Germany, where he was nicknamed the Harlem Hillbilly for singing country songs in an R&B style. He developed an interest in comedy in the Army after expanding on a singing performance for other servicemen.

After his honorable discharge he lived in Seattle and then Los Angeles, where he continued to work in clubs and was discovered by record producer Dootsie Williams. He recorded rhythm and blues songs for the Federal, Cash, Ball, Kent, and Imperial labels between 1955 and 1962, and released his first comedy albums, Below the Belt (1961), The Beatnik Scene (1962), and A Comedian Is Born (1964).

== Career ==
=== Dolemite records and wider acclaim ===
By his own account, Moore was working at the world famous Dolphin's of Hollywood record store in Los Angeles in 1970 when he began hearing obscene stories of "Dolemite" recounted by a local man named Rico. Moore recorded a number of street poets, including Big Brown who, before he moved to Los Angeles, had been an influence on Bob Dylan, among other artists, while living in Greenwich Village. (Dylan said Brown's poetry was the best poetry he had ever heard.) In 1973, Moore produced Brown's album, The First Man of Poetry, Big Brown: Between Heaven and Hell.

According to Moore, the genesis for his decision to develop the "Dolemite" character came when he invited Rico into Dolphin's, where he let him perform:

Rico, you do "Dolemite", I'm gonna give you some money for soup. He did "Dolemite" in the middle of the floor in the store I was working and the people just rolled. So I thought then, he's not a professional; I'm a professional comedian. What if I did "Dolemite"? Sure enough, I invited him to my house, give him a little reefer and some wine. He put "Dolemite" on tape, I recorded it, the rest is history.

Moore began recording the stories, and assumed the role of "Dolemite" in his club act and on recordings. In 1970–71 he recorded three albums of material, Eat Out More Often, This Pussy Belongs To Me, and The Dirty Dozens, where "with jazz and R&B musicians playing in the background, [Moore] would recite raunchy, sexually explicit rhymes that often had to do with pimps, prostitutes, players, and hustlers."

Moore was influenced by more mainstream comedians such as Redd Foxx and Richard Pryor, as well as by traditions such as the Dozens. The recordings were usually made in Moore's apartment, with friends in attendance to give a party atmosphere. The album covers and contents were often too racy to be put on display in record stores, but the records became popular through word of mouth and were highly successful in Black American communities, where his "warped wit and anti-establishment outlook" were embraced.

=== Dolemite movie and later success ===
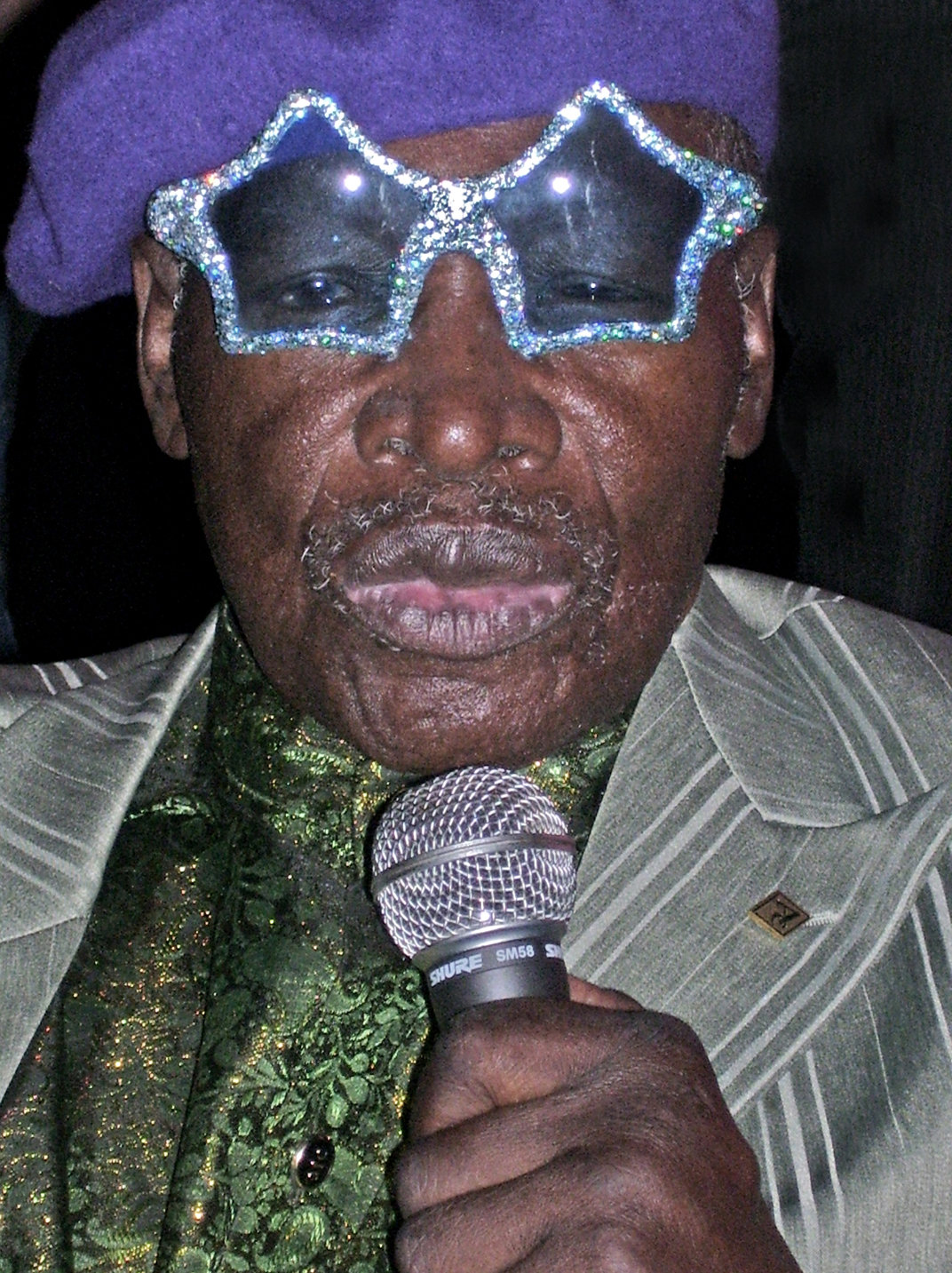
Moore in 2007

Moore spent most of his earnings from the records to finance the movie Dolemite, which started filming in January, 1974. It was released and distributed nationally beginning in April 1975, and has been described as "one of the great blaxploitation movies" of the 1970s. The character was "the ultimate ghetto hero: a bad dude, profane, skilled at kung-fu, dressed to kill and hell-bent on protecting the community from evil menaces. He was a pimp with a kung-fu-fighting clique of prostitutes and he was known for his sexual prowess."

The film was successful and was followed by The Human Tornado, The Monkey Hustle, and Petey Wheatstraw: The Devil's Son-in-Law. Moore continued to release albums that appealed to his enduring fanbase through the 1970s and 1980s, but little of his work reached a white audience. His "rapid-fire rhyming salaciousness exceeded the wildest excesses" of Foxx and Pryor, and his highly explicit style kept him off television and major films. At the same time, Moore often spoke in his church and regularly took his mother to the National Baptist Convention. He said that: "I wasn't saying dirty words just to say them... It was a form of art, sketches in which I developed ghetto characters who cursed. I don't want to be referred to as a dirty old man, rather a ghetto expressionist."

=== Later career ===
In 1990, Moore appeared on Big Daddy Kane's album Taste of Chocolate and Eric B. & Rakim's music video for "In The Ghetto". Four years later, he appeared on Method Man's album Tical and 2 Live Crew's album Back at Your Ass for the Nine-4. 2 Live Crew attributed their use of obscenity-laden lyrics to Moore's act. After appearing on a 1995 episode of Martin titled "The Players Came Home", he reprised the Dolemite character for the intro of Busta Rhymes' album When Disaster Strikes... Snoop Dogg's 1999 album No Limit Top Dogg, and Ol' Dirty Bastard‘s 1999 music video "Got Your Money“, in which the rapper was digitally inserted into scenes of Dolemite. He again reprised Dolemite in the 2000 film Big Money Hustlas, a film created by and starring the rap-rock group Insane Clown Posse. In 2001, Moore was a featured guest in the intro of Busta Rhymes' album Genesis. Five years later, Moore voice-acted in the show Sons of Butcher, as Rudy, and Joseph in season 2. Moore reprised the character Petey Wheatstraw on the 2008 song "I Live for the Funk", which featured Blowfly and Daniel Jordan. It marked the first time Blowfly and Moore collaborated on the same record together, as well as the 30-year anniversary of the movie Petey Wheatstraw; it was also the final recording Moore made before his death.

== Personal life and death ==
Moore never married. His long-time manager, Donald Randell , and entertainer Stanton Z. LaVey, a friend of Moore's, said in 2019 that Moore was "very much bisexual, if not gay", and that his Dolemite persona helped cover it up.

On October 19, 2008, Moore died in Rittman, Ohio, near Akron, of complications from diabetes.

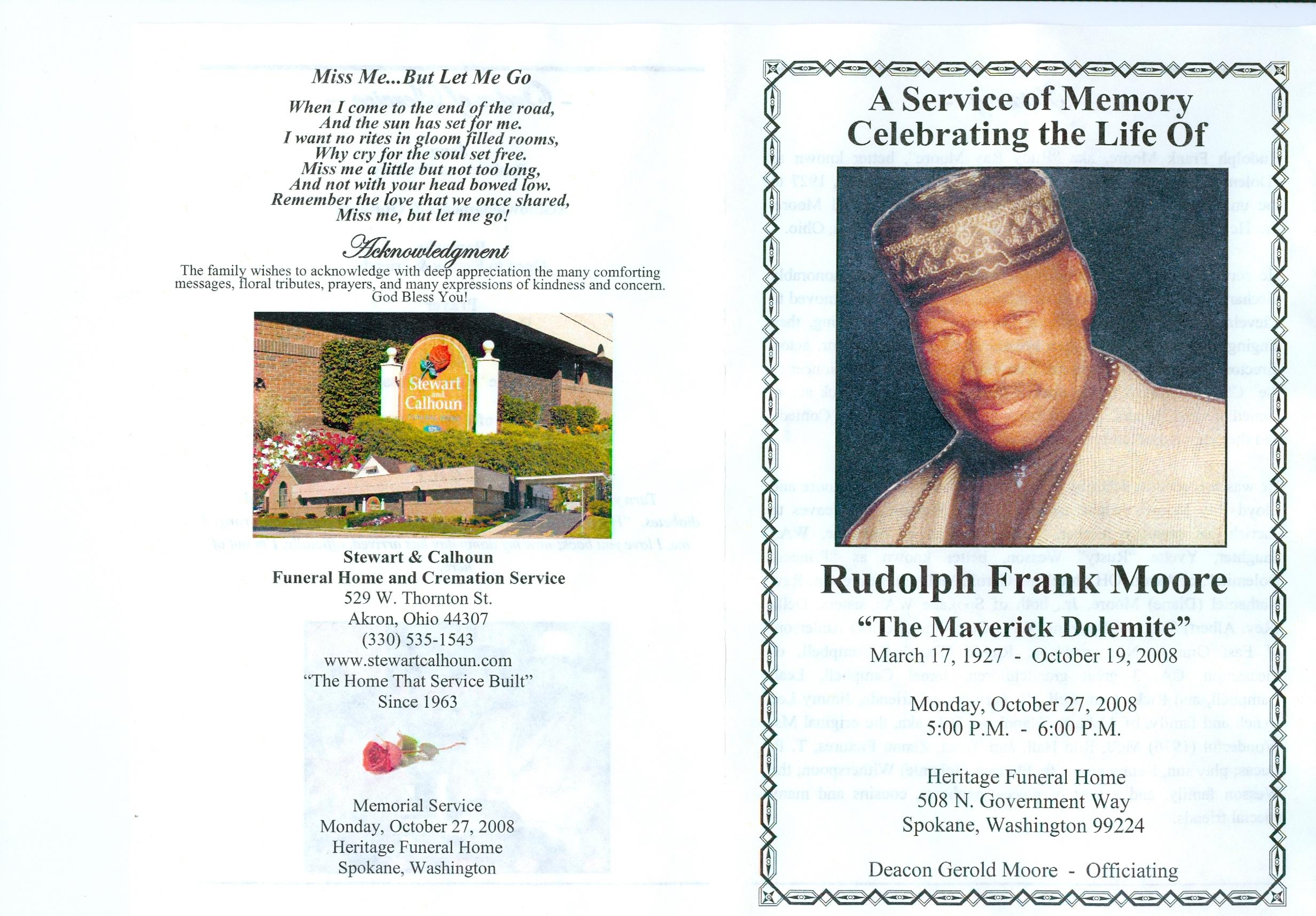
Rudy Ray Moore Funeral Program

== Legacy ==
He came to be regarded as a major influence by many later rap stars. Snoop Dogg said that "without Rudy Ray Moore, there would be no Snoop Dogg, and that's for real."

On June 7, 2018, it was announced that Craig Brewer would direct Dolemite Is My Name from a script by Scott Alexander and Larry Karaszewski with Netflix producing and distributing and Eddie Murphy starring as Moore. Later that month, the rest of the principal cast was announced. In July 2018, Chris Rock and Ron Cephas Jones joined the cast. Principal photography began on June 12, 2018. In August 2019, the trailer was released. The film premiered at the Toronto International Film Festival on September 7, 2019, and received a limited release on October 4, 2019, before digital streaming on October 25, 2019. At the 77th Golden Globe Awards, the film was nominated for Best Motion Picture – Musical or Comedy and Murphy was nominated for the Golden Globe Award for Best Actor – Motion Picture Musical or Comedy.

In January 2022, a detailed biography, Thank You for Letting Me Be Myself: The Authorized Biography of Rudy Ray Moore aka Dolemite by Mark Jason Murray, was released.

== Discography ==
=== Albums ===
Comedy

- Below the Belt (1959)
- Beatnik Scene (1962)
- A Comedian Is Born (1964)
- Let's Come Together (1970, recorded 1967)
- Eat Out More Often (1970) (Kent KST 001)
- This Pussy Belongs to Me (1971) (Kent KST 002) – with "The Signifying Monkee"
- Dolemite for President (1972)
- Merry Christmas, Baby
- The Cockpit – with "Petey Wheatstraw – The Devil's Son-in-Law"
- Return of Dolemite (featuring The Grunts & Groans of Love)
- The Sensuous Black Man – by "The Prince"
- Zodiac
- I Can't Believe I Ate the Whole Thing
- Jokes by Redd Foxx
- Live in Concert
- The Player—The Hustler
- House Party: Dirty Dozens Vol. 1
- The Streaker
- Dolemite Is Another Crazy Nigger
- Sweet Peeter Jeeter
- Close Encounter of the Sex Kind
- Good-Ole Big Ones
- Hip-Shakin' Papa
- Greatest Hits (1995)
- This Ain't No White Christmas
- Raw, Rude, and Real—More Greatest Hits
- Phantom Surfers – XXX Party (2000)
- 21st-Century Dolemite (2002)
- Genius of Rudy Ray Moore
- Dolemite for President — Special Edition (2008)
- 50 Years of Cussing (2009)
- 50 Years of Cussing, Vol. 2 (2019)

Music

- The Turning Point (1972)
- Hully Gully Fever (2000; compilation)

=== Singles ===
- "Step It Up and Go" (King Records)
- "Below the Belt" (Dooto)
- "The Roosevelt" (Dooto)
- "Let's Come Together"
- "My Soul" – The Seniors (Ball 001)
- "Rally in the Valley" (Vermont 105-45)
- "Hully Gully Papa" (Case Records 1006)

== Filmography ==
Year	Title	Role	Notes
1975	Dolemite	Dolemite	
1976	The Human Tornado	Dolemite	
1976	The Monkey Hu$tle	Goldie	
1977	Petey Wheatstraw	Petey	
1979	Disco Godfather	Tucker Williams	
1982	Penitentiary II	Husband	
1994	The Legend of Dolemite	Himself	Short
1995	Murder Was the Case: The Movie	Dolemite	Short
1996	Martin	Dolemite	Episode: "The Players Came Home"
1997	Violent New Breed	Pastor Williams	Direct-to-video
1997	B*A*P*S	Nate	
1997	Fakin' da Funk	Larry	
1999	Shaolin Dolemite	Monk Ru-Dee	Direct-to-video
1999	Jackie's Back	Bad Guy	TV
2000	Big Money Hustlas	Dolemite	Direct-to-video
2000	Shoe Shine Boys		
2002	The Return of Dolemite	Dolemite	aka The Dolemite Explosion
2002	Live At Wetlands N.Y.C.	Himself	September 2000 music performance and comedy at Wetlands in New York City
2002	Rude	Himself	1982 comedy performance at Blueberry Hill in Los Angeles
2003	The Watermelon Heist	Angel of Death	
2003	The Legend of Dolemite: Bigger & Badder	Himself	
2005	Vampire Assassin		
2006–2007	Sons of Butcher	Rudy the Psychic Janitor, Joseph	TV series Season 2, 4 episodes
2007	A Stupid Movie for Jerks	Cop	
2009	It Came from Trafalgar	Dangerous Dan	Posthumous release, (final film role)
2019	Dolemite Is My Name	Himself	Archive footage; posthumous release
