= Norman Wexler =

American screenwriter, script doctor and playwright

- Born: August 16, 1926; New Bedford, Massachusetts, U.S.
- Died: August 23, 1999 (aged 73); Washington, D.C., U.S.
- Education: Harvard University
- Occupation: Screenwriter

Norman Wexler (August 16, 1926 – August 23, 1999) was an American screenwriter. He was a two-time Academy Award nominee, Best Original Screenplay for Joe (1970) and Best Adapted Screenplay for Serpico (1973).

== Early life and education ==
A New Bedford, Massachusetts native and 1944 Central High School graduate in Detroit, Wexler attended Harvard University before moving to New York in 1951.

== Career ==
Wexler wrote the screenplays for several hit films, most notably Joe, Serpico, Mandingo and Saturday Night Fever. He received Oscar nominations for Joe and Serpico. According to Bob Zmuda, Saturday Night Fever made Wexler a wealthy man. He was a much sought-after script doctor, reworking the scripts for Lipstick and The Fan.

Wexler also was a serious and accomplished playwright. Several of his plays were produced off-Broadway and in regional theaters. His play The Rope was produced at Cafe La MaMa on New York, Red's My Color, What's Yours? won the Cleveland Playhouse Award, and his most recent work Forgive Me, Forgive Me Not was staged in Los Angeles in 1996, winning the Julie Harris Playwright Award, three years before his death.

== Health, personal life, and character inspirations ==
He was reported to have suffered from severe mental illness, reportedly bipolar disorder, and was arrested in 1972 for threatening to shoot President Richard Nixon.

In the book Andy Kaufman Revealed, Bob Zmuda, Kaufman's friend and writer, relates his experiences working as an assistant for an extremely eccentric, Academy Award-nominated screenwriter, prone to pulling stunts that ranged from the bizarre to the profane. Zmuda refers to the man by the alias Mr X. Mr X's wild antics and boorish behavior are said to have been a major influence in creating Andy Kaufman's iconic alter-ego, the obnoxious lounge lizard Tony Clifton. Zmuda does not confirm Mr. X's identity in the book. However, on the WTF with Marc Maron podcast, he confirmed the long-standing rumor that it was Wexler.

His last manic episode, from November 1998 to February 1999, took a toll on his health. Early in the morning of August 23, 1999, Wexler died of a heart attack at age 73.

== Filmography ==
Year	Title	Director	Notes
1970	Joe	John G. Avildsen	
1973	Serpico	Sidney Lumet	with Waldo Salt
1975	Mandingo	Richard Fleischer	
1976	Drum	Steve Carver	
1977	Saturday Night Fever	John Badham	
1983	Staying Alive	Sylvester Stallone	with Stallone
1986	Raw Deal	John Irvin	with Gary DeVore

== Awards and nominations ==
Award	Year	Category	Work	Result
Academy Award	1971	Best Original Screenplay	Joe	Nominated
Academy Award	1974	Best Adapted Screenplay	Serpico	Nominated
Edgar Award	1974	Best Motion Picture Screenplay	Serpico	Nominated
Writers Guild of America Award	1974	Best Adapted Screenplay	Serpico	Won
Writers Guild of America Award	1978	Best Original Screenplay	Saturday Night Fever	Nominated
