= Drum (1976 film) =

1976 film by Steve Carver

- Theatrical release poster
- Directed by: Steve Carver
- Screenplay by: Norman Wexler
- Based on: Drum (1962 novel) by Kyle Onstott
- Produced by: Ralph B. Serpe
- Starring: Warren Oates; Isela Vega; Ken Norton; Pam Grier; Yaphet Kotto; John Colicos; Fiona Lewis; Paula Kelly; Brenda Sykes
- Cinematography: Lucien Ballard
- Edited by: Carl Kress
- Music by: Charlie Smalls
- Production company: Dino De Laurentiis Corporation
- Distributed by: United Artists
- Release date: July 30, 1976
- Running time: 110 minutes
- Country: United States
- Language: English

Drum is a 1976 American historical melodrama film directed by Steve Carver. It is the sequel to Mandingo (1975), and is based on Kyle Onstott's 1962 novel. Ken Norton returns from the first film, albeit in a different role. The film also stars Warren Oates, Pam Grier, Yaphet Kotto, John Colicos, Fiona Lewis, Paula Kelly and Brenda Sykes

The film was released by United Artists in July 1976. It received generally negative reviews.

== Plot ==
Drum is born in Havana to a white prostitute, who raises him with her black lesbian lover. Drum grows up to be a fighter and is often forced to bare-knuckle-box other slaves to the brink of death for the entertainment of the owners, one of whom is a gay Frenchman named Bernard DeMarigny. DeMarigny wants to have sex with Drum. His advances are rejected by the slave and DeMarigny vows revenge against Drum. Drum and his friend Blaise are eventually sold to Louisiana plantation owner Hammond Maxwell, and are taken to his plantation to work. Another slave, Regine, is purchased by Maxwell and is taken to the plantation as his bed-wench.

After arriving at Maxwell's plantation, Regine is set up in the bedroom above Hammond. Augusta Chauvel, Maxwell's fiancé, is jealous and has other plans for Regine. Maxwell's daughter Sophie wants sex with Drum, but he won't for fear of being killed. Sophie also attempts to seduce Blaise, and after being rejected, tells her father that Blaise has raped her. Blaise is put in chains and Maxwell decides that he must be castrated for the alleged rape. Sophie is sent off to boarding school after getting caught showing her body to Blaise while he is chained.

Meanwhile, a dinner party has been arranged to celebrate the engagement of Maxwell and Chauvel. DeMarigny has been invited to attend the celebration and the guests eventually discuss the best way to castrate a slave. During the party, Drum frees Blaise and the slaves start a revolt at the engagement party. An agreement was made that they would not shoot Blaise; while Drum is attempting to deescalate the revolt, DeMarigny shoots Blaise. Drum turns and grabs hold of DeMarigny's privates and rips them off, telling the slaves to take the house and a siege begins. Both slaves and slave holders are killed during the battle, but Maxwell and Chauvel are saved by Drum. Maxwell tells Drum he must flee; if Drum is captured, Maxwell will be compelled by social expectations to kill him. Chauvel tells Maxwell that all he has to do is tell the slave holders that Drum was loyal and they won't kill him, but Maxwell says he still must kill Drum to maintain discipline over the other slaves. Drum then runs from the plantation.

== Cast ==
- Warren Oates as Hammond Maxwell
- Pam Grier as Regine
- Ken Norton as Drum
- Isela Vega as Marianna
- Yaphet Kotto as Blaise
- John Colicos as Bernard DeMarigny
- Fiona Lewis as Augusta Chauvel
- Paula Kelly as Rachel
- Royal Dano as Zeke Montgomery
- Lillian Hayman as Lucretia Borgia
- Rainbeaux Smith as Sophie Maxwell
- Brenda Sykes as Calinda
- Clay Tanner as Mr. Holcomb
- Lila Finn as Mrs. Holcomb

== Production ==
The film was initially being directed by Burt Kennedy, but he was replaced due to creative differences with the executive producer, Dino De Laurentiis. Steve Carver then took over as director with only four days of preparation, the film's print made use of material filmed by both Kennedy and Carver. According to Carver, Kennedy had only shot the opening sequence in Puerto Rico. Embarrassed by the script, Kennedy walked off the picture. Carver stated that "a lot of the actors followed him off of the picture". Carver then had to recast several roles and brought on "Pam Grier, Royal Dano and Brenda Sykes and several others".

== Release ==
Paramount Pictures was supposed to distribute the film, but backed out because they thought De Laurentis had made it X-rated. He finally settled for a "slightly laundered version", which he pitched to United Artists, who took over distribution of the movie.

=== Home media ===
A restored edition of Drum was released on DVD and blu-ray in 2014, which includes an audio commentary by director Steve Carver.

== Reception ==
On review aggregator Rotten Tomatoes, the film holds a score of 11% based on nine reviews, with an average rating of 4.5/10. Vincent Canby of The New York Times wrote: "Life on the old plantation was horrendous, I agree, but movies like this are less interested in information than titillation, which, in turn, reflects contemporary obsessions rather more than historical truths." Film critic Richard Dyer was blunt in his review, stating, "the film operates on the intellectual level of a comic–book; the emotional level of a horny, dirty–minded adolescent; the moral level of a baboon."

Arne Sylevolde of the Los Angeles Free Press wrote that "many of the escapades which made the book impossible to put down are softened, but the raw story of degradation and oppression of slaves, the sensual couplings of mixed races and the action in the fight sequences remains in large enough does to capture the overall feeling of the book." Film critic Kevin Thomas said that the film "is more trash from the same barrel Mandingo came from ... Pam Grier is wasted in a tiny nothing part beneath her, and Colicos is pure Southern fried ham; it is one of those pictures that reminds you there can always be worse."

Film critic Richard Corliss said "every inhabitant of the antebellum plantation, whether black or white, slave or free, is drawn in caricatures broad enough to do a pay–toilet artist proud; like the old Marx Brothers movies, there are pauses after certain lines of dialogue for the audience to fill with their laughter and screams, the huge, mostly black crowd I saw Drum with loved the movie, and were much more entertaining than the film itself; they should go on tour with it."

In her review for Time Out, Verina Glaessner opined "the movie ... remains unfocused; much of the blame rests with the chaotic and clumsy script; an incoherent introductory sequence takes the Onstott cruderies, which Fleischer was scrupulous in making a function of the characters themselves, and gives them the status of a voice-over, thereby fatally altering the audience's relationship to what is on the screen." Film critic Nick Pinkerton said the film has "wild inconsistencies in tone and texture; the flimsy, tacky set is indifferently bathed in a flat wash of light, with nary a tough of adumbration to be found; it's palette is tackier than whorehouse wallpaper."

== See also ==
- List of films featuring slavery
- List of American films of 1976
- List of LGBTQ-related films of 1976
