= Mandingo (film) =

1975 film directed by Richard Fleischer

- Theatrical release poster
- Directed by: Richard Fleischer
- Screenplay by: Norman Wexler
- Based on: Mandingo (1957 novel) by Kyle Onstott; Mandingo (1961 play) by Jack Kirkland
- Produced by: Dino De Laurentiis
- Starring: James Mason; Susan George; Perry King; Richard Ward; Brenda Sykes; Ken Norton
- Cinematography: Richard H. Kline
- Edited by: Frank Bracht
- Music by: Maurice Jarre
- Production company: Dino De Laurentiis Company
- Distributed by: Paramount Pictures
- Release dates: May 7, 1975 (New York City, premiere); July 25, 1975 (U.S.)
- Running time: 127 minutes
- Country: United States
- Language: English

Mandingo is a 1975 American historical drama film directed by Richard Fleischer and produced by Dino De Laurentiis for Paramount Pictures. It is adapted by Norman Wexler from Kyle Onstott's 1957 novel and its 1961 stage adaptation by Jack Kirkland. The film stars James Mason, Susan George, Perry King, Richard Ward, Brenda Sykes, and Ken Norton in his film debut. It concerns the Atlantic slave trade in the Antebellum South.

In the film, cruel slave owner Warren Maxwell (Mason) orders his son Hammond (King) to marry a white woman to produce grandchildren with no black ancestry. Hammond marries Blanche (George), his cousin, who becomes jealous that he pays more attention to his Black lover Ellen (Sykes) than to his wife, leading Blanche to force the fighting slave Mede (Norton) into a sexual relationship with her. The title refers to the Mandinka people, who are referred to as "Mandingos", and described as being good slaves for fighting matches. The word is also used as a pejorative to describe a hypersexual Black man.

Upon initial release, Mandingo received negative reviews. However, retrospectively, the film's reception became much more favorable. It has been variously seen as a big-budget exploitation film made by a major studio, a serious film about American slavery, examining historical horrors committed against African Americans, or as a work of camp. Critic Robin Wood described it as, "The greatest film about race ever made in Hollywood."

Despite the film's poor critical reception, it was a commercial success and was followed by a sequel, Drum (1976), which starred Norton as a different character and Warren Oates as Hammond.

== Plot ==
In the Deep South of the United States before the American Civil War, Falconhurst is a run-down plantation owned by widower Warren Maxwell and largely run by his son, Hammond. One of Hammond's female slaves, Pearl, reaches puberty and Hammonds duty as her master is to have her first time sexual intercourse as she is a virgin. Later, Hammond has his own regular sex slave, Dite, who he recently learns he has just impregnated. Hammond and his cousin, Charles, visit a plantation where both men are given Black women out of hospitality. Hammond chooses Ellen, who is a virgin. Both she and Hammond watch as Charles abuses and rapes the other woman, with Charles claiming that she likes it. Hammond asks Ellen if this is true, and she says no. Hammond then sleeps with Ellen.

Warren Maxwell pressures him to marry, so Hammond chooses his cousin, Blanche, who is desperate to get out of her house to escape her brother Charles. It is implied that she had an incestuous relationship with Charles. After their wedding night, Hammond is sure that she is not a virgin—a claim Blanche denies. On their way back from their honeymoon, Hammond returns to the plantation where Ellen is kept and purchases her as his sex slave. Eventually, he comes to genuinely care for her.

Meanwhile, Hammond purchases a Mandingo slave named Ganymede. Nicknamed "Mede", the slave works for Hammond as a prize-fighter. He is forced to soak in a large cauldron of very hot salt water to ostensibly toughen his skin. Hammond also breeds Mede with Pearl, even though Pearl is a blood relation of Mede's. Hammond makes a great deal of money betting on Mede's fights.

Rejected by Hammond, Blanche becomes a slovenly alcoholic who does nothing all day long. While Hammond is on a business trip alone, Blanche discovers Ellen is pregnant. Correctly assuming the baby is Hammond's, Blanche beats Ellen. Ellen flees, but falls down some stairs, and miscarries. Hammond (who had promised Ellen that her baby would be freed), returns to Falconhurst and discovers Ellen lost the baby. Threatened with bodily harm by Warren, Ellen does not tell him how she miscarried. Hammond gives Ellen a pair of ruby earrings, which she wears while serving an evening meal. Hammond gave the matching necklace to Blanche, who becomes enraged to find Ellen being publicly favored by Hammond.

Hammond leaves on another business trip, taking Ellen with him. A drunken Blanche demands that Mede come to her bedroom. Although the other slaves attempt to stop him, Mede does as he is ordered. Blanche says she will accuse Mede of rape if he does not have sex with her, so he is forced to spend the night with her, which he does on several occasions.

Hammond returns to the plantation. A great deal of time has passed since Hammond and Blanche's marriage, and Warren Maxwell is eager for a grandchild. Sensing that the marriage is troubled, Warren locks Hammond and Blanche in a room together and refuses to let them out until they reconcile. They appear to do so.

A short time later, Blanche announces she is pregnant, but when the baby is born, it is clear the child is mixed race. To avoid a scandal, the child, on doctor's orders, is allowed to bleed to death from its umbilical cord. Sickened at Blanche's sexual indiscretion, Hammond asks the doctor if he has the poison he uses on old slaves and horses. He pours the poison into a toddy for Blanche. An outraged Hammond seeks out Mede, intending to kill him despite Ellen's plea to spare Mede. As Hammond attempts to force Mede into a boiling cauldron of water, Mede tries to tell him that Blanche blackmailed him into having sex with her. Hammond shoots Mede twice with a rifle and the second shot throws Mede into the boiling water. Hammond uses a pitchfork to drown Mede. In a fit of fury, the slave Agamemnon picks up the rifle and aims it at Hammond. When Warren calls him a "crazy nigger" and demands that he put the gun down, the slave shoots and kills Warren. As he runs away, Hammond kneels helpless next to Warren's lifeless body.

== Cast ==
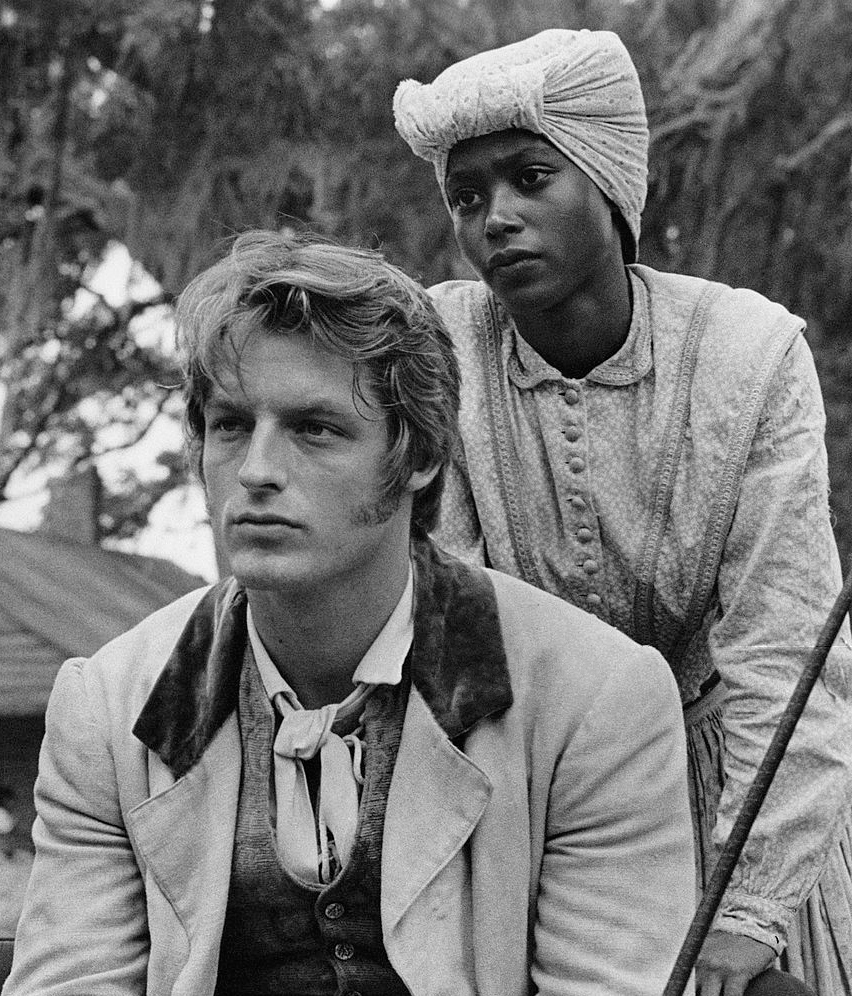
Perry King and Brenda Sykes in Mandingo

Credits from the AFI Catalog of Feature Films.

- James Mason as Warren Maxwell
- Susan George as Blanche Maxwell
- Perry King as Hammond Maxwell
- Richard Ward as Agamemnon
- Brenda Sykes as Ellen
- Ken Norton as Mede
- Lillian Hayman as Lucretia Borgia
- Roy Poole as Doc Redfield
- Ji-Tu Cumbuka as Cicero
- Paul Benedict as Brownlee
- Beatrice Winde as Lucy
- Ben Masters as Charles Woodford
- Debbi Morgan as Dite
- Irene Tedrow as Mrs. Redfield
- Louis Turenne as De Veve
- Earl Maynard as Babouin
- Stocker Fontelieu as Wilson

== Production ==
=== Development ===
The original novel sold over 4.5 million copies. A stage adaptation by Jack Kirkland had a brief run on Broadway in 1961. Prior to Dino De Laurentiis obtaining the film rights, fellow Italian producer Maleno Malenotti intended to shoot the film in Brazil in 1969, with Damiano Damiani attached to direct.

Executive producer Ralph B. Serpe said during filming that the movie was:

A human, sociological story that's going to bring about a better understanding between the races ... We're faithful to the story of the book but not the spirit. I mean, the book's hackwork, isn't it? It's almost repulsive. A lot of people have read it, but they read it for the wrong reasons. It's really a story of love. We had the script rewritten three times. ... I hated that ending in the book where the guy boils the slave down and pours the soup over his wife's grave. I mean, we have the slave boiled but we cut out the part where he pours the soup on his grave. He just ... pulls away. And we know that tomorrow there's going to be a lot of trouble. It's really a very beautiful ending.

=== Casting ===
Early in development, James Cagney was attached to play Warren and Muhammad Ali (then known as Cassius Clay) was offered, but declined, the role of Mede. Charlton Heston turned down the role of Warren and the role of Hammond was rejected by Timothy Bottoms, Jan Michael Vincent, Jeff Bridges and Beau Bridges. Boxer Ken Norton turned down a $250,000 gate to fight Jerry Quarry to make the film.

Sylvester Stallone appeared as an uncredited extra in the lynching sequence.

=== Filming ===
The majority of the film was shot primarily in Louisiana, with some additional sequences in San Juan, Puerto Rico. Houmas and Ashland Plantations provided the backdrop for the film's fictitious "Falconhurst". The slave auction scenes was filmed at the New Orleans Mint.

=== Music ===
The score was composed by Maurice Jarre. The opening title song, "Born in this Time", was written by Jarre and Hi Tide Harris, and performed by Muddy Waters.

== Reception ==
=== Contemporary reviews ===
The critical reception of Mandingo was predominantly negative upon release, with the film being seen as being campy by reviewers in 1975. On review aggregator website Rotten Tomatoes, the film holds a score of 23% based on 22 reviews, with an average rating of 5.6/10.

Roger Ebert of the Chicago Sun-Times criticized the film, calling it "racist trash, obscene in its manipulation of human beings and feelings, and excruciating to sit through in an audience made up largely of children, as I did last Saturday afternoon", giving it a "zero star" rating. Richard Schickel of Time magazine found the film boring and cliché-ridden. Leonard Maltin ranked the film as a "BOMB" and dismissed with the word "Stinko!"

=== Critical re-evaluation ===
In the years following the film's initial release, the reception of the film became more favorable.

Jonathan Rosenbaum of Chicago Reader wrote in 1985 that Mandingo is "One of the most neglected and underrated Hollywood films of its era [...] it’s doubtful whether many more insightful and penetrating movies about American slavery exist." Critic Robin Wood was enthusiastic about the film, calling it "the greatest film about race ever made in Hollywood." New York Times columnist Dave Kehr called it "a thinly veiled Holocaust film that spares none of its protagonists", further describing it as "Fleischer's last great crime film, in which the role of the faceless killer is played by an entire social system." The film has also been the subject of scholarly praise for its handling of race.

In 1996, director Quentin Tarantino has cited Mandingo and Showgirls as the only two instances "in the last twenty years [that] a major studio made a full-on, gigantic, big-budget exploitation movie". In Tarantino's film Django Unchained (2012), the terminology of "Mandingo fighting" was inspired by the 1975 film.

== Sequel ==
Drum, the sequel to Mandingo, was released the following year. Released by United Artists, it was once again produced by Dino De Laurentiis. Ken Norton, Brenda Sykes, and Lillian Hayman were the only actors from the first film to return for the sequel. Norton and Sykes played different characters, and Hayman returned in the role of Lucretia Borgia. Warren Oates took over for Perry King in the role of Hammond Maxwell. The story is set 15 years after the events of the first film.

== See also ==
- List of films featuring slavery
