= Joe (1970 film) =

1970 film directed by John G. Avildsen

- US film poster
- Directed by: John G. Avildsen
- Written by: Norman Wexler
- Produced by: David Gil
- Starring: Peter Boyle; Dennis Patrick; Audrey Caire; Susan Sarandon; K Callan; Patrick McDermott
- Cinematography: John G. Avildsen
- Edited by: George T. Norris
- Music by: Bobby Scott
- Production company: Cannon Productions
- Distributed by: Cannon Releasing
- Release date: July 15, 1970
- Running time: 107 minutes
- Country: United States
- Language: English
- Budget: $106,000
- Box office: $19,319,254 or $9.5 million

Joe is a 1970 American satirical drama film directed by John G. Avildsen, from a screenplay by Norman Wexler, and starring Peter Boyle, Dennis Patrick, and Susan Sarandon in her film debut.

The film follows New York business executive Bill Compton (Patrick) as his life unravels into murderous chaos after he kills his daughter Melissa's drug-dealing boyfriend Frank Russo and enters into a peculiar partnership with factory worker Joe Curran (Boyle), a veteran with racist fantasies of vigilante violence. Their search for the missing Melissa (Sarandon) leads to a raid on a hippie commune that turns into mass murder where Compton mistakenly shoots his own daughter.

The film's plot coincidentally resembled a real-life mass murder in Detroit, where the killer Arville Garland had killed his own daughter Sandra. The real-life killer gained publicity for his actions, and received letters of support from hundreds of parents. The film has received praise for its dark humor and satire of social class.

== Plot ==
Advertising executive Bill Compton, his wife Joan, and daughter Melissa are a wealthy family in New York City's Upper East Side. Melissa has been living with her drug-dealing boyfriend, Frank Russo. After Melissa overdoses and is sent to a hospital, Compton goes to Russo's apartment to get her belongings. He confronts and kills Russo in a fit of rage. To disguise the act as a robbery, Compton takes a bag full of drugs with him and stashes it in his car. To calm his nerves, he has a drink in a nearby bar, where he hears factory worker Joe Curran ranting about how he hates hippies. Compton blurts out that he just killed one. Joe reacts favorably, but Compton says it was a joke.

A few days later, Joe sees a news report about a drug dealer found slain a few blocks from the bar. He calls Compton and meets him. At first Compton is wary that Joe may be attempting blackmail, but Joe assures him that he admires Compton for killing Russo. As the men drink together, they find a rapport despite Compton's initial unease. A few days later, Compton and Joan have an awkward dinner at Joe's house with his wife Mary Lou, and Joe shows Compton his gun collection.

Melissa escapes from the hospital and returns to the family apartment, where she overhears her parents discussing the murder. She confronts her father saying, "What are you gonna do, kill me too?" Compton tries to restrain her, but she breaks away.

Joe and Compton search for her in the streets and meet a group of hippies at a bar in downtown Manhattan. When Compton tells the hippies he has drugs, they are invited to the hippies' apartment, where they all take drugs and the girls have sex with Compton and Joe. The boys then abscond with Compton's bag of drugs as well as Joe's and Compton's wallets. Joe beats one of the girls until she tells him that their boyfriends often spend time in an upstate commune. Joe and Compton drive to the commune, with Joe bringing rifles. In a confrontation at the commune, Joe starts shooting the hippies and urges Compton to join him. When Compton finally does so, he unwittingly kills Melissa.

== Cast ==
- Peter Boyle as Joe Curran
- Dennis Patrick as Bill Compton
- Susan Sarandon as Melissa Compton
- Audrey Caire as Joan Compton
- K Callan as Mary Lou Curran
- Marlene Warfield as Bellevue Nurse
- Patrick McDermott as Frank Russo

== Reception ==
The film garnered both critical acclaim and box office success. Produced on a budget of only $106,000, it was a sleeper hit and grossed over $19.3 million in the United States and Canada, making it the 14th highest-grossing film of 1970. On review aggregator Rotten Tomatoes, it holds an 82% "Fresh" score based on 11 reviews, with an average rating of 6.6/10.

Variety wrote, "It sounds like heavy stuff, but scripter Norman Wexler has fleshed his serious skeleton with both melodrama plotting that sustains interest and the grittiest, most obscene dialog yet to boom from the silver screen. It works." Howard Thompson of The New York Times wrote, "The sad, disappointing thing about Joe is that a devastating, original idea cynically slopes into a melodramatic, surface fiasco." Gene Siskel of the Chicago Tribune gave the film three-and-a-half stars out of four and called it "a landmark film because of the issues and social norms it justifies. It is a dramatic, if not always sophisticated, documentary of a growing portion of the national mentality."

Charles Champlin of the Los Angeles Times called it "an immensely sophisticated piece of film-making," adding, "The plot is laced with implausibilities and the movie full of scenes which are heavily contrived but which play well because they are swept along by the plausibility of Joe himself." Gary Arnold of The Washington Post called it "a fascinating, tendentious picture—a topical murder melodrama and social parable, done in that vivid, loaded, paranoid style which seems to have become a tradition in record time but which remains exciting to watch, even if you question the drift and outcome of the parable." Penelope Gilliatt of The New Yorker wrote, "In the end, Joe sells us short. It shows us clashing archetypes, promises us something of large mind, and then stammers platitudes that lead theatrically every which way."

Norman Wexler's screenplay received an Academy Award nomination for Best Original Screenplay at the 43rd Academy Awards.

== Legacy ==
When Peter Boyle saw audience members cheering the violence in Joe, he refused to appear in any other film or television show that glorified violence. This included passing on the role of Jimmy "Popeye" Doyle in The French Connection (1971), which would earn Gene Hackman the Academy Award for Best Actor. Boyle nevertheless played ruthless gangster Dillon in 1973's The Friends of Eddie Coyle and in 1974's Crazy Joe (not a sequel), and not-so-ruthless gangster Jocko Dundee in the 1984 comedy Johnny Dangerously. He also appeared in the violent 1976 drama Taxi Driver. Joe inspired the creation of other tough, working class characters in '70s films and TV shows, including the character of Archie Bunker (Carroll O'Connor) on the TV show All in the Family.

In the 1980s, there were rumors that Boyle might appear in a sequel to Joe. Citizen Joe would have followed the titular character as he tried to rebuild his life after spending 10 years in prison, and would have also dealt with his grown children who held more liberal beliefs. Cannon Films periodically took out ads for unmade sequels to the film. Cannon promised Joe II in 1980, and in 1985 announced the coming of Citizen Joe with the tagline, "The times have changed but the man has not ... He's back." The film never materialized.

In his 2022 book Cinema Speculation, Quentin Tarantino deemed Joe "a kettle-black comedy about class in America, bordering on satire", while conceding that contemporary viewers may find it controversial to classify the film as such. He recalled that the audience he saw the film with in 1970, in a double feature with Carl Reiner's Where's Poppa?, watched the first section of Joe in silence, only to begin laughing "once Dennis Patrick enters the tavern, and Peter Boyle's Joe enters the movie", having gone from "repulsed repose to outright hilarity". Tarantino observed that "Boyle's comedic performance alleviates the picture's one-note ugliness".

== Real-life parallel ==
Ten weeks before Joe was released in the United States, a real-life mass murder with similarities to the movie's climactic scenes occurred in Detroit, Michigan. On May 7, 1970, a railroad worker named Arville Douglas Garland entered a university residence and killed his daughter Sandra, her boyfriend Scott Kabran and two other students, Gregory Walls and Anthony Brown.

During pre-trial deliberations, Judge Joseph A. Gillis saw Joe and strongly advised both the prosecution and defense teams to do the same. He then carefully screened each member of the jury pool and excluded any who had seen the movie. He also forbade any seated juror from watching the movie or discussing it with anyone who had seen it. Although he brought with him multiple weapons and extra ammunition, Garland received a light sentence.

Before and after sentencing, Garland received hundreds of letters from parents across the country who expressed sympathy with him. It was also reported that during the first weeks after his sentencing, he received no letters expressing outrage or condemnation of his actions.

== Soundtrack ==
Credits adapted from LP liner notes.

Joe

Soundtrack album by Various artists
- Released: 1970
- Label: Mercury Records
- Producers: Bobby Scott, Bob Cullen (B1), Daddy Ya Ya (B3)

Side one
No.	Title	Writer(s)	Length
1.	"Where Are You Goin'?" (Vocal: Jerry Butler)	Bobby Scott, Danny Meehan	3:20
2.	"The Expiration of Frank"	Scott	2:57
3.	"You Can Fly" (Vocal: Butler)	Scott, Meehan	11:25

Side two
No.	Title	Writer(s)	Length
1.	"Hey Joe" (Vocal: Dean Michaels)	Scott, Meehan	2:00
2.	"Compton's Hangout"	Scott	2:44
3.	"You Don't Know What's Goin' On" (Vocal: Exuma)	Exuma	3:27
4.	"It's a Crock"	Scott	1:20
5.	"When in Rome"	Scott	1:20
6.	"Send the Hippies to Hell"	Scott	4:15
7.	"Where Are You Goin'?" (Vocal: Butler)	Scott, Meehan	3:20

== See also ==
- List of American films of 1970
