= Richard Ward (actor) =

American actor (1915–1979)

- Born: March 15, 1915; Glenside, Pennsylvania, U.S.
- Died: July 1, 1979 (aged 64); Coxsackie, New York, U.S.
- Occupation: Actor
- Years active: 1949–1979

Richard Ward (March 15, 1915 – July 1, 1979) was an American actor on the stage, television, and in films, from 1949 until his death.

Though best known through his television appearances late in life, both in sitcoms and police procedurals, Ward also had an extensive film resume and a distinguished stage career, one of the highlights of the latter being his portrayal of Willy Loman in the 1972 production of Death of a Salesman, staged in Baltimore's Center Stage (the first African American production of Arthur Miller's signature opus, produced with the playwright's blessing). Ward's own favorite among his theatrical vehicles was Ceremonies in Dark Old Men.

== Life and career ==
Ward was born in Glenside, Pennsylvania on March 15, 1915. He worked as a New York City police detective for ten years before beginning his acting career.

An Actors Studio alumnus, Ward belatedly made his television debut in 1950 on the Perry Como Show, later appearing on dramatic anthology series such as Playhouse 90, Studio One, and Hallmark Hall of Fame, before becoming a familiar face on seventies sitcoms like Mary Hartman, Mary Hartman, All in the Family and The Jeffersons.

Ward made three guest appearances on Good Times as James's dad Henry (the name that James was known by on Maude), who had walked out on James' mom and siblings when he was younger. The first episode he appeared on, Henry was discovered by Thelma at a ship port where he was working and she brought him home to surprise James for his birthday. At first, James didn't want to see him, but after a deep conversation, Henry was welcomed by his son to join the celebration. James wished he could have 100 more years with his dad. The other two episodes Henry appeared on were after James' death.

On Sanford and Son, Ward appeared in the episode "The Stung" (1975); in it, Fred asks a professional gambler (played by Ward) to teach Lamont and his friends a lesson. In the pilot film for the cop show, Starsky & Hutch, Ward played Captain Dobey, though in the series itself that role was played by Bernie Hamilton. Ward did appear as a different character in one episode in the final series, shortly before his death due to a heart attack. He was married to Peggy Ward.

== Filmography ==
Year	Title	Role	Notes
1957	Carib Gold	Lechock	
1964	The Cool World	Street Speaker	
1964	Black Like Me	Burt Wilson	
1964	Nothing But a Man	Mill Hand	
1969	The Learning Tree	Booker Savage	
1971	Brother John	Frank	
1972	Across 110th Street	Doc Johnson	
1973	Cops and Robbers	Paul Jones	
1974	For Pete's Sake	Bernie	
1974	Petrocelli	Charlie Bobo	
1974	Sty of the Blind Pig	Blind Jordan	
1975	Mandingo	Agamemnon	
1976	The Death Collector	Gunsmith	
1979	The Jerk	Father	Posthumous release
1979	All in the Family	Ed Lewis	Episode: "The Family Next Door"; Season 9, Episode 22
1980	Brubaker	Abraham Cook	Posthumous release (final film role)
