= Mandingo (play) =

1961 play by Jack Kirkland

- Written by: Jack Kirkland
- Characters: Mede; Hammond Maxwell; Warren Maxwell; Blanche Maxwell; Ellen
- Original language: English
- Genre: Fiction
- Setting: Antebellum South

Premiere
- Date premiered: May 22, 1961
- Place premiered: Lyceum Theatre

Mandingo is an American theatrical play written by Jack Kirkland and based on the 1957 novel of the same name by Kyle Onstott. The cast of the Broadway production included Dennis Hopper, Brooke Hayward, Franchot Tone, Rockne Tarkington, and Georgia Burke. The story was made into a film by Paramount Pictures in 1975, directed by Richard Fleischer.

== Synopsis ==
An African slave is trained to fight other slaves on an antebellum Southern plantation.
