= List of accolades received by Django Unchained =

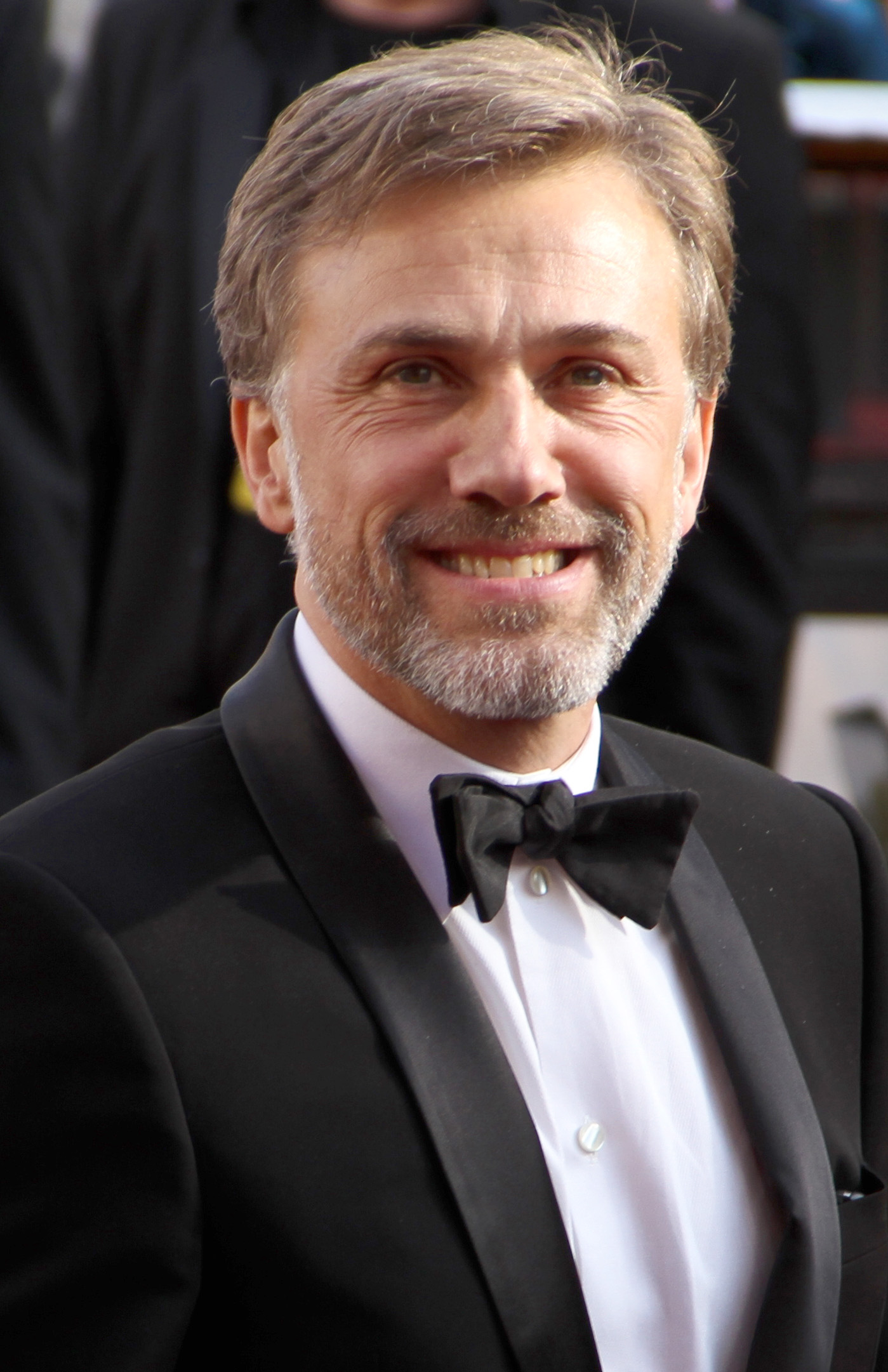
- Christoph Waltz's performance earned him several awards, including the Academy Award for Best Supporting Actor
Awards & nominations
Award	Won	Nominated
AACTA Awards	1	1
Academy Awards	2	5
African-American Film Critics Association	1	1
Alliance of Women Film Journalists	0	1
Amanda Award	0	1
American Film Institute Awards	1	1
Art Directors Guild	0	1
Austin Film Critics Association	1	1
Black Reel Awards	3	6
Bodil Awards	0	1
Boston Society of Film Critics	0	1
British Academy Film Awards	2	5
Broadcast Film Critics Association	1	2
César Awards	0	1
Chicago Film Critics Association	0	2
Dallas-Fort Worth Film Critics Association	0	2
David di Donatello Awards	1	1
Dublin Film Critics Circle	0	4
Empire Awards	0	3
Georgia Film Critics Association	0	4
Golden Globe Award	2	5
Golden Trailer Awards	1	5
Grammy Award	0	1
Hollywood Film Festival	1	1
Houston Film Critics Society	0	2
London Film Critics' Circle	0	1
Los Angeles Film Critics Association	0	1
Motion Picture Sound Editors	0	2
MTV Movie Awards	1	7
NAACP Image Award	2	4
National Board of Review	1	2
Online Film Critics Society	0	1
Producers Guild of America Award	0	1
San Diego Film Critics Society	1	5
Saturn Awards	1	4
St. Louis Film Critics Association	3	8
Taurus World Stunt Awards	0	2
Vancouver Film Critics Circle	0	2
Washington D.C. Area Film Critics	0	2
- Total number of wins and nominations
Totals	26	100
- References

Django Unchained is a 2012 American western film written and directed by Quentin Tarantino. It stars Jamie Foxx as Django, a freed slave, who teams up with a bounty hunter called Dr. King Schultz (Christoph Waltz) to free his wife from plantation owner Calvin Candie (Leonardo DiCaprio). Django Unchained was screened for the first time at the Directors Guild of America on December 1, 2012. Its official premiere was canceled in the wake of the Sandy Hook Elementary School shooting and was replaced with a screening for the cast and crew. Django Unchained was released on December 25, 2012, in the United States and on January 18, 2013, in the United Kingdom. As of December 7, 2013, Django Unchained has earned over $425 million at the box office.

The film has garnered various awards and nominations, with most nominations recognising the film itself, Tarantino's screenplay and the cast's acting performances, particularly those of Christoph Waltz and Leonardo DiCaprio. The American Film Institute included Django Unchained in their list of the Top Ten Movies of the Year, while the African-American Film Critics Association nominated it for Best Picture. The film gathered five Academy Award nominations in categories ranging from Best Original Screenplay to Best Cinematography and Best Sound Editing. The production designer for Django Unchained, J. Michael Riva, received a posthumous nomination for Excellence in Production Design for a Period Film from the Art Directors Guild. Tarantino earned a Best Original Screenplay nod from the Broadcast and Chicago Film Critics Associations.

The British Academy Film Awards nominated the film for five accolades, including Best Direction and Best Editing. Django Unchained also gathered five nominations from the Golden Globe Awards and came away with Best Screenplay and Best Supporting Actor for Waltz. The film received seven nominations from the MTV Movie Awards. The NAACP Image Awards nominated Foxx, Samuel L. Jackson and Kerry Washington for Best Actor or Supporting Actor awards, while the film was nominated for Outstanding Motion Picture. The National Board of Review included Django Unchained in their Best Film category and awarded DiCaprio the Best Supporting Actor accolade. The film was also nominated for Best Picture from the Producers Guild of America. Django Unchained garnered eight nominations from the St. Louis Film Critics Association, the most of any film, but came away with three awards.

== Awards and nominations ==
Award	Date of ceremony	Category	Recipient(s)	Result	Ref(s)
AACTA International Award	January 26, 2013	Best Screenplay	Quentin Tarantino	Won	
Academy Awards	February 24, 2013	Best Picture	Stacey Sher, Reginald Hudlin and Pilar Savone	Nominated	
Academy Awards	February 24, 2013	Best Supporting Actor	Christoph Waltz	Won	
Academy Awards	February 24, 2013	Best Original Screenplay	Quentin Tarantino	Won	
Academy Awards	February 24, 2013	Best Cinematography	Robert Richardson	Nominated	
Academy Awards	February 24, 2013	Best Sound Editing	Wylie Stateman	Nominated	
African-American Film Critics Association	December 16, 2012	Top 10 Films	Django Unchained	Won	
Alliance of Women Film Journalists	January 7, 2013	Best Actor in a Supporting Role	Christoph Waltz	Nominated	
Amanda Award	August 16, 2012	Best Foreign Feature Film	Django Unchained	Nominated	
American Film Institute Awards	December 10, 2012	Top Ten Movies of the Year	Django Unchained	Won	
Art Directors Guild	February 2, 2013	Excellence in Production Design for a Period Film	J. Michael Riva	Nominated	
Austin Film Critics Association	December 18, 2012	Best Supporting Actor	Christoph Waltz	Won	
Black Reel Awards	February 7, 2013	Outstanding Actor	Jamie Foxx	Nominated	
Black Reel Awards	February 7, 2013	Outstanding Ensemble	Django Unchained – Victoria Thomas	Won	
Black Reel Awards	February 7, 2013	Outstanding Motion Picture	Django Unchained	Nominated	
Black Reel Awards	February 7, 2013	Outstanding Original or Adapted Song	"Who Did That to You" – John Legend, Paul Epworth	Won	
Black Reel Awards	February 7, 2013	Outstanding Supporting Actor	Samuel L. Jackson	Won	
Black Reel Awards	February 7, 2013	Outstanding Supporting Actress	Kerry Washington	Nominated	
Bodil Awards	February 1, 2014	Best US Feature	Django Unchained	Nominated	
Boston Society of Film Critics	December 9, 2012	Best Supporting Actor	Christoph Waltz	Nominated	
British Academy Film Awards	February 10, 2013	Best Direction	Quentin Tarantino	Nominated	
British Academy Film Awards	February 10, 2013	Best Editing	Fred Raskin	Nominated	
British Academy Film Awards	February 10, 2013	Best Original Screenplay	Quentin Tarantino	Won	
British Academy Film Awards	February 10, 2013	Best Sound	Mark Ulano, Michael Minkler, Tony Lamberti, Wylie Stateman	Nominated	
British Academy Film Awards	February 10, 2013	Best Supporting Actor	Christoph Waltz	Won	
Broadcast Film Critics Association	January 10, 2013	Best Original Screenplay	Quentin Tarantino	Won	
Broadcast Film Critics Association	January 10, 2013	Best Picture	Django Unchained	Nominated	
César Awards	February 28, 2014	Best Foreign Film	Django Unchained	Nominated	
Chicago Film Critics Association	December 17, 2012	Best Original Screenplay	Quentin Tarantino	Nominated	
Chicago Film Critics Association	December 17, 2012	Best Supporting Actor	Leonardo DiCaprio	Nominated	
Dallas-Fort Worth Film Critics Association	December 18, 2012	Best Screenplay	Quentin Tarantino	Nominated	
Dallas-Fort Worth Film Critics Association	December 18, 2012	Best Supporting Actor	Christoph Waltz	Nominated	
David di Donatello Awards	June 14, 2013	Best Foreign Film	Django Unchained	Won	
Dublin Film Critics Circle	December 18, 2013	Best Actor	Leonardo DiCaprio	Nominated	
Dublin Film Critics Circle	December 18, 2013	Best Director	Quentin Tarantino	Nominated	
Dublin Film Critics Circle	December 18, 2013	Best Picture	Django Unchained	Nominated	
Dublin Film Critics Circle	December 18, 2013	Best Screenplay	Quentin Tarantino	Nominated	
Empire Awards	March 24, 2013	Best Actor	Christoph Waltz	Nominated	
Empire Awards	March 24, 2013	Best Director	Quentin Tarantino	Nominated	
Empire Awards	March 24, 2013	Best Film	Django Unchained	Nominated	
Georgia Film Critics Association	January 18, 2013	Best Ensemble	Django Unchained	Nominated	
Georgia Film Critics Association	January 18, 2013	Best Original Song	"Ancora qui" – Ennio Morricone and Elisa Toffoli	Nominated	
Georgia Film Critics Association	January 18, 2013	Best Supporting Actor	Samuel L. Jackson	Nominated	
Georgia Film Critics Association	January 18, 2013	Best Supporting Actor	Christoph Waltz	Nominated	
Golden Globe Award	January 13, 2013	Best Director	Quentin Tarantino	Nominated	
Golden Globe Award	January 13, 2013	Best Drama Motion Picture	Django Unchained	Nominated	
Golden Globe Award	January 13, 2013	Best Screenplay	Quentin Tarantino	Won	
Golden Globe Award	January 13, 2013	Best Supporting Actor	Leonardo DiCaprio	Nominated	
Golden Globe Award	January 13, 2013	Best Supporting Actor	Christoph Waltz	Won	
Golden Trailer Awards	May 3, 2013	Best Action Poster	Django Unchained – The Weinstein Company, Ignition Creative	Nominated	
Golden Trailer Awards	May 3, 2013	Best Foreign Graphics in a Trailer	"International" – Columbia Pictures, Greenhaus GFX	Nominated	
Golden Trailer Awards	May 3, 2013	Best Music	"Justice" – The Weinstein Company, Ignition Creative	Nominated	
Golden Trailer Awards	May 3, 2013	Best Music TV Spot	"Unchained BET" – The Weinstein Company, Ignition Creative	Won	
Golden Trailer Awards	May 3, 2013	Most Original Trailer	"Who Did That?" – The Weinstein Company, Trailer Park, Inc.	Nominated	
Grammy Awards	January 26, 2014	Best Compilation Soundtrack for Visual Media	Django Unchained – Various Artists	Nominated	
Hollywood Film Festival	October 22, 2012	Screenwriter of the Year	Quentin Tarantino	Won	
Houston Film Critics Society	January 5, 2013	Best Director	Quentin Tarantino	Nominated	
Houston Film Critics Society	January 5, 2013	Best Picture	Django Unchained	Nominated	
London Film Critics' Circle	January 20, 2013	Screenwriter of the Year	Quentin Tarantino	Nominated	
Los Angeles Film Critics Association	December 9, 2012	Best Supporting Actor	Christoph Waltz	Nominated	
Motion Picture Sound Editors	February 17, 2013	Best Music in a Feature Film	Django Unchained	Nominated	
Motion Picture Sound Editors	February 17, 2013	Best Sound Effects and Foley in a Feature Film	Django Unchained	Nominated	
MTV Movie Awards	April 14, 2013	Best Fight	Jamie Foxx vs. Candieland Henchmen	Nominated	
MTV Movie Awards	April 14, 2013	Best Kiss	Kerry Washington and Jamie Foxx	Nominated	
MTV Movie Awards	April 14, 2013	Best Male Performance	Jamie Foxx	Nominated	
MTV Movie Awards	April 14, 2013	Best On-Screen Duo	Leonardo DiCaprio and Samuel L. Jackson	Nominated	
MTV Movie Awards	April 14, 2013	Best Villain	Leonardo DiCaprio	Nominated	
MTV Movie Awards	April 14, 2013	Best 'WTF' Moment	"Candieland Gets Smoked"	Won	
MTV Movie Awards	April 14, 2013	Movie of the Year	Django Unchained	Nominated	
NAACP Image Award	February 1, 2013	Outstanding Actor in a Motion Picture	Jamie Foxx	Nominated	
NAACP Image Award	February 1, 2013	Outstanding Motion Picture	Django Unchained	Nominated	
NAACP Image Award	February 1, 2013	Outstanding Supporting Actor in a Motion Picture	Samuel L. Jackson	Won	
NAACP Image Award	February 1, 2013	Outstanding Supporting Actress in a Motion Picture	Kerry Washington	Won	
National Board of Review	December 5, 2012	Best Film	Django Unchained	Nominated	
National Board of Review	December 5, 2012	Best Supporting Actor	Leonardo DiCaprio	Won	
Online Film Critics Society	January 7, 2013	Best Supporting Actor	Christoph Waltz	Nominated	
Producers Guild of America Award	January 26, 2013	Best Theatrical Motion Picture	Reginald Hudlin, Stacey Sher, Pilar Savone	Nominated	
San Diego Film Critics Society	December 11, 2012	Best Cinematography	Robert Richardson	Nominated	
San Diego Film Critics Society	December 11, 2012	Best Ensemble Performance	Django Unchained	Nominated	
San Diego Film Critics Society	December 11, 2012	Best Original Screenplay	Quentin Tarantino	Nominated	
San Diego Film Critics Society	December 11, 2012	Best Picture	Django Unchained	Nominated	
San Diego Film Critics Society	December 11, 2012	Best Supporting Actor	Christoph Waltz	Won	
Saturn Awards	June 26, 2013	Best Action or Adventure Film	Django Unchained	Nominated	
Saturn Awards	June 26, 2013	Best Costume	Sharen Davis	Nominated	
Saturn Awards	June 26, 2013	Best Supporting Actor	Christoph Waltz	Nominated	
Saturn Awards	June 26, 2013	Best Writing	Quentin Tarantino	Won	
St. Louis Film Critics Association	December 17, 2012	Best Cinematography	Robert Richardson	Nominated	
St. Louis Film Critics Association	December 17, 2012	Best Director	Quentin Tarantino	Nominated	
St. Louis Film Critics Association	December 17, 2012	Best Actor	Jamie Foxx	Nominated	
St. Louis Film Critics Association	December 17, 2012	Best Music	Django Unchained	Won	
St. Louis Film Critics Association	December 17, 2012	Best Original Screenplay	Quentin Tarantino	Nominated	
St. Louis Film Critics Association	December 17, 2012	Best Film	Django Unchained	Nominated	
St. Louis Film Critics Association	December 17, 2012	Best Scene	Django Unchained	Won	
St. Louis Film Critics Association	December 17, 2012	Best Supporting Actor	Christoph Waltz	Won	
Taurus World Stunt Awards	May 15, 2013	Best Speciality Stunt	Wagon explosion	Nominated	
Taurus World Stunt Awards	May 15, 2013	Best Stunt Coordinator and/or second Unit Director	Jeff Dashnaw	Nominated	
Vancouver Film Critics Circle	January 7, 2013	Best Screenplay	Quentin Tarantino	Nominated	
Vancouver Film Critics Circle	January 7, 2013	Best Supporting Actor	Christoph Waltz	Nominated	
Washington D.C. Area Film Critics Association	December 10, 2012	Best Original Screenplay	Quentin Tarantino	Nominated	
Washington D.C. Area Film Critics Association	December 10, 2012	Best Supporting Actor	Leonardo DiCaprio	Nominated	
