= The Stunt Girl =

- Directed by: Robert Carlisle
- Produced by: Jerry Fairbanks
- Production company: Paramount Pictures
- Release date: 2 May 1947
- Running time: 11 minutes
- Country: United States
- Language: English

The Stunt Girl is a 1947 American short documentary film produced by Jerry Fairbanks and directed by Robert Carlisle. It recaps the career to date of Hollywood stuntwoman Lila Finn, who began working as a stunt double ten years earlier in the film The Hurricane. It includes Finn's performance of a stair fall especially for the film. The film was aired as part of the 1947 Paramount Pictures documentary series, Unusual Occupations.

== Production ==
The Stunt Girl is a short documentary film focusing on the career to date of Hollywood stuntwoman Lila Finn, who made her first appearance in The Hurricane (1937) as a stunt double for Dorothy Lamour. The film was produced by Jerry Fairbanks and directed by Robert Carlisle.

Finn was asked to demonstrate a stair fall in the film. She fell down a "long circular staircase eleven times" to satisfy the director.

The short film was aired as part of the 1947 Paramount Pictures documentary series, Unusual Occupations.

== Sources ==
- Gregory, Mollie (2015). Stuntwomen: The Untold Hollywood Story. University Press of Kentucky. ISBN 978-0-813-16624-7.
