= Lila Shanley =

American actress

- Born: November 28, 1909; Los Angeles, California, US
- Died: November 15, 1996 (aged 86); Santa Monica, California
- Other name: Lila Finn
- Occupations: Stuntwoman, stunt double, actress, athlete
- Children: 1

Lila Georgia Everett Finn Shanley (November 28, 1909 – November 15, 1996), stage name Lila Finn, was an American stuntwoman, stunt double, actress, and athlete. After first working as a stunt double for Dorothy Lamour in The Hurricane (1937), she doubled for many leading Hollywood actresses, including Vivien Leigh, Paulette Goddard, Donna Reed, Betty Hutton, and Sandra Dee, appearing in more than 100 films over nearly six decades. She was the founding president of the Stuntwomen's Association of Motion Pictures, established in 1958, and a founding member of the Screen Actors Guild. She also competed on the United States women's national volleyball team from 1955 to 1960 and won a team silver medal in the 1959 Pan American Games.

== Early life and family ==
Lila Georgia Everett was born in Los Angeles, California, on November 28, 1909. She was the daughter of Elmer E. Everett and Lila G. Baugh. Her father worked in real estate and her mother was a housewife. Growing up in the beachfront community of Venice, she often dove for coins from tourists at the Venice Hot Salt Water Plunge.

At age 19, she married her first husband, Charles Thornton Finn (born 1899), an American water polo player. She later remarried to Samuel Shanley, with whom she had one son, Barry, an attorney.

== Film career ==
At age 27, the blonde, 5 ft 3 in-tall (160 cm) Shanley was hired as the stunt double for Dorothy Lamour in The Hurricane (1937). An expert swimmer, she handled all of Lamour's swimming and diving scenes shot on location in Pago Pago, American Samoa, and Catalina Island. In one scene, Shanley lowered her sarong and was filmed diving into a lagoon in the nude. After The Hurricane became a hit, Shanley was hired to double for Lamour in her subsequent films.

Shanley went on to double for a succession of leading actresses, including Vivien Leigh in Gone with the Wind, Paulette Goddard in Reap the Wild Wind and Unconquered, Donna Reed in It's a Wonderful Life, Betty Hutton in The Perils of Pauline, and Sandra Dee in A Summer Place. She also doubled for Jane Powell, Olivia de Havilland, Ida Lupino, Veronica Lake, Joan Fontaine, Frances Dee, and Sonja Henie. She appeared in more than 100 films. In 1947, Jerry Fairbanks produced The Stunt Girl, a short documentary film highlighting her career to date.

Shanley performed a wide range of stunts. In the escape from Atlanta scene in Gone with the Wind, she rode in a horse-drawn carriage through the burning warehouses of the railroad depot. In the graduation party scene in It's a Wonderful Life, she fell into a swimming pool that lay underneath the retractable floor of a high school gymnasium. In Unconquered, she and stuntman Ted Mapes rode a canoe on the rapids then jumped out to grasp an overhanging tree limb; she also sustained an attack of "flaming arrows" in the same film. In To Catch a Thief, Shanley leaped from rooftop to rooftop, then rolled down a slanted roof and broke her fall. She had also "jumped out of bombers, been chased by lions, clawed by tigers, and thrown overboard into icy ocean waters at night", and served as the target for a knife-and-hatchet-thrower. Shanley said stair falls were her favorite stunt, explaining, "They are the most rewarding because everyone thinks they look great. They're quite simple, actually".

In 1981, the Chicago Tribune said that Shanley, then aged 72, "may be the oldest working stuntwoman in America". It credited her long and injury-free career to her conditioning program, which involved swimming 50 laps daily and playing beach volleyball.

== Volleyball career ==
Shanley was the manager of the Santa Monica Mariners women's volleyball team, which won several division titles. From 1955 to 1960, Shanley was a member of the United States women's national volleyball team. During this time, the national team competed in two world championships, winning the silver medal in the 1959 Pan American Games. Shanley was the oldest U.S. woman athlete at the 1959 Games.

== Memberships and affiliations ==
Shanley was the founding president of the Stuntwomen's Association of Motion Pictures, established in 1958. She was also a founding member of the Screen Actors Guild.

Shanley was inducted into the Stuntwomen's Hall of Fame. She received a Lifetime Achievement Award from Women in Film.

== Death ==
Shanley died from heart failure on November 15, 1996, aged 86, at Saint John's Health Center in Santa Monica.

== Selected filmography ==
- The Hurricane (1937)
- Gone with the Wind (1939)
- Typhoon (1940)
- Just Off Broadway (1942)
- Reap the Wild Wind (1942)
- Frenchman's Creek (1944)
- It's a Wonderful Life (1946)
- Unconquered (1947)
- The Perils of Pauline (1947)
- Scarlet Angel (1952)
- Guys and Dolls (1955)
- To Catch a Thief (1955)
- The Court Jester (1956)
- The Ten Commandments (1956)
- A Summer Place (1959)
- Spartacus (1960)
- The Spiral Road (1962)
- Incident in an Alley (1962)
- The Poseidon Adventure (1972)
- Blazing Saddles (1974)
- The Towering Inferno (1974)
- Earthquake (1974)
- Drum (1976)
- Heartbeeps (1981)
- Surf II (1984)
- The Goonies (1985)
- Out of Bounds (1986)
- Legal Eagles (1986)
- License to Drive (1988)
- Tango & Cash (1989)
- Police Academy 6: City Under Siege (1989)
- Predator 2 (1990)
- Repossessed (1990)
- RoboCop 2 (1990)
- The Naked Gun 2½: The Smell of Fear (1991)
- The Rocketeer (1991)
- Goliath Awaits (1991)
- Suburban Commando (1991)
- Folks! (1992)

== Sources ==
- Freese, Gene Scott (2014). Hollywood Stunt Performers, 1910s-1970s: A Biographical Dictionary (2nd ed.). McFarland. ISBN 9780786476435.
- Gregory, Mollie (2015). Stuntwomen: The Untold Hollywood Story. University Press of Kentucky. ISBN 978-0-813-16624-7.
- Slide, Anthony (2012). Hollywood Unknowns: A History of Extras, Bit Players, and Stand-Ins. University Press of Mississippi. ISBN 978-1-617-03475-6.
