= Kyle Onstott =

American novelist (1887 – 1966)

Kyle Elihu Onstott
- Born: Kyle Elihu Onstott; January 12, 1887; Du Quoin, Illinois, U.S.
- Died: June 1, 1966 (aged 79); U.S.
- Occupation: Novelist
- Writing career
- Genre: Fiction
- Notable work: Mandingo

Kyle Elihu Onstott (January 12, 1887 – June 3, 1966) was an American novelist, known for his best-selling novel Mandingo (1957). It was set in the antebellum South, in the 1830s at a fictional Alabama plantation. The book was adapted as a 1961 play and a 1975 feature film of the same name.

== Biography ==
Born and raised in Illinois, by the early 1900s Onstott lived with his widowed mother in California. He was a dog breeder and served as a judge in regional dog shows. A lifelong bachelor, at age 40, he adopted a 23-year-old college student, Philip, who had lost his own parents. After Philip married Vicky, the couple remained close to Onstott for the rest of his life. Onstott dedicated Mandingo to Philip and Vicky.

Onstott began writing Mandingo when he was 65 years old. He had collaborated with Philip on a book about dog breeding but hoped to make more money with a novel.

He based certain events on what he said were "bizarre legends" he heard while growing up: tales of slave breeding and abuse of slaves. "Utilizing his [adopted] son's anthropology research on West Africa, he handwrote Mandingo and his son served as editor. Denlinger's, a small Virginia publisher, released it and it became a national sensation." He was invited to write an article for True: The Man's Magazine in 1959 about the horrors of slavery.

A sequel and a series of other novels followed, mostly written with Lance Horner. The usual setting of their work was plantations and the lives of enslaved African Americans and planters in the antebellum South. They also wrote the 1966 novel Child of the Sun, recounting the scandalous reign of homosexual Roman emperor Elagabalus.

== Works ==
- Beekeeping as a Hobby (1941)
- The New Art of Breeding Better Dogs (1962, with Philip Onstott)
- Mandingo (1957)
- The Black Sun
- Child of the Sun (with Lance Horner)
- Falconhurst Fancy
- Flight to Falconhurst
- Master of Falconhurst
- The Tattooed Rood
- Drum (1962)
- Strange Harvest (with Ashley Carter)
