= List of American International Pictures films =

Wikimedia list article

American International Pictures was a film production and distribution company founded in 1954 by James H. Nicholson and Samuel Z. Arkoff.

== 1950s ==
Release date	Title	Genre	Director
as American Releasing Corporation
February 15, 1955	The Fast and the Furious	Crime	John Ireland
April 15, 1955	Five Guns West	Western	Roger Corman
May 15, 1955	Outlaw Treasure	Western	Oliver Drake
June 15, 1955	The Beast with a Million Eyes	Sci-fi	David Kramarsky Lou Place Uncredited: Roger Corman
September 15, 1955	Apache Woman	Western	Roger Corman
October 25, 1955	Operation Malaya	Documentary	David MacDonald
December 1955	Day the World Ended	Sci-fi	Roger Corman
December 1955	The Phantom from 10,000 Leagues	Sci-fi	Dan Milner
June 15, 1956	The Oklahoma Woman	Western	Roger Corman
June 15, 1956	Female Jungle	Crime	Bruno VeSota
June 1956	Gunslinger	Western	Roger Corman
as American International Pictures
July 15, 1956	It Conquered the World	Sci-fi	Roger Corman
July 15, 1956	The She-Creature	Horror	Edward L. Cahn
July 1956	Girls in Prison	Crime	Edward L. Cahn
July 1956	Hot Rod Girl	Action	Lew Landers
July 15, 1956	Runaway Daughters	Crime	Edward L. Cahn
July 15, 1956	Shake, Rattle & Rock!	Musical	Edward L. Cahn
January 1957	Naked Paradise	Crime	Roger Corman
January 1957	Flesh and the Spur	Western	Edward L. Cahn
March 1, 1957	Voodoo Woman	Horror	Edward L. Cahn
March 1, 1957	The Undead	Horror	Roger Corman
April 24, 1957	Dragstrip Girl	Action	Edward L. Cahn
April 24, 1957	Rock All Night	Crime	Roger Corman
June 19, 1957	I Was a Teenage Werewolf	Horror	Gene Fowler Jr.
June 19, 1957	Invasion of the Saucer Men	Sci-fi	Edward L. Cahn
August 1957	Naked Africa	Documentary	Ray Phoenix
August 1957	The White Huntress	Adventure	George P. Breakston
August 1957	Reform School Girl	Crime	Edward Bernds
August 1957	Rock Around the World	Musical	Gerard Bryant
October 22, 1957	Motorcycle Gang	Outlaw biker	Edward L. Cahn
October 22, 1957	Sorority Girl	Drama	Roger Corman
October 25, 1957	The Amazing Colossal Man	Sci-fi	Bert I. Gordon
October 25, 1957	Cat Girl	Horror	Alfred Shaughnessy
November 23, 1957	I Was a Teenage Frankenstein	Horror	Herbert L. Strock
November 23, 1957	Blood of Dracula	Horror	Herbert L. Strock
December 1957	The Saga of the Viking Women and Their Voyage to the Waters of the Great Sea Serpent	Adventure	Roger Corman
December 1957	The Astounding She-Monster	Sci-fi horror	Ronald V. Ashcroft
January 1958	The Screaming Skull	Horror	Alex Nicol
January 1958	Terror from the Year 5000	Sci-fi	Robert J. Gurney Jr.
February 1958	Jet Attack	War	Edward L. Cahn
February 1958	Suicide Battalion	War	Edward L. Cahn
March 1958	The Cool and the Crazy	Drama	William Witney
March 1958	Dragstrip Riot	Drama	David Bradley
May 28, 1958	The Bonnie Parker Story	Crime	William Witney
May 28, 1958	Machine-Gun Kelly	Action	Roger Corman
June 1958	High School Hellcats	Crime	Edward Bernds
June 1958	Hot Rod Gang	Drama	Lew Landers
July 1, 1958	How to Make a Monster	Horror	Herbert L. Strock
July 1, 1958	Teenage Caveman	Sci-fi	Roger Corman
July 30, 1958	War of the Colossal Beast	Sci-fi	Bert I. Gordon
July 30, 1958	Attack of the Puppet People	Sci-fi	Bert I. Gordon
July 1958	Hell Squad	War	Burt Topper
July 1958	Tank Battalion	War	Sherman A. Rose
August 1958	Night of the Blood Beast	Sci-fi horror	Bernard L. Kowalski
August 1958	She Gods of Shark Reef	Adventure	Roger Corman
September 1958	The Brain Eaters	Sci-fi horror	Bruno VeSota
September 1958	Earth vs. the Spider	Sci-fi	Bert I. Gordon
December 1958	Submarine Seahawk	War	Spencer Gordon Bennet
December 1958	Paratroop Command	War	William Witney
March 1959	Roadracers	Action	Arthur Swerdloff
March 1959	Daddy-O	Crime	Lou Place
March 1959	Tank Commandos	War	Burt Topper
March 1959	Operation Dames	War	Louis Clyde Stoumen
April 29, 1959	The Headless Ghost	Horror	Peter Graham Scott
April 29, 1959	Horrors of the Black Museum	Horror	Arthur Crabtree
July 1959	Diary of a High School Bride	Romance	Burt Topper
July 1959	Ghost of Dragstrip Hollow	Horror	William J. Hole Jr.
September 23, 1959	Sheba and the Gladiator	Sword-and-sandal	Guido Brignone
September 23, 1959	Goliath and the Barbarians	Sword-and-sandal	Carlo Campogalliani
October 21, 1959	A Bucket of Blood	Horror	Roger Corman
October 21, 1959	Attack of the Giant Leeches	Sci-fi horror	Bernard L. Kowalski

== 1960s ==
Release date	Title	Genre	Director
June 22, 1960	House of Usher	Horror	Roger Corman
June 1960	The Jailbreakers	Crime	Alex Grasshoff
June 1960	Why Must I Die?	Crime	Roy Del Ruth
July 1960	The Amazing Transparent Man	Sci-fi	Edgar G. Ulmer
July 1960	Beyond the Time Barrier	Sci-fi	Edgar G. Ulmer
August 31, 1960	Circus of Horrors	Horror	Sidney Hayers
August 31, 1960	The Angry Red Planet	Sci-fi	Sidney W. Pink
October 1960	Journey to the Lost City	combined film of The Indian Tomb and The Tiger of Eschnapur	Fritz Lang
November 1960	Goliath and the Dragon	Sword-and-sandal	Vittorio Cottafavi
February 15, 1961	Black Sunday	Horror	Mario Bava
March 22, 1961	The Hand	Crime	Henry Cass
March 22, 1961	Beware of Children	Comedy	Gerald Thomas
May 3, 1961	Konga	Horror	John Lemont
May 3, 1961	Master of the World	Sci-fi	William Witney
July 14, 1961	Alakazam the Great	Anime	Taiji Yabushita Daisaku Shirakawa
August 12, 1961	The Pit and the Pendulum	Horror	Roger Corman
October 1961	The Two Faces of Dr. Jekyll	Horror	Terence Fisher
December 6, 1961	Portrait of a Sinner	Drama	Robert Siodmak
December 12, 1961	The Continental Twist	Musical	William J. Hole
December 13, 1961	Assignment Outer Space	Sci-fi	Antonio Margheriti
December 13, 1961	The Phantom Planet	Sci-fi	William Marshall
December 28, 1961	Flight of the Lost Balloon	Sci-fi adventure	Nathan Juran
January 1962	Guns of the Black Witch	Adventure	Domenico Paolella
January 1962	Lost Battalion	War	Eddie Romero
1962	Battle Beyond the Sun	Sci-fi	Mikhail Karyukov Aleksandr Kozyr
1962	Night Tide	Horror	Curtis Harrington
March 7, 1962	The Premature Burial	Horror	Roger Corman
March 10, 1962	Journey to the Seventh Planet	Sci-fi	Sidney W. Pink
April 21, 1962	Duel of Fire	Adventure	Umberto Lenzi
April 25, 1962	Burn, Witch, Burn	Horror	Sidney Hayers
June 1962	The Prisoner of the Iron Mask	Adventure	Francesco De Feo
June 6, 1962	A House of Sand	Drama	Robert Darwin
July 4, 1962	Tales of Terror	Horror	Roger Corman
July 4, 1962	Panic in Year Zero!	Nuclear war thriller	Ray Milland
August 10, 1962	The Brain That Wouldn't Die	Sci-fi	Joseph Green
August 10, 1962	Invasion of the Star Creatures	Sci-fi comedy	Bruno VeSota
August 1962	Marco Polo	Adventure	Piero Pierotti
September 1962	White Slave Ship	Adventure	Silvio Amadio
November 18, 1962	A Story of David	Biblical	Bob McNaught
December 1962	Samson and the Seven Miracles of the World	Sword-and-sandal	Riccardo Freda
December 1962	Warriors Five!	War	Leopoldo Savona
January 20, 1963	Reptilicus	Sci-fi horror	Sidney W. Pink
January 25, 1963	The Raven	Horror	Roger Corman
March 3, 1963	California	Western	Hamil Petroff
March 26, 1963	Operation Bikini	War	Anthony Carras
April 24, 1963	Free, White and 21	Drama	Larry Buchanan
May 1, 1963	The Mind Benders	Spy	Basil Dearden
June 12, 1963	Erik the Conqueror	Adventure	Mario Bava
June 17, 1963	The Terror	Horror	Roger Corman
August 7, 1963	Beach Party	Beach party	William Asher
August 28, 1963	The Haunted Palace	Horror	Roger Corman
September 18, 1963	X: The Man with the X-ray Eyes	Horror	Roger Corman
September 25, 1963	Dementia 13	Horror	Francis Coppola
October 23, 1963	Summer Holiday	Beach party	Peter Yates
December 18, 1963	Samson and the Slave Queen	Sword-and-sandal	Umberto Lenzi
December 25, 1963	Goliath and the Sins of Babylon	Sword-and-sandal	Michele Lupo
1964	Hercules and the Tyrants of Babylon	Sword-and-sandal	Domenico Paolella
January 22, 1964	The Comedy of Terrors	Comedy horror	Jacques Tourneur
January 22, 1964	Pyro... The Thing Without a Face	Horror	Julio Coll
March 25, 1964	Muscle Beach Party	Beach party	William Asher
March 1964	Under Age	Drama	Larry Buchanan
April 1, 1964	Commando	War	Frank Wisbar
April 1, 1964	Torpedo Bay	War	Charles Frend Bruno Vailati
April 1964	Unearthly Stranger	Sci-fi	John Krish
April 1964	Goliath and the Vampires	Horror	Sergio Corbucci Giacomo Gentilomo
May 6, 1964	Black Sabbath	Horror anthology	Mario Bava
May 6, 1964	The Last Man on Earth	Horror	Ubaldo Ragona Sidney Salkow
May 20, 1964	The Evil Eye	Giallo	Mario Bava
June 24, 1964	The Masque of the Red Death	Horror	Roger Corman
June 1964	Some People	Musical	Clive Donner
July 2, 1964	Swingers' Paradise	Musical	Sidney J. Furie
July 22, 1964	Bikini Beach	Beach party	William Asher
September 17, 1964	Godzilla vs. the Thing	Sci-fi	Ishirō Honda
September 1964	Diary of a Bachelor	Comedy	Sandy Howard
October 29, 1964	The Time Travelers	Sci-fi	Ib Melchior
November 11, 1964	Pajama Party	Beach party	Don Weis
November 25, 1964	Navajo Run	Western	Johnny Seven
November 25, 1964	Voyage to the End of the Universe	Sci-fi	Jindřich Polák
December 16, 1964	The Umbrellas of Cherbourg	Drama	Jacques Demy
December 29, 1964	T.A.M.I. Show	Concert documentary	Steve Binder
1965	The Eye Creatures	Sci-fi	Larry Buchanan
January 20, 1965	The Tomb of Ligeia	Horror	Roger Corman
January 27, 1965	Operation Snafu	War comedy	Cyril Frankel
March 3, 1965	The Lost World of Sinbad	Adventure	Senkichi Taniguchi
March 11, 1965	Atragon	J-Horror	Ishirō Honda
March 1965	Rome Against Rome	Sword-and-sandal	Giuseppe Vari
April 14, 1965	Beach Blanket Bingo	Beach party	William Asher
April 20, 1965	The Pawnbroker	Drama	Sidney Lumet
April 28, 1965	The Fool Killer	Adventure drama	Servando González
April 1965	Taboos of the World	Shockumentary	Romolo Marcellini
May 19, 1965	Go Go Mania	Musical	Frederic Goode
May 26, 1965	War-Gods of the Deep	Horror	Jacques Tourneur
June 30, 1965	Ski Party	Beach party	Alan Rafkin
July 8, 1966	Frankenstein Conquers the World	Sci-fi	Ishirō Honda
July 14, 1965	How to Stuff a Wild Bikini	Beach party	William Asher
August 1, 1965	Voyage to the Prehistoric Planet	Sci-fi	Curtis Harrington
August 18, 1965	Sergeant Deadhead	Comedy	Norman Taurog
October 27, 1965	Die, Monster, Die!	Horror	Daniel Haller
October 27, 1965	Planet of the Vampires	Sci-fi	Mario Bava
November 6, 1965	Dr. Goldfoot and the Bikini Machine	Comedy	Norman Taurog
November 30, 1965	King & Country	Drama	Joseph Losey
January 1, 1966	Nashville Rebel	Comedy	Jay Sheridan
1966	Zontar, the Thing from Venus	Sci-fi	Larry Buchanan
1966	Curse of the Swamp Creature	Sci-fi	Larry Buchanan
January 12, 1966	Secret Agent Fireball	Eurospy	Luciano Martino
January 12, 1966	Spy in Your Eye	Eurospy	Vittorio Sala
January 1966	The Big T.N.T. Show	Concert documentary	Larry Peerce
January 1966	Conquered City	War	Joseph Anthony
March 2, 1966	Queen of Blood	Sci-fi	Curtis Harrington
March 2, 1966	Blood Bath	Horror	Jack Hill
April 12, 1966	The Girl-Getters	Drama	Michael Winner
April 13, 1966	The Dirty Game	Eurospy anthology	Christian-Jaque Werner Klingler Carlo Lizzani Terence Young
April 1966	Man from Cocody	Action	Christian-Jaque
April 1966	What's Up, Tiger Lily?	Spy comedy film	Woody Allen Senkichi Taniguchi
April 1966	The Ghost in the Invisible Bikini	Beach party	Don Weis
May 1966	The Great Spy Chase	Eurospy	Georges Lautner
May 1966	Our Man in Marrakesh	Action	Don Sharp
June 7, 1966	Fireball 500	Car racing film	William Asher
July 1966	Tarzan and the Valley of Gold	Adventure	Robert Day
July 20, 1966	The Wild Angels	Outlaw biker	Roger Corman
November 9, 1966	Dr. Goldfoot and the Girl Bombs	Eurospy comedy	Mario Bava
November 1966	Door to Door Maniac	Crime	Bill Karn
December 28, 1966	Trunk to Cairo	Spy	Menahem Golan
1967	Mars Needs Women	Sci-fi	Larry Buchanan
1967	In the Year 2889	Sci-fi	Larry Buchanan
1967	Creature of Destruction	Sci-fi	Larry Buchanan
January 18, 1967	War Italian Style	War comedy	Luigi Scattini
March 18, 1967	Riot on Sunset Strip	Drama	Arthur Dreifuss
March 22, 1967	Thunder Alley	Car racing film	Richard Rush
April 1967	Devil's Angels	Outlaw biker film	Daniel Haller
May 17, 1967	The Million Eyes of Sumuru	Action	Lindsay Shonteff
June 1967	Love Is a Woman	Mystery	Frederic Goode
August 23, 1967	The Trip	Drama	Roger Corman
November 1967	The House of 1,000 Dolls	Crime	Jeremy Summers
November 22, 1967	The Glory Stompers	Outlaw biker	Anthony M. Lanza
1968	Voyage to the Planet of Prehistoric Women	Sci-fi	Peter Bogdanovich
January 18, 1968	The Born Losers	Outlaw biker	T. C. Frank
January 24, 1968	Maryjane	Drama	Maury Dexter
January 24, 1968	The Wild Racers	Racing car film	Daniel Haller
March 28, 1968	The Road Hustlers	Action	Larry E. Jackson
May 1968	The Mini-Skirt Mob	Outlaw biker	Maury Dexter
May 1968	The Savage Seven	Outlaw biker	Richard Rush
May 15, 1968	Witchfinder General	Horror	Michael Reeves
May 29, 1968	Wild in the Streets	Comedy-drama	Barry Shear
September 22, 1968	Psych-Out	Drama	Richard Rush
October 1968	The Young Animals	Drama	Maury Dexter
November 1968	Killers Three	Crime	Bruce Kessler
December 4, 1968	The Brute and the Beast	Spaghetti Western	Lucio Fulci
December 20, 1968	Three in the Attic	Comedy-drama	Richard Wilson
1969	'It's Alive!'	Horror	Larry Buchanan
March 18, 1969	The Wonderful World of Puss 'n Boots	Anime	Kimio Yabuki
April 16, 1969	Hell's Belles	Outlaw biker	Maury Dexter
May 1969	God Forgives... I Don't!	Spaghetti Western	Giuseppe Colizzi
May 14, 1969	The Devil's 8	Moonshine Action	Burt Topper
May 23, 1969	Destroy All Monsters	Sci-fi	Ishirō Honda
June 11, 1969	The Oblong Box	Horror	Gordon Hessler
June 20, 1969	Carry on Camping	Comedy	Gerald Thomas
July 23, 1969	Spirits of the Dead	Horror anthology	Roger Vadim Louis Malle Federico Fellini
August 19, 1969	Angel, Angel, Down We Go	Crime	Robert Thom
August 27, 1969	De Sade	Drama	Cy Endfield Uncredited: Roger Corman Gordon Hessler
September 8, 1969	The Honeymoon Killers	Crime	Leonard Kastle
September 10, 1969	Hell's Angels '69	Outlaw biker	Lee Madden Conny Van Dyke
October 7, 1969	Battle of Neretva	War film	Veljko Bulajić

== 1970s ==
Release date	Title	Genre	Director	Notes
1970	Pacific Vibrations	Documentary	John Severson	
January 1970	The Savage Wild	Documentary	Gordon Eastman	
January 1970	Scream and Scream Again	Sci-fi thriller	Gordon Hessler	
January 14, 1970	The Dunwich Horror	Horror	Daniel Haller	
March 24, 1970	Bloody Mama	Drama	Roger Corman	
April 15, 1970	The Haunted House of Horror	Slasher	Michael Armstrong	
April 15, 1970	The Crimson Cult	Horror	Vernon Sewell	
May 8, 1970	Lola	Romantic comedy-drama	Richard Donner	
June 1970	A Bullet for Pretty Boy	Action	Larry Buchanan	
June 10, 1970	Count Yorga, Vampire	Horror	Bob Kelljan	
July 22, 1970	Cry of the Banshee	Horror	Gordon Hessler	
September 2, 1970	Angel Unchained	Outlaw biker	Lee Madden	
September 9, 1970	Venus in Furs	Erotic thriller	Jesús Franco	
October 22, 1970	The Vampire Lovers	Horror	Roy Ward Baker	
November 1970	Bora Bora	Drama	Ugo Liberatore	
February 1971	Secret Life of a Schoolgirl Wife	Comedy-drama	Leon Capetanos	
February 3, 1971	Julius Caesar	Drama	Stuart Burge	
February 17, 1971	Gas-s-s-s	Sci-fi comedy-drama	Roger Corman	
February 18, 1971	Wuthering Heights	Romance	Robert Fuest	
March 17, 1971	Blood and Lace	Horror	Philip S. Gilbert	
April 22, 1971	The Hard Ride	Outlaw biker	Burt Topper	
April 28, 1971	The Incredible 2-Headed Transplant	Sci-fi horror	Anthony Lanza	
May 18, 1971	The Abominable Dr. Phibes	Comedy horror	Robert Fuest	
June 9, 1971	Yog, Monster From Space	Sci-fi	Ishirō Honda	
August 20, 1971	Swedish Fly Girls	Drama	Jack O'Connell	
September 29, 1971	Chrome and Hot Leather	Outlaw biker	Lee Frost	
October 6, 1971	Murders in the Rue Morgue	Horror	Gordon Hessler	
October 13, 1971	A Lizard in a Woman's Skin	Giallo	Lucio Fulci	
October 18, 1971	Bunny O'Hare	Comedy	Gerd Oswald	
October 27, 1971	Some of My Best Friends Are...	Drama	Mervyn Nelson	
October 1971	1000 Convicts and a Woman	Drama	Ray Austin	
December 22, 1971	Kidnapped	Adventure	Delbert Mann	
January 19, 1972	Together	Mockumentary	Sean S. Cunningham	
February 2, 1972	The Return of Count Yorga	Horror	Bob Kelljan	
February 1972	Godzilla vs. the Smog Monster	Kaiju	Yoshimitsu Banno	
March 10, 1972	Frogs	Horror	George McCowan	
March 15, 1972	Whoever Slew Auntie Roo?	Horror	Curtis Harrington	
April 1972	Dr. Jekyll and Sister Hyde	Sci-fi horror	Roy Ward Baker	
May 3, 1972	A Bay of Blood	Horror	Mario Bava	
May 17, 1972	Blood from the Mummy's Tomb	Horror	Seth Holt	
May 1972	Pickup on 101	Drama	John Florea	
May 1972	Wild in the Sky	Action comedy	William T. Naud	
May 1972	The Bloody Judge	Horror	Jesús Franco	
June 14, 1972	Boxcar Bertha	Crime	Martin Scorsese	
July 19, 1972	The Thing with Two Heads	Sci-fi	Lee Frost	
July 21, 1972	F.T.A.	Documentary	Francine Parker	
July 1972	Dr. Phibes Rises Again	Horror	Robert Fuest	
August 16, 1972	Slaughter	Blaxploitation	Jack Starrett	
August 25, 1972	Blacula	Blaxploitation	William Crain	
August 1972	Deathmaster	Horror	Ray Danton	
August 1972	The Sandpit Generals	Drama	Hall Bartlett	
September 1972	Tam Lin	Horror	Roddy McDowall	
October 10, 1972	Baron Blood	Horror	Mario Bava	
November 1972	The Dirt Gang	Action drama	Jerry Jameson	
November 10, 1972	Unholy Rollers	Action comedy	Vernon Zimmerman	
November 22, 1972	Prison Girls	Crime	Thomas De Simone	
January 19, 1973	Black Mama White Mama	Women in prison	Eddie Romero	
January 1973	Manson	Documentary	Robert Hendrickson and Laurence Merrick	
February 7, 1973	Black Caesar	Blaxploitation	Larry Cohen	
March 27, 1973	Sisters	Horror	Brian De Palma	
April 1973	Cannibal Girls	Comedy horror	Ivan Reitman	
May 4, 1973	Deep Thrust	Action	Huang Feng	
May 11, 1973	Coffy	Blaxploitation	Jack Hill	
June 27, 1973	Scream, Blacula, Scream	Blaxploitation	Bob Kelljan	
June 1973	Little Cigars	Crime comedy	Chris Christenberry	
July 20, 1973	Dillinger	Crime	John Milius	
August 8, 1973	Heavy Traffic	Animated comedy-drama	Ralph Bakshi	
August 31, 1973	Slaughter's Big Rip-Off	Blaxploitation	Gordon Douglas	
September 1973	Death Line	Horror	Gary Sherman	
October 31, 1973	The Italian Connection	Action	Fernando di Leo	
October 1973	The Screaming Tiger	Action	Lung Chien	
November 21, 1973	Battle of the Amazons	Sword-and-sandal	Alfonso Brescia	
December 1973	Hell Up in Harlem	Blaxploitation	Larry Cohen	
December 31, 1973	School for Unclaimed Girls	Drama	Robert Hartford-Davis	
January 30, 1974	The Bat People	Horror	Jerry Jameson	
February 13, 1974	Bamboo Gods and Iron Men	Blaxploitation comedy	Cesar Gallardo	
March 6, 1974	Deranged	Horror	Alan Ormsby	
March 20, 1974	Sugar Hill	Blaxploitation horror	Paul Maslansky	
April 5, 1974	Foxy Brown	Blaxploitation	Jack Hill	
May 15, 1974	Truck Stop Women	Action	Mark L. Lester	
May 24, 1974	Madhouse	Horror	Jim Clark	
June 5, 1974	Thriller: A Cruel Picture	Rape and revenge	Alex Fridolinski	
June 5, 1974	Dirty O'Neil	Crime thriller	Leon Capetanos Lewis Teague	
June 26, 1974	The Nine Lives of Fritz the Cat	Animated comedy	Robert Taylor	
June 26, 1974	Truck Turner	Blaxploitation	Jonathan Kaplan	
July 17, 1974	Golden Needles	Action	Robert Clouse	
July 1974	Savage Sisters	Women in prison	Eddie Romero	
August 8, 1974	Macon County Line	Action	Richard Compton	
August 18, 1974	Act of Vengeance	Horror	Bob Kelljan	
October 1974	Hangup	Action	Henry Hathaway	
November 22, 1974	Sunday in the Country	Crime thriller	John Trent	
December 25, 1974	Abby	Blaxploitation horror	William Girdler	
1975	Vampira	Comedy horror	Clive Donner	
February 1975	Super Stooges vs. the Wonder Women	Superhero comedy	Alfonso Brescia	
March 26, 1975	Sheba, Baby	Blaxploitation	William Girdler	
March 1975	House of Whipcord	Horror	Pete Walker	
March 1975	War Goddess	Adventure	Terence Young	
March 1975	The Wild Party	Comedy-drama	James Ivory	
April 25, 1975	The Reincarnation of Peter Proud	Mystery horror	J. Lee Thompson	
May 21, 1975	Cornbread, Earl and Me	Drama	Joseph Manduke	
May 21, 1975	The Wild McCullochs	Drama	Max Baer Jr.	
May 1975	What Have You Done to Solange?	Giallo	Massimo Dallamano	
June 11, 1975	Murph the Surf	Biographical crime comedy	Marvin J. Chomsky	
June 25, 1975	Cooley High (Note: Inducted into the National Film Registry in 2021)	Comedy-drama	Michael Schultz	Inducted into the National Film Registry in 2021
July 2, 1975	Bucktown	Blaxploitation	Arthur Marks	
July 31, 1975	Hennessy	Thriller	Don Sharp	
August 13, 1975	The Land That Time Forgot	Adventure fantasy	Kevin Connor	
September 3, 1975	Return to Macon County	Drama	Richard Compton	
September 28, 1975	Walking Tall Part 2	Crime	Earl Bellamy	
December 17, 1975	Sixpack Annie	Action comedy	Graydon F. David	
December 25, 1975	Friday Foster	Blaxploitation	Arthur Marks	
January 14, 1976	Killer Force	Thriller	Val Guest	
March 1976	Bobbie Jo and the Outlaw	Crime drama	Mark L. Lester	
March 1976	One Summer Love	Romantic drama	Gilbert Cates	
April 21, 1976	Crime and Passion	Crime	Ivan Passer	
May 1976	Annie	Drama	Massimo Dallamano	
June 18, 1976	The Food of the Gods	Sci-fi thriller	Bert I. Gordon	
June 23, 1976	The Great Scout & Cathouse Thursday	Comedy	Don Taylor	
June 23, 1976	I Don't Want to Be Born	Horror	Peter Sasdy	
July 9, 1976	A Small Town in Texas	Crime	Jack Starrett	
July 30, 1976	Squirm	Horror	Jeff Lieberman	
July 1976	At the Earth's Core	Sci-fi fantasy	Kevin Connor	
July 1976	Special Delivery	Crime comedy	Paul Wendkos	
August 13, 1976	Futureworld	Sci-fi thriller	Richard T. Heffron	
August 25, 1976	J.D.'s Revenge	Blaxploitation	Arthur Marks	
September 17, 1976	Street People	Action	Maurizio Lucidi	
October 7, 1976	A Matter of Time	Musical	Vincente Minnelli	
October 8, 1976	Scorchy	Crime	Howard Avedis	
November 24, 1976	Shout at the Devil	War	Peter R. Hunt	
December 24, 1976	The Monkey Hustle	Blaxploitation	Arthur Marks	
December 24, 1976	The Town That Dreaded Sundown	Horror	Charles B. Pierce	
December 1976	Escape from Angola	Adventure	Leslie H. Martinson	
January 23, 1977	The Day That Shook the World	Historical drama	Veljko Bulajić	
February 2, 1977	Chatterbox	Sex comedy	Tom DeSimone	
February 11, 1977	Strange Shadows in an Empty Room	Crime	Alberto De Martino	
March 4, 1977	Death Weekend	Horror	William Fruet	
April 1, 1977	Breaker! Breaker!	Action	Don Hulette	
June 15, 1977	Tentacles	Horror	Ovidio G. Assonitis	
June 29, 1977	Empire of the Ants	Sci-fi horror	Bert I. Gordon	
July 6, 1977	The People That Time Forgot	Adventure fantasy	Kevin Connor	
July 13, 1977	The Island of Dr. Moreau	Sci-fi fantasy horror	Don Taylor	
August 10, 1977	The Little Girl Who Lives Down the Lane	Mystery thriller	Nicolas Gessner	
August 17, 1977	Joyride	Adventure crime comedy	Joseph Ruben	
August 31, 1977	Walking Tall: Final Chapter	Crime	Jack Starrett	
October 14, 1977	Rolling Thunder	Neo-noir	John Flynn	
December 28, 1977	Grayeagle	Western adventure	Charles B. Pierce	
December 1977	The Incredible Melting Man	Sci-fi horror	William Sachs	
December 1977	The Private Files of J. Edgar Hoover	Biographical drama	Larry Cohen	
February 1978	Record City	Comedy	Dennis Steinmetz	
March 1978	Last Cannibal World	Horror	Ruggero Deodato	
April 19, 1978	Holocaust 2000	Horror	Alberto De Martino	
May 13, 1978	Jennifer	Horror	Brice Mack	
May 24, 1978	Youngblood	Action	Noel Nosseck	
May 26, 1978	Here Come the Tigers	Sports comedy	Sean S. Cunningham	
May 26, 1978	High-Ballin'	Action comedy	Peter Carter	
May 1978	Our Winning Season	Drama	Joseph Ruben	
June 6, 1978	Cracking Up	Comedy	Rowby Goren Chuck Staley	
June 22, 1978	Matilda	Comedy	Daniel Mann	
June 1978	Who Can Kill a Child?	Spanish horror	Narciso Ibáñez Serrador	
July 14, 1978	Mean Dog Blues	Drama	Mel Stuart	
October 5, 1978	The Norsemen	Adventure	Charles B. Pierce	
December 8, 1978	Force 10 from Navarone	War	Guy Hamilton	
April 18, 1979	The Evictors	Crime horror	Charles B. Pierce	
April 27, 1979	Love at First Bite	Comedy horror	Stan Dragoti	
June 1, 1979	Sunnyside	Action	Timothy Galfas	
July 27, 1979	The Amityville Horror	Horror	Stuart Rosenberg	
September 14, 1979	California Dreaming	Comedy-drama	John D. Hancock	
September 1979	Seven	Action crime	Andy Sidaris	
October 5, 1979	Something Short of Paradise	Romantic comedy	David Helpern	
October 19, 1979	Meteor	Disaster	Ronald Neame	
November 1979	Jaguar Lives!	Action	Ernest Pintoff	
December 21, 1979	C.H.O.M.P.S.	Sci-fi comedy	Don Chaffey	

== 1980s ==
Release date	Title	Genre	Director	Notes
February 15, 1980	Mad Max	Action	George Miller	Australian sci-fi dystopian film dubbed in American English
March 14, 1980	Defiance	Action	John Flynn	
March 14, 1980	The Visitor	Sci-fi horror	Michael J. Paradise	Initially planned for AIP release, but sold off to independent distributor The International Picture Show; rights to the film would eventually come back full circle to MGM
March 28, 1980	Nothing Personal	Romantic comedy	George Bloomfield	
May 1, 1980	Gorp	Sex comedy	Joseph Ruben	Final film released under AIP banner
July 11, 1980	How to Beat the High Cost of Living	Crime comedy	Robert Scheerer	Released through Filmways Pictures
July 25, 1980	Dressed to Kill	Horror	Brian De Palma	Released through Filmways Pictures
January 1981	Underground Aces	Comedy	Robert Butler	Last AIP produced film until its resurrection on October 7, 2020, by MGM; released through Filmways Pictures

== 2020s ==
Release date	Title	Genre	Director	Notes
February 12, 2021	Breaking News in Yuba County	Comedy-crime-drama	Tate Taylor	First film following relaunch
July 20, 2021	How it Ends	Comedy-drama	Daryl Wein Zoe Lister-Jones	
August 24, 2021	Summer Days, Summer Nights	Comedy-drama	Edward Burns	
September 9, 2022	About Fate	Romantic comedy	Maryus Vaysberg	
September 22, 2022	Duetto	Drama	Vicente Amorim	Brazilian film
