= Invasion of the Star Creatures =

1962 film by Bruno VeSota

- Directed by: Bruno VeSota
- Written by: Jonathan Haze
- Produced by: Samuel Z. Arkoff; Berj Hagopian
- Starring: Bob Ball; Frankie Ray; Gloria Victor; Dolores Reed
- Cinematography: Basil Bradbury
- Edited by: Lew Guinn
- Distributed by: American International Pictures
- Release date: May 3, 1962
- Running time: 70 minutes (theatrical); 80 minutes (TV version)
- Country: United States
- Language: English

Invasion of the Star Creatures is an independently made 1962 black-and-white science fiction/comedy film, produced by Samuel Z. Arkoff and Berj Hagopian, directed by Bruno VeSota, that stars Bob Ball and Frankie Ray. The film was theatrically released by American International Pictures as a double feature with The Brain That Wouldn't Die.

The theatrical version (currently on DVD) runs 70 minutes. For television syndication, a 10-minute sequence was added, bringing the film's running time to 80 minutes.

== Plot ==
The film opens with a parody credit of “R.I. Diculous Presents". Private Philbrick and Private Penn are stuck in monotonous assignments at Fort Nicholson, a U.S. Army base near the Nicholson Mesa. The privates are assigned to a scouting mission that requires the inspection of a newly discovered cavern that was located near the base. Philbrick and Penn are part of an expeditionary squad, but become separated from their fellow soldiers. The privates are attacked by seven-foot-tall vegetable-like creatures that take them into the cavern, which is actually an alien base commanded by two statuesque women from the planet Kalar. The alien women, Dr. Puna and Professor Tanga, reveal that they arrived on Earth with the goal of conquering the planet. Philbrick and Penn find that their fellow soldiers have been placed in suspended animation by the aliens. Philbrick eventually discovers that kissing Puna leaves her temporarily powerless, allowing him and Penn to escape from the cavern and its inhabitants. After an encounter with an American Indian band, the two soldiers race back to their base to rally a defense of the Earth against the Kalar aliens. They succeed in saving the Earth by prematurely launching the alien spaceship, but are captured by the aliens. However, Puna convinces Tanga not to kill them as they have no way of returning home now and they need to rely on the two soldiers. Tanga accepts this, kisses Penn and the sparks fly. At the end of the film, the soldiers receive medals for their actions and they drive away with the aliens, now their wives.

== Cast ==
- Robert Ball as Pvt. Philbrick (credited as Bob Ball)
- Frank Ray Perilli as Pvt. Penn (credited as Frankie Ray)
- Joanne Arnold as Dr. Puna (credited as Gloria Victor)
- Dolores Reed as Prof. Tanga
- Trustin Howard as Sergeant (credited as Slick Slavin)
- Mark Ferris as Colonel Thomas Awol
- Jim Almanzer
- Anton Arnold
- Anton von Stralen
- Mark Thompson
- Allen Dailey

== Production ==
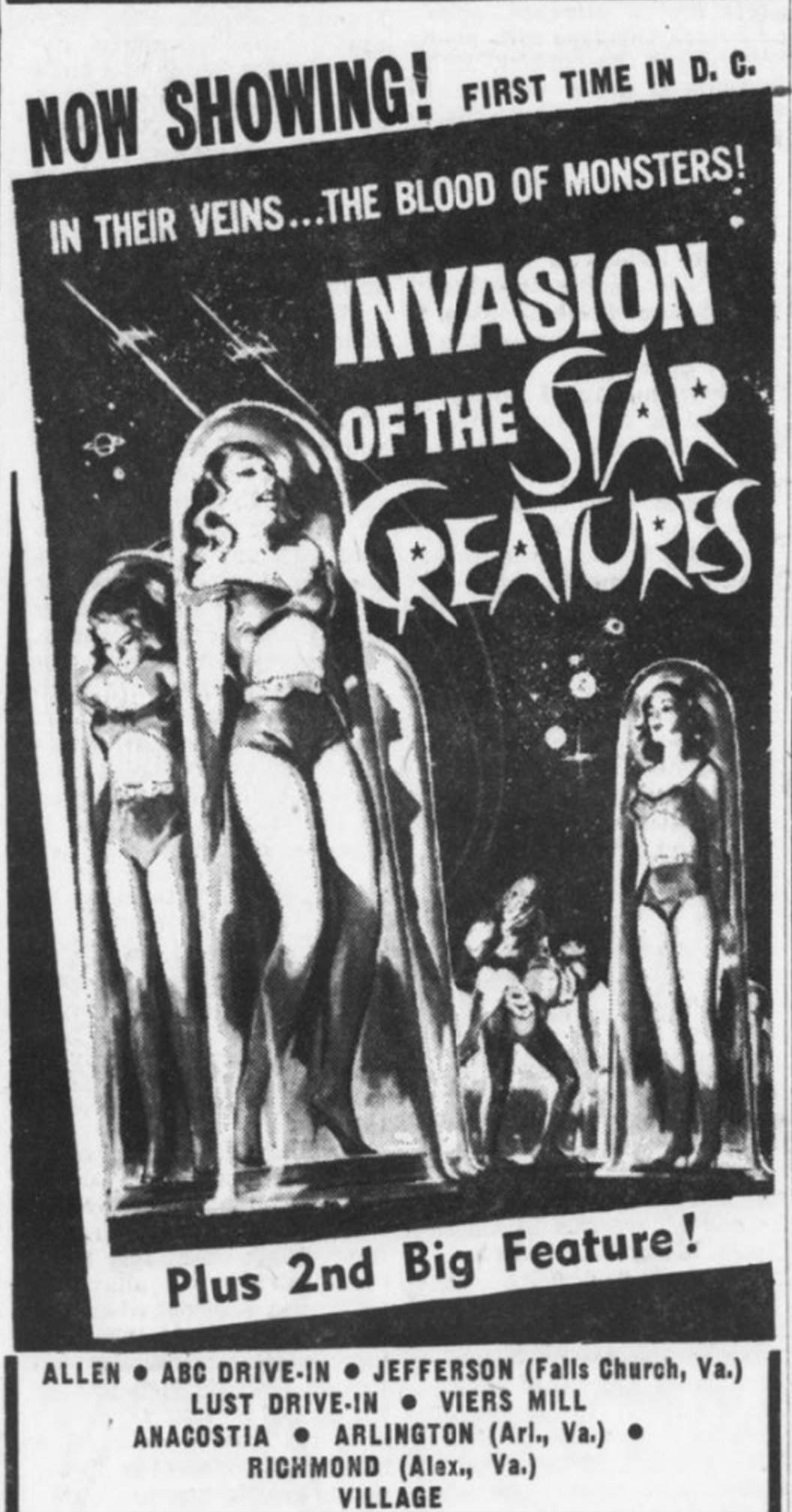
Theatrical advertisement from 1962

Invasion of the Star Creatures was written by Jonathan Haze, an actor best known for his starring role in the Roger Corman feature The Little Shop of Horrors (1960). Haze’s screenplay originally carried the title Monsters from Nicholson Mesa, which was intended as an inside joke reference to James H. Nicholson, the co-founder of American International Pictures. Haze was to star in the film, but he ultimately did not appear in the production.

It was Dolores Reed's last film before her death.

Director Bruno VeSota was best known for B-level features including Female Jungle (1955) and The Brain Eaters (1958).

The film opens with a parody credit of “R.I. Diculous Presents".

The film's cavern and desert scenes were shot in Bronson Canyon, a section of Griffith Park in Los Angeles, California, often used in film and television productions.

== Reception ==
Invasion of the Star Creatures has never been well reviewed by critics. When it first opened, the film trade magazine Box Office opined: “What a lot of baloney! Such a waste of time, film and effort. The title was good, but was it a spooky film? Nope! A comedy!! Closed the first night”. Film historian Bill Warren, in his 1996 book Keep Watching the Skies!, Vol. 2, called the film "astonishingly bad ... so helplessly bad that it's almost unwatchable".

In 1979, the film was cited by Harry and Michael Medved in their book The Golden Turkey Awards, a tribute to bad films. Invasion of the Star Creatures was nominated in the category for “The Worst Vegetable Movie of All Time”, with the authors noting the monsters controlled by the Kalar aliens were played by actors wearing carrot costumes. The Medveds also faulted an egregious comic line by Bob Ball – when given a back flip by one of the carrot monsters, Ball remarked: “Wow, that’s the first time a salad ever tossed me”!
