= Art Lund =

American singer and actor (1915–1990)

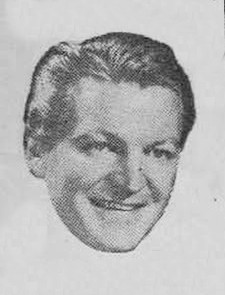
Lund, c. 1950

Arthur Lund (April 1, 1915 – May 31, 1990) was an American baritone singer, initially with bandleaders Benny Goodman and Harry James, and was also a television and stage actor.

== Biography ==
Arthur Lund was a graduate of Eastern Kentucky University, and received his master's degree from the United States Naval Academy in aerological engineering.

Lund was a high school math teacher in Kentucky who worked as a musician on the side. He left teaching to tour with Jimmy Ray and his band. He originally billed himself as Art London.

He found work early on as a vocalist with a band led by clarinetist Jimmy Joy. A better-known clarinetist whom Lund would later sing with was Benny Goodman, with whom he cut several records, including “Blue Skies,” “On the Alamo,” and (in duet with Peggy Lee) “Winter Weather” and “If You Build a Better Mousetrap”. In addition to his work with the King of Swing, Lund sang and recorded with bandmaster and trumpet king Harry James.

He began a solo career in 1946, recording the song "Mam'selle" in 1947. This gramophone record was #1 in the U.S. Billboard magazine chart and earned a gold disc. Other hits for Lund were "On a Slow Boat to China", "What'll I Do", "You Call Everybody Darlin'" and "Peg o' My Heart". He also recorded "Blue Skies", "My Blue Heaven" and "Mona Lisa".

Lund had lead roles on Broadway in The Most Happy Fella (1956); Destry Rides Again (1959), as a replacement for the plot's villain, Scott Brady; Donnybrook! (1961); Fiorello! (1962); and Sophie (1963). Lund also worked in two shows that closed before scheduled Broadway openings, We Take the Town (1962), as Robert Preston's standby; and Breakfast at Tiffany's (1966). His film credits included The Molly Maguires (1970), Black Caesar (1973), The Last American Hero (1973), Bucktown (1975), Baby Blue Marine (1976), The Private Files of J. Edgar Hoover (1977) and It's Alive III: Island of the Alive (1987).

On television, he played “Heber”, a gambler who bets on the death of a made-up outlaw on James Arness's TV Western Gunsmoke (1962), in S8E15's “False Front”. Lund also recorded the theme to the 1965 TV series Branded starring Chuck Conners.

== Personal life and death ==
Lund was born in Salt Lake City.

Lund was married for nearly 30 years (1940–1969) to Kathleen Virginia Bolanz-Lund. On October 16, 1969, Kathleen Lund was killed in an automobile accident. She was a passenger in a car driven by friend and former model/actress Rosemarie Bowe (wife of actor Robert Stack), when the car veered into a culvert near Sacramento Metropolitan Airport. Lund did not remarry until the last year of his life, to Janet Burris Chytraus. Art Lund died on May 31, 1990, in his native Utah. He was 75. At the time of his death, Lund was survived by wife Janet, a daughter, Kathleen Ann Olson of Canoga Park, California; a son, Arthur Earl Lund III of Pittsburgh; a sister, Ruth Glover, a grandson and two granddaughters. Lund was a Mormon.

== Awards ==
Lund has a star on the Hollywood Walk of Fame, at 6126 Hollywood Boulevard.

== Filmography ==
Year	Title	Role	Notes
1970	The Molly Maguires	Frazier	
1971	Head On	Koger	
1973	Black Caesar	Captain Jack McKinney	
1973	Brother on the Run		Uncredited
1973	The Last American Hero	Elroy Jackson Sr.	
1975	Bucktown	Chief Patterson	
1976	Baby Blue Marine	Mr. Elmore	
1977	The Private Files of J. Edgar Hoover	Benchley	
1987	It's Alive III: Island of the Alive	Dr. Swenson	(final film role)

== See also ==
- List of stars on the Hollywood Walk of Fame
