= Thalmus Rasulala =

American actor (1939–1991)

- Rasulala in 1971
- Born: Jack Crowder; November 15, 1939; Miami, Florida, U.S.
- Died: October 9, 1991 (aged 51); Albuquerque, New Mexico, U.S.
- Occupation: Actor
- Years active: 1970–1991
- Spouse(s): Martha Roberts (m. 1960; div. 1977) Shirlyn Mozingo (m. 1984)
- Children: 7

Thalmus Rasulala (born Jack Crowder; November 15, 1939 – October 9, 1991) was an American actor with a long career in theater, television, and films. Noted for starring roles in blaxploitation films, he was also an original cast member of ABC's soap opera One Life to Live from its premiere in 1968 until he left the show in 1970.

== Life and career ==
Born Jack Crowder in Miami, Florida, and a graduate of the University of Redlands, he appeared in many films and made guest appearances on television shows. He also attended some classes at Shaw University, a historically black university in Raleigh, North Carolina in the late 1970s. Notable blaxploitation film roles include Sidney Lord Jones in Cool Breeze (1972), Dr. Gordon Thomas in Blacula (1972) and Robert Daniels in Willie Dynamite (1974); he also was the assistant director of The Slams (1973). On television, he was known as Skeeter Matthews on Sanford and Son, Ned in The Autobiography of Miss Jane Pittman, Lt. Jack Neal on One Life to Live, Bill Thomas (Raj and Dee's father) on What's Happening!!, and Omoro Kinte (Kunta Kinte's father) in Roots. He also appeared on the first-season episode of Saturday Night Live hosted by Richard Pryor as a priest in the "Exorcist II" sketch.

On the Broadway stage, under his original name Jack Crowder, Rasulala appeared as Cornelius Hackl in the hit musical Hello, Dolly!. He was a leading member of the all-black cast that starred Pearl Bailey and Cab Calloway. The Bailey company opened on Broadway on November 12, 1967, and was recorded by RCA Victor for a best-selling cast album in which Rasulala is featured in several songs.

He also appeared on Perry Mason, Mannix, The Twilight Zone, All in the Family, The Jeffersons, Tales of Wells Fargo, Good Times, Star Trek: The Next Generation, and The Sophisticated Gents. His other film roles include Cornbread, Earl and Me (1975), Mr. Ricco (1975), Bucktown (1975), The Last Hard Men (1976), For Us the Living: The Medgar Evers Story (1983), The Boss' Wife (1986), and New Jack City (1991).

== Personal life and death ==
Crowder changed his name in the early 1970s to Thalmus Rasulala after his conversion to Islam. He married Shirlyn Mozingo on November 6, 1984. He died on October 9, 1991, from a heart attack in Albuquerque, New Mexico. He was survived by his wife Shirlyn, and their four children. He was previously married to Martha Roberts, whom he wed in 1960, they had three children together; they divorced in 1977. His final film role was as General Afir in the comedy film Mom and Dad Save the World. He died shortly after completing his scenes, and the film, released a year after his death, is dedicated to his memory. Rasulala's death was two days before that of actor Redd Foxx, who died of a heart attack and with whom he guest-starred on Sanford & Son. In the episode, Foxx solicited funds for heart attack prevention and awareness.

However, Judgement, also known as Hitz, can also be considered Rasulala's last film in his career as it was also released posthumously but made during his lifetime.

== Partial filmography ==
- The Out-of-Towners (1970) - Police Officer
- Cool Breeze (1972) - Sidney Lord Jones
- Blacula (1972) - Dr. Gordon Thomas
- Willie Dynamite (1973) - Robert Daniels
- The Autobiography of Miss Jane Pittman (1974) - Ned
- Mr. Ricco (1975) - Frankie Steele
- Cornbread, Earl and Me (1975) - Charlie
- Bucktown (1975) - Roy
- Friday Foster (1975) - Blake Tarr
- Adiós Amigo (1976) - Noah
- The Last Hard Men (1976) - Weed
- Roots (1977) - Omoro Kinte, father of Kunta Kinte
- Fun with Dick and Jane (1977) - Food Stamp Man (social worker)
- The Incredible Hulk (1978) - Deputy Chief Harry Simon
- Born American (1986) - The Admiral
- The Boss' Wife (1986) - Barney
- The Defiant Ones (1986) - Fred
- Bulletproof (1988) - Billy Dunbar
- Above the Law (1988) - Deputy Superintendent Crowder
- Star Trek: The Next Generation (1989), episode "Contagion" - Captain Donald Varley
- The Package (1989) - Secret Service Commander
- Lambada (1990) - Wesley Wilson
- New Jack City (1991) - Police Commissioner Fred Price
- Life on the Edge (1992) - Truman Brown
- Mom and Dad Save the World (1992) - General Afir
- Judgement (1992) - Judge Jackson (completed in 1988)
