= Shelley Berman =

American comedian, actor, writer and teacher (1925–2017)

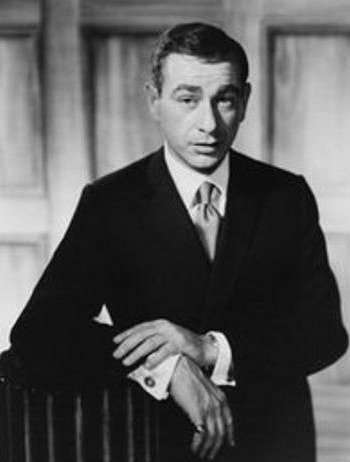
- Berman in the 1960s
- Born: Sheldon Leonard Berman; February 3, 1925; Chicago, Illinois, U.S.
- Died: September 1, 2017 (aged 92); Bell Canyon, California, U.S.
- Resting place: Hillside Memorial Park Cemetery; Culver City, California
- Education: Art Institute of Chicago (BFA)
- Occupations: Comedian; actor; writer; teacher; lecturer
- Years active: 1954–2014
- Spouse: Sarah Herman (m. 1947)
- Children: 2

Comedy career
- Medium: Stand-up; film; television
- Genre: Observational comedy
- Website: shelleyberman.com

Sheldon Leonard Berman (February 3, 1925 – September 1, 2017) was an American comedian, actor, writer, teacher, and lecturer.

He was awarded four gold records for his comedy albums and he won the first Grammy Award for a spoken comedy recording in 1959. In 2008 he was nominated for an Emmy Award for his portrayal of Larry David's father on Curb Your Enthusiasm.

Berman taught humor writing at the University of Southern California for more than 20 years.

== Early life and education ==
Berman was born in Chicago, the son of Irene (née Marks) and Nathan Berman. He was Jewish. He had a younger brother, Ronald.

He served in the Navy during World War II, after which he enrolled in Chicago's Goodman School of Drama at the Art Institute of Chicago (now at DePaul University) as a drama student. There he met fellow student Sarah Herman, whom he married in 1947. His career began with an acting company in Woodstock, Illinois, and in 1949 he and his wife made their way to New York City. He studied acting at the HB Studio and made ends meet as a social director, cab driver, speech teacher, assistant manager of a drug store, and a dance instructor at Arthur Murray Dance Studios. Later, Berman found work as a sketch writer for The Steve Allen Plymouth Show.

== Career ==
=== Early career ===
Berman began as a straight actor, receiving his training at the Goodman Theatre in Chicago, performing in stock companies in and around Chicago and New York City.

In the mid-1950s, he became a member of Chicago's Compass Players, which later evolved into The Second City. While performing improvised sketches with Compass, Berman began to develop solo pieces, often employing an imaginary telephone to take the place of an onstage partner.

=== Nightclubs and live performances ===
In 1957, Berman was hired as a comedian at Mister Kelly's in Chicago, which led to other nightclub bookings, and a recording contract with Verve Records. His comedy albums earned him three gold records and his debut, Inside Shelley Berman, won the first Grammy Award for Best Comedy Performance - Spoken. Berman appeared on numerous television specials and all of the major variety shows of the day.

He starred on Broadway in A Family Affair and continued with stage work in The Odd Couple, Damn Yankees, Where's Charley?, Fiddler on the Roof, Two by Two, I'm Not Rappaport, La Cage aux Folles, The Prisoner of Second Avenue and Guys & Dolls. On March 12, 1961 he became the first stand-up comedian to perform at Carnegie Hall.

Berman's voice was the inspiration for the voice of the Hanna-Barbera cartoon character Fibber Fox, performed by Daws Butler.

=== Television career ===
Berman performed both comedic and dramatic roles on television, including appearances on episodes of The Twilight Zone (both radio and TV versions), Rawhide; Bewitched; Peter Gunn; The Mary Tyler Moore Show; Adam-12; Emergency!; Brothers; Night Court; MacGyver; L.A. Law; Friends; Walker, Texas Ranger; The King of Queens; Grey's Anatomy; Boston Legal; Lizzie McGuire; Hannah Montana; CSI: NY; and the revived Hawaii Five-0.

He made some appearances as a panelist and one as the "Mystery Guest" on the CBS game show What's My Line in the early and mid-1960s. He also had a recurring role on the short-lived sitcom Walter & Emily. From 2002 to 2009 he appeared as Larry David's father on Curb Your Enthusiasm, a role for which he was nominated for an Emmy Award in 2008.

=== Film career ===
Among Berman's film credits are Dementia (1955, with Shorty Rogers), The Best Man (1964, with Henry Fonda and Cliff Robertson), Divorce American Style (1967, with Dick Van Dyke and Debbie Reynolds), Every Home Should Have One (1970, with Marty Feldman), Beware! The Blob (1972, with Robert Walker Jr.), Rented Lips (1988, with Martin Mull and Robert Downey Jr.), Teen Witch (1989, with Robyn Lively and Zelda Rubinstein), The Last Producer (2000, with Burt Reynolds), Meet the Fockers (2004, with Robert De Niro and Ben Stiller), The Holiday (2006, with Cameron Diaz), and You Don't Mess with the Zohan (2008, with Adam Sandler).

=== Late career ===
For over 20 years, Berman was a lecturer (later lecturer emeritus) in humor writing in the Master of Professional Writing program at the University of Southern California. He was also a teacher for the Improv Olympics program.

== Personal life ==
Berman married Sarah Herman on April 19, 1947. The two met while they were studying acting at Chicago's Goodman Theatre.

In the mid-1960s, Berman and wife Sarah adopted two children, son Joshua and daughter Rachel. The Bermans were planning Joshua's bar mitzvah when he was diagnosed with a brain tumor. Joshua died on October 29, 1977, at age 12.

Berman and his wife were supporters of the Motion Picture and Television Fund (located in Woodland Hills, California), a charitable organization that offers assistance and care to those in the motion picture and television industries with little or no resources, and contributed their time and resources to benefit the facilities and the residents.

In the 1980s, the Chamber of Commerce in Canoga Park, California selected Berman as one of the celebrities to serve a term as honorary mayor of Canoga Park.

=== Allegation of plagiarism ===
In a 2012 podcast interview with Marc Maron, Berman alleged that comedian Bob Newhart plagiarized his improvisational telephone routine style, describing its genesis and saying it was a "very special technique that couldn't really be imitated. It could be stolen. And it was." "I was coming to work at night and a guy stopped his car, passed me by, and said 'Hey, Shelley! There's a guy [who] stole your act!'" When asked by Maron if it was done maliciously, Berman replied, "Maliciously? He wouldn't do it maliciously. Nobody does that. But he did it to make a living. And he became a star."

When asked by The A.V. Club about the telephone issue, Newhart said:

Shelley Berman did it before I did it. Mike (Nichols) and Elaine (May) did a version of it. There was a thing called "Cohen on the Telephone", which was a very, very early recording by Edison [Records] of a guy on the phone.

According to The New York Times,

"George Jessel had a radio show," Mr. Newhart recalled. "At the end, he would call up his mother and tell her how the show had gone. As a kid growing up, I remember listening to him and he would call his mother up and say, 'Mama, this is Georgie'" – he paused, skillfully – "'from the money.'"

Newhart cited other influences on his comedy, rather than Berman -- most notably Jack Benny and Bob and Ray.

== Death ==
Berman died from complications from Alzheimer's disease at his home in Bell Canyon, California, in the early morning of September 1, 2017. He was 92 years old. His archive was donated to the National Comedy Center in Jamestown, New York.

Comedian Steve Martin praised Berman on Twitter, thanking him for "changing modern stand-up [comedy]". Marc Maron also tweeted "Shelley Berman has hung up the phone. RIP. The guy who inspired me to sit. Great comic."

== Works ==
=== Film ===
Year	Title	Role	Notes	Ref.
1955	Dementia	Stoned Beatnik	Uncredited	
1964	The Best Man	Sheldon Bascomb		
1967	Divorce American Style	David Grieff		
1970	Every Home Should Have One	Nat Kaplan		
1972	Beware! The Blob	Hair Stylist		
1988	Rented Lips	Bill Slotnik		
1989	Teen Witch	Mr. Weaver		
1990	Elliot Fauman, Ph.D.	Stromberg		
1991	Motorama	Million Dollar Driver		
2000	The Last Producer	Poker Player #1		
2004	Meet the Fockers	Judge Ira		
2006	The Holiday	Norman		
2008	You Don't Mess with the Zohan	Zohan's Father		
2010	The Legend of Secret Pass	Ira (voice)		

=== Television ===
Year	Title	Role	Notes
1954	The Repertory Theatre	Sheldon Berman	Episode: "Time of Delivery"
1955	Goodyear Playhouse	Manager	Episode: "The Catered Affair"
1959	Peter Gunn	Danny Holland	Episode: "The Comic"
1961	The Twilight Zone	Archibald Beechcroft	Episode: "The Mind and the Matter"
1961	General Electric Theater	Stanley	Episode: "The $200 Parlay"
1961	Car 54, Where Are You?	Rabbi Einsenberg	Episode: "Catch Me on the Paar Show"; Episode: "See You at the Bar Mitzvah"
1962	Rawhide	Mendel Sorkin	Episode: "The Peddler"
1963	Breaking Point	Roy Chase	Episode: "Whatsoever Things I Hear"
1964	Burke's Law	King Dmitri	Episode: "Who Killed Cassandra Cass?"
1964	Bewitched	Mr. Brinkman	Episode: "The Witches Are Out"
1966	Mister Roberts	Performer	Episode: "The Replacement"
1966	The Man from U.N.C.L.E.	Sheldon Veblen	Episode: "The Super Colossal Affair"
1966	The Hero	Performer	Episode: "The Truth Never Hurts"
1967	The Girl From U.N.C.L.E.	Doctor Toulouse	Episode: "The Moulin Ruse Affair"
1967	Get Smart	Elwood Box	Episode: "Classification: Dead"
1968–69	That's Life	Mr. Quigley	6 episodes
1969	The Tommy Leonetti Show	Performer	1 episode
1970	The Mary Tyler Moore Show	Dr. Walter Udall	Episode: "Divorce Isn't Everything"
1971	Adam-12	Phil Duke	Episode: "Log 165: Once a Cop"
1970–71	Love, American Style	Various Roles	3 episodes
1974	Emergency!	Art Frommich	Episode: "The Screenwriter"
1975	Police Woman	Eddie Bender	Episode: "The Company"
1977	Forever Fernwood	Mel Beach	1 episode
1978	Vega$	Mickey	Episode: "Milliken's Stash"
1978	Flying High	Phil	Episode: "High Rollers"
1979	Brenda Starr, Reporter	A.J. Livwright	Television Movie
1979	Eischied	Performer	Episode: "Angels of Terror"
1978–81	CHiPs	Strum/Desperate Car Owner	2 episodes
1983	Matt Houston	Dickie Bevak	Episode: "The Yacht Club Murders"
1984	Brothers	Marcus	2 episodes
1985	Hotel	Barney	Episode: "Obsession"
1985	Knight Rider	Josh Bevin	Episode: "Knight Song"
1987	St. Elsewhere	Bill Belvedere	Episode: "Getting Ahead"
1987	The New Mike Hammer	Comedian	Episode: "The Last Laugh"
1987	CBS Summer Playhouse	Harry	Episode: "Mabel and Max"
1987	ABC Afterschool Special	Harold	Episode: "The Kid Who Wouldn't Quit"
1988	Night Court	Al	Episode: "I'm OK, You're Catatonic"
1989	What's Alan Watching?	Mel Krasoen	Television Special
1989	The Munsters Today	Sam Hawkins	Episode: "The Trial"
1990	What a Dummy	Grandpa Lou	Episode: "Grandpa Lou"
1991	Monsters	Leo Tandoski	Episode: "Werewolf of Hollywood"
1991	MacGyver	CIA-Agent Abe	Episode: "Honest Abe"
1991	Walter & Emily	Albert	1 Episode
1992	Carol Leifer: Gaudy, Bawdy & Blue	Himself	Television Movie
1992	Civil Wars	Performer	Episode: "The Triumph of DeVille"
1992–93	L.A. Law	Ben Flicker	6 episodes
1994	Garfield and Friends	Dick Drake (voice)	Episode: "Horror Hostess"
1995	Living Single	Hyman	Episode: "Baby I'm Back...Again"
1996–97	Friends	Mr. Kaplan Jr.	2 episodes
1997	Chicago Sons	McGlashan	Episode: "The Things We Do for Love"
1997	The Blues Brothers Animated Series	Alderman J. Alderman (voice)	8 episodes
1998	Arlis$$	Ollie Fogle	Episode: "The American Game"
1999	L.A. Doctors	Performer	Episode: "Been There, Done That'"
2000	Providence	Performer	Episode: "Syd in Wonderland"
2000	Walker, Texas Ranger	Ira Goldberg	Episode: "Lazarus"
2001	That's My Bush!	Principal	Episode: "Fare Thee Welfare"
2002	Lizzie McGuire	Nobby Frostybump	Episode: "Xtreme Xmas"
2002	Even Stevens	Jackie the Janitor	Episode: "Dirty Work"
2003	The King of Queens	Skitch	Episode: "Queens'bro Bridge"
2004	Dead Like Me	Theo	Episode: "The Shallow End"
2005	Grey's Anatomy	Jed Sorento	Episode: "Let it Be"
2007	Entourage	Uncle Shelley	Episode: "Return of the King"
2007	State of Mind	Harvey Fleischman	Episode: "Passion Fishing"
2006–08	Boston Legal	Judge Robert Sanders	11 episodes
2008	Hannah Montana	Dr. Froman	Episode: "Don't Go Breakin' My Tooth"
2008	Pushing Daisies	Gustav Hofer	Episode: "Robbing Hood"
2009	CSI: NY	George Savar	Episode: "Yahrzeit"
2009	The Unusuals	Tom Speigelman	Episode: "The Tape Delay"
2009	Raising the Bar	Danny Rose	Episode: "Rules of Engagement"
2002–09	Curb Your Enthusiasm	Nat David	13 episodes
2012	Hawaii Five-0	Morty Sapperstein	Episode: "Ohuna"

=== Theatre ===
Year	Title	Role	Venue	Ref.
1959	The Girls Against the Boys	Husband	Alvin Theatre	
1962	A Family Affair	Alfie Nathan	Billy Rose Theatre	
1973–74	The Prisoner of Second Avenue	Mel Edison	National Tour	
1980	Insideoutsideandallaround with Shelley Berman	Playwright-Performer	Bijou Theatre	

=== Albums ===
Berman released the following albums:

Year	Title	Peak chart positions	
Year	Title	US 200	Cashbox Top LPs
1959	Inside Shelley Berman	2	2
1959	Outside Shelley Berman	6	4
1960	The Edge of Shelley Berman	4	6
1961	A Personal Appearance	25	25
1963	New Sides	—	—
1964	The Sex Life of The Primate (And Other Bits of Gossip)	88	67
1965	Let Me Tell You a Funny Story	—	—
1995	Live Again! Recorded at the Improv	—	—
2013	To Laughter with Questions	—	—
2013	When Jews Were Funny	—	—

=== Bibliography ===
- Cleans and Dirtys (1966)
- A Hotel Is a Place ... (1972)
- Up in the Air With Shelley Berman (1986)
- To Laughter With Questions (2013)

== Awards and nominations ==
Year	Award	Category	Nominated work	Result	Ref.
1959	Grammy Awards	Best Comedy Performance – Spoken Word	Inside Shelley Berman	Won	
1960	Grammy Awards	Best Comedy Performance – Spoken Word	The Edge of Shelley Berman	Nominated	
2008	Primetime Emmy Awards	Outstanding Guest Actor in a Comedy Series	Curb Your Enthusiasm	Nominated	
2005	Screen Actors Guild Awards	Outstanding Performance by an Ensemble in a Comedy Series	Curb Your Enthusiasm	Nominated	
