= Mr. Ricco =

1975 film by Paul Bogart

- Directed by: Paul Bogart
- Written by: Robert Hoban (screenplay); Ed Harvey; Francis Kiernan (story)
- Produced by: Douglas Netter
- Starring: Dean Martin; Eugene Roche; Thalmus Rasulala
- Cinematography: Frank Stanley
- Edited by: Michael S. McLean
- Music by: Chico Hamilton
- Production company: Metro-Goldwyn-Mayer
- Distributed by: United Artists (United States and Canada); Cinema International Corporation (International)
- Release date: January 29, 1975 (New York City)
- Running time: 99 minutes
- Country: United States
- Language: English

Mr. Ricco is a 1975 crime drama film directed by Paul Bogart and starring Dean Martin in his last leading film role, along with Eugene Roche, Denise Nicholas and Cindy Williams.

== Plot ==
A murder charge is dropped against San Francisco black militant Frankie Steele, who is represented by liberal attorney Joe Ricco.

Two police officers are then gunned down. An eyewitness, the young son of a friend of Ricco's, identifies Steele as the man he saw leaving the scene of the crime.

Ricco is a lonely widower. He has a loyal secretary and a dog. His closest friend is George Cronyn, the detective in charge of the case. Cronyn is irate that Steele got away with killing a woman, Mary Justin, resulting in the deaths of two of his fellow officers.

Cronyn and his men raid a hideout of Steele's organization, the Black Serpents. But while Steele manages to get away, a racist cop named Tanner kills the unarmed Calvin Mapes and plants a gun on him, then arrests his brother, Purvis Mapes.

Their sister, Irene Mapes, who works in an art gallery, asks Ricco if he would be Purvis's lawyer. He agrees and uncovers evidence that Tanner was at fault. In exchange, Ricco persuades Purvis to reveal where the fugitive Frankie Steele can be found.

Irene invites Ricco to the opening of a new art exhibit. Ricco also meets a woman, Katherine, with whom he becomes romantically involved.

A sniper tries to shoot Ricco in his home. A neighbor, an old woman with poor eyesight, sees a man who once again resembles Steele. After a second attempt on his life, Cronyn assigns a cop named Barrett to tail Ricco wherever he goes. It makes no sense to Ricco, though, that Steele would want to kill his own lawyer.

Ricco shakes the tail because he promised Purvis Mapes not to reveal Steele's whereabouts. He goes to a church and finds Steele, who denies killing the cops but blurts out that he did indeed murder the woman Mary Justin. A fistfight between the two men results, landing Ricco in the hospital.

Regretting that he got a guilty man off, Ricco apologizes to Mary Justin's brother, who doesn't accept it, angrily accusing Ricco of being "an accessory." The racist cop Tanner is then found murdered. Ricco is relieved when Cronyn's men apprehend Steele.

He goes to the black-tie affair at the art gallery, taking Katherine as his date and letting Barrett tag along. A sniper appears and takes aim. He hits Katherine by mistake, then shoots Barrett as well. Ricco grabs the cop's gun and gives chase. The killer wounds more cops before a shot by Ricco drops him. It is clearly Steele, but when the body is examined, it turns out to be Mary Justin's brother wearing a disguise.

== Cast ==
- Dean Martin as Joe Ricco
- Eugene Roche as George Cronyn
- Thalmus Rasulala as Frankie Steele
- Denise Nicholas as Irene Mapes
- Cindy Williams as Jamison
- Geraldine Brooks as Katherine
- Philip Michael Thomas as Purvis Mapes
- George Tyne as Lt. Barrett
- John Quade as Arkansas

== Production ==
Dean Martin appeared in Mr. Ricco as his contract for appearing at the MGM Grand Hotel in Las Vegas included a commitment to star in a film for the hotel's parent company, Metro-Goldwyn-Mayer. Paul Bogart signed to direct the film in early 1974, at which stage the film was called Ricco.

== Reception ==
Roger Ebert of the Chicago Sun-Times gave the film one-and-a-half stars out of four and wrote, "'Mr. Ricco' keeps us waiting through two hours of yawn inducing 'suspense' for an ending that's totally off the wall. There's no way to foresee it, the clues hinting at it make sense only in retrospect, and we leave feeling cheated."

Gene Siskel of the Chicago Tribune awarded the same one-and-a-half star grade and stated, "Lackluster action (even the chase sequence is tepid) reveals the story as hackneyed for the black movie market. Dino seems hopelessly out of place without a backup chorus line of bikinied broads; the camera often catches him smiling when he should be scowling."

Vincent Canby of The New York Times called it "a very bad urban melodrama," adding, "Everything about the character Mr. Martin plays, a man named Ricco, looks like displaced Southern California: the tan, the hair-set and even the boredom, which suggests the fellow wants to get back to that old gang of his in the Polo Lounge as quickly as possible."

Arthur D. Murphy of Variety panned the film as "a total waste of money. The film is a tedious and corny hodgepodge about a San Francisco criminal attorney whose client is suspected of murder. Compounded cliches and fatuous dramaturgy run amok in Douglas Netter's otherwise good-looking location production."

Linda Gross of the Los Angeles Times called the film "a lethargic, mediocre melodrama," adding that "Paul Bogart's stiff direction suffers from the same low energy level that stifles the rest of the movie."

Tom Milne of The Monthly Film Bulletin wrote that "Mr. Ricco never quite manages to pull itself together. Wandering nonchalantly through his customary relaxed charm routine with the aid of a shaggy dog who tactfully retrieves mis-hit balls on the golf course and provides some comic asides with the outraged owner of a virginal poodle next door, Dean Martin coolly belies the supposed atmosphere of racial tension the script works so hard to suggest."

The film holds a rating of 36% on Rotten Tomatoes from 22 reviews with the consensus summarizing: "Mr. Ricco is a sluggish, credibility-stretching legal thriller weighed down by Dean Martin's lifeless performance and a painfully slow buildup."
