= Tierre Turner =

American actor and stuntperson (born 1960)

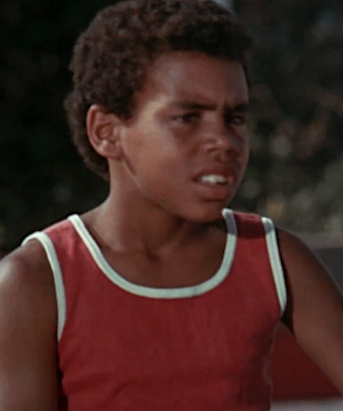
- Turner in Cornbread, Earl and Me (1975)
- Born: January 7, 1960 (age 65); Detroit, Michigan, U.S.
- Occupation(s): Actor, stuntperson
- Years active: 1973–present

Tierre Turner (born January 7, 1960) is an American actor and stuntperson who began his career as a child actor in the 1970s. His feature film debut was the horror film People Toys (1974), followed by the television drama film The Runaways (1975). Turner also had supporting roles in several blaxploitation films in the 1970s, including Bucktown and Friday Foster (1975), both starring Pam Grier. He also portrayed the lead role of Lucas Adams on the television series The Cop and the Kid opposite Charles Durning from 1975 to 1976.

Since the 1980s, Turner has worked extensively as a stunt performer and stunt coordinator on a variety of feature films, including Training Day (2001), Stuck on You (2003), and The Three Stooges (2012).

== Biography ==
Turner was born January 7, 1960 in Detroit, Michigan. His brother, Dain Turner, is also an actor and stuntperson. His first feature film role was as one of several murderous children in the slasher film People Toys (1974), also known as Devil Times Five. He subsequently had supporting roles in several blaxploitation films, including Bucktown and Friday Foster (1975), both starring Pam Grier. He also appeared in a supporting role as the friend of Laurence Fishburne's character in the drama Cornbread, Earl and Me (also 1975).

From 1975 to 1976, Turner starred opposite Charles Durning in the comedy series The Cop and the Kid.

Since the 1980s, Turner has worked as a stunt performer for numerous feature films, including Where's Marlowe? (1998), Training Day (2001), The Fighting Temptations (2003), Stuck on You (2003), and The Three Stooges (2012).

== Select filmography ==
=== Film ===
Year	Title	Role	Notes	Ref.
1974	People Toys	Brian	Alternate title: Devil Times Five	
1975	The Runaways	Bob Davis	Television film	
1975	Cornbread, Earl and Me	Earl Carter		
1975	Bucktown	Steve		
1975	Friday Foster	Cleve		
1991	One Good Cop	First Hood		
1994	The Crow	'Jugger'		
2017	CHiPs	Tow Truck Driver		

=== Television ===
Year	Title	Role	Notes	Ref.
1973	McCloud	Tobe	Episode: "The Million Dollar Round Up"	
1975	That's My Mama	Jimmy	Episode: "Clifton and the Kid"	
1976	The Bob Newhart Show	Wally Carson	Episode: "Send This Boy to Camp"	
1975–1976	The Cop and the Kid	Lucas Adams	13 episodes	
1978	The Waverly Wonders	'Hasty' Parks	9 episodes	
1994–1995	Earth 2	'Zero'	21 episodes	
