= Mom and Dad Save the World =

1992 film by Greg Beeman

- Theatrical release poster
- Directed by: Greg Beeman
- Written by: Chris Matheson; Ed Solomon
- Produced by: Michael Phillips
- Starring: Teri Garr; Jeffrey Jones; Jon Lovitz; Dwier Brown; Kathy Ireland; Thalmus Rasulala; Wallace Shawn; Eric Idle
- Cinematography: Jacques Haitkin
- Edited by: W.O. Garrett
- Music by: Jerry Goldsmith
- Production companies: HBO; Cinema Plus L.P.
- Distributed by: Warner Bros.
- Release date: July 24, 1992
- Running time: 88 minutes
- Country: United States
- Language: English
- Budget: $14 million
- Box office: $2 million

Mom and Dad Save the World is a 1992 American comedy film directed by Greg Beeman. A parody of science fiction films, the film stars Teri Garr and Jeffrey Jones as Marge and Dick Nelson, a married Earth couple who are kidnapped by Tod (Jon Lovitz), the cruel, inept and over-dramatic emperor of Spengo, a "planet of idiots". The film also stars Dwier Brown, Kathy Ireland, Thalmus Rasulala, Wallace Shawn and Eric Idle. Rasulala died shortly after completing his scenes, and the film is dedicated to his memory.

== Plot ==
Emperor Tod Spengo, with General Afir at his side, takes over a small planet at the edge of the galaxy populated entirely by idiots, and renames it after himself. He has all the resources of the planet engaged to create his "Super Death Ray Laser" to destroy Earth, thus making Spengo the greatest planet in the Universe. When Spengo peeks at the laser's planned point of impact (a Southern California suburb), he beholds housewife Marge Nelson and becomes instantly infatuated with her. Using his Magnobeam (a giant magnet), he kidnaps Marge and her husband Dick on their way to their 20th-anniversary weekend, hoping to make Marge his wife.

Dick and Marge get separated on Spengo, and are waited on by servants with fish or bulldog heads. Marge is sent to the lap of luxury, while Dick is thrown into a dungeon. In his cell, Dick meets the rightful ruler of Spengo, King Raff, who gives him plans for his son, called the White Bird, leader of a band of rebels out in the desert. In the meantime, Spengo finds that his advances towards Marge are failing, so he tries to read Dick's mind in order to discover the secret to her heart before having him executed. Upon witnessing Dick's devotion to Marge, Spengo's interrogator, Sibor, has a change of heart and helps Dick escape. Despite the stupidity of his captors, Dick is soon discovered and forced down a garbage chute to the sewers, where he encounters a pack of carnivorous mushroom-like creatures called Lub-Lubs and is forced to run for his life.

Dick manages to escape the sewers and steal an escape pod, and winds up crashing in the desert, where he meets the rebels led by King Raff's son, Prince Sirk, and daughter, Princess Semage, all of whom dress as 6-foot-tall birds (although such creatures are not naturally found on Spengo). At first, the rebels don't trust Dick, but when Dick reveals that he shared a cell with Raff and that he is on their side, their attitude quickly changes, and Dick rises to the rank of war leader. Using what limited resources he can scrounge up, he devises a plan to sneak back into Spengo's palace and save Marge. In the meantime, General Afir, the only person among Spengo's forces resentful of his emperor's tyranny, believes that Dick and Marge are the key to ending Spengo's rule, so he switches the love serum meant for Marge with water and informs her of his intentions to recover Dick. However, Spengo overhears Afir's plan and has him placed in the barrel of the laser, to die when the weapon is fired at Earth.

While Spengo's wedding with Marge is prepared, a detachment of Spengo's soldiers go into the desert to finish the rebels, but find their camp deserted, and one by one they fall victim to a light grenade (which has "pick me up" engraved on it and disintegrates anyone who picks it up) left on Dick's pallet. Simultaneously, Dick and the rebels approach Spengo's fortress inside a large wooden bust of Spengo, which Spengo has brought into the chapel, and in the midst of the wedding ceremony the rebels emerge from the Trojan bust. As fighting rages in the castle, Spengo retreats to his lab with Marge and prepares to fire the Death Ray laser at Earth. Dick and Spengo clash with swords, but neither gains the upper hand. Marge manages to free herself and helps Dick throw Spengo into the sewers, where he is last seen being cornered by the Lub-Lubs. At the last second, Dick and Marge manage to shut down the Death Ray, saving Afir and the Earth.

With Spengo defeated, King Raff is reinstated as the rightful ruler, and he reverses the polarity on the Magnobeam to send Dick and Marge back to Earth. Upon arriving home, Dick and Marge proceed to show their son Alan, daughter Stephanie, and her boyfriend Carl slides (including an image of their space journey to Planet Spengo) from what they claim is "Santa Barbara". To end their anniversary, they share drinks on the roof, watching the stars.

== Cast ==
- Teri Garr as Marge Nelson
- Jeffrey Jones as Dick Nelson
- Jon Lovitz as Emperor Tod Spengo
- Thalmus Rasulala as General Afir
- Wallace Shawn as Sibor
- Eric Idle as King Raff
- Dwier Brown as Prince Sirk, the White Bird
- Kathy Ireland as Princess Semage
- Suzanne Ventulett as Stephanie Nelson
- Michael Stoyanov as Carl
- Danny Cooksey as Alan Nelson
- Tony Cox as Blaaatt
- Jeff Doucette as Captain Destroyer
- Jonathan Stark as Lieutenant Destroyer
- Brent Hinkley as Throne Room Destroyer
- Don and Dan Stanton as Twin Destroyers
- Laurie Main as Chorus Master

== Reception ==
The film received negative critical reviews and was a box office bomb. It opened in 904 theatres and grossed only $984,627 in its opening weekend. The following weekend it dropped nearly 70% and was withdrawn from distribution after a gross of $2 million.

Deseret News called the film a "spoof of science-fiction films that is more bizarre than funny" and said that the film had "been on and off the Warner Bros. release schedule so many times it's surprising this film wasn't released straight to video. It should have been." The Chicago Reader said that the film is "every bit as stupid as it sounds".

On Rotten Tomatoes, the film holds a rating of 12% from 25 reviews with the consensus: "There is no saving this off-putting family adventure from its mirthless script, although some inspired production design gives it some visual polish."
