= People Toys =

1974 American slasher film directed by Sean MacGregor

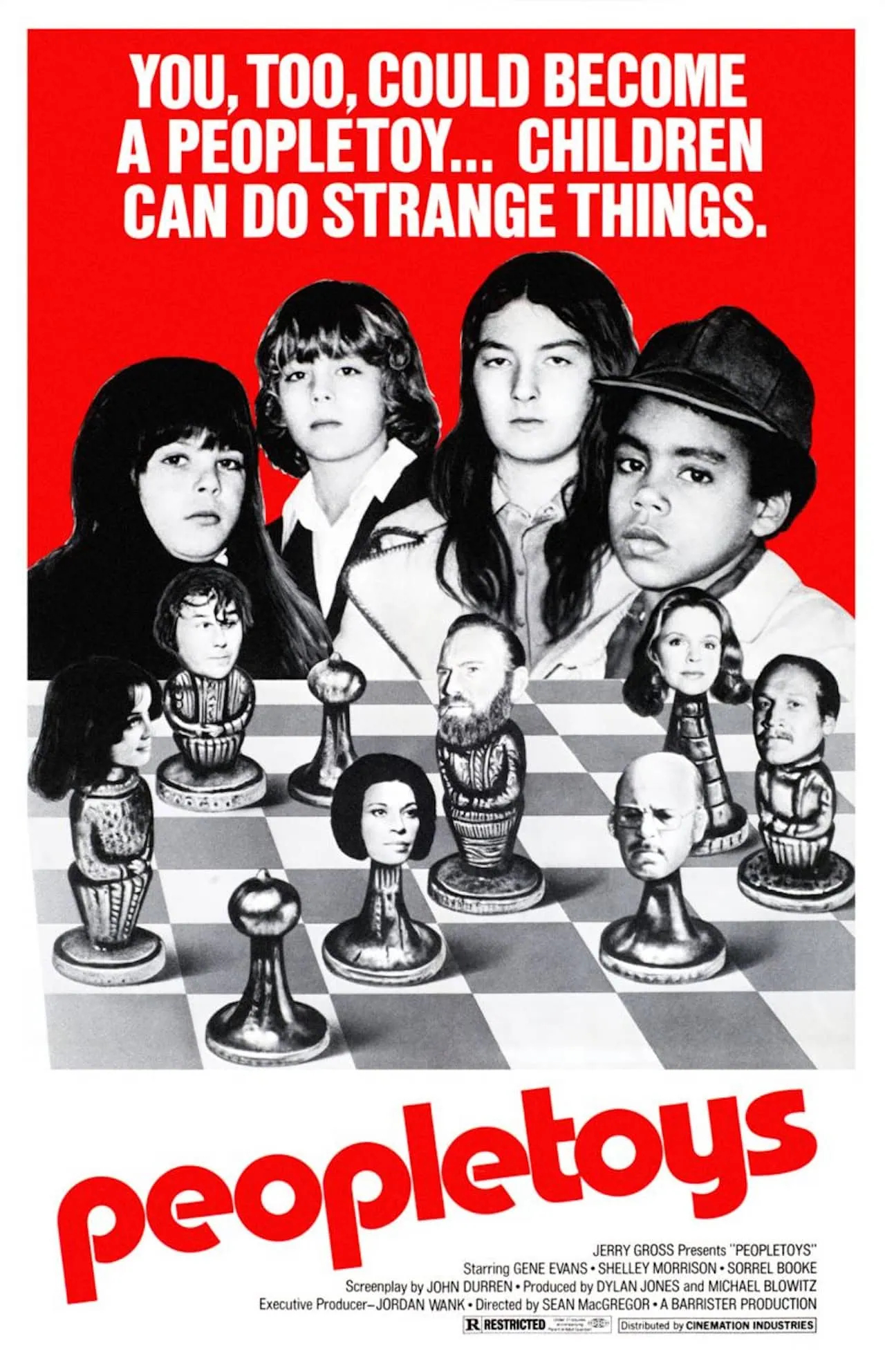
- Original theatrical release poster
- Directed by: Sean MacGregor (Note: David Sheldon served as an uncredited director project.)
- Written by: Dylan Jones
- Screenplay by: Sandra Lee Blowitz; John Durren
- Produced by: Michael Blowitz; Dylan Jones
- Starring: Sorrell Booke; Gene Evans; Shelley Morrison; Leif Garrett
- Cinematography: Paul Hipp; Michael Shea
- Edited by: Byron Brandt
- Music by: William Loose
- Distributed by: Cinemation Industries
- Release date: May 10, 1974
- Running time: 87 minutes
- Country: United States
- Language: English

People Toys is a 1974 American slasher film directed by Sean MacGregor and an uncredited David Sheldon and starring Sorrell Booke, Gene Evans, Shelley Morrison, and Leif Garrett, along with Garrett's real-life sister, Dawn Lyn and their mother, Carolyn Stellar. The film follows a group of four sociopathic, homicidal children who, accompanied by a mysterious nun, seek refuge with a number of snobbish vacationers at a lakeside chalet, only to systematically murder them one by one.

The film was re-released theatrically in 1976 under the alternate titles Devil Times Five and The Horrible House on the Hill in both the United States and the United Kingdom, as well as Tantrums in the United Kingdom on home video.

== Plot ==
On a snowy mountain pass in Lake Arrowhead, California, a van transporting children from a psychiatric hospital crashes, apparently killing most of its passengers, aside from a young nun, Sister Hannah, and four of the children: Susan, Moe, David, and Brian. The children and Sister Hannah travel on foot, seeking shelter. Meanwhile, in Los Angeles, Julie and her boyfriend Rick embark to Lake Arrowhead to visit her father, Papa Doc, a real estate tycoon, at his lakeside chalet.

Julie and Rick arrive at the chalet, along with Papa Doc's conniving business associate, Harvey Beckman and his wife, Ruth; Julie witnesses Papa Doc's new young wife, Lovely, attempting to seduce the mentally disabled house servant, Ralph, and sparks a fight. Meanwhile, the four children break into the wine cellar at Papa Doc's chalet. Back at the crashed van, the children's physician, Dr. Brown, regains consciousness and begins frantically searching for the children. He tracks them to the wine cellar, where the children murder him with Sister Hannah's assistance. They bury his corpse in the snow.

In the morning, the children surprise the residents of the chalet and Papa Doc agrees to let them stay for one night. In conversation, David tells Harvey that he and the others were on their way to make a film in Hollywood when their van crashed. After dinner that night, David and Brian sneak into Ralph's cabin and disengage the generator. When Ralph goes to inspect it, he is caught in a booby trap that strangles him to death.

The next day, Rick finds Ralph's corpse hanging from a noose in front of the generator. Papa Doc assumes Ralph committed suicide, but Rick suspects the children. He subsequently discovers that Papa Doc's car has been tampered with and that the guns and knives in the house have gone missing; he fears the children are out to do them harm. David, who is adorning himself in makeup and a dress, overhears Rick vocalizing his suspicions. Shortly after, David hacks Harvey to death with an ax while he chops wood outside.

Sister Hannah drowns Lovely in a bathtub, while Moe sets Papa Doc's pet piranhas loose in the bathwater to devour her. When Papa Doc witnesses the children dragging Lovely's body through the snow, he chases after them to Ralph's cabin, where he is killed with a knife in another rigged booby trap. Armed with the stolen guns, the children return to the chalet, first attacking Ruth, who begs Susan to let them go; the children douse Ruth in gasoline before Susan throws a lit match onto her, burning her alive. Rick and Julie flee, attempting to escape on a boat, but David forces them back to the chalet at gunpoint and the two barricade themselves in a second floor bedroom.

In the morning, David uses a ladder to reach the bedroom window and impales Julie through the neck with a pole that he forces through the glass, killing her. Rick, now alone and desperate, witnesses the children gleefully throwing snowballs at Papa Doc's corpse. This sparks rage in Rick and he decides to confront the children outside, only to be caught in an animal trap. Sister Hannah slashes Rick's throat with a knife, killing him. With all the adults dead, the children drag their corpses into Ralph's cabin and seat them around a table, playing with them as though they are dolls. After a brief time, Susan and Brian declare that it is time to move on. Moe expresses that she wants to continue playing, to which Sister Hannah responds that they will find new "toys" to play with.

The film ends with the words "The Beginning".

== Cast ==
- Sorrell Booke as Harvey Beckman
- Gene Evans as Papa Doc
- Taylor Lacher as Rick
- Joan McCall as Julie
- Shelley Morrison as Ruth
- Carolyn Stellar as Lovely
- John Durren as Ralph
- Leif Garrett as David
- Gail Smale as Sister Hannah
- Dawn Lyn as Moe
- Tierre Turner as Brian
- Tia Thompson as Susan
- Henry Beckman as Dr. Brown

== Production ==
People Toys was filmed in Lake Arrowhead and Big Bear Lake, California between February and April 1973. The production was notably tense between director Sean McGregor and producer Michael Blowitz, with Blowitz recalling that at one point, McGregor punched Blowitz in the face, to which Blowitz responded by throwing McGregor through a plate glass window.

Actor Tierre Turner recalled that, for himself and the other child actors, the shoot was "like a vacation...we were having a great time". One moment that stood out was in filming the piranha scene, when one of the fish turned out still to be alive and bit the adult actor on the leg.

== Release ==
The film was released theatrically in the United States by Cinemation Industries. According to the American Film Institute, no contemporary reviews confirm that the film was released under its original title, People Toys, though a 1974 edition of the film journal Screenworld reported the film to be due for a June 1974 release. However, contemporaneous newspaper showtime listings in the Austin American-Statesman indicate the film was released in Florida, Georgia, Texas, and Ohio under the title People Toys in May 1974.

In 1976, Seymour Borde & Associates purchased international distribution rights to the film, re-releasing it under the alternate title Devil Times Five. It was also released under another alternate title, The Horrible House on the Hill, for which an undated film poster was produced by Cinemation.

=== Home media ===
The film was released on VHS by Media Home Entertainment. It was later re-released by Video Treasures.

Code Red DVD released the film on DVD on November 21, 2006, and on Blu-ray in 2016. On February 9, 2021, Kino Lorber re-released the Blu-ray in conjunction with Code Red. In August 2024, Vinegar Syndrome released the film on 4K Ultra HD Blu-Ray with a new 4K restoration from the original camera negatives.

== Reception ==
=== Critical response ===
Cavett Binion of AllMovie described the film as "a seldom-seen but thoroughly satisfying horror sleeper with a sardonic sense of morality, taking great delight in knocking off [Gene] Evans' circle of decadent snobs in graphic and innovative ways."

== Sources ==
- Kord, T. S. (2016). Little Horrors: How Cinema's Evil Children Play on Our Guilt. Jefferson, North Carolina: McFarland. ISBN 978-1-476-62666-6.
- Landis, Bill; Clifford, Michelle (2002). Sleazoid Express: A Mind-Twisting Tour Through the Grindhouse Cinema of Times Square. New York City, New York: Fireside. ISBN 978-0-743-21583-1.
