= Dementia (1955 film) =

1955 film

- 2001 Kino Video DVD artwork
- Directed by: John Parker
- Written by: John Parker
- Produced by: John Parker; Ben Roseman; Bruno Ve Sota
- Starring: Adrienne Barrett; Bruno Ve Sota; Ben Roseman; Angelo Rossitto; Shelley Berman; Shorty Rogers
- Cinematography: William C. Thompson
- Edited by: Joseph Gluck
- Music by: George Antheil; Shorty Rogers
- Distributed by: Exploitation Pictures
- Release date: December 22, 1955
- Running time: 58 minutes (Note: The film is 5,212 feet (1,589 m) (55 minutes), according to the liner notes on the DVD release by Kino Video, 2000.)
- Country: United States
- Language: English

Dementia is a 1955 American black-and-white experimental horror film produced, written, and directed by John Parker, and starring Adrienne Barrett and Bruno Ve Sota. The film, which contains no dialogue, follows a young woman's nightmarish experiences during a single night in Los Angeles's skid row. Stylistically, it incorporates elements of horror, film noir, and expressionist film.

Dementia was conceived as a short film by writer-director Parker and was based on a dream relayed to him by his secretary, Barrett. He cast Barrett in the film, along with Ve Sota, and ultimately decided to expand it into a longer feature. The film received a troubled release, being banned in 1953 by the New York State Film Board before finally being released in December 1955. It was later acquired by Jack H. Harris, who edited it and incorporated voice over narration by radio personality Ed McMahon (later to be known for co-hosting The Tonight Show with Johnny Carson) before re-releasing it in 1957 under the alternate title Daughter of Horror.

== Plot ==
A young woman awakens from a nightmare in a run down hotel. She leaves the lodging and wanders into the night. She encounters a dwarf hawking newspapers with the bold headline "Mysterious stabbing". She smiles enigmatically and quickly walks on. In a dark alley, a wino approaches and grabs her. A policeman rescues her and beats up the drunk as she leaves. Along her way, a sharply dressed pimp with a pencil-thin mustache approaches her, buys a flower from a flower girl's basket, and cajoles her into escorting a porcine rich man in a chauffeured limousine. As they cruise through the night, she thinks back to her tragic youth and her abusive father. She had stabbed him to death with a switchblade after he shot and killed her unfaithful mother.

The rich man takes her to bars and nightclubs and finally to his elegant high-rise apartment. He first ignores her as he feasts on an extensive meal. She tempts him, and when he advances on her, she stabs him with her switchblade, pushing the dying man out of an upper story window. As he topples, he grabs the pendant around her neck, and it snaps off in his hand as he plummets. The crazed woman races out of the building onto the street and confronts the man's corpse. The dead man's hand still grasps her pendant in an iron grip, forcing her to saw it off with her knife. She flees while holding it, as she imagines faceless bystanders watching her impassively. Again, a patrol car appears. The same cop, with a strange frozen smile, tracks her with a spotlight as she runs; he appears to have her father's face. She ducks around a corner, hiding the severed hand in the flower girl's basket.

As she runs down an alley, the pimp suddenly grabs her from inside a doorway and drags her into a club; an enthusiastic audience watches a jazz band playing. The smiling policeman enters, as the corpse of the rich man lies at the window pointing to his murderer with his bloody stump. The crowd moves forward, encircling her, laughing maniacally. She passes out, reawakening alone in her dingy hotel room. She goes to the mirror on the dresser and searches for clues. In the top drawer, she discovers her broken pendant, clutched in the fingers of a severed hand closed over it.

== Cast ==
- Adrienne Barrett as the Gamin
- Bruno Ve Sota as Rich Man
- Ben Roseman as Law Enforcer / Father
- Richard Barron as Evil One
- Edward Hinkle as Butler
- Lucille Howland as Mother
- Jebbie Ve Sota as Flower Girl
- Faith Parker as Nightclub Dancer
- Gayne Sullivan as Wino
- Shorty Rogers as himself
- Angelo Rossitto as Newsboy
- Shelley Berman as Stoned Beatnik

== Analysis ==
Film scholar John Parris Springer suggests that Dementia, though exhibiting elements of a horror film, functions largely as a "psycho-social critique of the violence against women endemic to patriarchal society." Within the dark, urban milieu of the film, an obvious metaphor for the mind, resides an equally dark social fact: that the lives of women are often defined ('marked)' by abuse, objectification, sexual threat and violence". Springer also asserts that, because of the Gamin's willingness to strike back at her abusers with violence, the film had to be contextualized within the horror genre, as it was the only genre at the time which allowed for depictions of such transgressions.

Journalist Herman G. Weinberg wrote that the film's lead character suffers from an Electra complex, and is trapped in "a nightmare world in which all good has been routed leaving the girl enveloped in madness, like a protective cocoon." Additionally, Weinberg declared it the "first American Freudian film."

== Production ==
Writer-director John Parker (1925–1981) was an aspiring film producer from Portland, Oregon, where his family owned and operated the state's popular J. J. Parker movie theater chain. Parker conceived the idea for Dementia based on a nightmare his secretary, Adrienne Barrett, had relayed to him. Parker cast Barrett in the lead role of the Gamin, a young woman wandering through Los Angeles's skid row, in what was initially planned to be a short film. Parker cast Bruno Ve Sota as the wealthy man the Gamin encounters, and paid him $30 for fifteen hours of shooting. Pleased with the results, Parker decided to expand the short into a longer film.

Dementia was shot on Hollywood studio sets and on location in Venice, California. Production, including editing, ended in 1953. (Note: Quoted in the DVD liner notes by Kino Video.) Although Parker is solely credited as director, writer, and producer, Ve Sota claimed that he also contributed to the film significantly, serving as a co-writer and co-director, with many of the scenes having been improvised.

The original film had no dialogue, only music and some sound effects, like doors slamming, dubbed laughter, etc. The film's music score is by avant-garde composer George Antheil, vocalized by Marni Nixon. There are no lyrics as such. Jazz musician Shorty Rogers and his band, the Giants, can be seen and heard performing in the nightclub scene.

== Release ==
Dementia was briefly released in 1953 before it was banned by the New York State Film Board, who deemed it "inhuman, indecent, and the quintessence of gruesomeness". Two years later, it was re-released in New York City on December 22, 1955, with four edits demanded by the censors. It was paired as a double feature with another 50-minute film, Picasso. As a promotional stunt for the 1955 release, theater employees were required to submit medical examinations of patrons by "heart specialists" to assure that theatergoers would not be frightened to the point of harming their health.

This version was picked up by Jack H. Harris and re-released as Daughter of Horror in January 1957. Harris' version also has music without dialogue, but with added narration by actor Ed McMahon.

In May 1957 the British Board of Film Classification denied Dementia (in its alternate version Daughter of Horror) a release classification. Dementia was finally passed in 1970 without edits for United Kingdom theatrical release.

=== Home media ===
On October 17, 2000, Kino Video released Dementia on Region 1 DVD. The disc also includes the Jack H. Harris-released version of the film, Daughter of Horror. Under the title Dementia: Daughter of Horror the film was again released on DVD January 1, 2008. The British Film Institute issued a restored Blu-ray and DVD combination set in October 2020, featuring both the original and re-edited Daughter of Horror versions.

== Reception ==
=== Critical response ===
The New York Daily News criticized the film for suffering from a lack of coherence: "The presentation, designed as a shocker, is enough to drive anybody crazy with alternate sessions of tedium and bedlam". Variety wrote that it "May be the strangest film ever offered for theatrical release". A critic of The New York Times deemed it "A piece of film juvenilia… despite its good intentions… An understanding of Mr. Parker's desire to say something new cannot reconcile one to the lack of poetic sense, analytical skill and cinematic experience exhibited here".

Some critical publications were less critical, such as Cahiers du Cinéma, who noted: "To what degree this film is a work of art, we are not certain but, in any case, it is strong stuff". Time Out Film Guide noted: "The movie spends an hour exploring a lonely woman’s sexual paranoia through a torrent of expressionistic distortions which would look avant-garde if the vulgar Freudian ‘message’ weren’t so reminiscent of ’50s B features". Filmmaker Preston Sturges championed the film, writing "It stirred my blood, purged my libido. The circuit was completed. The work was a work of art".

On the review aggregator website Rotten Tomatoes, 75% of 8 critics' reviews are positive, with an average rating of 7.5/10.

== Legacy ==
Daughter of Horror is perhaps most famous for its appearance in The Blob (1958), where it is the film playing in the theater when the Blob strikes.

Dementia has also been identified as a feminist film critiquing the violent male-dominated society and subverting the dress code of noir.

In 2015 the rock band Faith No More used edited footage from Dementia to create a video for their song "Separation Anxiety".

== See also ==
- List of American films of 1955
- List of avant-garde films of the 1950s
- List of American independent films

== Sources ==
- Hogan, David J. (2013). Film Noir FAQ: All That's Left to Know About Hollywood's Golden Age of Dames, Detectives, and Danger. New York City, New York: Applause Books. ISBN 978-1-480-34305-4.
- Parla, Paul; Mitchell, Charles P. (December 1997). "The Ghouls Know: The Untold Story of Ed McMahon and Daughter of Horror". Scary Monsters Magazine. No. 25. pp. 121–122.
- Pym, John (1998). Time Out Film Guide (7th ed.). New York City, New York: Penguin. ISBN 978-0-140-27525-4.
- Schultz, Ian (2020). Dementia and the Art of Horror. Dementia (Blu-ray booklet notes). British Film Institute. pp. 1–7.
- Springer, John Parris (2003). "Daughter of Horror: Low-Budget Filmmaking, Generic Instability and Sexual Politics". In Rhodes, Gary Don (ed.). Horror at the Drive-in: Essays in Popular Americana. Jefferson, North Carolina: McFarland. ISBN 978-0-786-41342-3.
