= Ronald Fair =

American writer (1932–2018)

- Born: Ronald Lyman Fair; October 27, 1932; Chicago Illinois, U.S.
- Died: February 2018 (aged 85–86); Finland
- Occupations: Writer, sculptor
- Writing career
- Period: 1966–2000s

Ronald Lyman Fair (October 27, 1932 – February 2018) was an American writer and sculptor. He was known for his experimental and versatile literary forms, most prominently through the 1966 novel Hog Butcher, set in 1960s Chicago. This was the basis of the 1975 film Cornbread, Earl and Me, the cast of which included Rosalind Cash and Laurence Fishburne. Relocating to Finland, Fair began sculpting in 1977. In December 1980 he became "born again", thereafter becoming a "Christian writer" and founder of the International Orphans' Assistance Association.

== Biography ==
Ronald Fair was born in 1932 to Mississippi farmworkers Herbert and Beulah Hunt Fair in Chicago, Illinois, where he went to school. After serving three years in the US Navy, he attended the Stenotype School of Chicago, after which he found employment as a court reporter for 12 years. Having begun writing in his teens, he published various pieces in publications including the Chicago Defender, Ebony, Chat Noir, before the publication in 1965 of his first novel, Many Thousand Gone: An American Fable. His second novel, Hog Butcher, was filmed in 1975 as Cornbread, Earl and Me. In 1970, he published World of Nothing: Two Novellas, and 1972 the autobiographical novel We Can't Breathe.

In 1977, Fair moved to Finland, where he dedicated himself more to sculpture than writing. In Finland, he lived in Helsinki, Tampere and Kerimäki.

He died in Finland in February 2018, aged 85.

== Publications ==
- Many Thousand Gone: An American Fable (short novel), Harcourt, 1965.
- Hog Butcher (novel), Harcourt, 1966; republished as Cornbread, Earl and Me, Bantam, 1975.
- World of Nothing: Two Novellas, Harper, 1970.
- We Can't Breathe (novel), Harper, 1972.
- Excerpts (poetry), Paul Breman, 1975.
- Rufus (poetry), P. Schlack (Germany), 1977; 2nd edn Lotus Press, 1980

=== Norwegian ===
- 1987: Eva; Rex Forlag

=== Swedish ===
- 1978: "Gudskelov För snön" ("Thank God It Snowed"); 6/78 Bonniers Litterära Magasin (BLM), December 1978; Arg. 47 Nr 6.

=== Portuguese ===
- 2002: Correndo Para A Vida (1st printing), Brazil
- 2010: Correndo Para A Vida (2nd printing), Finland

=== Spanish ===
- 2010: Corriendo Hacia La Vida (1st printing) Finland

=== Lyrics for recordings ===
- 1980: "A New Kinda Day"; Frendz, Music, H. Silvenoinen; Lyrics, Ronald Fair
- 1980: "Final Awakening"; Frendz, Music, H. Silvenoinen; Lyrics, Ronald Fair
- 1980: "Dancing People"; Frendz, Music, H. Silvenoinen; Lyrics, Ronald Fair

== Movies ==
- 1968: An American Hero, film script for Dino De Laurentiis, Hollywood
- 1971: Hog Butcher, two drafts. Producer had two heart attacks and sold the rights to someone else
- 1975: Cornbread, Earl & Me, from Hog Butcher
- 1994: Kirje Suomesta, music video, directed by R. Ampuja
- 1995: Who Is Your Neighbour, Mumbai (Bombay), India; P. K. Rajhuns Director. Written and co-produced
- 2000: The Truth by P. K. Rajhuns; co-produced

== Play performances ==
- 1968: The Emperor's Parade, or, Our Boy Dick; A Political Satire (Chicago)
- 1968 & 1969: Sails and Sinkers; comedy (Chicago; Middletown, Conn Weslayan University)
- 1988: Animal Christmas, a musical (Helsinki)
- 2002: Animal Christmas, Jyväskylä, Finland
- 2003: Animal Christmas, Kankaanpää, Finland
- 2008: Animal Christmas; Hyderabad, India
- 2009: Animal Christmas; Hyderabad, India

== Sculpture ==
"Jesus Wept", wood, 24 cm

"Three Holes"; bronze, 30 cm; Museum Villa Urpo; Ylöjärvi, Finland

"Seven Praising Him"; painted wood, 70 X 100; private collection

"Praise Him With Stringed Instruments"; painted wood, 25 by 40 cm; private collection

"Mother & Child", wood, 90 X 40 cm; Museum Villa Urpo; Ylöjärvi, Finland

"Jesus & Two Criminals"; Bronze, 5 meters; Museum Villa Urpo; Ylöjärvi, Finland
