= The Savage Wild =

- Directed by: Gordon Eastman
- Written by: Gordon Eastman
- Produced by: Gordon Eastman
- Starring: Gordon Eastman
- Cinematography: Gordon Eastman; Wes Marks; Brad Eastman; Rod Eastman
- Distributed by: American International Pictures (US)
- Release date: January 1970
- Country: United States
- Language: English

The Savage Wild is a 1970 documentary film directed by, and starring, Gordon Eastman. It was one of a series of documentary films made by Eastman about life in the wild.

It was also known as Wild Arctic.

Eastman spent almost two years shooting the film in northern Canada.

== Cast ==
- Gordon Eastman as Gordon
- Carl Spore as Red
- Maria Eastman as Maria
- Arlo Curtis as Arlo
- Jim Thibaobeau as Jim
- Robert Wellington Kirk as Bob
- John Payne as John
- Charles Abou as Cha-Lay
- Alex Dennis as Cha-Lay's brother
- Charley Davis as Charley
- Wilber O'Brian as Helicopter pilot

== See also ==
- List of American films of 1970
