= The Monkey Hustle =

1976 film by Arthur Marks

- Original theatrical poster
- Directed by: Arthur Marks
- Written by: Odie Hawkins; Charles Eric Johnson
- Produced by: Arthur Marks; Robert E. Shultz
- Starring: Yaphet Kotto; Rudy Ray Moore; Rosalind Cash; Kirk Calloway
- Cinematography: Jack L. Richards
- Edited by: Art Seid
- Music by: Jack Conrad
- Distributed by: American International Pictures
- Release date: December 24, 1976
- Running time: 90 minutes
- Country: United States
- Language: English
- Budget: $300,000

The Monkey Hustle (also written as The Monkey Hu$tle) is a 1976 American blaxploitation film written by Odie Hawkins and Charles Eric Johnson. It stars Yaphet Kotto as Chicago con-man and "hustler" Daddy Foxx and Kirk Calloway as his teenage apprentice. Co-stars include Thomas Carter, Rudy Ray Moore, and Rosalind Cash.

The film taglines in advertising were: "Meet Daddy Fox, Baby D. and Goldie. They gonna do the Monkey Hustle!" "It ain't legal an it sure ain't safe...but it do seem worthwhile!"

== Plot summary ==
The film includes a loose plot centered on the ensemble cast of characters in which Foxx mentors "Baby D" (Calloway), "Player" (Carter), and "Tiny" (Harper) in the ways of small-time hustling. An example of a hustle is the boys apparently stealing some televisions from a truck for Foxx in sight of a local shop owner. The boys then steal the televisions from Foxx's truck and stash them in some trash. The shop owner offers the boys $55 for the televisions which they accept. However, when the shop owner returns with his dolly, he finds that the boys have run off with the cash as well as the televisions (which were actually empty boxes). The overarching plotline is to prevent the construction of an expressway through the neighborhood in which all the characters reside. Using facilities that are not adequately described in the film, Foxx and local numbers man "Glitterin' Goldie" (Moore) use potentially corrupt connections within the city government to prevent the construction.

== Cast ==
- Yaphet Kotto as "Daddy Foxx"
- Kirk Calloway as "Baby D"
- Thomas Carter as "Player"
- Donn Carl Harper as "Tiny"
- Lynn Caridine as Jan-Jan
- Patricia McCaskill as Shirl
- Lynn Harris as "Sweet Potatoe"
- Rudy Ray Moore as "Goldie"
- Rosalind Cash as Mama
- Randy Brooks as Win
- Debbi Morgan as Vi

== Reception and DVD ==
Roger Ebert, writing in the Chicago Sun-Times, gave the film one-and-half stars (out of four), calling it a "good-hearted muddle" but opining that "they must have left half the script back in Hollywood." Ebert did note with pleasure that the film's business justified opening the balcony at the now-demolished Roosevelt Theater, where he hadn't sat in four years. Edward Blank in the Pittsburgh Press viewed the film more harshly, saying it should have been rated "R" (instead of PG) for its "low moral tone" and that it was "disconcerting" to see Yaphet Kotto and Rosalind Cash "slumming." In 2009, Black Dynamite star and co-writer Michael Jai White cited The Monkey Hu$tle as a major influence, telling the Los Angeles Times, "It was just brash, unlike anything I'd ever seen... I remember these bigger-than-life characters, who reminded me of my uncles, and it was the first time I saw anything familiar in my life on the big screen." The Monkey Hustle was released to DVD by MGM on January 20, 2004, in a Region 1 "standard full screen" (1.33:1) aspect ratio DVD.
