= The Brain Eaters =

1958 film

- Theatrical release poster by Albert Kallis
- Directed by: Bruno VeSota
- Written by: Gordon Urquhart
- Based on: The Puppet Masters by Robert A. Heinlein (uncredited)
- Produced by: Ed Nelson
- Starring: Ed Nelson; Alan Jay Factor; Cornelius Keefe; Joanna Lee; Jody Fair; David Hughes; Leonard Nimoy
- Cinematography: Lawrence Raimond
- Edited by: Carlo Lodato
- Music by: Tom Jonson (consisting of large excerpts from symphonic works by Dmitri Kabalevsky, Sergei Prokofiev and Dmitri Shostakovich)
- Production company: Corinthian Productions
- Distributed by: American International Pictures
- Release date: October 1958
- Running time: 60 minutes
- Country: United States
- Language: English
- Budget: $26,000

The Brain Eaters is a 1958 independently made American black-and-white science fiction-horror film, produced by Ed Nelson (and Roger Corman, uncredited), and directed by Bruno VeSota. The film stars Nelson, Alan Jay Factor, and Joanna Lee, and includes a brief appearance by Leonard Nimoy (name misspelled in film credits as "Leonard Nemoy"). The Brain Eaters was distributed in October 1958 by American International Pictures on a double feature in some areas with Earth vs. the Spider (1958), and in others with Terror from the Year 5000 (1958).

== Plot ==
In Riverdale, Illinois, a man carrying a lighted glass container bumps into a pedestrian. The container is broken, and a fight ensues.

On their way home, Glenn Cameron and his fiancée, Elaine, are distracted by a light. They stop to investigate in nearby woods and find dead animals before coming upon a metal structure resembling a rocket's nose cone.

Two days later, in Washington, D.C., a committee reviews classified army footage of the object. Also noted are several murders in the nearby town. Sen. Walter K. Powers and his assistant Dan Walker fly to Riverdale to investigate and are met by Glenn Cameron, whose father, the mayor, is missing. The three drive to the object's location. Alice Summers, the mayor's secretary, assists Dr. Paul Kettering, the committee's chief investigator, by recording test results. The senator approaches the cone to question Kettering and his assistant, Dr. Wyler. The cone appears to be indestructible, and its interior is a maze of tunnels.

Meanwhile, Mayor Cameron returns to his office, acting as if possessed. He takes a pistol from his desk and struggles to point it at his head. Kettering, the senator, Alice and Glenn arrive. Kettering notices a mound near the mayor's neck and asks him about it. The mayor strikes Glenn while attempting to flee. The mayor starts shooting and is eventually killed in the hallway by a deputy.

During the autopsy, the doctor and Kettering find a dead creature attached to the mayor's neck; it injected a toxin into his nervous system. Even without being shot, he would have died within 24–48 hours.

While driving toward the cone, the sheriff sees a man lying on the road. The sheriff tries to help the man, who attacks him. Another man, holding a glass container, watches the fight. The sheriff is knocked out, and the two men remove something from the container. The sheriff revives, and the three drive off in his car.

Aided by Alice, Kettering experiments with a piece of the creature that infected the mayor. Like a parasite, it attaches itself to Kettering, who frees himself by burning it. Wyler calls Kettering, and they drive to the cone. En route, they discover an abandoned electric company utility truck. Sen. Powers calls the sheriff, who does not answer, struggling with being possessed. Three groups are organized to search for other metal objects. Kettering and Alice find the body of the truck's driver with two puncture wounds on the neck. While searching, Glenn and Elaine are locked inside a cabin. Someone tries to set the cabin on fire, but Glenn shoots at him and escapes with Elaine. The three groups reassemble at the mayor's office and discover two glowing containers holding more parasites. The senator calls the telegraph office to send a warning to the governor. The telegrapher takes down the message but, being possessed, does not send it.

Three men drive to Alice's apartment and plant a parasite in her room. She is taken over and joins the men. Realizing she is missing, Paul and Glenn drive back to the cone and see Prof. Helsingman, a dying man who vanished five years earlier along with a scientific expedition. Discovering marks on his neck, they take him to the hospital. Kettering questions the professor, who only utters the word "Carboniferous", referring to a geologic time period millions of years ago. Sen. Powers tries to make some phone calls, but is told that all the lines are busy. Glenn and Paul go to the telegraph office to find out if the warning was sent to the governor. They are attacked but manage to subdue their assailants and flee.

Kettering climbs the cone to check on his equipment. He realizes the two deputies on guard are now possessed, and both are shot and killed. Kettering and Glenn crawl inside the cone and discover a room behind a sliding wall. They are greeted by another member of the missing expedition, an old man who says he was once Prof. Cole but now holds "a position of a much higher order." Apparently, the parasites' invasion is coming from inside the Earth. They want to force a life free from strife and turmoil upon mankind, creating a utopia. After the possessed Cole disappears, Kettering shoots and kills the lurking sheriff. Parasites then chase Kettering and Glenn outside.

Kettering formulates a plan using the abandoned truck. Using a harpoon gun, he connects an electrical wire from one end of the ravine to the other. He prepares to shoot a connecting wire from the cone to a high-voltage transmission line, completing a circuit. Before Kettering can finish, Alice exits the cone. Kettering tries to rescue her. Being possessed, she refuses to move and mortally shoots him with a gun. With his dying breath, he tells Glenn to fire the gun. Glenn fires the harpoon gun, making the connection to the transmission line, which engulfs the cone in electricity. Alice collapses as the parasites inside the object are electrocuted. Walking away from the site, Glenn and Elaine later embrace.

== Cast ==
- Ed Nelson as Dr. Paul Kettering (credited as Edwin Nelson)
- Alan Jay Factor as Glenn Cameron (credited as Alan Frost)
- Cornelius Keefe as Sen. Walter K. Powers (credited as Jack Hill)
- Joanna Lee as Alice Summers
- Jody Fair as Elaine Cameron
- David Hughes as Dr. Wyler
- Robert Ball as Dan Walker
- Phil Posner as the Sheriff (credited as Greigh Phillips)
- Orville Sherman as Mayor Cameron
- Leonard Nimoy (credited as Leonard Nemoy) as Professor Cole
- Doug Banks as Doctor
- Henry Randolph as Telegrapher
- Saul Bronson as Professor Helsingman
- Hampton Fancher as Zombie (uncredited)

== Production ==
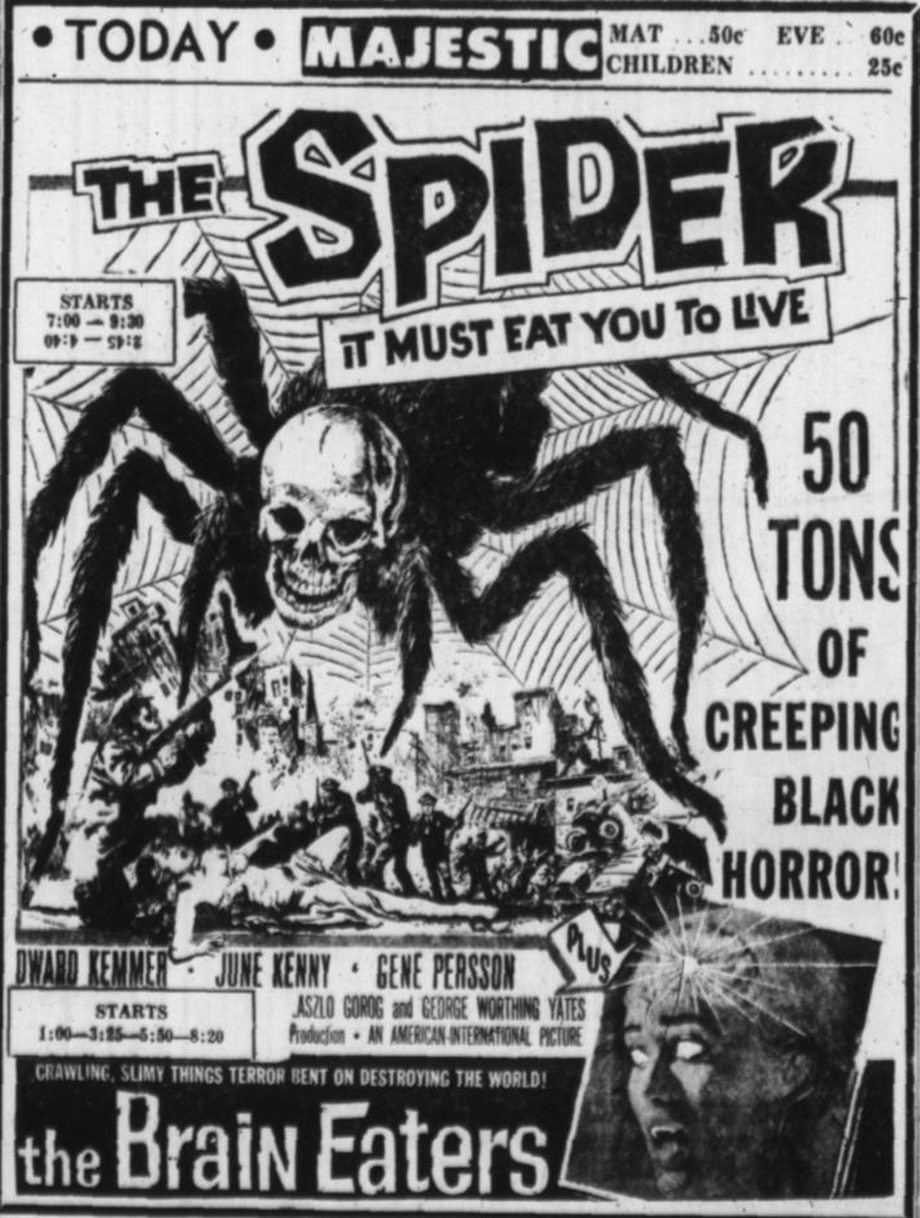
Advertisement from October 31, 1958 for The Brain Eaters and co-feature, Earth vs. the Spider

The Brain Eaters was known during production as, variously, The Keepers, The Keepers of the Earth, Attack of the Blood Leeches, and Battle of the Brain Eaters.

Bruno VeSota (who had directed Female Jungle for the predecessor to AIP in 1955) wanted to direct a film, so he approached Corman with the script. Corman helped him raise the modest financing needed, as well as arranging distribution through AIP. The film was shot over six days on a budget of $26,000.

After its release, science fiction author Robert A. Heinlein sued for plagiarism, asking for damages of $150,000, claiming that The Brain Eaters was based on his 1951 novel The Puppet Masters. Corman insisted that he was unfamiliar with Heinlein's work, both while reading the script and during the film's production. He did, however, see the obvious comparisons once he'd read the novel, so Corman settled out of court for $5,000 and acceded to Heinlein's demand that he receive no screen credit, as the author found the film "wanting". The lawsuit that resulted halted actor John Payne's intention of producing a film based on Heinlein's novel.

== Legacy ==
In 1997, Brad O. Nelson developed the Brain Eaters Font Company, a division of Font Diner named after the film that specializes in novelty and niche typography heavily inspired by vintage pop culture, B-movies, horror, and science fiction. Many of its known worthy fonts included Musicals, Action Is, and Psychatronic.

== See also ==
- List of American films of 1958

== Bibliography ==
- Warren, Bill. Keep Watching the Skies: American Science Fiction Films of the Fifties, 21st Century Edition. Jefferson, North Carolina: McFarland & Company, 2009 (First Edition 1982). ISBN 0899500323.
