= Bucktown (film) =

1975 film

- Theatrical Release Poster
- Directed by: Arthur Marks
- Written by: Bob Ellison
- Produced by: Bernard Schwartz
- Starring: Fred Williamson; Pam Grier; Thalmus Rasulala; Tony King
- Cinematography: Robert Birchall
- Edited by: George Folsey Jr.
- Music by: Johnny Pate
- Distributed by: American International Pictures
- Release date: July 2, 1975
- Running time: 94 minutes
- Country: United States
- Language: English
- Budget: $600,000

Bucktown is a 1975 American crime action blaxploitation film released by American International Pictures directed by Arthur Marks and starring Fred Williamson, Pam Grier, Thalmus Rasulala, and Tony King. Carl Weathers, who plays Hambone, also appeared in his first credited film role.

== Plot ==
Duke Johnson, a former black activist, arrives in Bucktown to bury his brother Ben, a bar owner who was killed for refusing to pay crooked white cops for protection. Ben’s widow, Aretha is hostile towards him as he never contacted Ben while he was still alive even though her friend, Harley tries to calm them down. Duke tries to settle Ben’s estate, but is disgruntled when he learns he has to wait 60 days for everything to be settled. Duke then opens up Club Alabam, the club that Ben owned. Racist cops try to harass him, but Duke and Harley kick them out. Aretha then goes to Duke’s house to apologize, but after he complains that she never told him how Ben died, the two get into an argument until Duke kisses her and they have sex.

After the cops shoot at Duke’s house, he realizes he needs help. So he calls his old friend Roy, who arrives in town with his own army the next day and, with their help, Duke systematically kill the cops and hold police chief Patterson in custody. The mayor then decides to give the group money and appoint them as the new police force. Duke declines the money, but Roy says he’ll give it to him in case he changes his mind.

However, two of Roy’s men, T.J and Hambone become disgruntled that Duke is getting paid without doing anything and decide to drive a wedge between Duke and Roy by attacking Harley at Club Alabam, leaving him hospitalized. Duke confronts Roy, who claims Harley instigated the fight. Their relationship further sours when T.J breaks into Duke’s house and tries to rape Aretha, but Duke beats him up and kicks him out. He then breaks into Roy’s apartment and claims that he sent T.J to rape Aretha, and the two men violently yell each other to leave town. Harley is released from hospice, but when trying to start another fight with T.J, is arrested. Harley’s son, Steve recommends to Duke that he goes to an armory across the river, where they steal a tank and drive back to town.

Aretha, meanwhile, goes to the police station to seduce T.J into letting Harley go, but instead holds Harley at gunpoint, kills Patterson, and makes Aretha beg for her life. Duke smashes the tank into the police station, kills T.J and Hambone, and confronts Roy. Not wanting to kill him, Duke proposes a fist fight for control of town, which Roy accepts. The two fight violently fight across the building before they tumble outside. Eventually, Roy is mortally wounded, and dies while Duke reunites with Aretha, and they, Harley, and Steve leave the scene.

== Cast ==
- Fred Williamson as Duke Johnson
- Pam Grier as Aretha
- Thalmus Rasulala as Roy Williams
- Tony King as T.J.
- Bernie Hamilton as Harley
- Art Lund as Chief Brian Patterson
- Tierre Turner as Steve
- Carl Weathers as Hambone
- Morgan Upton as Sam
- Jim Bohan as Clete

== Music ==
The film's score was written by Johnny Pate, and its main theme sung by Luther Rabb. The soundtrack was released by American International Records.

== Production ==
Filming began on September 30, 1974 in Kansas City on 12th Street, 9th St, and Locust St, with further shooting at a Railroad Depot in Leavenworth and a cemetery and the Platte County Courthouse in Platte City. According to Marks, he got inspiration to make Bucktown after reading an article about a bartender in Brooklyn, Illinois who fought back against a corrupt system, eventually leading to a shootout.

The Platte County Courthouse was unhappy that the movie was filmed at the location without permission, and requested copies of the script to decide if further filming was permitted. Eventually, permission was granted, and a breakaway wall was installed for the scene where Duke crashes a tank into the building.

== Reception ==
The New York Times reviewer Vincent Canby gave the film a negative review, calling it "really bad" and "both silly and vicious," though he praised the performances of Williamson and Grier, saying the two "display enough of their own private wit to save the movie from seeming to be quite the mess it is."

In a 2012 interview, director Arthur Marks described the film as "a big success," noting that Samuel Arkoff's American International Pictures saw the film and wanted to distribute it (Marks had previously distributed through his own General Film Corporation). He claimed, "it made back its initial cost very quickly, and played every inner-city in the North. It was making --playing the State Lake Theater in Chicago-- at [sic] $60,000 and 70,000 a week." Mark's work with AIP on the film led to their distributing his subsequent films.

== Release ==
Bucktown was released in July 1975 to mixed reviews but a successful box office run. The film has since been released on DVD by MGM in 2001, on Blu-ray by Scorpion Releasing in 2019, and in 4K Blu-ray by Shout! Studios in 2025 as part of the Blaxploitation Classics Vol. 2.

== Remake ==
Bucktown was loosely remade as the film Full Clip (2004). Williamson also borrowed heavily from the film's plot for his 1996 film Original Gangstas, which also co-starred Grier.

== See also ==
- List of American films of 1975
