= J. D.'s Revenge =

1976 film by Arthur Marks

- Theatrical release poster
- Directed by: Arthur Marks
- Written by: Jaison Starkes
- Produced by: Arthur Marks
- Starring: Glynn Turman; Louis Gossett Jr.; Joan Pringle
- Cinematography: Harry J. May
- Edited by: George Folsey Jr.
- Music by: Robert Prince
- Distributed by: American International Pictures
- Release date: June 30, 1976 (Los Angeles)
- Running time: 96 minutes
- Country: United States
- Language: English
- Box office: $2.4 million

J. D.'s Revenge is a horror film released in 1976. It starred Glynn Turman and Lou Gossett. The main character, Isaac Hendrix, becomes an unwilling host for the restless spirit of J.D. Walker, a hustler killed 30 years earlier when he was wrongfully accused of killing his sister.

== Plot ==
Isaac "Ike" Hendrix is a young law student who lives with his girlfriend, Christella and works as a taxi-cab driver in New Orleans. While out on a night of fun with Christella and their best friends, Tony and Phyllis, he participates in a hypnosis act and becomes an unwilling host for the restless spirit of J.D. Walker - a hustler and pimp from the 1940s who ran numbers during World War II and managed a black-market meat plant.

One day in 1942, at the meat plant, J.D. witnessed the murder of his sister, Betty Jo, at the hands of rival numbers runner, Theotis Bliss. J.D. stumbles upon his sister's body and is accused by her husband and Theotis' brother, Elija, of the murder and is then shot dead.

Ike finds himself gradually being taken over by the vengeance seeking J.D., having memories of J.D.'s life and death, even eventually going so far as to adopt his hair and fashion style, gangster mannerisms, and psychotic tendencies, often hurting Christella in the process.

Once taking full control of Ike's body, J.D. commits havoc all over town before making his way to the church where Elija, former boxer & gangster, is now working as a preacher. At the church, he also sees Theotis accompany his brother, as well as Roberta, the daughter of Elija and Betty Jo and J.D.'s niece who is the splitting image of her mother.

Theotis, who doesn't believe in his brother's sermons, later reveals that he & Elija use the church as a cover for their criminal organization even though Elija is in full pursuit of faith.

J.D. poses as Ike to befriend the Bliss family to be close to them, even seducing Roberta and having sex with his own niece through Ike's body. Theotis, who is skeptical of 'Ike's' behavior, sends goons to threaten and assault him.

Meanwhile, Christella's parents have gone to her ex-husband, Carl, a cop who is out for Ike's blood, believing him to simply be a psycho hiding behind a false persona—until he mentions to his captain, Turner, that Ike claimed his name was J.D. Walker, a man who Turner explains is not only real, but also had died over 30 years ago.

After attacking Christella again, J.D. goes home with a woman named Sheryl he met at a club & assaults her husband with a straight razor after he accosts J.D. for sleeping with his wife.

J.D. eventually reveals his true identity to Elija and tells him to have Theotis to meet him at the meat plant where he and Betty Jo were killed. Having left the gangster life behind to pursue faith full time, Elija relays this to Theotis and says that this is God's way of justice; he decides to hopefully free Ike from J.D.'s possession with Theotis tagging along.

As J.D. makes his way through the meat plant, he finally remembers the events that led up to his death through a flashback. Betty Jo had an affair with Theotis, who is the biological father of Roberta, but she was constantly dismissive of him. Theotis was enraged by Betty Jo's derisive chiding of him and her threats to expose Roberta's true paternity to Elija, so he impulsively slashed her throat before hiding. J.D. made his way to cradle his sister's body, but Elija stumbled upon them moments after and mistook J.D. as his wife's killer and Theotis killed him to cover up his crime.

Elija and Theotis arrive at the meat plant, where J.D. is waiting & Roberta appears after secretly tagging along. J.D. reveals the truth, and Theotis confesses it, admitting he was envious of Elija, stunning his brother and daughter. Theotis attempts to gun down J.D. again, but Elija and Roberta struggle with him to stop, with J.D. laughing maniacally at the irony of the struggle. Elija accidentally discharges the weapon and kills Theotis, prompting him to run away as Roberta mourns over his body and the police arrive. With his vengeance achieved, J.D. appears to leave Ike's body.

As Ike and Roberta are brought in by the police, Elija has a breakdown in his church over killing his brother. He decides to go to the precinct and lies to captain Turner that Theotis accidentally shot himself, while defending Ike's actions as an act of possession by J.D., who is gone. Roberta reconciles with Elija and continues to acknowledge him as her father. Turner decides to let Ike go free, although Ike is nervous that J.D. could return in the future. Ike rejoins Christella and their friends waiting for him outside.

== Cast ==
- Glynn Turman as Isaac "Ike" Hendrix
- Louis Gossett Jr. as Reverend Elija Bliss
- Joan Pringle as Christella Morgan
- Carl W. Crudup as Tony
- James Watkins as Carl
- Fred Pinkard as Theotis Bliss
- Jo Anne Meredith as Sara Divine
- Alice Jubert as Roberta Bliss / Betty Jo Walker
- David McKnight as J.D. Walker
- Stephanie Faulkner as Phyllis
- Fuddle Bagley as Enoch Land
- Earl Billings as Captain Turner
- Paul Galloway as Garage Man

== Production ==
Filming for J.D.'s Revenge began on January 5, 1976, in New Orleans, Louisiana, and concluded on February 6, with post-production commencing on March 1. It premiered in Los Angeles on June 30, 1976.

The film was also released under the alternate title The Reincarnation of J.D. Walker.

== Reception ==
Film critic Roger Ebert gave the film two stars, pointing out that it was a "movie of possession where things have to pause while the spirit has things explained to it", and that it "takes longer than usual for the possessed man's friends to figure out something is not quite right with him". He added that "what makes the movie work, to the degree that it does, are the performances by Turman, Lou Gossett and Joan Pringle. Turman, in particular, has fun transforming himself from the mild-mannered law student to the zoot-suited 1940s two-bit gangster".

== Home video ==
J.D.'s Revenge was released on DVD by MGM Home Video on April 1, 2003, as a Region 1 widescreen DVD. On November 14, 2017, Arrow Video released the film on Blu-ray, featuring a 2K restoration of the movie from the original 35 mm interpositive and several special features.
