= Cornbread, Earl and Me =

1975 film

- Theatrical release poster
- Directed by: Joseph Manduke
- Written by: Ronald Fair; Leonard Lamensdorf
- Based on: Hog Butcher by Ronald Fair
- Produced by: Joseph Manduke; Leonard Lamensdorf
- Starring: Moses Gunn; Rosalind Cash; Bernie Casey; Keith Wilkes; Madge Sinclair; Laurence Fishburne
- Edited by: Aaron Stell
- Music by: Donald Byrd
- Production company: American International
- Distributed by: American International Pictures
- Release date: May 20, 1975 (New York)
- Running time: 95 minutes
- Country: United States
- Language: English
- Budget: $800,000
- Box office: $2,020,000

Cornbread, Earl and Me is a 1975 American coming-of-age drama film that stars Tierre Turner, Laurence Fishburne (in his film debut), and NBA player Jamaal Wilkes. It was directed and co-produced by Joseph Manduke. The film is loosely based on the 1966 Ronald Fair novel Hog Butcher.

== Plot ==
The film focuses on three African-American youths living in an urban neighborhood. Nathaniel Hamilton is a star basketball player from the neighborhood, nicknamed "Cornbread." In the film, he epitomizes the dream of the neighborhood to be successful, as he is about to become the first from his district to enter college on an athletic scholarship.

He is also a local hero to the much younger friends Earl Carter and Wilford Robinson. The plot thickens after a pick-up basketball game ends because of a heavy rain, and all the kids run to the local store and hang out, waiting for the rain to end. All the kids leave, except for Cornbread, Earl and Wilford. Earl and Wilford get into a playful argument about how fast Cornbread can run home. It is decided that Cornbread should make it home in 25 seconds, so he runs off, after buying another soda for himself.

Unknown to all of them, an assault suspect in the neighborhood is dressed like Cornbread. The two police officers are hot on the suspect's trail, but lose him in the rain. As the police officers are coming out of an alleyway, they see Cornbread running and mistake him for the suspect they are seeking. Later the two officers fatally shoot Cornbread in the back.

Wilford screams hysterically, ensuing a riot. The coroner's inquest is hampered by severe police intimidation, and no one knows anything about the shooting, except for Wilford, who appears on the witness stand in court by telling exactly what he saw (in graphic detail).

== Cast ==
- Moses Gunn as Benjamin Blackwell, Lawyer
- Rosalind Cash as Sarah Robinson, mother of Wilford
- Bernie Casey as Officer Larry Atkins
- Madge Sinclair as Leona Hamilton, mother of Cornbread
- Laurence Fishburne as Wilford Robinson
- Thalmus Rasulala as Charlie, Boyfriend of Sarah
- Antonio Fargas as "One Eye"
- Logan Ramsey as Deputy Coroner
- Vince Martorano as Officer John Golich
- Charles Lampkin as Fred Jenkins, Store Owner
- Stefan Gierasch as Sergeant Danaher
- Stack Pierce as Sam Hamilton, father of Cornbread
- Tierre Turner as Earl Carter, Wilford's Friend
- Jamaal Wilkes (credited as Keith Wilkes) as Nathaniel "Cornbread" Hamilton
- Hal Baylor as Mr. Wilson
- Beverly Hope Atkinson as Edna
- William Upton as "Stud"
- Erik Kilpatrick as "Ace"

== Release ==
The film had its premiere on May 20, 1975 at New York City's Penthouse Theatre for the benefit of the United Negro College Fund. It opened to the public the next day at the theatre and grossed $83,512 in its first week of release. In its third week of release the film made $228,000 from 12 cities. In 1977, the Los Angeles Times stated that it was ultimately a box-office success.

In 2001, the film was released on DVD. In 2010, it was digitized in High Definition (1080i) and broadcast on MGM HD.

== See also ==
- List of American films of 1975
- List of basketball films
- List of hood films
