= Bruno VeSota =

American actor (1922–1976)

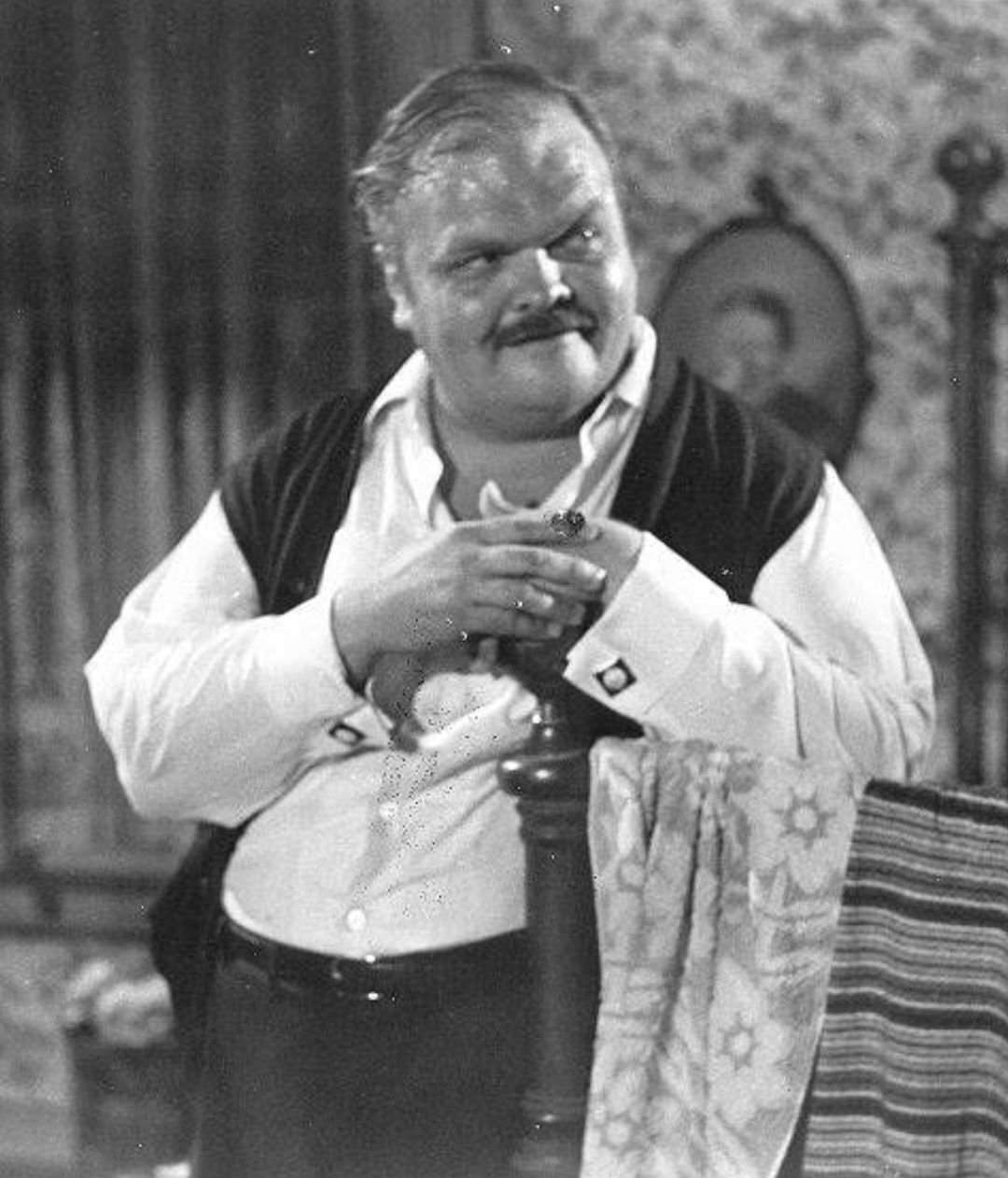
- VeSota in Attack of the Giant Leeches (1959)
- Born: Bruno William VeSota; March 25, 1922; Chicago, Illinois, U.S.
- Died: September 24, 1976 (aged 54); Culver City, California, U.S.
- Occupations: Actor; director; producer
- Years active: 1947–1974

Bruno William VeSota (March 25, 1922 – September 24, 1976) was an American character actor, director and producer who, between 1945 and 1974, appeared in hundreds of television episodes and over 50 feature films. He is remembered for prominent supporting roles in 15 Roger Corman films as well as for having directed three low-budget features: Female Jungle (1956), The Brain Eaters (Corman as uncredited executive producer, 1958) and Invasion of the Star Creatures (1962).

== Chicago television ==
A native of Chicago, VeSota entered Chicago television in 1945 writing many teleplays for WBKB-TV such as an adaptation of Edgar Allan Poe's "The Tell-Tale Heart". In 1948, he moved to WGN-TV as a producer, director and writer.

VeSota was one of the directors of They Stand Accused, "television's first live dramatic courtroom series", which ran on WGN-TV before it expanded to national distribution first on CBS and later on DuMont. He also directed Chicagoland Mystery Players on WGN-TV before it went on Dumont.

== Film work ==
He made his big-screen debut in 1953 with appearances in The System and The Wild One.

He is remembered for appearances in science fiction films in the 1950s and early 1960s, such as Dementia (1955), Attack of the Giant Leeches (1959), The Wasp Woman (1959) and The Wild World of Batwoman (1966).

He directed a few movies, such as Female Jungle (1955), The Brain Eaters (1958) and Invasion of the Star Creatures (1962).

In the 1960s, he played the barman in a number of episodes of Bonanza, including S8 E1 (1967) "Something Hurt, Something Wild".

== Death ==
VeSota died in Culver City in 1976 following a heart attack at the age of 54.
