= Jimmy Joy =

American jazz musician (1902–1962)

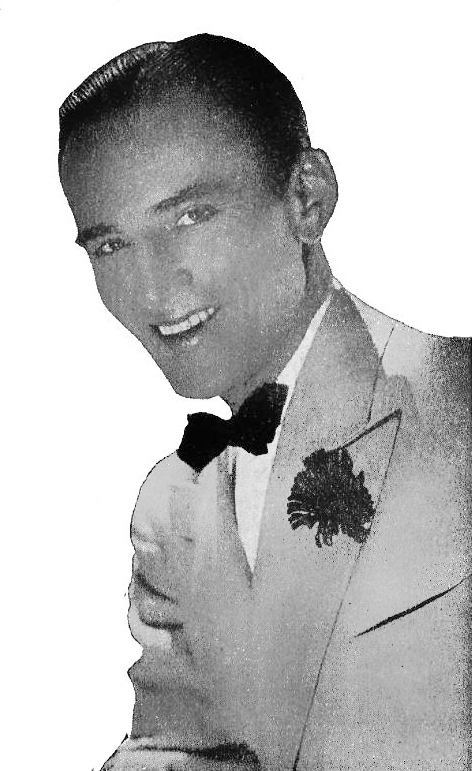
Jimmy Joy in 1944 advertisement

James Monte Maloney (April 20, 1902 – March 7, 1962), known professionally as Jimmy Joy, was an American saxophonist, clarinetist, singer, and big band leader. His claim to fame was his ability to play two clarinets at the same time.

== Recordings ==
His recordings with his orchestra included "The Yale Blues", the Bing Crosby composition "From Monday On", "I Got Worry", "Today is Today", "Can't You Understand", "Harmonica Harry", "If It Wasn't For the Moon", "Chilly Pom-Pom Pee", "Apple Blossoms and Chapel Bells", and "You're the First Thing I think of in the Morning". He recorded for Brunswick Records and Varsity Records.
