= Arthur Marks =

American film director (1927–2019)

- Born: August 2, 1927; Los Angeles, California, U.S.
- Died: November 13, 2019 (aged 92); Los Angeles, California, U.S.
- Occupations: Film director; writer; producer; distributor
- Spouse: Phyllis Marie Lehman

Arthur Ronald Marks (August 2, 1927 – November 13, 2019) was an American film and television director, writer, producer and distributor best known for his work in the blaxploitation genre, directing films such as Detroit 9000, Friday Foster, Bucktown, The Monkey Hu$tle and J. D.'s Revenge. He also directed and produced numerous episodes of the American legal drama Perry Mason, as well as episodes of Starsky & Hutch, Mannix, I Spy, My Friend Tony, The Dukes of Hazzard, Steve Canyon, and Young Daniel Boone.

== Early life and career ==
Arthur Marks was born in Los Angeles, California, in 1927 to parents who had moved to Hollywood to find work in the film industry. His father, David Marks, worked a series of film jobs, from sound man to assistant director, on films like Hell's Angels and The Wizard of Oz, spending the last 30 years of his career at MGM. As a child, Marks frequently appeared as an unbilled extra in films such as Boy's Town and The Good Earth and the Andy Hardy series. After serving in the Merchant Marines during World War II and briefly attending USC as a journalism major, Marks dropped out of college and took a job with the MGM production department. He did production work on 75 MGM films over the next three years, eventually working as an assistant director at Columbia Studios and doing uncredited reshoots in post-production for The Lady from Shanghai and The Caine Mutiny, as well as numerous other films, Westerns and serials, and numerous feature films before beginning his own career as a director. During the early 1950s, he briefly left Hollywood to serve in the United States Navy during the Korean War.

== Directorial career ==
Marks worked as an assistant director on television shows The Man Behind the Badge, Treasury Men in Action, Casablanca, Broken Arrow and The 20th Century Fox Hour, before becoming involved with the pilot episode of the legal drama Perry Mason. He worked as an assistant director on 15 episodes of Perry Mason, and, starting in the middle of the first season, began working as a director. He would go on to direct 76 episodes of the series, and eventually worked as the producer as well.

Following the conclusion of Perry Mason, Marks began to move into feature films, beginning with 1970's independently distributed Togetherness starring George Hamilton and Peter Lawford. Following that film, he directed Bonnie's Kids, building on his previous model of independent distribution to turn the film into a lucrative drive-in success. Successful serial-killer films The Centerfold Girls (which he produced but did not direct) and The Roommates followed, as Marks began exploiting a lack of studio pictures and a strong market for more exploitation films in the drive-in circuit. In the 2010 documentary short, Arthur's Kids, Marks explains that major Hollywood Studios tended to dismiss the drive-in circuit and refused to allow their films to be shown there, creating an opportunity for smaller independent distributors to build a business model based on supplying the drive-ins with cheaply produced, titillating fare. To capitalize on this market, Marks formed GFC (General Film Corporation), an independent distributor through which he produced and distributed his own early films as well as other cult fare (including Guerdon Trueblood's The Candy Snatchers, among others).

His positive experience working with actor Alex Rocco on Bonnie's Kids led Marks to cast Rocco in Detroit 9000, a gritty crime story which also featured Hari Rhodes and Scatman Crothers. The film was written by Academy Award Nominee Orville H. Hampton (who had worked with Marks previously on episodes of Perry Mason) and shot in Detroit, featuring numerous local personalities and landmarks. It was a financial success upon its release in 1973, but remained little-remembered until director Quentin Tarantino championed it decades later, re-releasing it theatrically through his short-lived Rolling Thunder Pictures in 1998, and on video in 1999. Tarantino also incorporated a line of dialogue from the film into the soundtrack for his own Jackie Brown.

Along with his theatrical output in 1973, Marks also made a return to television, directing two episodes of The New Perry Mason, a revival of the character Marks had begun his directorial career working with (now played by Monte Markham instead of Raymond Burr). The series was short-lived, ending mid-season after only 15 episodes.

Marks's next film, 1975's Bucktown, starring Fred Williamson and Pam Grier, found considerable financial success and established Marks as a director in the Blaxploitation genre. It attracted the attention of James Nicholson and Samuel Arkoff's American International Pictures, which distributed the picture and subsequently distributed most of Marks' later films.

Following the success of Bucktown, Marks acquired the rights to the comic strip Friday Foster, adapting it into a 1975 film starring Pam Grier. The script, co-written with Hampton, adds themes of black political unity into a more traditional mystery structure. He then moved on to the blaxploitation/horror film J.D.'s Revenge and the ensemble comedy The Monkey Hu$tle (which starred Yaphet Kotto and featured Rudy Ray Moore), both in 1976.

Following his work in film, Marks moved back to television, directing numerous episodes of Mannix, Starsky & Hutch, The Dukes of Hazzard and I Spy, as well as working to develop several new TV series with CBS, none of which never came to fruition. Marks also was called upon to "Doctor" a number of feature films that needed a reshoot, or a rewrite or a professional approach. He died at his home in Woodland Hills, Los Angeles on November 13, 2019.

== Legacy ==
Quentin Tarantino's 1998 re-release of Detroit 9000 garnered positive reviews. The New York Times critic Lawrence Van Gelder claimed "In general release, Detroit 9000 illustrates the wisdom of the adage "better late than never," and praised the film's complex racial politics, while the A.V. Club's Nathan Rabin opined that, while the film was flawed, it was also an "interesting, thoroughly watchable film, and considering its genre and origins, that's something of an achievement."

Marks's work in Blaxploitation has led several scholars of the genre to examine his films at length, including Mikel J. Koven in his 2010 book Blaxploitation Films and Yvonne D. Sims in her 2006 book Women of Blaxploitation: How the Black Action Film Heroine Changed American Popular Culture. Critic David W. Steece Jr. has noted that Marks's films are distinct from other Blaxploitation fare due to their unusual focus on character and frequent ensemble structure which seems to regard an entire community as the focus of the film, rather than a single main character. He points out that, a "lack of agency characterizes most of Marks’s leads. The people with the most screen time in his films are always at the whim of off-screen forces that are typically the real heart of the story."

Black Dynamite star and co-writer Michael Jai White has cited Marks's 1976 The Monkey Hu$tle as a major influence, telling the Los Angeles Times, "It was just brash, unlike anything I'd ever seen... I remember these bigger-than-life characters, who reminded me of my uncles, and it was the first time I saw anything familiar in my life on the big screen."

== Filmography ==
As director

- 1970: Togetherness
- 1972: Class of '74
- 1973: Bonnie's Kids
- 1973: The Roommates
- 1973: Detroit 9000
- 1975: Bucktown
- 1975: A Woman for All Men
- 1975: Friday Foster
- 1976: J. D.'s Revenge
- 1976: The Monkey Hu$tle

Others

- 1974: The Centerfold Girls (story)
- 1975: Linda Lovelace for President (executive producer)
