= Pacific Vibrations =

- Directed by: John Severson
- Written by: John Severson
- Starring: Jock Sutherland
- Distributed by: American International Pictures (US)
- Release date: 1970
- Running time: 92 mins
- Country: United States
- Language: English

Pacific Vibrations is a 1970 surfing documentary.

== See also ==
- List of American films of 1970
