= Female Jungle =

1955 film by Bruno VeSota

- Theatrical release poster by Albert Kallis
- Directed by: Bruno VeSota
- Screenplay by: Burt Kaiser; Bruno VeSota
- Story by: Burt Kaiser
- Produced by: Burt Kaiser
- Starring: Lawrence Tierney; Kathleen Crowley; John Carradine; Jayne Mansfield; Burt Kaiser
- Cinematography: Elwood Bredell
- Edited by: Carl Pingitore
- Music by: Nicholas Carras
- Production company: Bert Kaiser Productions
- Distributed by: American Releasing Corporation (ARC)
- Release date: January 1955 (United States)
- Running time: 73 minutes
- Language: English
- Budget: $49,000

Female Jungle is a 1955 black-and-white film noir directed by Bruno VeSota and starring Kathleen Crowley, Lawrence Tierney, John Carradine and Jayne Mansfield. The production was Mansfield's first film, as well as the only American International Pictures entry into film noir.

== Plot ==
A cop (Tierney) is suspected of killing a gorgeous film star. Since he was extremely drunk at the time, even he suspects that he did it.

The investigation leads him to Candy (Mansfield), an artist's mistress, as well as to a slimy Laura-type gossip columnist (John Carradine) who spent time with the woman that night and becomes the main suspect. But he also becomes a red herring when a third man is finally found to be the real killer.

== Cast ==
- John Carradine as Claude Almstead
- Lawrence Tierney as Det. Sgt. Jack Stevens
- Jayne Mansfield as Candy Price
- Kathleen Crowley as Peggy Voe
- Davis Roberts as George
- Burt Kaiser as Alex Voe
- Bruno VeSota as Frank
- Eve Brent (billed as Jean Lewis) as Monica Madison

== Production ==
Producer Burt Kaiser and director Bruno VeSota (directing his first film), both have roles in the film. In 1954, Kaiser unsuccessfully tried to sell the distribution rights to Paramount Pictures and Allied Artists before it was picked up by American Releasing Corporation (ARC), which later became American International Pictures.

It is rumored that Mansfield was paid $150 for her role in the film.

The movie was shot in six days. Kathleen Crowley was the lead; one day with half the film to finish she turned up to filming three hours late claiming she had been raped. The script was rewritten to build up the role played by Jayne Mansfield and additional scenes were shot involving a double for Crowley.

== Release ==
The movie was shown as a double feature with Roger Corman's The Oklahoma Woman in 1956 to ride on Mansfield's popularity which had risen dramatically due to her 20th Century Fox films released at the time.

=== Critical response ===
In Death on the Cheap, Arthur Lyons writes that the film, although "shoddily written, produced and directed", is significant for several reasons, including "It was American International's only foray into film noir ... The film also marked a return to the screen of noir icon Lawrence Tierney, whose off-screen bar brawls and numerous arrests during the 1940s had made him persona non grata in Hollywood."

Film critic Dennis Schwartz, gave the film a mixed review and discussed the film's problems. He wrote, "A muddled but diverting B film noir melodrama from cheapie American International Pictures. Future sex queen Jayne Mansfield, known as the blonde bombshell, made her acting debut, costarring as a nymphomaniac. Its attempts to be hard-boiled fall apart when it becomes apparent that writer Burt Kaiser couldn't get a handle on the plot line, and instead lets the narrative get mired in too much silliness. It also suffers from a weak directing effort by Bruno Ve Sota and cheesy production values."

== See also ==
- List of American films of 1955
