= List of American films of 1975 =

This is a list of American films released in 1975.

== Box office ==
The highest-grossing American films released in 1975, by domestic box office gross revenue as estimated by The Numbers, are as follows:

Highest-grossing films of 1975
Rank	Title	Distributor	Domestic gross
1	Jaws	Universal	$272,965,550
2	One Flew Over the Cuckoo's Nest	United Artists	$108,981,275
3	Shampoo	Columbia	$49,407,734
4	Dog Day Afternoon	Warner Bros.	$46,665,856
5	The Return of the Pink Panther	United Artists	$41,833,347
6	Three Days of the Condor	Paramount	$41,509,797
7	The Rocky Horror Picture Show	20th Century Fox	$40,420,000
8	Funny Lady	Columbia	$40,055,897
9	The Other Side of the Mountain	Universal	$34,673,100
10	Tommy	Columbia	$34,251,525

== January–March ==
Opening		Title	Production company	Cast and crew	Ref.
J A N U A R Y	1	Teenage Seductress	Vineager Syndrome	Chris Warfield (director/screenplay); George Buck Flower, John F. Goff (screenplay); Sondra Currie, Chris Warfield, Elizabeth Saxon, John Trujillo, Sonny Cooper, Gwen Van Dam, Michelle D'Agostin, Claudia Smillie	
J A N U A R Y	6	Slade in Flame	Goodtimes Enterprises	Richard Loncraine (director); Andrew Birkin, Dave Humphries (screenplay); Noddy Holder, Dave Hill, Don Powell, Jim Lea, Tom Conti, Alan Lake, Johnny Shannon, Kenneth Colley, Anthony Allen, Sara Clee	
J A N U A R Y	9	The Buffalo Creek Flood: An Act of Man	Appalshop	Mimi Pickering (director)	
J A N U A R Y	27	Galileo	American Film Theatre	Joseph Losey (director/screenplay); Barbara Bray (screenplay); Topol, Georgia Brown, Edward Fox, John Gielgud, Margaret Leighton, Tom Conti, Patrick Magee, John McEnery, Michael Lonsdale, Clive Revill, Job Stewart	
J A N U A R Y	29	Mr. Ricco	United Artists / Cinema International Corporation	Paul Bogart (director); Robert Hoban, Ed Harvey (screenplay); Dean Martin, Eugene Roche, Thalmus Rasulala, Denise Nicholas, Cindy Williams, Geraldine Brooks, Philip Michael Thomas, George Tyne	
J A N U A R Y	31	And Then There Were None	Variety Distribution / Corona Filmproduktion / Talía Films / COMECI	Peter Collinson (director); Harry Alan Towers (screenplay); Oliver Reed, Elke Sommer, Richard Attenborough, Stéphane Audran, Herbert Lom, Gert Fröbe, Maria Rohm, Adolfo Celi, Alberto de Mendoza, Charles Aznavour, Orson Welles, Naser Malek Motiei	
F E B R U A R Y	2	Rafferty and the Gold Dust Twins	Warner Bros.	Dick Richards (director); John Kaye (screenplay); Alan Arkin, Sally Kellerman, Mackenzie Phillips, Alex Rocco, Charles Martin Smith, Harry Dean Stanton, John McLiam, Richard Hale, Louis Prima, Lauren Stocks, Earl W. Smith	
F E B R U A R Y	5	Report to the Commissioner	United Artists / Frankovich Productions	Milton Katselas (director); Abby Mann, Ernest Tidyman (screenplay); Michael Moriarty, Yaphet Kotto, Susan Blakely, Héctor Elizondo, Tony King, Michael McGuire, Edward Grover, Dana Elcar, Bob Balaban, William Devane, Stephen Elliott, Richard Gere, Vic Tayback, Albert Seedman, Mark Margolis, Noelle North	
F E B R U A R Y	6	The Strongest Man in the World	Walt Disney Productions / Buena Vista Distribution	Vincent McEveety (director); Joseph L. McEveety, Herman Groves (screenplay); Kurt Russell, Joe Flynn, Eve Arden, Cesar Romero, Phil Silvers, Dick Van Patten, Harold Gould, Michael McGreevey, Richard Bakalyan, William Schallert, Benson Fong, James Gregory, Paul Linke, John Debney	
F E B R U A R Y	11	Shampoo	Columbia Pictures / Rubeeker Films	Hal Ashby (director); Robert Towne, Warren Beatty (screenplay); Warren Beatty, Julie Christie, Goldie Hawn, Lee Grant, Jack Warden, Tony Bill, Jay Robinson, George Furth, Susanna Moore, Carrie Fisher, Luana Anders, Mike Olton, Kathleen Miller, Brad Dexter, William Castle, Howard Hesseman, Michelle Phillips, Susan Blakely, Cynthia Wood, Randy Scheer, Richard E. Kalk	
F E B R U A R Y	12	The Stepford Wives	Columbia Pictures / Palomar Pictures	Bryan Forbes (director); William Goldman (screenplay); Katharine Ross, Paula Prentiss, Peter Masterson, Nanette Newman, Tina Louise, Patrick O'Neal, William Prince, Carole Mallory, Judith Baldwin, George Coe, Franklin Cover, Robert Fields, Michael Higgins, Josef Sommer, Remak Ramsay, Mary Stuart Masterson, Tom Spratley, Carol Rossen, Toni Reid, Barbara Rucker, Ronny Sullivan	
F E B R U A R Y	24	Jacques Brel Is Alive and Well and Living in Paris	American Film Theatre	Denis Héroux (director); Eric Blau (screenplay); Mort Shuman, Elly Stone, Jacques Brel, Joe Masiell, Annick Berger, Moni Yakim, Bernard Lafontaine, France Lombard, Sophie Héroux, Nico Sirakos, Jean Schianno, René Quivrin, Paule Tanneur, Martial	
F E B R U A R Y	24	Mahler	Goodtimes Enterprises	Ken Russell (director/screenplay); Robert Powell, Georgina Hale, Lee Montague, Miriam Karlin, Rosalie Crutchley, Richard Morant, Angela Down, Ronald Pickup, Peter Eyre, Dana Gillespie, George Coulouris, David Collings, Arnold Yarrow, Elaine Delmar, Benny Lee, Andrew Faulds, Kenneth Colley, Oliver Reed, Antonia Ellis, David Trevena, Otto Diamant, Michael Southgate, Sarah McClellan, Claire McClellan, Gary Rich	
F E B R U A R Y	26	Boss Nigger	Dimension Pictures	Jack Arnold (director); Fred Williamson (screenplay); Fred Williamson, D'Urville Martin, R. G. Armstrong, William Smith	
M A R C H	1	At Long Last Love	20th Century Fox	Peter Bogdanovich (director/screenplay); Burt Reynolds, Cybill Shepherd, Madeline Kahn, Duilio Del Prete, Eileen Brennan, John Hillerman, Mildred Natwick, Quinn Redeker, J. Edward McKinley, John Stephenson, William Paterson, Lester Dorr, Liam Dunn, M. Emmet Walsh, Burton Gilliam, Ned Wertimer, Arthur Peterson, Roger Price, Morgan Farley, Gene LeBell, Artie Butler, Basil Hoffman, Jeffrey Byron, Christa Lang, Tucker Smith	
M A R C H	12	Funny Lady	Columbia Pictures / Rastar	Herbert Ross (director); Jay Presson Allen, Arnold Schulman (screenplay); Barbra Streisand, James Caan, Roddy McDowall, Ben Vereen, Carole Wells, Omar Sharif, Larry Gates, Royce Wallace, Lilyan Chauvin, Joshua Shelley, Cliff Norton, Corey Fischer, Garrett Lewis, Ken Sansom, Colleen Camp, Alana Stewart, Gary Menteer, Dick Winslow, Jack Angel, Eugene Troobnick, Heidi O'Rourke, Samantha C. Kirkeby, Matt Emery, Jackie Stoloff	
M A R C H	13	The Great Waldo Pepper	Universal Pictures	George Roy Hill (director/screenplay); William Goldman (screenplay); Robert Redford, Bo Svenson, Susan Sarandon, Margot Kidder, Bo Brundin, Geoffrey Lewis, Edward Herrmann, Philip Bruns, Roderick Cook, Scott Newman, John Reilly, Kelly Jean Peters, James S. Appleby, Patrick W. Henderson, James N. Harrell, Elma Aicklen, Deborah Knapp, John A. Zee, Jack Manning, Joe Billings, Robert W. Winn, Lawrence P. Casey, Greg Martin, Frank Price	
M A R C H	14	The Prisoner of Second Avenue	Warner Bros.	Melvin Frank (director); Neil Simon (screenplay); Jack Lemmon, Anne Bancroft, Gene Saks, Elizabeth Wilson, Florence Stanley, Maxine Stuart, Ed Peck, Ivor Francis, Stack Pierce, Patricia Marshall, Ketty Lester, M. Emmet Walsh, Sylvester Stallone, F. Murray Abraham, Lonnie Burr, Gary Owens, John Ritter, Joe Turkel, Gene Blakely, Dee Carroll, James McCallion, Alan DeWitt, Cosmo Sardo, Norman Stevans	
M A R C H	14	Rancho Deluxe	United Artists / Elliott Kastner Productions	Frank Perry (director); Thomas McGuane (screenplay); Jeff Bridges, Sam Waterston, Elizabeth Ashley, Clifton James, Harry Dean Stanton, Slim Pickens, Charlene Dallas, Richard Bright, Patti D'Arbanville, Joe Spinell, Doria Cook-Nelson, Jimmy Buffett, Sandy Kenyon, Thomas McGuane, Warren Oates, John Quade, Maggie Wellman, Bert Conway, Jim Melin, Dwight Riley, Tim Schaeffer	
M A R C H	17	In Celebration	American Film Theatre	Lindsay Anderson (director); David Storey (screenplay); Alan Bates, Bill Owen, Brian Cox, James Bolam, Constance Chapman, Gabrielle Daye	
M A R C H	19	The Yakuza	Warner Bros.	Sydney Pollack (director); Paul Schrader, Robert Towne (screenplay); Robert Mitchum, Ken Takakura, Brian Keith, Herb Edelman, Richard Jordan, Keiko Kishi, Eiji Okada, James Shigeta, Kyosuke Machida, Christina Kokubo, Eiji Go, William Ross, Lee Chirillo, M. Hisaka, Akiyama, Harada	
M A R C H	21	Escape to Witch Mountain	Walt Disney Productions / Buena Vista Distribution	John Hough (director); Robert Malcolm Young (screenplay); Eddie Albert, Ray Milland, Donald Pleasence, Kim Richards, Ike Eisenmann, Walt Barnes, Reta Shaw, Denver Pyle, Alfred Ryder, Lawrence Montaigne, Terry Wilson, George Chandler, Dermott Downs, Don Brodie, Paul Sorensen, Harry Holcombe, Sam Edwards, Dan Seymour, Eugene Daniels, Shepherd Sanders, Kyle Richards	
M A R C H	24	Rosebud	United Artists	Otto Preminger (director); Erik Lee Preminger (screenplay); Peter O'Toole, Richard Attenborough, Cliff Gorman, Claude Dauphin, John V. Lindsay, Peter Lawford, Raf Vallone, Adrienne Corri, Isabelle Huppert, Brigitte Ariel, Lalla Ward, Kim Cattrall, Debra Berger, Mark Burns, Amidou, Klaus Löwitsch, Yosef Shiloach, Françoise Brion, Maria Machado, Serge Marquand, Jean Martin	
M A R C H	26	Brannigan	United Artists	Douglas Hickox (director); Christopher Trumbo, Michael Butler, William P. McGivern, William W. Norton (screenplay); John Wayne, Richard Attenborough, Judy Geeson, Mel Ferrer, John Vernon, Ralph Meeker, Daniel Pilon, Lesley-Anne Down, Barry Dennen, John Stride, James Booth, Arthur Batanides, Pauline Delaney, Del Henney, Brian Glover, Don Henderson, Tony Robinson, Anthony Booth	
M A R C H	26	Brother, Can You Spare a Dime?	Visual Programme Systems Ltd. / Dimension Pictures	Philippe Mora (director/screenplay); The Andrews Sisters, Fred Astaire, Warner Baxter, Jack Benny, Busby Berkeley, Willie Best, Humphrey Bogart, George Burns, James Cagney, Cab Calloway, Eddie Cantor, Hobart Cavanaugh, George Chandler	
M A R C H	26	The Manchu Eagle Murder Caper Mystery	United Artists / Strathmore Productions	Dean Hargrove (director/screenplay); Gabriel Dell (screenplay); Gabriel Dell, Huntz Hall, Jackie Coogan, Joyce Van Patten, Barbara Harris, Will Geer, Anjanette Comer, Vincent Gardenia, Sorrell Booke, Dick Gautier, Nita Talbot, Nicholas Colasanto, Howard Storm	
M A R C H	26	Sheba, Baby	American International Pictures	William Girdler (director/screenplay); David Sheldon (screenplay); Pam Grier, Austin Stoker, D'Urville Martin, Rudy Challenger, Dick Merrifield	

== April–June ==
Opening		Title	Production company	Cast and crew	Ref.
A P R I L	2	Smoke in the Wind	Frontier Productions	Joseph Kane (director); Eric Allen (screenplay); John Ashley, John Russell, Myron Healey, Walter Brennan, Henry Kingi, Dan White, Billy Hughes Jr., Bill Coontz, Susan Huston, Linda Weld, Adair Jameson, Lorna, Jack Horton, Bill McKenzie	
A P R I L	2	Supervixens	RM Films International	Russ Meyer (director/screenplay); Shari Eubank, Charles Napier, Uschi Digard, Henry Rowland, Christy Hartburg, Colleen Brennan, John LaZar, Stuart Lancaster, Deborah McGuire, Haji, Charles Pitts, Glenn Dixon, Big Jack Provan, Garth Pillsbury, Ron Sheridan	
A P R I L	6	Capone	20th Century Fox / Santa Fe Productions	Steve Carver (director); Howard Browne (screenplay); Ben Gazzara, Harry Guardino, Susan Blakely, John Cassavetes, Sylvester Stallone, Frank Campanella, John Orchard, Carmen Argenziano, George Chandler, John Davis Chandler, Royal Dano, Peter Maloney, Dick Miller, Robert Phillips, Martin Kove, Mario Gallo, Tony Giorgio, Johnny Martino, Tina Scala	
A P R I L	9	The Passenger	United Artists	Michelangelo Antonioni (director/screenplay); Mark Peploe, Peter Wollen (screenplay); Jack Nicholson, Maria Schneider, Steven Berkoff, Ian Hendry, Jenny Runacre, José María Caffarel, Ángel del Pozo, Ambroise Bia, Charles Mulvehill, James Campbell, Manfred Spies, Jean-Baptiste Tiemele	
A P R I L	21	The Maids	American Film Theatre	Christopher Miles (director/screenplay); Robert Enders (screenplay); Glenda Jackson, Susannah York, Vivien Merchant, Mark Burns	
A P R I L	23	Aloha, Bobby and Rose	Columbia Pictures / Cine Artists International	Floyd Mutrux (director/screenplay); Paul Le Mat, Dianne Hull, Tim McIntire, Leigh French, Martine Bartlett, Noble Willingham, Robert Carradine, Mario Gallo, Edward James Olmos, Cliff Emmich, Erick Hines, Tony Gardenas, Tip Fredell, William Dooley, David Bond, Dorothy Love	
A P R I L	23	Fore Play	Troma Entertainment	John G. Avildsen, Bruce Malmuth, Robert McCarty, Ralph Rosenblum (directors); Bruce Jay Friedman, Dan Greenburg, David Odell, Jack Richardson (screenplay); Zero Mostel, Estelle Parsons, Pat Paulsen, Jerry Orbach, George S. Irving, Carmen Álvarez, Irwin Corey, Thayer David, Paul Dooley, Laurie Heineman, Louisa Moritz, Shelley Plimpton, Fred Baur, Andrew Duncan, Deborah Loomis, George King, Tom McDermott	
A P R I L	23	Dolemite	Dimension Pictures	D'Urville Martin (director); Jerry Jones (screenplay); Rudy Ray Moore, D'Urville Martin, Lady Reed, West Gale, John Kerry, Jerry Jones, Vainus Rackstraw	
A P R I L	27	Death Race 2000	New World Pictures	Paul Bartel (director); Robert Thom, Charles B. Griffith (screenplay); Sylvester Stallone, David Carradine, Simone Griffeth, Louisa Moritz, Don Steele, Mary Woronov, Roberta Collins, Martin Kove, Joyce Jameson, Paul Laurence, Harriet Medin, Bill Morey, Fred Grandy, John Landis, Carle Bensen, Sandy McCallum, Vince Trankina, William Shephard, Leslie McRay, Wendy Bartel, Jack Favorite, Sandy Ignon, Darla McDonell, Roger Rook	
A P R I L	28				
A P R I L	28	Monty Python and the Holy Grail	EMI Films / Python (Monty) Pictures / Michael White Productions / National Film Trustee Company	Terry Gilliam, Terry Jones (directors/screenplay); Graham Chapman, John Cleese, Eric Idle, Michael Palin (screenplay); Graham Chapman, John Cleese, Terry Gilliam, Eric Idle, Terry Jones, Michael Palin, Connie Booth	
M A Y	1	Switchblade Sisters	Centaur Releasing	Jack Hill (director); F.X. Maier (screenplay); Robbie Lee, Joanne Nail, Monica Gayle, Asher Brauner, Chase Newhart, Marlene Clark, Kitty Bruce, Janice Karman, Don Stark, Kate Murtagh	
M A Y	4	Seven Beauties	Medusa Distribuzione	Lina Wertmüller (director/screenplay); Giancarlo Giannini, Fernando Rey, Shirley Stoler, Elena Fiore, Roberto Herlitzka, Lucio Amelio, Piero Di Iorio, Enzo Vitale, Ermelinda De Felice, Bianca D'Origlia, Francesca Marciano, Mario Conti	
M A Y	7	The Day of the Locust	Paramount Pictures / Long Road Productions	John Schlesinger (director); Waldo Salt (screenplay); Donald Sutherland, Karen Black, William Atherton, Burgess Meredith, Richard Dysart, John Hillerman, Geraldine Page, Bo Hopkins, Pepe Serna, Lelia Goldoni, Billy Barty, Jackie Earle Haley, Gloria LeRoy, Jane Hoffman, Norman Leavitt, Madge Kennedy, Natalie Schafer, Gloria Stroock, Nita Talbot, Paul Stewart, William Castle, Paul Jabara	
M A Y	7	The Specialist	Crown International Pictures / Renaissance Productions	Howard Avedis (director/screenplay); Ralph B. Potts, Marlene Schmidt (screenplay); Adam West, John Anderson, Ahna Capri, Harvey Jason, Alvy Moore, Marlene Schmidt, Howard Avedis, Robert Shayne, Christiane Schmidtmer, Charles Knapp, Chuck Boyd	
M A Y	8	The Happy Hooker	Cannon Films	Nicholas Sgarro (director); William Richert (screenplay); Lynn Redgrave, Jean-Pierre Aumont, Tom Poston, Lovelady Powell, Nicholas Pryor, Elizabeth Wilson, Conrad Janis, Richard Lynch, Vincent Schiavelli, Anita Morris	
M A Y	9	The Wild Party	American International Pictures	James Ivory (director); Walter Marks (screenplay); James Coco, Raquel Welch, Perry King, Royal Dano, Tiffany Bolling, David Dukes, Mews Small, Paul Barresi, Annette Ferra	
M A Y	12	End of the Game	20th Century Fox / Constantin Film / MFG-Film / T.R.A.C.	Maximilian Schell (director/screenplay); Roberto de Leonardis (screenplay); Jon Voight, Jacqueline Bisset, Martin Ritt, Robert Shaw, Helmut Qualtinger, Gabriele Ferzetti, Rita Calderoni, Norbert Schiller, Lil Dagover, Friedrich Dürrenmatt, Donald Sutherland	
M A Y	14	Moonrunners	United Artists	Gy Waldron (director/screenplay); James Mitchum, Kiel Martin, Arthur Hunnicutt, Joan Blackman, Waylon Jennings, Spanky McFarlane, Joey Giardello, Happy Humphrey, Ben Jones, Chris Forbes, George Ellis, Pete Munro, Bill Gribble, Bruce Atkins	
M A Y	16	Sheila Levine Is Dead and Living in New York	Paramount Pictures	Sidney J. Furie (director); Kenny Solms (screenplay); Jeannie Berlin, Roy Scheider, Sid Melton, Rebecca Dianna Smith, Janet Brandt, Charles Woolf, Leda Rogers, Jack Bernardi	
M A Y	17				
M A Y	17	The Man in the Glass Booth	American Film Theatre	Arthur Hiller (director); Edward Anhalt, Robert Shaw (screenplay); Maximilian Schell, Lois Nettleton, Lawrence Pressman, Luther Adler, Lloyd Bochner, Robert H. Harris, Henry Booth, Norbert Schiller, Berry Kroeger, Leonardo Cimino, Connie Sawyer	
M A Y	17	Tale of The Man of Honor			
M A Y	20	The Fortune	Columbia Pictures	Mike Nichols (director); Adrien Joyce (screenplay); Warren Beatty, Jack Nicholson, Stockard Channing, Florence Stanley, Richard B. Shull, Tom Newman, John Fiedler, Scatman Crothers, Kathryn Grody, Ian Wolfe, Dub Taylor, Catlin Adams, Christopher Guest, Harry Dean Stanton	
M A Y	21	Cornbread, Earl and Me	American International Pictures	Joseph Manduke (director); Ronald Fair, Leonard Lamensdorf (screenplay); Moses Gunn, Rosalind Cash, Bernie Casey, Keith Wilkes, Madge Sinclair, Larry Fishburne, Thalmus Rasulala, Antonio Fargas, Logan Ramsey, Vince Martorano, Charles Lampkin, Stefan Gierasch, Stack Pierce, Tierre Turner, Hal Baylor, Beverly Hope Atkinson	
M A Y	21	The Eiger Sanction	Universal Pictures / The Malpaso Company	Clint Eastwood (director); Hal Dresner, Warren B. Murphy, Rod Whitaker (screenplay); Clint Eastwood, George Kennedy, Vonetta McGee, Jack Cassidy, Heidi Brühl, Thayer David, Gregory Walcott, Reiner Schöne, Jean-Pierre Bernard, Brenda Venus, Michael Grimm, Frank Redmond	
M A Y	21	French Connection II	20th Century Fox	John Frankenheimer (director); Alexander Jacobs, Robert Dillon, Laurie Dillon (screenplay); Gene Hackman, Fernando Rey, Bernard Fresson, Philippe Léotard, Ed Lauter, Charles Millot, Jean-Pierre Castaldi, Cathleen Nesbitt, Reine Prat	
M A Y	21	The Return of the Pink Panther	United Artists / ITC Entertainment / Jewel Productions / Pimlico Films / Mirisch-Geoffrey	Blake Edwards (director/screenplay); Frank Waldman (screenplay); Peter Sellers, Christopher Plummer, Catherine Schell, Herbert Lom, Peter Arne, André Maranne, Grégoire Aslan, David Lodge, Burt Kwouk, Graham Stark, Mike Grady, Peter Jeffrey, Eric Pohlmann, Victor Spinetti, John Bluthal, Peter Jones	
M A Y	21	W.W. and the Dixie Dancekings	20th Century Fox / Triangle Productions	John G. Avildsen (director); Thomas Rickman (screenplay); Burt Reynolds, Conny Van Dyke, Jerry Reed, Ned Beatty, Art Carney, James Hampton, Don Williams, Rick Hurst, Mel Tillis, Furry Lewis	
M A Y	21	The Wild McCullochs	American International Pictures / Max Baer Productions	Max Baer Jr. (director/screenplay); Forrest Tucker, Julie Adams, Max Baer Jr., Janice Heiden, Dennis Redfield, Don Grady, Chip Hand, William Demarest, Harold J. Stone, Vito Scotti, Sandy McPeak, Lillian Randolph, Mike Mazurki, Billy Curtis, Biff Elliot, Kenneth Tobey, Doodles Weaver, Timothy Scott, James Gammon, Frederic Downs, Joe Sawyers, Matthew Greene, Mark Hall	
M A Y	22	Breakout	Columbia Pictures	Tom Gries (director); Elliott Baker (screenplay); Charles Bronson, Robert Duvall, Jill Ireland, John Huston, Randy Quaid, Sheree North, Alejandro Rey, Emilio Fernández, Paul Mantee, Alan Vint, Roy Jenson	
M A Y	22	The Wind and the Lion	United Artists / Herb Jaffe Productions	John Milius (director/screenplay); Sean Connery, Candice Bergen, Brian Keith, John Huston, Geoffrey Lewis, Vladek Sheybal, Steve Kanaly, Roy Jenson, Nadim Sawalha, Darrell Fetty, Marc Zuber, Antoine Saint-John, Deborah Baxter, Aldo Sambrell, Luis Barboo	
M A Y	23	Lepke	Warner Bros.	Menahem Golan (director); Wesley Lau, Tamar Hoffs (screenplay); Tony Curtis, Anjanette Comer, Milton Berle, Michael Callan, Warren Berlinger, Gianni Russo, Vic Tayback, Mary Charlotte Wilcox, Louis Guss, Vaughn Meader, Lillian Adams, Johnny Silver, Barry Miller	
M A Y	30	The Hiding Place	World Wide Pictures	James F. Collier (director); Allan Sloane, Lawrence Holben (screenplay); Julie Harris, Eileen Heckart, Arthur O'Connell, Jeannette Clift, Robert Rietti, Paul Henley, Lex van Delden, Nigel Hawthorne, John Gabriel, Edward Burnham, Cyril Shaps, Forbes Collins, Pamela Sholto, Richard Wren, Broes Hartman, Tom van Beek	
J U N E	1	Las Vegas Lady	Crown International Pictures / Zappala & Slott Productions	Noel Nosseck (director); Walter Dallenbach (screenplay); Stella Stevens, Stuart Whitman, George DiCenzo, Lynne Moody, Andrew Stevens, Karl Lukas, Frank Bonner, Linda Scruggs, Joseph Della Sorte, Hank Robinson, Emilia Dallenbach, Max Starky, Walter Smith, Jack Gordon, Stephanie Faulkner	
J U N E	1	Poor Pretty Eddie	Artaxerxes Productions / Michael Thevis Enterprises	David Worth, Richard Robinson (directors); Leslie Uggams, Shelley Winters, Michael Christian, Slim Pickens, Dub Taylor, Ted Cassidy	
J U N E	1	The Ultimate Warrior	Warner Bros.	Robert Clouse (director/screenplay); Yul Brynner, Max von Sydow, Joanna Miles, Richard Kelton, Lane Bradbury, William Smith, Darrell Zwerling, Mel Novak, Stephen McHattie, Henry Kingi, Gary Johnson, Mickey Caruso, Nate Esformes	
J U N E	4	Posse	Paramount Pictures / The Bryna Company	Kirk Douglas (director); Christopher Knopf, William Roberts (screenplay); Kirk Douglas, Bruce Dern, Bo Hopkins, James Stacy, Luke Askew, David Canary, Alfonso Arau, Katherine Woodville, Mark Roberts, Dick O'Neill, Melody Thomas Scott, Beth Brickell, Bill Burton, Louie Elias, Gus Greymountain, Allan Warnick, Roger Behrstock, Jess Riggle, Stephanie Steele	
J U N E	10	Love and Death	United Artists	Woody Allen (director/screenplay); Woody Allen, Diane Keaton, James Tolkan, Harold Gould, Olga Georges-Picot, Beth Porter, Zvee Scooler, Jessica Harper, Féodor Atkine, Despo Diamantidou, Yves Barsacq, Yves Brainville, Brian Coburn, Tony Jay, Howard Vernon, Aubrey Morris, Alfred Lutter, Lloyd Battista, Georges Adet, Sol Frieder, Frank Adu	
J U N E	11	Nashville	Paramount Pictures / ABC Motion Pictures	Robert Altman (director); Joan Tewkesbury (screenplay); David Arkin, Barbara Baxley, Ned Beatty, Karen Black, Ronee Blakley, Timothy Brown, Geraldine Chaplin, Robert DoQui, Shelley Duvall, Allen Garfield, Henry Gibson, Scott Glenn	
J U N E	11	Night Moves	Warner Bros. / Hiller Productions, Ltd. – Layton	Arthur Penn (director); Alan Sharp (screenplay); Gene Hackman, Susan Clark, Jennifer Warren, Edward Binns, Harris Yulin, Kenneth Mars, Janet Ward, James Woods, John Crawford, Melanie Griffith, Anthony Costello, Ben Archibek	
J U N E	15	Blazing Stewardesses	Independent-International Pictures	Al Adamson (director); Samuel M. Sherman, John R. D'Amato (screenplay); Yvonne De Carlo, Bob Livingston, Don "Red" Barry, The Ritz Brothers, Regina Carrol, T.A. King, Geoffrey Land, Connie Hoffman, Nicolle Riddell, Sheldon Lee, Carol Bilger, Jon Shank, Samuel M. Sherman	
J U N E	17	Bug	Paramount Pictures	Jeannot Szwarc (director); William Castle, Thomas Page (screenplay); Bradford Dillman, Joanna Miles, Richard Gilliland, Alan Fudge, Jesse Vint, Patty McCormack, Jamie Smith-Jackson, Brendan Dillon, Frederic Downs, James Greene, Jim Poyner	
J U N E	20	The Devil's Rain	Bryanston Distributing Company	Robert Fuest (director); Gabe Essoe, James Ashton, Gerald Hopman (screenplay); Ernest Borgnine, Eddie Albert, William Shatner, Ida Lupino, Tom Skerritt, Joan Prather, Keenan Wynn, John Travolta, George Sawaya, Anton LaVey, Diane LaVey, Woodrow Chambliss, Lisa Todd	
J U N E	20	Jaws	Universal Pictures / Zanuck/Brown Company	Steven Spielberg (director); Peter Benchley, Carl Gottlieb (screenplay); Roy Scheider, Robert Shaw, Richard Dreyfuss, Lorraine Gary, Murray Hamilton, Carl Gottlieb, Jeffrey Kramer, Susan Backlinie, Lee Fierro, Peter Benchley, Fritzi Jane Courtney, Steven Spielberg	
J U N E	20	Once Is Not Enough	Paramount Pictures	Guy Green (director); Julius J. Epstein (screenplay); Kirk Douglas, Alexis Smith, David Janssen, George Hamilton, Melina Mercouri, Brenda Vaccaro, Deborah Raffin, Gary Conway, Leonard Sachs, John Roper, Phil Foster, Lillian Randolph	
J U N E	20	That's the Way of the World	United Artists / Sig Shore Productions	Sig Shore (director); Robert Lipsyte (screenplay); Harvey Keitel, Ed Nelson, Earth, Wind & Fire	
J U N E	25	Bite the Bullet	Columbia Pictures / Persky-Bright Productions; Vista	Richard Brooks (director/screenplay); Gene Hackman, Candice Bergen, James Coburn, Ian Bannen, Jan-Michael Vincent, Ben Johnson, Robert Donner, Jean Willes, Dabney Coleman, Robert Hoy, Sally Kirkland, John McLiam, Mario Arteaga, Jerry Gatlin	
J U N E	25	Cooley High	American International Pictures	Michael Schultz (director); Eric Monte (screenplay); Glynn Turman, Lawrence Hilton-Jacobs, Garrett Morris, Steven Williams, Christine Jones, Jackie Taylor, Cynthia Davis, Sherman Smith, Norman Gibson, Corin Rogers, Joseph Carter Wilson, Maurice Marshall, Juanita McConnell	
J U N E	25	Rollerball	United Artists	Norman Jewison (director); William Harrison (screenplay); James Caan, John Houseman, Maud Adams, John Beck, Moses Gunn, Pamela Hensley, Barbara Trentham, Ralph Richardson, John Normington, Shane Rimmer, Burt Kwouk, Richard LeParmentier, Robert Ito, Nancy Bleier	
J U N E	27	Doc Savage: The Man of Bronze	Warner Bros.	Michael Anderson (director); Joe Morhaim, George Pal (screenplay); Ron Ely, Paul Gleason, William Lucking, Eldon Quick, Darrell Zwerling, Paul Wexler, Pamela Hensley, Robyn Hilton, Victor Millan, Paul Frees, Robert Tessier, Michael Berryman, Dar Robinson, Grace Stafford, Michael Miller, Bob Corso, Federico Roberto, Janice Helden, Carlos Rivas	
J U N E	27	Race with the Devil	20th Century Fox	Jack Starrett (director); Wes Bishop, Lee Frost (screenplay); Peter Fonda, Warren Oates, Loretta Swit, Lara Parker, R. G. Armstrong, Clay Tanner, Paul A. Partain, James N. Harrell, Jack Starrett, Paul Maslansky, Dan Hewitt Owens, Carol Blodgett, Ricci Ware, Karen Miller, Arkey Blue, Wes Bishop, John Buckley	

== July–September ==
Opening		Title	Production company	Cast and crew	Ref.
J U L Y	1	The Apple Dumpling Gang	Walt Disney Productions / Buena Vista Distribution	Norman Tokar (director); Don Tait (screenplay); Bill Bixby, Susan Clark, Don Knotts, Tim Conway, David Wayne, Slim Pickens, Harry Morgan, John McGiver, Don Knight	
J U L Y	2	Bucktown	American International Pictures	Arthur Marks (director); Bob Ellison (screenplay); Fred Williamson, Pam Grier, Thalmus Rasulala, Tony King, Bernie Hamilton, Art Lund, Tierre Turner, Carl Weathers, Morgan Upton, Jim Bohan	
J U L Y	2	Gone with the West	International Cine Film Corporation	Bernard Girard (director); Monroe Manning, Douglas Day Stewart, Marcus Demian (screenplay); James Caan, Stefanie Powers, Aldo Ray, Barbara Werle, Robert Walker Jr., Sammy Davis Jr., Heather Angel, Mike Lane, Michael Conrad, Anne Barton, Paul Bergen, Fred Book, Noel Drayton, James McHale, Pepper Martin, Elmore Vincent, L. Andy Stone, Elizabeth Leigh, Kenneth Adams, Anthony Gordon, Fabian Dean, Gillian Simpson, Chris Calabrese	
J U L Y	2	Walking Tall Part 2	American International Pictures / Bing Crosby Productions / Cinerama Releasing Corporation / Fuqua Industries / Wometco Enterprises	Earl Bellamy (director); Howard B. Kreitsek (screenplay); Bo Svenson, Richard Jaeckel, Bruce Glover, Robert DoQui, Noah Beery, Luke Askew, John Davis Chandler, Leif Garrett, Dawn Lyn, Logan Ramsey, Lurene Tuttle, Angel Tompkins, Frank McRae, Red West, Brooke Mills, Archie Grinalds, Allen Mullikin	
J U L Y	9	One of Our Dinosaurs is Missing	Walt Disney Productions / Buena Vista Distribution	Robert Stevenson (director); Bill Walsh (screenplay); Peter Ustinov, Helen Hayes, Clive Revill, Derek Nimmo, Joan Sims, Bernard Bresslaw, Hugh Burden	
J U L Y	9	Smile	United Artists	Michael Ritchie (director); Jerry Belson (screenplay); Bruce Dern, Barbara Feldon, Michael Kidd, Geoffrey Lewis, Eric Shea, Nicholas Pryor, Titos Vandis, Paul Benedict, William Traylor, Dennis Dugan, Joan Prather, Denise Nickerson, Melanie Griffith, Annette O'Toole, Colleen Camp, Kate Sarchet, Maria O'Brien, Carol Ann Williams, Shawn Christianson	
J U L Y	10	The Drowning Pool	Warner Bros. / First Artists	Stuart Rosenberg (director); Tracy Keenan Wynn, Lorenzo Semple Jr., Walter Hill (screenplay); Paul Newman, Joanne Woodward, Tony Franciosa, Murray Hamilton, Gail Strickland, Melanie Griffith, Richard Derr, Linda Haynes, Richard Jaeckel, Paul Koslo, Andrew Robinson, Coral Browne, Helena Kallianiotes, Joe Canutt, Andre Trottier	
J U L Y	11	Cleopatra Jones and the Casino of Gold	Warner Bros.	Charles Bail (director); William Tennant, Max Julien (screenplay); Tamara Dobson, Stella Stevens, Norman Fell, Albert Popwell, Caro Kenyatta	
J U L Y	16	White Line Fever	Columbia Pictures / International Cinemedia Center / White Line Fever Syndicate	Jonathan Kaplan (director/screenplay); Ken Friedman (screenplay); Jan-Michael Vincent, Kay Lenz, Sam Laws, Slim Pickens, L. Q. Jones, Don Porter, R. G. Armstrong, Leigh French, Dick Miller, Martin Kove	
J U L Y	23	Cover Girl Models	Filmgroup / New World Pictures	Cirio H. Santiago (director); Howard R. Cohen (screenplay); Pat Anderson, Lindsay Bloom, Tara Strohmeier, Mary Woronov, Vic Diaz, Tony Ferrer, John Kramer, Rhonda Leigh Hopkins, A.C. Castro, Nory Wright, Mark Lebeuse, Ken Metcalfe	
J U L Y	23	Return to Macon County	American International Pictures	Richard Compton (director/screenplay); Nick Nolte, Don Johnson, Robin Mattson, Eugene Daniels, Robert Viharo, Devon Ericson	
J U L Y	25	The Other Side of the Mountain	Universal Pictures / Filmways Pictures	Larry Peerce (director); David Seltzer (screenplay); Marilyn Hassett, Beau Bridges, Belinda J. Montgomery, Nan Martin, Dabney Coleman, Bill Vint, William Bryant, Hampton Fancher, William Roerick, Dori Brenner, Walter Brooke, Tony Becker, Griffin Dunne, Jocelyn Jones, Greg Mabrey	
J U L Y	26	Mandingo	Paramount Pictures / Dino De Laurentiis Company	Richard Fleischer (director); Norman Wexler (screenplay); James Mason, Susan George, Perry King, Richard Ward, Brenda Sykes, Ken Norton, Lillian Hayman, Sylvester Stallone	
J U L Y	30	The Wilby Conspiracy	United Artists / Baum/Dantine Productions / Optimus Productions Ltd.	Ralph Nelson (director); Rodney Amateau, Harold Nebenzal (screenplay); Sidney Poitier, Michael Caine, Nicol Williamson, Prunella Gee, Saeed Jaffrey, Persis Khambatta, Rijk de Gooyer, Rutger Hauer, Patrick Allen, Joe De Graft, Archie Duncan, Helmut Dantine	
J U L Y	31	The Candy Tangerine Man	Moonstone Entertainment	Matt Cimber (director); Mikel Angel (screenplay); John Daniels, George Buck Flower, Marilyn Joi, Eli Haines, Tom Hankason, Marva Farmer, Richard Kennedy, Meri McDonald, Talley Cochrane, Patrick Wright, Mikel Angel	
A U G U S T	3	Framed	Paramount Pictures	Phil Karlson (director); Mort Briskin (screenplay); Joe Don Baker, Conny Van Dyke, Gabriel Dell, John Marley, Brock Peters, John Larch, Paul Mantee, Walter Brooke, Joshua Bryant, Hunter von Leer, Les Lannom, Hard Boiled Haggerty, Lawrence Montaigne, Red West, Warren J. Kemmerling, Hoke Howell, Brenton Banks, Ken Lester, Henry O. Arnold, Gary Gober, Lloyd Tatum, Roy Jenson	
A U G U S T	7	That Lucky Touch	Fox-Rank / Allied Artists / De Grunwald Productions / Gloria Film	Christopher Miles (director); Moss Hart, John Briley, Monja Danischewsky (screenplay); Roger Moore, Susannah York, Shelley Winters, Lee J. Cobb, Jean-Pierre Cassel, Raf Vallone, Sydne Rome, Donald Sinden, Michael Shannon, Aubrey Woods, Julie Dawn Cole, Timothy Carlton, Alfred Hoffman, Vincent Hall, Fabian Cevallos, Takis Emmanuel	
A U G U S T	8	Farewell, My Lovely	AVCO Embassy Pictures / ITC Entertainment	Dick Richards (director); David Zelag Goodman (screenplay); Robert Mitchum, Charlotte Rampling, John Ireland, Sylvia Miles, Anthony Zerbe, Harry Dean Stanton, Jack O'Halloran, Joe Spinell, Sylvester Stallone, Rainbeaux Smith, Kate Murtagh, John O'Leary, Walter McGinn, Burton Gilliam, Jim Thompson, Jimmie Archer, Ted Gehring	
A U G U S T	13	Darktown Strutters	New World Pictures	William Witney (director); George Armitage (screenplay); Trina Parks, Edna Richardson, Shirley Washington, Roger E. Mosley, Stan Shaw, DeWayne Jessie, Norman Bartold, Dick Miller, Milt Kogan, Ed Bakey, Raymond Allen, Alvin Childress, Zara Cully, Bettye Sweet, Christopher Joy, Gene Simms, Sam Laws	
A U G U S T	13	The Land That Time Forgot	American International Pictures / Amicus Productions	Kevin Connor (director); Michael Moorcock, James Cawthorn (screenplay); Doug McClure, John McEnery, Susan Penhaligon, Keith Barron, Anthony Ainley, Godfrey James, Declan Mulholland, Roy Holder, Andrew McCulloch, Ron Pember, Brian Hall, Peter Sproule, Steve James	
A U G U S T	14	The Rocky Horror Picture Show	20th Century Fox / Michael White Productions	Jim Sharman (director/screenplay); Richard O'Brien (screenplay); Tim Curry, Susan Sarandon, Barry Bostwick, Richard O'Brien, Patricia Quinn, Little Nell, Jonathan Adams	
A U G U S T	20	Coonskin	Bryanston Distributing Company / Bakshi Productions / Albert S. Ruddy Productions	Ralph Bakshi (director/screenplay); Barry White, Charles Gordone, Philip Michael Thomas, Scatman Crothers, Al Lewis, Richard Paul, Frank de Kova, Ralph Bakshi, Theodore Wilson, Jesse Welles, Danny Rees, Buddy Douglas, Jim Moore	
A U G U S T	22	The Great McGonagall	Tigon British Film Productions	Joseph McGrath (director/screenplay); Spike Milligan (screenplay); Spike Milligan, Peter Sellers, Julia Foster, John Bluthal, Victor Spinetti, Valentine Dyall, Clifton Jones, Julian Chagrin, Charlie Young Atom	
A U G U S T	29	92 in the Shade	United Artists	Thomas McGuane (director/screenplay); Peter Fonda, Warren Oates, Margot Kidder, Burgess Meredith, Harry Dean Stanton, Elizabeth Ashley, Sylvia Miles, John Quade, Joe Spinell	
S E P T E M B E R	10	It Seemed Like a Good Idea at the Time	Gemstone Entertainment	John Trent (director/screenplay); Claude Harz, David Main (screenplay); Anthony Newley, Stefanie Powers, Isaac Hayes, Lloyd Bochner, Yvonne De Carlo, John Candy, Lawrence Dane, Henry Ramer	
S E P T E M B E R	10	Mitchell	Allied Artists Pictures Corporation	Andrew V. McLaglen (director); Ian Kennedy Martin (screenplay); Joe Don Baker, Linda Evans, Martin Balsam, John Saxon, Robert Phillips, Morgan Paull, Harold J. Stone, Merlin Olsen	
S E P T E M B E R	17	Swept Away	Medusa Distribuzione	Lina Wertmüller (director/screenplay); Giancarlo Giannini, Mariangela Melato, Isa Danieli, Riccardo Salvino, Aldo Puglisi, Eros Pagni	
S E P T E M B E R	18	Give 'em Hell, Harry!	Theater Television / Permut Presentations / Theatrovision	Steve Binder, Peter H. Hunt (directors); Samuel Gallu (screenplay); James Whitmore	
S E P T E M B E R	21	Dog Day Afternoon	Warner Bros. / Artists Entertainment Complex	Sidney Lumet (director); Frank Pierson (screenplay); Al Pacino, John Cazale, Charles Durning, Chris Sarandon, Penelope Allen, Sully Boyar, Susan Peretz, James Broderick, Lance Henriksen, Carol Kane, Marcia Jean Kurtz, John Marriott, Philip Charles MacKenzie, Dick Anthony Williams, Judith Malina, Dominic Chianese, Edwin "Chu Chu" Malave, Beulah Garrick, Sandra Kazan, Estelle Omens, Amy Levitt, Gary Springer, Lionel Pina	
S E P T E M B E R	24	Three Days of the Condor	Paramount Pictures / Dino De Laurentiis Corporation	Sydney Pollack (director); Lorenzo Semple Jr., David Rayfiel (screenplay); Robert Redford, Faye Dunaway, Cliff Robertson, Max von Sydow, John Houseman, Addison Powell, Walter McGinn, Tina Chen, Jess Osuna, Helen Stenborg, Patrick Gorman, Hansford Rowe, Carlin Glynn, Hank Garrett, James Keane, Sal Schillizzi, Sydney Pollack, Michael Kane, Don McHenry, Michael Miller, Dino Narizzano	
S E P T E M B E R	30	Black Moon	Cinema International Corporation (France) / Filmverlag der Autoren (West Germany)	Louis Malle (director/screenplay); Joyce Buñuel, Ghislain Uhry (screenplay); Cathryn Harrison, Therese Giehse, Joe Dallesandro, Alexandra Stewart	

== October–December ==
Opening		Title	Production company	Cast and crew	Ref.
O C T O B E R	3	The Master Gunfighter	Warner Bros. / Taylor-Laughlin Productions	Frank Laughlin (director); Tom Laughlin (screenplay); Tom Laughlin, Ron O'Neal, Lincoln Kilpatrick, Barbara Carrera, Burgess Meredith, Geo Anne Sosa, Victor Campos, Hector Elias	
O C T O B E R	5	Conduct Unbecoming	British Film / Lion International	Michael Anderson (director); Robert Enders (screenplay); Michael York, Richard Attenborough, Trevor Howard, Stacy Keach, Christopher Plummer, Susannah York, James Faulkner, James Donald, Michael Culver, Persis Khambatta, Helen Cherry, David Robb, Michael Byrne, Jamila Massey, Michael Fleming, David Purcell, Andrew Lodge, David Neville	
O C T O B E R	8	Hard Times	Columbia Pictures / Lawrence Gordon Productions	Walter Hill (director/screenplay); Bryan Gindoff, Bruce Henstell (screenplay); Charles Bronson, James Coburn, Jill Ireland, Strother Martin, Robert Tessier, Michael McGuire, Nick Dimitri, Margaret Blye, Thomas Jefferson, Bruce Glover, Frank McRae	
O C T O B E R	8	Hearts of the West	United Artists	Howard Zieff (director); Rob Thompson (screenplay); Jeff Bridges, Andy Griffith, Donald Pleasence, Blythe Danner, Alan Arkin, Richard B. Shull, Herbert Edelman, Alex Rocco, Frank Cady, Anthony James, Burton Gilliam, Matt Clark, Candice Azzara, Thayer David, Marie Windsor, Anthony Holland, Dub Taylor, William Christopher, Stuart Nisbet, Tucker Smith, Richard Stahl, Granville Van Dusen	
O C T O B E R	8	Mahogany	Paramount Pictures / Motown Productions	Berry Gordy (director); Bob Merrill, John Byrum (screenplay); Diana Ross, Billy Dee Williams, Jean-Pierre Aumont, Nina Foch, Beah Richards, Marisa Mell, Anthony Perkins, Jerome Arnold, Bruce Vilanch, Princess Irene Galitzine, Lenard Norris, Dan Daniel	
O C T O B E R	10	Lisztomania	Warner Bros. / Goodtimes Enterprises / Visual Programme Systems Ltd.	Ken Russell (director/screenplay); Roger Daltrey, Sara Kestelman, Paul Nicholas, Ringo Starr, Rick Wakeman, John Justin, Fiona Lewis, Little Nell, David English, Imogen Claire, Anulka Dziubinska, Murray Melvin, Andrew Faulds, Kenneth Colley, Veronica Quilligan, Andy Reilly, Rikki Howard, David Corti, Lucy Willers, Felicity Devonshire, Otto Diamant	
O C T O B E R	10	Royal Flash	20th Century Fox / Two Roads Productions	Richard Lester (director); George MacDonald Fraser (screenplay); Malcolm McDowell, Alan Bates, Florinda Bolkan, Oliver Reed, Tom Bell, Joss Ackland, Lionel Jeffries, Alastair Sim, Michael Hordern, Britt Ekland, Christopher Cazenove, Henry Cooper	
O C T O B E R	11	Let's Do It Again	Warner Bros. / First Artists / Verdon Productions Limited	Sidney Poitier (director); Richard Wesley (screenplay); Sidney Poitier, Bill Cosby, Calvin Lockhart, John Amos, Julius Harris, Denise Nicholas, Lee Chamberlin, Mel Stewart, Jimmie Walker, Ossie Davis, Billy Eckstine, Paul Harris, George Foreman, Jayne Kennedy, Rodolphus Lee Hayden	
O C T O B E R	12	The Divine Nymph	Analysis Film Releasing Corporation	Giuseppe Patroni Griffi (director/screenplay); Alfio Valdarnini (screenplay); Laura Antonelli, Terence Stamp, Marcello Mastroianni, Michele Placido, Duilio Del Prete, Ettore Manni, Carlo Tamberlani, Marina Berti, Doris Duranti, Tina Aumont, Corrado Annicelli, Cecilia Polizzi, Piero Di Iorio, Rita Silva, Gino Cassani	
O C T O B E R	12	Lies My Father Told Me	Columbia Pictures / Astral Films / Canadian Film Development Corporation	Ján Kadár (director); Ted Allan (screenplay); Len Birman, Marilyn Lightstone, Ted Allan, Barbara Chilcott, Carole Lazare, Cleo Paskal, Yossi Yadin, Jeffery Lynas, Henry Gamer, Mignon Elkins	
O C T O B E R	15	Whiffs	20th Century Fox / Brut Productions	Ted Post (director); Malcolm Marmorstein (screenplay); Elliott Gould, Eddie Albert, Harry Guardino, Godfrey Cambridge, Jennifer O'Neill, Don "Red" Barry, James Brown, Richard Masur, Howard Hesseman, Karl Lukas, Danny Wells, Viola Harris, Jack Colley	
O C T O B E R	17	Rooster Cogburn	Universal Pictures / Hal Wallis Productions	Stuart Millar (director); Martin Julien (screenplay); John Wayne, Katharine Hepburn, Anthony Zerbe, Richard Jordan, John McIntire, Strother Martin, Paul Koslo, Jack Colvin, Jon Lormer, Lane Smith, Warren Vanders, Richard Romancito, Tommy Lee, Jerry Gatlin	
O C T O B E R	19	Hester Street	Midwest Films	Joan Micklin Silver (director/screenplay); Steven Keats, Carol Kane, Doris Roberts, Mel Howard, Dorrie Kavanaugh, Lauren Friedman	
O C T O B E R	22	Diamonds	AVCO Embassy Pictures	Menahem Golan (director/screenplay); Arik Dichner (director); David Paulsen (screenplay); Robert Shaw, Richard Roundtree, Barbara Hershey, Shelley Winters, Shaike Ophir, Yosef Shiloach, Gadi Yagil, Yehuda Efroni	
O C T O B E R	24	The Giant Spider Invasion	Group 1 International Distribution Organization Ltd. / Transcentury Pictures	Bill Rebane (director); Robert Easton, Richard L. Huff (screenplay); Steve Brodie, Barbara Hale, Alan Hale Jr., Leslie Parrish, Robert Easton, Christiane Schmidtmer, Kevin Brodie, Bill Williams, Diane Lee Hart, Paul Bentzen, Tain Bodkin, J. Stewart Taylor, William W. Gillett Jr.	
O C T O B E R	29	Take a Hard Ride	20th Century Fox / Bernsen-Ludwig-Bercovici Productions	Anthony Dawson (director); Eric Bercovici, Jerrold L. Ludwig (screenplay); Jim Brown, Lee Van Cleef, Fred Williamson, Catherine Spaak, Jim Kelly, Dana Andrews, Barry Sullivan, Harry Carey Jr., Robert Donner, Charles McGregor, Ronald Howard, Buddy Joe Hooker, Leonard Smith, Ricardo Palacios, Robin (Baker) Levitt	
N O V E M B E R	5	Challenge to Be Free	Pacific International Enterprises	Tay Garnett (director); Anne Bosworth, Chuck D. Keen (screenplay); Mike Mazurki, John McIntire, Tay Garnett, Fritz Ford, Vic Christy, Jimmy Kane, Alex Van Bibber, Gordon Yardley, Bob McKinnon, Roger Reitano, Ted Yardley, Brian Russell, Connie Yardley, Patty Piper	
N O V E M B E R	5	Crazy Mama	New World Pictures	Jonathan Demme (director); Robert Thom (screenplay); Cloris Leachman, Stuart Whitman, Ann Sothern, Linda Purl, Jim Backus, Donny Most, Tisha Sterling, Sally Kirkland, Dick Miller, Harry Northup, John Milius, Beach Dickerson, Bill Paxton, Dennis Quaid	
N O V E M B E R	5	Overlord	Janus Films / Joswend	Stuart Cooper (director/screenplay); Christopher Hudson (screenplay); Brian Stirner, Davyd Harries, Nicholas Ball, Julie Neesam, John Franklyn-Robbins, Stella Tanner	
N O V E M B E R	5	Winterhawk	Howco International Pictures	Charles B. Pierce (director/screenplay); Kalai Strode, Earl E. Smith (screenplay); Leif Erickson, Woody Strode, Denver Pyle, L. Q. Jones, Elisha Cook Jr., Seamon Glass, Dennis Fimple, Arthur Hunnicutt, Dawn Wells, Michael Dante	
N O V E M B E R	6	Out of Season	EMI Film Distributors / Lorimar Productions	Alan Bridges (director); Eric Bercovici, Reuben Bercovitch (screenplay); Cliff Robertson, Vanessa Redgrave, Susan George, Edward Evans, Frank Jarvis	
N O V E M B E R	6	The Sunshine Boys	United Artists / Rastar	Herbert Ross (director); Neil Simon (screenplay); Walter Matthau, George Burns, Richard Benjamin, Lee Meredith, Carol Arthur, Rosetta LeNoire, F. Murray Abraham, Howard Hesseman, Ron Rifkin, Jennifer Lee, Fritz Feld, Archie Hahn, Tom Spratley, Milt Kogan, Steve Allen, Phyllis Diller, James Cranna, Jack Bernardi, Garn Stephens, Santos Morales	
N O V E M B E R	12	Stardust (U.S. Release date)	Anglo-EMI Film Distributors / Goodtimes Enterprises	Michael Apted (director); Ray Connolly (screenplay); David Essex, Adam Faith, Larry Hagman, Ines Des Longchamps, Rosalind Ayres, Marty Wilde, Edd Byrnes, Keith Moon, Dave Edmunds, Paul Nicholas, Karl Howman, Richard LeParmentier, Peter Duncan, John Normington, James Hazeldine, David Daker, David Jacobs, Ray Winstone	
N O V E M B E R	13	Inn of the Damned	Roadshow Entertainment	Terry Bourke (director/screenplay); Judith Anderson, Alex Cord, Michael Craig, Joseph Furst, Tony Bonner, John Meillon, Robert Quilter	
N O V E M B E R	14	A Boy and His Dog	LQ/Jaf Productions	L. Q. Jones (director/screenplay); Don Johnson, Susanne Benton, Alvy Moore, Jason Robards, Tim McIntire, Charles McGraw, Hal Baylor, Ron Feinberg, Michael Rupert, Helene Winston, Don Carter, Michael Hershman	
N O V E M B E R	19	The "Human" Factor	Bryanston Distribution / Eton / Avianca Features	Edward Dmytryk (director); Peter Powell, Thomas Hunter (screenplay); George Kennedy, John Mills, Raf Vallone, Rita Tushingham, Barry Sullivan, Arthur Franz	
N O V E M B E R	19	One Flew Over the Cuckoo's Nest	United Artists / Fantasy Films	Miloš Forman (director); Lawrence Hauben, Bo Goldman (screenplay); Jack Nicholson, Louise Fletcher, William Redfield, Will Sampson, Brad Dourif, Sydney Lassick, Christopher Lloyd, Danny DeVito, Dean Brooks, William Duell, Vincent Schiavelli, Michael Berryman, Nathan George, Marya Small, Scatman Crothers, Phil Roth, Louisa Moritz, Peter Brocco, Josip Elic, Ted Markland, Alonzo Brown, Mwako Cumbuka, Delos V. Smith Jr., Mimi Sarkisian	
N O V E M B E R	19	Permission to Kill	AVCO Embassy Pictures	Cyril Frankel (director); Robin Estridge (screenplay); Dirk Bogarde, Ava Gardner, Bekim Fehmiu, Timothy Dalton, Nicole Calfan, Frederic Forrest, John Levene, Klaus Wildbolz, Anthony Dutton, Peggy Sinclair, Dennis Branch, Alf Joint, Vladimir Popovic, Ratislav Plamenac, Oliver Schott, Erna Riedl, Paul Maxwell, John Serret, Anthony Forwood, François Baudet, Bob Sessions, Peter Garell, Friedrich Mönnig, Fritz von Friedl, Erwin Fischer	
N O V E M B E R	21	Mackintosh and T.J.	Penland Productions	Marvin J. Chomsky (director); Paul Savage (screenplay); Roy Rogers, Clay O'Brien, Billy Green Bush, Andrew Robinson, Joan Hackett, James Hampton, Dennis Fimple, Luke Askew, Walter Barnes, Edith Atwater, Ted Gehring, Larry Mahan, Dean Smith, James N. Harrell	
N O V E M B E R	22	Inserts	United Artists / Film and General Productions	John Byrum (director/screenplay); Richard Dreyfuss, Veronica Cartwright, Jessica Harper, Bob Hoskins, Stephen Davies	
N O V E M B E R	22	The Wrong Move	Axiom Films	Wim Wenders (director); Peter Handke (screenplay); Rüdiger Vogler, Hanna Schygulla, Marianne Hoppe, Nastassja Kinski, Hans Christian Blech, Peter Kern, Ivan Desny, Lisa Kreuzer	
N O V E M B E R	26	The Romantic Englishwoman	Fox-Rank / Dial Films / Les Productions Meric-Matalon	Joseph Losey (director); Tom Stoppard, Thomas Wiseman (screenplay); Glenda Jackson, Michael Caine, Helmut Berger, Michael Lonsdale, Béatrice Romand, Kate Nelligan, Nathalie Delon, Reinhard Kolldehoff, Anna Steele, Marcus Richardson, Julie Peasgood, Frankie Jordan, Tom Chatto, Frances Tomelty	
N O V E M B E R	27	Inside Out	Warner Bros. / Kettledrum Films	Peter Duffell (director); Judd Bernard, Stephen Schneck (screenplay); Telly Savalas, Robert Culp, James Mason, Günter Meisner, Aldo Ray, Adrian Hoven, Wolfgang Lukschy, Charles Korvin, Constantine Gregory, Richard Warner, Don Fellows, Doris Kunstmann, Lorna Dallas, Sigrid Hanack, Peter Schlesinger	
N O V E M B E R	29	Operation Daybreak	Warner Bros. / Howard R. Schuster, Inc. / American Allied Studios / Barrandov Studios	Lewis Gilbert (director); Ronald Harwood (screenplay); Timothy Bottoms, Anthony Andrews, Martin Shaw, Joss Ackland, Nicola Pagett, Anton Diffring, Carl Duering, Cyril Shaps, Diana Coupland, Ronald Radd, Kim Fortune, Ray Smith, George Sewell, Reinhard Kolldehoff, Kika Markham, Philip Madoc, Nigel Stock, Vernon Dobtcheff, Frank Gatliff, Pavla Matějovská, Jiri Krampol	
D E C E M B E R	3	Peeper	20th Century Fox	Peter Hyams (director); W. D. Richter (screenplay); Michael Caine, Natalie Wood, Kitty Winn, Michael Constantine, Timothy Agoglia Carey, Thayer David, Liam Dunn, Don Calfa, Margo Winkler, Dorothy Adams, Buffy Dee, Robert Ito, Liz Renay, Paul Jabara, Guy Marks	
D E C E M B E R	10	Against a Crooked Sky	Doty-Dayton Releasing	Earl Bellamy (director); Douglas C. Stewart, Eleanor Lamb (screenplay); Richard Boone, Stewart Petersen, Henry Wilcoxon, Clint Ritchie, Shannon Farnon, Jewel Blanch, Brenda Venus, Gordon Hanson, Geoffrey Land, Vince St. Cyr, Margaret Willey, Norman Walke, George Dale, Bar Killer	
D E C E M B E R	10	Sixpack Annie	American International Pictures / United Producers	Graydon F. David (director); Norman Winski, David Kidd, Wil David (screenplay); Lindsay Bloom, Joe Higgins, Larry Mahan, Raymond Danton, Pedro Gonzalez Gonzalez, Bruce Boxleitner, Louisa Moritz, Vince Barnett, Doodles Weaver, Ralph James, Stubby Kaye, Billy Barty, Jana Bellan, Richard Kennedy, Danna Hansen, Steve Randall, Ronald Marriott, Donald Elson, Oscar Cartier, Montana Smoyer, Terry Mace, Danny Michael Mann, Peter Dane	
D E C E M B E R	12	Psychic Killer	AVCO Embassy Pictures / Lexington Productions / Syn-Frank Enterprises	Ray Danton (director/screenplay); Greydon Clark, Mikel Angel (screenplay); Paul Burke, Jim Hutton, Julie Adams, Nehemiah Persoff, Neville Brand, Aldo Ray, Whit Bissell, Rod Cameron, Della Reese, Mary Charlotte Wilcox, Greydon Clark, Robin Raymond, Bill Quinn, Stack Pierce, Judith Brown, Joseph Della Sorte, Harry Holcombe, Jerry James, Diane Deininger, John Dennis, Marland Proctor, Walter O. Miles, Mello Alexandria, Sandra Rustam	
D E C E M B E R	14	The Adventure of Sherlock Holmes' Smarter Brother	20th Century Fox / Jouer Films	Gene Wilder (director/screenplay); Gene Wilder, Madeline Kahn, Marty Feldman, Dom DeLuise, Leo McKern, Roy Kinnear, Douglas Wilmer, Thorley Walters, George Silver, Nicholas Smith, John Le Mesurier, John Hollis, Aubrey Morris, Tommy Godfrey, Wolfe Morris, Julian Orchard, Kenneth Benda, Tony Sympson, Mel Brooks, Albert Finney, Anita Sharp-Bolster, Fred Wood	
D E C E M B E R	14	Deadly Hero	AVCO Embassy Pictures / City Time Partners	Ivan Nagy (director); George Wislocki, Don Petersen (screenplay); Don Murray, Diahn Williams, James Earl Jones, Lilia Skala, Conchata Ferrell, George S. Irving, Ron Weyand, Treat Williams, Hank Garrett, Dick Anthony Williams, Josh Mostel, Rutanya Alda, Charles Siebert, Beverly Johnson, Edwin "Chu Chu" Malave, Danny DeVito, Deborah Harry	
D E C E M B E R	14	The Reincarnation of Peter Proud	American International Pictures / Bing Crosby Productions / Cinerama Productions Corporation	J. Lee Thompson (director); Max Ehrlich (screenplay); Michael Sarrazin, Margot Kidder, Jennifer O'Neill, Paul Hecht, Albert Henderson, Debralee Scott, Steve Franken, Cornelia Sharpe, Tony Stephano, Anne Ives, Fred Stuthman	
D E C E M B E R	15	Emmanuelle 2	Parafrance Films	Francis Giacobetti (director/screenplay); Bob Elia (screenplay); Sylvia Kristel, Umberto Orsini, Venantino Venantini, Laura Gemser, Catherine Rivet, Frédéric Lagache, Caroline Laurence, Henry Czarniak, Tom Clark	
D E C E M B E R	17	Emilio and His Magical Bull			
D E C E M B E R	18	Barry Lyndon	Warner Bros. / Hawk Films / Peregrine Productions	Stanley Kubrick (director/screenplay); Ryan O'Neal, Marisa Berenson, Patrick Magee, Hardy Krüger, Gay Hamilton, Godfrey Quigley, Steven Berkoff, Marie Kean, Murray Melvin, Frank Middlemass, Leon Vitali, Leonard Rossiter, André Morell, Anthony Sharp	
D E C E M B E R	18	The Man Who Would Be King	Allied Artists Pictures Corporation	John Huston (director/screenplay); Gladys Hill (screenplay); Sean Connery, Michael Caine, Christopher Plummer, Saeed Jaffrey, Shakira Caine, Doghmi Larbi, Jack May, Albert Moses, Karroom Ben Bouih, Mohammad Shamsi, Paul Antrim, Graham Acres, PJ Retiree, The Blue Dancers of Goulamine	
D E C E M B E R	19	The Adventures of the Wilderness Family	Pacific International Enterprises	Stewart Raffill (director/screenplay); Arthur R. Dubs (screenplay); Robert Logan, Susan Damante-Shaw, George Buck Flower, Hollye Holmes, Ham Larsen	
D E C E M B E R	19	Bugs Bunny: Superstar	United Artists / Hare-Raising Films	Larry Jackson (director); Bob Clampett, Tex Avery, Friz Freleng, Orson Welles	
D E C E M B E R	19	Carry On Behind	The Rank Organisation	Gerald Thomas (director); Dave Freeman (screenplay); Kenneth Williams, Elke Sommer, Bernard Bresslaw, Kenneth Connor, Jack Douglas, Joan Sims, Windsor Davies, Peter Butterworth, Liz Fraser, Patsy Rowlands, Ian Lavender, Adrienne Posta	
D E C E M B E R	19	The Killer Elite	United Artists / Exeter Associates / Persky-Bright Associates	Sam Peckinpah (director); Marc Norman, Stirling Silliphant (screenplay); James Caan, Robert Duvall, Burt Young, Arthur Hill, Bo Hopkins, Mako, Gig Young, Tom Clancy, Tiana Alexandra, Takayuki Kubota, Victor Sen Yung, Helmut Dantine, Carole Mallory, George Kee Cheung, Uschi Digard, Kuo Lien Ying, Kate Heflin, Sondra Blake, Walter Kelley, Hank Hamilton, James Wing Woo, Tom Bush	
D E C E M B E R	20	Snow White and the Seven Dwarfs (re-release)	Walt Disney Productions / Buena Vista Distribution	David Hand, William Cottrell, Wilfred Jackson, Larry Morey, Perce Pearce, Ben Sharpsteen (directors); Ted Sears, Richard Creedon, Otto Englander, Dick Rickard, Earl Hurd, Merrill De Maris, Dorothy Ann Blank, Webb Smith (screenplay); Adriana Caselotti, Lucille La Verne, Harry Stockwell, Roy Atwell, Pinto Colvig, Otis Harlan, Scotty Mattraw, Billy Gilbert, Eddie Collins, Jimmy MacDonald, Moroni Olsen, Stuart Buchanan	
D E C E M B E R	25	Aaron Loves Angela	Columbia Pictures	Gordon Parks Jr. (director); Gerald Sanford (screenplay); Moses Gunn, Kevin Hooks, Irene Cara, Robert Hooks, Ernestine Jackson, Charles McGregor, José Feliciano, Walt Frazier, Norman Evans, Leon Pinkney, Wanda Velez, Lou Quinones, Andre La Corbiere, Alex Stevens, William Graeff Jr.	
D E C E M B E R	25	The Black Bird	Columbia Pictures / Rastar	David Giler (director/screenplay); George Segal, Stéphane Audran, Lionel Stander, Lee Patrick, Elisha Cook Jr., Felix Silla, Richard B. Shull, Ken Swofford, John Abbott, Vic Tayback, Signe Hasso, Connie Kreski, Howard Jeffrey, Al Silvani, David Giler, Manu Tupou	
D E C E M B E R	25	Breakheart Pass	United Artists / Gershwin-Kastner Productions	Tom Gries (director); Alistair MacLean (screenplay); Charles Bronson, Ben Johnson, Richard Crenna, Jill Ireland, Charles Durning, Ed Lauter, Bill McKinney, David Huddleston, Roy Jenson, Rayford Barnes, Scott Newman, Robert Tessier, Paul Frees, Joe Kapp, Archie Moore, Sally Kirkland, Eddie Little Sky, John Mitchum, Read Morgan, Casey Tibbs, Doug Atkins, Sally Kemp, Keith McConnell, Robert Rothwell, Eldon Burke, Irv Faling, William Klein, Ron Ponozzo	
D E C E M B E R	25	Friday Foster	American International Pictures	Arthur Marks (director); Orville Hampton (screenplay); Pam Grier, Yaphet Kotto, Godfrey Cambridge, Thalmus Rasulala, Ted Lange, Eartha Kitt, Jim Backus, Scatman Crothers, Tierre Turner, Paul Benjamin, Jason Bernard, Edmund Cambridge, Julius Harris, Rosalind Miles, Carl Weathers, John Anthony Bailey, Mel Carter	
D E C E M B E R	25	The Hindenburg	Universal Pictures	Robert Wise (director); Nelson Gidding, Richard Levinson, William Link (screenplay); George C. Scott, Anne Bancroft, William Atherton, Roy Thinnes, Gig Young, Burgess Meredith, Charles Durning, Richard Dysart, Rolfe Sedan, Robert Clary, René Auberjonois, Peter Donat, Ted Gehring, Alan Oppenheimer, Katherine Helmond, Jean Rasey, Joanna Cook Moore, Stephen Elliott, Val Bisoglio, William Sylvester, Greg Mullavey, Simon Scott, Joe Turkel, Sandy Ward, Herbert Morrison, David Mauro, Joyce Davis, Colby Chester, Michael Richardson, Herbert Nelson, Scott Walker	
D E C E M B E R	25	Hustle	Paramount Pictures	Robert Aldrich (director); Steve Shagan (screenplay); Burt Reynolds, Catherine Deneuve, Ben Johnson, Paul Winfield, Eileen Brennan, Eddie Albert, Ernest Borgnine, Jack Carter, James Hampton, Colleen Brennan, Catherine Bach, Robert Englund, Chuck Hayward, David Spielberg, Naomi Stevens, Med Flory, Hal Baylor, Don "Red" Barry, Karl Lukas, Dave Willock, Queenie Smith, George Memmoli, Fred Willard, Jason Wingreen, Victoria Carroll, Anouk Aimée, Dick Enberg, Lance Fuller, Deanna Lund, Jean-Louis Trintignant	
D E C E M B E R	25	Lucky Lady	20th Century Fox / Gruskoff/Venture Films	Stanley Donen (director); Gloria Katz, Willard Huyck (screenplay); Liza Minnelli, Gene Hackman, Burt Reynolds, Geoffrey Lewis, John Hillerman, Robby Benson, Michael Hordern, Anthony Holland, John McLiam, Val Avery, Louis Guss, William Bassett, Roger Cudney, Joe Estevez, Emilio Fernández, Basil Hoffman, Milt Kogan, Ron Masak, Frank Tallman, Susanne Zenor	
D E C E M B E R	25	Ride a Wild Pony	Walt Disney Productions / Buena Vista Distribution	Don Chaffey (director); Rosemary Anne Sisson (screenplay); Robert Bettles, Eva Griffith, Michael Craig, John Meillon, Alfred Bell, Roy Haddrick, Peter Gwynne, Melissa Jaffer, Lorraine Bayly, Wendy Playfair, Kate Clarkson, Jessica Noad, Neva Carr Glyn, Gerry Duggan	

== See also ==
- 1975 in the United States
