= Digard =

Digard is a surname. Notable people with the surname include:

- Didier Digard (born 1986), French footballer
- Uschi Digard (born 1948), Swedish former softcore porn star and model

== See also ==
- DiGard Motorsports, a championship-winning race team in NASCAR Winston Cup
