= Cherry, Harry & Raquel! =

1970 film by Russ Meyer

- Original film poster
- Directed by: Russ Meyer
- Written by: Russ Meyer; Tom McGowan
- Produced by: Russ Meyer
- Starring: Larissa Ely; Linda Ashton; Charles Napier
- Cinematography: Russ Meyer
- Edited by: Russ Meyer
- Production company: Eve Productions Inc.
- Distributed by: Panamint Films
- Release date: November 26, 1969
- Running time: 71 min.
- Country: United States
- Language: English
- Box office: $7.25 million

Cherry, Harry & Raquel! is a 1969 American action comedy and exploitation film, produced and directed by American film director Russ Meyer. The plot involves the smuggling of marijuana, and the attraction between a female writer and an English nurse.

Following the success of Vixen! (1968), the film is notable for the first appearance of actor (and Meyer regular) Charles Napier playing Harry Thompson, a California border sheriff and cannabis smuggler who makes a reappearance in 1975's Supervixens.

Napier's nude scene with Larissa Ely, where they run in the desert, is the first instance of full frontal male nudity in a Meyer picture. The appearance of a penis in a movie in 1969 was still a novelty, and was reported on by the Associated Press after the movie was released and became a hit.

Uschi Digard, who would also go on to make frequent appearances in Meyer's films, was cast as the naked muse of the Apache character. Shown in cut scenes usually wearing only an Apache headdress, this plot device was necessitated after the lead actress left the shoot early and there was 20 minutes of footage needed to complete the film.

== Plot ==
The film begins with a monotone narration about the developing evil of marijuana in modern society and the need for vigilance in stopping the actions of the "pushers" and the "smugglers".

Harry, a small town border sheriff, lives at the site of a defunct silver mine with his girlfriend Cherry, an Englishwoman who works as a nurse. The blonde Raquel is a writer and works to sexually pleasure the local men for the enjoyment of it. Cherry and Raquel are intrigued with meeting each other, but Harry prevents this meeting as he feels that the idea of two women having sex is "un-American".

Harry and his Mexican-American associate Enrique, work for local politician Mr. Franklin, in an operation in which they divert marijuana through the border. Mr. Franklin informs Harry that their associate "Apache" has gone into business for himself and must be killed. Harry summons Enrique, who is in bed with Raquel, and they go to the desert to look for Apache in order to carry out their plan. They fail and Apache gets away and manages to steal Harry's jeep.

Frustrated with repeated failures to kill Apache, Mr. Franklin calls Harry to tell him he is taking too long and that now Enrique also needs to be killed because he knows too much. They set Enrique up to deliver drugs to the mine where Harry will kill him. En route to the mine, however, Enrique is killed in the desert by Apache who brutally runs him down with Harry's jeep. When Raquel arrives at the hospital where Mr. Franklin is staying to sexually service him, she finds he also has been murdered by Apache.

Raquel is in the hospital recovering from the shock of finding Mr. Franklin dead. Her assigned care nurse turns out to be Cherry. When Cherry enters her room for nursing duties, Raquel produces a small case containing marijuana cigarettes. They share a couple of joints, then dance naked together and have a sexual experience.

Meanwhile, Harry is alone at the mine, still waiting for Enrique. Apache shows up instead, driving up in Harry's jeep and taunting him with the horn. Harry comes out shooting and they trade multiple gunshots. Finally, after each having been shot several times, Harry drops dead and Apache falls dead on top of him while Cherry and Raquel continue to have sex in the hospital.

The narrator then ruminates on the message the film carries and the characters we have just seen, after which the twist ending reveals that the entire story has been fiction, and that Raquel herself is the author. After finishing her manuscript on a typewriter, Harry reads a page and passes it to his friend Tom. Tom, who had sex with Raquel at the beginning of the film, shares a knowing look with her.

The final shot is of a naked lady running happily through a grassland.

== Cast ==
- Charles Napier as Harry
- Linda Ashton as Cherry
- Larissa Ely as Raquel
- Frank Bolger as Mr. Franklin
- Bert Santos as Enrique
- Uschi Digard as Soul
- Robert Aiken as Tom
- Michaelani as Dr. Lee
- Michelle Grand as Millie
- John Milo as Apache
- Danny Roberts as Delivery Boy

== Production ==
Roger Ebert claimed that after filming was completed, the De Luxe color lab inadvertently destroyed a fourth of Meyer's footage, requiring Meyer to shoot new scenes. He hired Uschi to appear in some new footage as an Indian and intercut it with the existing footage. According to Ebert, "The result is that audiences don't even realize anything is missing; a close analysis might reveal some cavernous gaps in the plot, and it is a little hard to figure out exactly how (or if) all the characters know each other, but Meyer's subjective scenes are so inventive and his editing so confident that he simply sweeps the audience right along with him. Cherry, Harry and Raquel is possibly the only narrative film ever made without a narrative."

Meyer denied that the lab lost footage but admitted to shooting new sequences. He recalled "one of the leading ladies couldn't stand the rigors of Panamint Valley [the location of the film]. She had a couple of pomeranians, and she would lock them inside all day, and they would just devastate the room. We had a real redneck hotel owner, who was drunk all the time-like Chill Wills, only fatter-and he'd yell about her 'goddam dogs.' She took such offense - the very idea this man would object to her dogs using the rug. Finally about nine day before we finished, she said, 'I've had it. I'm going home.'"

The film had to be reshot. "The picture's better because of her leaving," said Meyer. "We had to really reach for another ending. She went and you just never saw her again."

== Reception ==
In 1980 Meyer said "The picture is the most successful film I have on cable television-or hotel-vision-because you never have to come in at the beginning. It doesn't matter. It could be a loop."

=== Critical ===
The New York Times called it "a rotten film. Its story... bleeds towards the edges like red pajamas being washed for the first time... Yet the celluloid stinks with hard vitality."

The Los Angeles Times called it "lots of fun".

Filmink argued the film "features two women happily going at it intercut with scenes of two men pointlessly shooting each other to death, making a surprisingly affecting point about sex being more worthwhile than violence."
