= Chesty Anderson, USN =

1976 film by Ed Forsyth

Chesty Anderson, U.S. Navy
- Directed by: Ed Forsyth
- Written by: H. F. Green; Paul Pompian
- Produced by: Philip J. Hacker; Paul Pompian
- Starring: Shari Eubank; Dorrie Thomson; Rosanne Katon
- Cinematography: Henning Schellerup
- Distributed by: Atlas Films
- Release date: November 1976 (U.S.)
- Running time: 88 minutes
- Country: United States
- Language: English

Chesty Anderson, U.S. Navy is a 1976 R-rated comedy film featuring Shari Eubank as Chesty Anderson, a WAVE (Woman Accepted for Volunteer Emergency Service) in the United States Navy.

When one of her friends goes missing, Chesty and several fellow WAVEs go looking for her and end up in a world of senatorial corruption and Mafia intimidation.

== Cast ==
- Shari Eubank as Chesty
- Dorrie Thomson as Tina
- Rosanne Katon as Cocoa
- Marcie Barkin as Pucker
- Constance Marie as Baby
- Fred Willard as Peter Linden
- George Cooper as Senator Dexter
- Frank Campanella as The Baron
- Timothy Carey as Vincent "The Terrible"
- Phil Hoover as Michael
- Tim Wade as "Ferret"
- Scatman Crothers as Ben Benson
- Mel Carter as Sam Benson
- John Davis Chandler as Dr. Cheech
- Betty McGuire as CPO
- Lynne Guthrie as Lieutenant Ambrose
- Brenda Fogarty as Brenda
- Joyce Mandel as Suzi
- Roy Applegate as Phil
- Stanley Brock as Dr. Finkle
- Dyanne Thorne as Nurse
- Uschi Digard as Baron's Girlfriend #1
- Pat Parker as Baron's Girlfriend #2
- Betty Thomas as Party Guest #1
- Deborah Harmon as Party Guest #2
- Adair Jameson as Party Guest #3
- Pam Rice as Party Guest #4
- Murphy Dunne as Reporter #1
