= Phyllis Hodges Boyce =

American actress (1936–2010)

- Born: Phyllis Callow; July 24, 1936; Los Angeles, California, U.S.
- Died: May 12, 2010 (aged 73); Palm Springs, California, U.S.
- Other name: Phyllis Douglas
- Occupation: Actress
- Years active: 1939–1971
- Known for: Batman: (The Joker's Last Laugh / The Joker's Epitaph); Star Trek: The Original Series (The Galileo Seven)
- Spouses: Macgregor Douglas (m. 1954; div. 19??); Robert B. Boyce (m. 19??–2010; her death)
- Children: 3

Phyllis Hodges Boyce (née Callow, July 24, 1936 – May 12, 2010) was an American actress, appearing in movies and television serials. She was often credited as Phyllis Douglas.

The daughter of director Ridgeway Callow and former Ziegfeld Girl Margaret "Peggy" Watts, Boyce was one of the last surviving cast members of Gone with the Wind (1939), in which she appeared, at the age of two in an uncredited role as Bonnie Blue Butler (along with Cammie King). She also appeared in two episodes of the original Star Trek television series, "The Galileo Seven" (1967) and "The Way to Eden" (1969), and in the 1967 two-parter "The Joker's Last Laugh / The Joker's Epitaph", of the TV series Batman. After her acting career ended, she sold real estate. She died in 2010.

== Filmography ==
=== Film ===
Year	Film	Role	Notes
1939	Gone with the Wind	Bonnie Blue Butler - Age 2 (uncredited)	Romance war film
1948	Canon City	Myrna	
1957	The Joker Is Wild	Chorine (uncredited)	
1957	Until They Sail	Local Girl (uncredited)	
1957	Raintree County	Undetermined Secondary Role (uncredited)	
1958	Handle with Care	Student (uncredited)	
1958	Andy Hardy Comes Home	Girl #1 (uncredited)	
1959	Night of the Quarter Moon	Teenager (uncredited)	
1959	The Beat Generation	Beatnik (uncredited)	
1959	Girls Town	Eleanor	
1960	Cimarron	Sadie (uncredited)	Romance war film
1961	Atlantis, the Lost Continent	Girl (uncredited)	Adventure science fiction film
1971	Wild Rovers	(uncredited)	Western film

=== Television ===
Year	Title	Role	Notes
1965	Sally and Sam	Nurse	Television film
1967	Star Trek	Yeomen Mears	Episode: "The Galileo Seven"
1967	Batman	Josie Miller	Episode: "The Joker's Last Laugh", "The Joker's Epitaph"
1969	Star Trek	Girl #2 (Mavig)	Episode: "The Way to Eden"
1971	Medical Center	Telethon Girl #2	Episode: "Countdown"
