= Hard Times (1975 film) =

1975 film by Walter Hill

- Theatrical release poster
- Directed by: Walter Hill
- Screenplay by: Walter Hill; Bryan Gindoff; Bruce Henstell
- Story by: Bryan Gindoff; Bruce Henstell
- Produced by: Lawrence Gordon
- Starring: Charles Bronson; James Coburn; Jill Ireland; Strother Martin
- Cinematography: Philip H. Lathrop
- Edited by: Roger Spottiswoode
- Music by: Barry De Vorzon
- Production company: Lawrence Gordon Productions
- Distributed by: Columbia Pictures
- Release date: October 8, 1975 (United States)
- Running time: 93 minutes
- Country: United States
- Language: English
- Budget: $2.7 million or $3.1 million
- Box office: $26.5 million

Hard Times (Note: Known as The Streetfighter in some regions.) is a 1975 action drama sport film co-written and directed by Walter Hill in his directorial debut. It stars Charles Bronson as Chaney, a mysterious drifter freighthopping through Louisiana during the Great Depression, who proves indomitable in illegal bare-knuckled boxing matches after forming a partnership with the garrulous hustler Speed, played by James Coburn.

== Plot ==
In 1933, an older man named Chaney watches a bare-knuckled street fight, on which bets are made. The fighter, backed by the cocky, fast-talking "Speed" loses badly. Chaney talks a very skeptical Speed into letting him fight the winner. Chaney bets all of the six dollars he has on himself and quickly dispatches his younger opponent. Chaney and a suitably impressed Speed travel to New Orleans to match Chaney against local fighters at long odds, recruiting genteel drug addict Poe as a cutman. Between fights, Chaney finds a down-on-her-luck woman named Lucy Simpson to sleep with.

For the next fight against local brawling champ Jim Henry, Speed gets a loan from a gang of local mobsters headed by Doty to pay sponsor/fish tycoon Chick Gandil. Chick then unexpectedly raises the stakes to $3000 instead of the usual $1000. To cover the shortfall, Speed sets up a fight at odds with a Southerner named Pettibone.

Chaney easily disposes of his next opponent, a Cajun. When Pettibone, the loser's sponsor, refuses to pay off his bet, Chaney advises Speed to leave, as they are greatly outnumbered by the locals, but suggests they return later. That night, Chaney sneaks into Pettibone's honky-tonk joint, brandishes a gun, flattens the hood's goons, shoots up the place, and gets the winnings from Pettibone after clubbing him with the pistol.

Chaney's next fight is against Gandil's man, John Henry. Chaney wins this fight handily, but gambling addict Speed blows all his winnings in a backroom crape, leaving him unable to repay the loan sharks.

Afterwards, Gandil wants to buy part of Chaney, but Chaney refuses. With the loan sharks ready to injure Speed, Gandil instead pays off Speed's debt and takes him hostage. Chaney must wager his entire winnings to take on a prize fighter imported from Chicago named Street, or Speed will be killed. Chaney does not want to rescue Speed from his own folly, despite Poe's pleas. His relationship with Lucy ends as she finds a new man who offers more stability and has a “real job.”

Chaney shows for the bout with Street. The Chicago fighter proves a worthy foe, but Chaney gradually gets the upper hand. When Street is knocked down and is on his hands and knees, Gandil slams two metal cylinders on the ground for him to wrap his fists around, but Street is too proud to cheat. Chaney then finishes him off.

Afterward, Chaney gives Speed and Poe a generous cut of the winnings and leaves town, instructing Poe to take care of his stray cat.

== Cast ==
- Charles Bronson as Chaney
- James Coburn as Spencer "Speed" Weed
- Jill Ireland as Lucy Simpson
- Strother Martin as Poe
- Margaret Blye as Gayleen Schoonover, Speed's girlfriend
- Michael McGuire as Chick Gandil
- Felice Orlandi as Le Beau
- Edward Walsh as Pettibone
- Bruce Glover as Doty
- Robert Tessier as Jim Henry
- Nick Dimitri as Street
- Frank McRae as Hammerman
- Maurice Kowalewski as Caesare
- Naomi Stevens as Madam
- Lyla Hay Owen as Waitress
- John Creamer as Apartment Manager
- Robert Castleberry as Counterman
- Becky Allen as Poe's Date
- Thomas Jefferson (uncredited cameo)

== Production ==
=== Development ===
In the early 1970s Walter Hill had developed a strong reputation as a screenwriter, particularly of action films such as The Getaway. He was approached by Larry Gordon when the latter was head of production at AIP, who offered Hill the chance to direct one of his scripts. (AIP had recently done this with John Milius on Dillinger (1973).) Gordon subsequently moved over to Columbia, where he established a unit making low budget action films, and got funding for Hill's project; it was to be the first from Gordon's unit.

Hill wrote and directed for scale even though "the truth is, I would have paid them for the chance."

The project began as an original screenplay by Bryan Gindoff and Bruce Henstell called The Streetfighter.

Hill thought the project could become more "up market" if he made it more like a Western and set it in the past; Gordon was from New Orleans and suggested setting it in that city. Hill says the script incorporated elements of an earlier Western he had written, Lloyd Williams and his Brother (which also had a fighting component). He wrote it in a style inspired by Alexander Jacobs – "extremely spare, almost Haiku style. Both stage directions and dialogue."

Hill wrote one draft, then rewrote it "five or six times before I finally got it. But I did get it and I knew it. I knew it was going to get an actor and get made."

=== Casting ===
Hill says he originally wrote the film intending to cast a younger actor, like Jan Michael Vincent, and that he wanted Warren Oates to play Coburn's role. According to Hill, "they had offered it to a couple of actors and they didn't want to do it." Then it was sent to Charles Bronson even though Hill thought he was "too old". A day later, Bronson's agent called back and said Bronson had read the script and wanted to do the film "but he had to meet me. He wanted to see if I measured up."

Hill remembers that Bronson "was in remarkable physical condition for a guy his age; I think he was about 52 at the time. He had excellent coordination, and a splendid build. His one problem was that he was a smoker, so he didn't have a lot of stamina. I mean, he probably could have kicked anybody's ass on that movie, but he couldn't fight much longer than 30 or 40 seconds." Hill later said Bronson received "very close to a million" dollars for his role.

The second lead went to James Coburn, who then was shifting from lead roles to support parts.

=== Pre-production ===
The film was shot on location in Louisiana. Hill says his cinematographer Philip Lathrop was incredibly useful during the shoot:

Before we started I was in my office later at night and Lathrop came by, noted I wasn't in a good mood. "Anything wrong?" I had never done it, worried if I will make it look alright. He immediately said "Don't worry about that. We will make a film, make the shots. If you are having a problem we will make the shots. I can already tell you you are ahead of other directors." He said "Anything we shoot we will cut together." He said "The problem that you're going to have is making everybody getting along and you getting what you want." And he was of course 100 percent right. That is the problem with direction. Beyond my first or second film, I don't think I've ever had terrible dilemmas based upon resources, but shooting and figuring out how is not a problem, never was. The problems that you have are getting everybody to be on the same page.

Hill says that Bronson was more supportive to work with than Coburn:

[Bronson was a] very angry guy ... Didn't get along with a lot of people. The only reason I can tell you he and I got along well was he respected that I wrote the script. He liked the script. Also I didn't try to get close to him. Kept it very business-like. I think he liked that. Jimmy Coburn who everybody liked and got along well with, he and I did not get along well. I think he was not in a good mood about being in a movie with Charlie, it was second banana. He had been up there more, and his career was coming back a bit. I don't think he was wild about being second banana. But Charlie was a big star, perceived to be low rent. That was part of his anger ... He thought there was a cosmic injustice when he was not a movie star at 35. He didn't get there till 45 or whatever ... [However] When things had seemed to not be working well, or there was some impasse, Charlie would come down hard on my side. That was tipping point.

Hill had troubles with Strother Martin. "When he was good he was very good, but he could be just awful", Hill later said. "I said to him once, 'Divide it in half, Strother,' and he said 'In half,' and I answered, 'That's if you want it to be in the movie.'"

Hill said he used few tracking shots and zoom shots because "I like to work within frame and composition, but when you move your camera you can lose composition because it is altering shape." He also decided to use background music quiet and subdued "to get a sense of restraint in the movie ... people fighting is an ugly thing and I didn't want to encourage people to go out and fight. The concept of movie was hopefully legendary and somewhat heroic so that one couldn't really take a realistic approach."

Hill said the fights were "dances. That is why there was no blood. People commented, "the fights are great but they would have been better if you had put some blood in them." What they don't realize is as soon as you put blood in those fights they would then have gotten so real that they would have lost their dramatic truth."

The original cut of the movie was around two hours long. When it was cut down to around 90 minutes several fight scenes were deleted. Some stills however show some of the deleted fights.

Hill described the music as "kind of western; kind of simple and country. Nicely understated. "

== Release ==
The film was profitable and in 2009, Hill said he was still receiving money from it.

"It was the best deal I ever made", he recalled. "Got a career out of it. Picture was well received on the whole, made money. Got me off and going."

However he never made another film with Bronson. "We had kind of a falling out over the film," the director said. "He thought I'd been a little too ... how do I put this? Too draconian in my editing of his wife's (Jill Ireland's) scenes."

The movie established a template to which Hill often returned.

My heroes usually have a very talkative foil opposite them or reluctantly alongside them, such as Bruce Dern in The Driver, or Eddie Murphy in 48 Hrs, or James Coburn in Hard Times. I like the kind of dialogue between people who have a mutual goal but very disparate appetites and needs, so that there's always a kind of friction that runs throughout the film. They don't like each other very much, and hopefully the movie supplies a reason for them to achieve a grudging kind of respect for each other.

== Reception ==
=== Critical response ===
The film has a 71% fresh rating on the film review aggregation website Rotten Tomatoes based on 89 critic's reviews. The consensus summarizes: "Hard Times occasionally gets knocked down by its slight and overly brutish narrative, but strong performances, atmospheric grit, and Walter Hill's sparse direction elevate it into a compellingly pulpy fable."

Pauline Kael called the setting of Hard Times "elaborate period recreations that seem almost to be there for their own sake." The film is about the personalities of street fighters and their agents, people on the margins of society. On the other hand, setting the film in the Depression might have been a way for Hill to make Chaney a more sympathetic character. Kael explains, "Put [Charles Bronson] in modern clothes and he's a hard-bitten tough guy, but with that cap on he's one of the dispossessed—an honest man who's known hunger."

Roger Ebert in his October 14, 1975, review of Hard Times in the Chicago Sun-Times called it "a powerful, brutal film containing a definitive Charles Bronson performance".

== See also ==
- List of American films of 1975
- List of boxing films
- List of cult films
