= Handle with Care (1958 film) =

US drama film from 1958

- Directed by: David Friedkin
- Written by: Morton S. Fine; David Friedkin; Samuel Grafton; Edith Grafton
- Produced by: Morton S. Fine
- Starring: Dean Jones; Joan O'Brien; Thomas Mitchell; Royal Dano
- Cinematography: Harold J. Marzorati
- Edited by: Ben Lewis
- Music by: Alexander Courage
- Production company: Metro-Goldwyn-Mayer
- Distributed by: Metro-Goldwyn-Mayer
- Release date: April 18, 1958
- Running time: 82 minutes
- Country: United States
- Language: English
- Budget: $426,000
- Box office: $325,000

Handle with Care is a 1958 American drama film directed by David Friedkin and starring Dean Jones, Joan O'Brien and Thomas Mitchell. It was produced and distributed by Metro-Goldwyn-Mayer.

== Plot ==
Law school professor Roger Bowdin prepares his seniors for their yearly "mock trial," but star student Zachary Davis persists in wanting something more than the usual fake case. He gets the professor to agree to have the aspiring lawyers investigate the town itself, then put it on trial for anything they happen to find.

Good-natured mayor Dick Williston goes along with the project when the professor approaches him about it, happy to cooperate with the class. The overzealous Zach begins to concern girlfriend Mary Judson, his roommate Bill Reeves, and others with the way he begins digging up potential controversies and scandals. His father having once been incarcerated for corruption in another town, Zach may have a personal vendetta in trying to implicate others.

On the first day of the trial, with Mary assisting him as prosecuting attorney, Bill as jury foreman and the professor as presiding judge, Zach aggressively goes after the mayor with a number of unsubstantiated charges. When he brings up a potential tax malfeasance involving misappropriated funds, the popular mayor refuses to continue. Zach is promptly shunned in town, fired from his job and asked to leave by his landlady. A farmer, Al Rees, confronts him on the street, implying that Zach doesn't know what he's doing.

The headstrong Zach refuses to relent, even when Mary points out that she wants to keep living in this town after they marry. Returning to the witness stand, the mayor explains how funds were used temporarily to keep farmers and other homeowners from losing their properties, with all funds later being replaced. Zach, ashamed by his aggressive behavior, intends to leave town, but the professor urges Mary to go after Zach and bring him back.

== Cast ==
- Dean Jones as Zach Davis
- Joan O'Brien as Mary Judson
- Thomas Mitchell as Mayor Williston
- Walter Abel as Prof. Bowdin
- John Smith a as Bill Reeves
- Burt Douglas as Ray Crowder
- Anne Seymour as Matilda Iler
- Royal Dano as Al Lees
- Ted de Corsia as Sam Lawrence
- Carol Brewster as Mrs. Westphal
- Peter Miller as Carter
- Owen McGiveney as Lloyd
- Nora Marlowe as Mrs. Franklin
- Emerson Treacy as Mr. Zollen
- Phyllis Douglas as Student
- Nick Clooney as Student

== Reception ==
According to MGM records, the movie earned $175,000 in the US and Canada and $150,000 elsewhere, making a loss to the studio of $270,000.

== See also ==
- List of American films of 1958

== Bibliography ==
- Lisanti, Tom. Fantasy Femmes of Sixties Cinema: Interviews with 20 Actresses from Biker, Beach, and Elvis Movies. McFarland, 2015.
