= The Way to Eden =

- Star Trek: The Original Series episode
- Episode no.: Season 3 Episode 20
- Directed by: David Alexander
- Story by: Arthur Heinemann; Michael Richards
- Teleplay by: Arthur Heinemann
- Cinematography by: Al Francis
- Production code: 075
- Original air date: February 21, 1969

Guest appearances
- Skip Homeier – Dr. Sevrin; Charles Napier – Adam; Mary Linda Rapelye – Irina Galliulin; Victor Brandt – Tongo Rad; Deborah Downey – Girl #1; Elizabeth Rogers – Lt. Palmer; Phyllis Douglas – Girl #2 (Mavig)

Episode chronology
| ← Previous "Requiem for Methuselah" | Next → "The Cloud Minders" |
- Star Trek: The Original Series season 3

"The Way to Eden" is the twentieth episode of the third season of the American science fiction television series Star Trek. The episode was written by Arthur Heinemann, based on a story by Heinemann and D. C. Fontana (using the pen name "Michael Richards"). It was directed by David Alexander, and first broadcast on February 21, 1969.

In the episode, the Enterprise is hijacked by a hippie-like group obsessed with finding a mythical paradise.

== Plot ==
The Federation starship Enterprise is in pursuit of the stolen space cruiser Aurora. In trying to escape, the Aurora overloads its engines and its six passengers are safely beamed aboard the Enterprise just as the Aurora explodes. The group consists of Tongo Rad, son of the Catullan ambassador; Irina Galliulin, an acquaintance of Ensign Chekov; Dr. Sevrin, a noted electronics, acoustics, and communications researcher; Adam, a musician; and two other women.

In responses to Kirk's questions, Dr. Sevrin says their destination is the planet "Eden", which Kirk responds is a myth. The group refuses to co-operate with Kirk, but are impressed by First Officer Spock, who is familiar with their social movement. They are persuaded to go to Sickbay for a medical examination which reveals the party to be in good health, except for Sevrin, who is an asymptomatic carrier of a bacterium. Sevrin is quarantined in the brig. He admits to being aware of this, and believes it to be a product of artificial environments, and tells Spock that the planet Eden will somehow "cleanse" him. Spock attempts to reason with Sevrin and offers to help him find Eden in exchange for his cooperation, but concludes that Sevrin is not sane.

The rest of the group plan to take over the ship. After putting on a music concert including Spock, during which Rad frees Sevrin, the group takes over Auxiliary Control and puts the Enterprise on course for Eden. On arrival at the planet, Sevrin renders all Enterprise crew unconscious with an ultrasonic frequency broadcast through the intercom.

When the crew regain consciousness, they discover that Sevrin and his followers have stolen a shuttlecraft. Kirk deactivates Sevrin's ultrasonic broadcast, and then joins Spock, Chief Medical Officer Dr. McCoy, and Chekov in a search for the group on the planet Eden.

The planet surface is lush and beautiful. However, all the plant life secretes a powerful acid, as Chekov discovers when he touches a flower. The team soon finds Adam, lying dead from tasting a poisonous fruit. Sevrin and the other survivors are then found in the shuttlecraft, all with chemical burns on their feet. Kirk says they must leave, but Sevrin runs from the shuttle, bites into one of the fruits, and dies.

Back on the Enterprise, Irina comes to the bridge to say goodbye to Chekov. Spock advises her and her friends not to give up their search for Eden, as he believes they will either find it, or make it themselves.

== Production ==
Originally, the teleplay was titled "Joanna", and was written by D. C. Fontana, the title character being Dr. McCoy's daughter, who would become romantically involved with Captain Kirk. Later, she was changed to Irina, and Chekov was made her foil. Fontana's script was so heavily rewritten that she asked for her name to be removed from it and replaced with her pseudonym Michael Richards, which she also used for the episode "That Which Survives".

In a 2009 interview with The A.V. Club, Charles Napier recalled auditioning for the part of Adam, which was his first guest starring role. He won the part by jumping onto a table and singing "The House of the Rising Sun" in front of others trying for the part.

== Reception ==
The episode has generally been seen as one of the weakest in the show's history, but its portrayal of characters representing the counterculture of the 1960s has produced widespread comment. Zack Handlen of The A.V. Club gave the episode a 'C−' rating, describing the "space hippie" characters as "too strange and irritating for me to view them sympathetically" and finding fault with the singing, which he described as "the worst kind of padding". Handlen noted as a positive aspect that the episode did allow for the voice of dissent against the "utopia" portrayed by Star Trek. In their compendium of Star Trek reviews, Trek Navigator, Mark A. Altman and Edward Gross both viewed the episode negatively, describing it as having aged badly because of the hippie characters and also noting the poor musical parts of the episode. Grace Lee Whitney, who had played Janice Rand in early episodes of the show, described the episode as a "clinker" on a par with another third season episode "Spock's Brain"; and actor James Doohan, who portrayed Chief Engineer Montgomery Scott, often called it "a nothing episode".

Several writers have discussed the way the episode represents the "space hippies". Aniko Bodroghkozy touched on the topic in her book Groove Tube: Sixties Television and the Youth Rebellion. In it, Bodroghkozy noted a negative and positive portrayal; on one hand Sevrin's followers have been duped and must return to "civilization, apparently contrite, chastened children". On the other, they challenged the supposed benefits and superiority of the Federation, which Bodroghkozy described as a "reading of the counterculture". Timothy Brown argues that Dr. Sevrin is "a clear stand-in for Timothy Leary". Like the acolytes of Leary, Charles Manson, and other counter-culture leaders, Sevrin's followers are "under the spell of charismatic but dangerously unhinged leaders" and "stand for a sixties generation in the thrall of misled idealism".

In 2015, Wired magazine suggested this episode was skippable in their binge-watching guide for the original series.

In 2017, Den of Geek ranked this episode as the number one "best worst" Star Trek episode of the original series, noting its unique entertainment value.

In 2016, TVline ranked this as having one of the top twenty moments of Star Trek, in this case the "space hippie" concert in the Enterprise sick bay.

In 2024 Hollywood.com ranked The Way to Eden at number 75 out of the 79 original series episodes noting "it could be a Muppet Show parody".

== Legacy ==
=== In Star Trek ===
The original script, as written by Fontana, would have provided much background on McCoy, including an unsuccessful marriage which led him into Starfleet (which was later incorporated into the alternate reality of the 2009 film Star Trek). Joanna, McCoy's daughter, was herself mentioned in the animated Star Trek episode "The Survivor". Ms McCoy's backstory was later incorporated into the non-canonical novels Planet of Judgment, Shadows on the Sun, Crisis on Centaurus, and also in the Marvel Comics Star Trek book (1980), married to a Vulcan and still hostile to her father. The McCoy of the alternate reality's backstory—minus Joanna—was also featured in an issue of the continuation comic book based on the alternate realty, Star Trek, published by IDW from 2009 to 2013.

In a 2009 interview with The A.V. Club, Charles Napier recalled being invited to star again on Star Trek, as part of an anniversary celebration. He agreed to appear only if he could play a military character and not "wear that silly shirt again". His next Star Trek character would be General Denning in the Star Trek: Deep Space Nine episode "Little Green Men".

=== In music ===
Deborah Downey, who played the blonde singer "Girl #1", co-wrote the music with Charles Napier (Adam). She released a version of the song "Heading Into Eden" on her album Painting Pictures.

Dialogue from the episode was sampled in the song "Starface" (1992) by American heavy-metal band White Zombie, and in the track "One" (2010) by the Swedish goa / psytrance artist Trinodia. McCoy's line "All this plant life is full of acid, even the grass" provided the title for the debut album by Alice's Orb: Even The Grass Is Full Of Acid (1992). The song "Long time back when the galaxy was new", sung by Adam and Mavig during the concert, has been covered by Gaye Bykers on Acid on their 2001 album Everything's Groovy, under the title "Golf Trek".

== Releases ==
This episode was released in Japan on December 21, 1993 as part of the complete season 3 LaserDisc set, Star Trek: Original Series log.3. A trailer for this and the other episodes was also included, and the episode had English and Japanese audio tracks. The cover script was スター・トレック TVサードシーズン

This episode was included in TOS Season 3 remastered DVD box set, with the remastered version of this episode.
