= Charles Napier (actor) =

American actor (1936–2011)

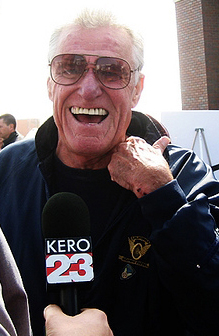
- Napier in April 2008
- Born: Charles Lewis Napier; April 12, 1936; Mt. Union, Kentucky, U.S.
- Died: October 5, 2011 (aged 75); Bakersfield, California, U.S.
- Resting place: Bakersfield National Cemetery
- Education: Western Kentucky University
- Occupation: Actor
- Years active: 1968–2011
- Spouse: Dee Napier (m. 1980)
- Children: 3

Charles Lewis Napier (April 12, 1936 – October 5, 2011) was an American actor who was known for playing supporting and occasional leading roles in television and films. He was frequently cast as police officers, soldiers, or authority figures, many of them villainous or corrupt. After leaving his Kentucky hometown to serve in the Army, he graduated from college and worked as a sports coach and art teacher before settling on acting as a career. His first prominent role in a film was in Cherry, Harry & Raquel! (1969), which was the first of four films he would do with director Russ Meyer. Napier established himself in character roles and worked steadily for the next 35 years. He made numerous collaborations with director Jonathan Demme, including roles in Something Wild (1986), Married to the Mob (1988), The Silence of the Lambs (1991), Philadelphia (1993), Beloved (1998), and The Manchurian Candidate (2004).

Other notable roles include the short-tempered country singer Tucker McElroy in The Blues Brothers (1980), gruff army Commander Gilmour in Austin Powers: International Man of Mystery (1997), General Hawk in Austin Powers: The Spy Who Shagged Me (1999), and bureaucratic CIA officer Marshall Murdock in Rambo: First Blood Part II (1985). On television, he appeared as the space hippie named Adam in the Star Trek episode "The Way to Eden" (S3, E20). He also had numerous voiceover roles in television, most notably Duke Phillips on the prime time animated sitcom The Critic and Zed, the leader of the eponymous group in Men in Black: The Series.

== Early life ==
Charles Lewis Napier was born on April 12, 1936, in Mt. Union, Kentucky near Scottsville. His parents were Sara Lena (née Loafman; 1897–1974) and Linus Pitts Napier (1888–1991). After graduating from high school, he enlisted in the United States Army in 1954, serving with the 511th Infantry Regiment, 11th Airborne Division and rising to the rank of sergeant.

In 1958, after his service, he attended Western Kentucky University in Bowling Green, graduating in 1961 with a major in art and minor in physical education. He wanted to be a basketball coach and his first job was as an assistant coach at his old high school in Allen County, coaching under Allen County legend James Bazzell. Soon after, he gave up coaching, eventually taking jobs with a bridge company and an advertising agency before moving to Clearwater, Florida to teach art at John F. Kennedy Junior High School.

In 1964, Napier returned to Western Kentucky to attend graduate school, where instructor D. Russell Miller encouraged him to pursue acting. Following some success in the local Alley Playhouse, Napier moved back to Florida where he continued to teach as well as act in community theater, eventually moving into Clearwater's Little Theatre as its live-in caretaker. During this time he also pursued painting.

== Career ==
After a spell in New York, Napier moved to California. He acquired an agent and a union card (for a bit part in Mission: Impossible). His film debut came about by accident. A girlfriend took Napier along when she went to audition for Russ Meyer, who cast Napier as the male lead in Cherry, Harry & Raquel!. (He was one of the few actors from Meyer films to go on and have a significant career.) In addition to acting and helping with the cameras when setting up shots, he did stunts, make up and driving on the film. After the low budget Moonfire, he worked as a journalist and photographer for Overdrive magazine for a few years; a strike sent him back to Hollywood in 1975 where, at age 39, he was reduced to living in his car in the parking lot of Meyer's office with no money, work, or agent. He was summoned to Universal Studios to meet Alfred Hitchcock, who had just seen a print of Supervixens, and was given a one-year contract.

Napier became a prolific character actor, appearing regularly in TV series of the time, and a number of pilots. Frequently cast as a heavy, he often portrayed corrupt cops, soldiers, businessmen, and other authority figures. In 1977, he was cast as frontier scout Luther Sprague in the six-episode NBC western television series, The Oregon Trail. He appeared in three episodes of the 1980s hit TV series The A-Team as Col. Briggs. He also co-starred in two The Rockford Files episodes, and played Hammer in the series B.J. and the Bear in the 1970s. Napier as Wolfson Lucas was teamed with Rod Taylor again for the series Outlaws. He is known among Star Trek fans for appearing on both Star Trek: The Original Series episodes "The Way to Eden" as musically inclined space hippie Adam, and the Star Trek: Deep Space Nine episode "Little Green Men" as General Denning. He also appeared in the pilot episode of Knight Rider in 1982.

Citizen's Band director Jonathan Demme was laudatory about Napier's abilities, and went on to cast him in several of his films including The Silence of the Lambs and, in what was Napier's favourite role of his career, a judge in Philadelphia. He played the bureaucratic CIA officer Marshall Murdock in Rambo: First Blood Part II. In the 1980 musical-comedy The Blues Brothers, he portrayed the choleric Tucker McElroy, "lead singer of and driver of the Winnebago" for "The Good Ol' Boys."

Napier was in many advertisements. He performed a great deal of voice-over work, including General Hardcastle in the DC Animated Universe series Superman: The Animated Series and Justice League, Roy in Spirit: Stallion of the Cimarron, Zed in Men in Black: The Series, the Sheriff in Squidbillies, and vocal effects for the Hulk in The Incredible Hulk following the death of Ted Cassidy in 1979. He also provided several guest voices for episodes of The Simpsons.

He had a small role during the sixth season of Curb Your Enthusiasm in 2008 as a barber who assaults and drives Larry David from his shop after David offends him. Napier appeared in the 2009 horror film Murder World alongside Scout Taylor-Compton. His last film role was in the 2009 comedy The Goods: Live Hard, Sell Hard opposite Jeremy Piven and James Brolin.

Prior to his death in October 2011, Napier published a book about his life and experiences in Hollywood, titled Square Jaw and Big Heart.

== Personal life ==
Napier was married twice. His first wife was Delores Wilson. After his divorce, he married Dee Napier. Napier and his wife appeared on Dr. Phil in 2003 to discuss his obsession with being famous. According to the Dr. Phil Show website, "Despite appearing in close to 100 films and countless hit TV shows, Charles Napier says he's depressed he's not a big star. His wife, Dee, says that instead of becoming upset when he gets rejected for a part, Charles should be grateful and proud of his 35-year career. She also thinks it's time he started making the family, not the pursuit of fame, his priority."

Napier and his second wife had two children, son Hunter and daughter Meghan Saralena. Napier also had one son, Charles Lewis "Chuck" Napier Jr., from his previous marriage.

== Death ==
Napier died in Bakersfield, California, on October 5, 2011, after having collapsed the previous day. He was 75 years old. The exact cause of death was not released, but Napier had been treated for deep vein thrombosis in his legs in May 2010.

== Awards and recognitions ==
Napier received a Kentucky colonelcy in 1962.

== Filmography ==
=== Film ===
Year	Title	Role	Notes
1969	The House Near the Prado	Unknown^{1}	
1969	The Hanging of Jake Ellis	Jake Ellis	
1970	Cherry, Harry & Raquel!	Harry Thompson	
1970	Beyond the Valley of the Dolls	Baxter Wolfe	
1970	Moonfire	Robert W. Morgan	
1971	The Seven Minutes	Norman Quandt	
1975	Supervixens	Harry Sledge	
1977	Thunder and Lightning	Jim Bob	
1977	Citizen's Band	Chrome Angel	
1979	Last Embrace	Quittle	
1980	The Blues Brothers	Tucker McElroy	
1980	Melvin and Howard	Ventura	
1982	Wacko	Chief O'Hara	
1983	China Lake	Donnelly	Short film
1984	Swing Shift	Moon Willis	
1984	In Search of a Golden Sky	T. J. Rivers	
1985	Rambo: First Blood Part II	Major Marshall Roger T. Murdock	
1986	Something Wild	Irate chef	
1987	The Night Stalker	Sgt. J.J. Striker	
1987	Body Count	Sheriff Charlie	Released in Italy as Camping del Terrore
1987	Instant Justice	Maj. Davis	
1988	Married to the Mob	Ray	
1988	Deep Space	Det. Ian McLemore	
1989	Hit List	Tom Mitchum	
1990	Future Zone	Mickland	
1990	Miami Blues	Sgt. Bill Henderson	
1990	The Grifters	Gloucester Hebbing	
1990	Maniac Cop 2	Lew Brady	
1990	Ernest Goes to Jail	Warden Carmichael	
1991	The Silence of the Lambs	Lt. Boyle	
1991	Indio 2: The Revolt	IMC President	
1992	Mean Tricks	Brian Hornsby	
1992	Eyes of the Beholder	Det. Wilson	
1992	Center of the Web	Agent Williams	
1993	Return to Frogtown	Capt. Delano	
1993	National Lampoon's Loaded Weapon 1	Interrogator	
1993	Philadelphia	Judge Lucas Garnett	
1993	Body Bags	Baseball Team Manager	
1993	Skeeter	Ernie Buckle	
1994	Savage Land	Cole	
1995	Jury Duty	Jed	
1995	3 Ninjas Knuckle Up	Jack Harding	
1995	Hard Justice	Warden Pike	
1996	Original Gangstas	Mayor	
1996	The Cable Guy	Arresting Officer	
1997	Steel	Col. David	
1997	Austin Powers: International Man of Mystery	Commander Gilmour	
1998	Beloved	Angry Carny	Uncredited
1999	The Big Tease	Sen. Warren Crockett	
1999	Austin Powers: The Spy Who Shagged Me	General Hawk	
2000	Very Mean Men	Detective Bailey	
2000	Nutty Professor II: The Klumps	Four Star General	
2001	Down 'n Dirty	Capt. Jerry Teller	
2002	Spirit: Stallion of the Cimarron	Roy (voice)	
2004	The Manchurian Candidate	General Sloan	
2004	Dinocroc	Sheriff Harper	
2005	Lords of Dogtown	Nudie	
2006	Annapolis	Supt. Carter	
2008	One-Eyed Monster	Montz	
2008	Your Name Here	Chuck Heston	
2009	The Goods: Live Hard, Sell Hard	Dick Lewiston	
2009	Life Blood	Sheriff Tillman	

=== Television ===
Year	Title	Role	Notes
1968	Mannix	Police Officer (uncredited)	Episode: "Night Out of Time"
1968–1971	Mission: Impossible	First Guard, Thug, Roland	3 episodes
1969	Star Trek	Adam	S3:E20, "The Way to Eden"
1975–1978	Starsky & Hutch	John Brown Harris, Sheriff Joe Tyce	2 episodes
1975	Kojak	Marty Vaughan	Episode: "My Brother, My Enemy"
1975	The Streets of San Francisco	Norderman	Episode: "No Place to Hide"
1975	Baretta	Whitey	Episode: "Double Image"
1975	The Rockford Files	Billy Webster, Mitch Donner	2 episodes
1976	Baa Baa Black Sheep	Major Red Buell	2 episodes
1976	Delvecchio	Alt	Episode: "Hot Spell"
1979, 1981	The Incredible Hulk	John Blake, Bert	2 episodes
1979, 1981	B. J. and the Bear	Hammer	6 episodes
1981	Walking Tall	Vernon Larkin	Episode: "The Protectors of the People"
1981	Private Benjamin	General Thrustmore	Episode: "Benjamin to the Rescue" (pilot)
1981–1983	The Dukes of Hazzard	Digger Jackson, Pete	2 episodes
1982	Strike Force	Richard Trallis	Episode: "Deadly Chemicals"
1982	Seven Brides for Seven Brothers	Marshal	Episode: "The Man in the White Hat"
1982	The Blue and the Gray	Maj. Harrison	Miniseries
1982	Knight Rider	Carney	Episode: "Knight of the Phoenix" (pilot); uncredited
1982	Simon & Simon	Gibson	Episode: "Mike & Pat"
1982	CHiPs	Klane	Episode: "Something Special"
1982–1983	Dallas	Carl Daggett	3 episodes
1983	Tales of the Gold Monkey	Tex	Episode: "High Stakes Lady"
1983	Gun Shy	Carlton	Episode: "Pardon Me Boy, Is That The Quake City Choo Choo?"
1983–1984	The A-Team	Burt Cross, Colonel Briggs	2 episodes
1984	Night Court	Mitch Bowers	Episode: "Hi Honey, I'm Home"
1984	Whiz Kids	Douglas Blackthorne	Episode: "May I Take Your Order Please?"
1985	Street Hawk	John Slade	Episode: "Hot Target"
1986, 1995	Murder, She Wrote	Hank Sutter, Denver Martin	2 episodes
1986	Outlaws	Wolfson Lucas	Contract Role
1988	The Incredible Hulk Returns	Mike Fouche	Post-series film
1988	War and Remembrance	Lt. Gen. Walter Bedell Smith	Miniseries based on the novel of the same name
1989	Paradise	Guest	Episode: "A Gather Of Guns"
1991	L.A. Law	Detective John Foley	Episode: "The Beverly Hills Hangers"
1992	The Golden Palace	Mr. Smith #1	Episode: "Camp Town Races Aren't Nearly As Much Fun As They Used To Be"
1993	Renegade	Brackett, Sgt. Douglas Raines	3 episodes
1994–1995	The Critic	Duke Phillips (voice)	23 episodes
1994	Coach	Buzz Durkin	Episode: "Head Like a Wheel"
1995	Lois and Clark: The New Adventures of Superman	Sailin' Whalen	Episode: "Target: Jimmy Olsen!"
1995	Star Trek: Deep Space Nine	General Denning	Episode: "Little Green Men"
1996	Pacific Blue	Tyrone Justice	Episode: "Genuine Heroes"
1996	The Real Adventures of Jonny Quest	Hinkle (voice)	Episode: "Without A Trace"
1997–1998	Jumanji	Captain Ishmael Squint (voice)	3 episodes
1997–2000	Superman: The Animated Series	General Hardcastle (voice)	3 episodes
1997	George & Leo	Dutch	Episode: "The Housekeeper"
1997–2001	Men in Black: The Series	Agent Zed (voice)	Main cast
1998	Party of Five	Video Guy	Episode: "Here and Now"
1998	Second Chances	Craig Hardy	Miniseries
1998	Rugrats	Captain (voice)	Episode: "Submarine"
1999	Walker, Texas Ranger	Warden	Episode: "Fight or Die"
1999	Recess	Adult Hector (voice)	Episode: "Dodgeball City"
1999	The Sylvester & Tweety Mysteries	Colonel Ambore (voice)	Episode: "Bayou on the Half Shell"
2000	God, the Devil and Bob	Reverend Nat Potterson (voice)	4 episodes
2000	Roswell	Hal Carver	Episode: "Summer of '47"
2000	Buzz Lightyear of Star Command	Cooley (voice)	Episode: "Haunted Moon"
2001	Diagnosis Murder	Johnny McNamara	Episode: "Sins of the Father"
2001	The Practice	Judge Abraham Betts	2 episodes
2001	The Legend of Tarzan	Ian McTeague (voice)	Episode: "Tarzan and the Poisoned River"
2001–2005	The Simpsons	Warden, Officer Krackney, Grant Conner (voice)	4 episodes
2002	Son of the Beach	Charles Foster Brooks	Episode: "Three Days of the Condom"
2003	The Mummy	Jack O'Connell	Episode: "Like Father Like Son"
2004	Justice League Unlimited	General Hardcastle (voice)	Episode: "Fearful Symmetry"
2005	The 4400	Reverend Josiah	Episode: "Wake Up Call"
2005	The Batman	Killgore Steed (voice)	Episode: "The Laughing Cats"
2005	CSI: Crime Scene Investigation	Warren Matthews	Episode: "Still Life"
2005	Fielder's Choice	Cowboy Bob	Television film
2005–2006	Squidbillies	The Sheriff (voice)	Recurring role
2006	Monk	Sheriff Bates	Episode: "Mr. Monk Bumps His Head"
2007	Ned's Declassified School Survival Guide	Sergeant Guard	Episode: "Field Trips, Permission Slips, Signs and Weasels"
2007	Curb Your Enthusiasm	Bert's Dad	Episode: "The Lefty Call"
2008	Cold Case	Hal Chaney	Episode: "Shore Leave"
2011	Archer	Dr. Spelts (voice)	Episode: "Stage Two"

== Notes ==
1. Lead actor Charles Napier may have been billed under another name.
