= Nick Dimitri =

American actor (1932–2021)

- Born: December 27, 1932
- Died: October 20, 2021 (aged 88)
- Occupations: Film and television actor, stuntman
- Years active: 1959–1997
- Spouse: Christina Cummings

Nick Dimitri (born Nicholas Siggelakis) (December 27, 1932 – October 20, 2021) was an American stuntman and actor best known as Charles Bronson's character's opponent in the climax of Hard Times (1975).

In addition to fisticuffs, his specialty was dying violently on screen. He was a regular stuntman on the World War II TV series The Rat Patrol and a double for action actors Sean Connery and William Smith. He helped set up the fights in Darker than Amber and Any Which Way You Can.

Dimitri also played Angie Dickinson's character's undead husband in the 1973 cult TV movie The Norliss Tapes. He later became a fixture in many of Arnold Schwarzenegger's films, stood up to Steven Seagal's character in Out for Justice, and doubled for the one-armed man in the big screen version of The Fugitive (1993).

Dimitri was married to actress Christina Cummings from 1982 until his death. He died on October 20, 2021, at the age of 88.

== Partial filmography ==
- 1959 Li'l Abner as Muscleman (uncredited)
- 1962 Kid Galahad as Boxer (uncredited)
- 1963 Island of Love as Hood (uncredited)
- 1963 Palm Springs Weekend as Muscleman (uncredited)
- 1963 A Chance to Live
- 1964 The Train as German Soldier (uncredited)
- 1965 Harlow as Second Fighter
- 1966 The Last Moment
- 1966 Murderers' Row as Guard (uncredited)
- 1967 The Reluctant Astronaut as Astronaut (uncredited)
- 1967 In Cold Blood as Las Vegas Cop (uncredited)
- 1967 The Ambushers as Parking Lot Thug (uncredited)
- 1970 The Molly Maguires as Policeman (uncredited)
- 1973 Sweet Jesus, Preacherman as Liquor Store Rowdy
- 1973 The Student Teachers as Pinocchio
- 1973 The Norliss Tapes as James Cort
- 1973 Cleopatra Jones as Cop In Bust (uncredited)
- 1973 The Don Is Dead as Hijacker (uncredited)
- 1973 That Man Bolt as Syndicate Hood (uncredited)
- 1974 Black Samson as Milo
- 1975 Hard Times as Street
- 1975 Adiós Amigo
- 1976 Death Journey as Thug #7
- 1976 Futureworld as Robot Boxer (uncredited)
- 1976 No Way Back as Goon #1
- 1976 Scorchy as Steve
- 1977 The World's Greatest Lover as Boyfriend On Train
- 1978 The Driver as Blue Mask
- 1980 The Nude Bomb as KAOS #1
- 1981 Bustin' Loose as Frank Munjak
- 1982 My Favorite Year as Thug #4
- 1982 They Call Me Bruce? as Macho Guy #1
- 1982 48 Hrs. as Torchy's Patron #3
- 1983 Sudden Impact as Assassin #2
- 1984 Magnum PI as Archie
- 1984 City Heat as Garage Soldier #3
- 1985 Commando as Guerrilla Guarding Plane (uncredited)
- 1986 The Longshot as Track Cop
- 1986 Foxtrap as Hank
- 1989 Turner & Hooch as Casey
- 1989 Kill Me Again as Marty
- 1991 Out for Justice as The Bartender
- 1991 Toy Soldiers as Border Patrol Officer #2
- 1991 Stone Cold as Trucker #1
- 1991 Mobsters as Bodyguard #2
- 1993 Fist of Honor as Nick Glowacki
- 1993 Last Action Hero as Funeral Doctor
- 1996 Back to Back as Vince
- 1997 Flipping as Tommy "Fat Man" Barnett
