= Frank Campanella =

American actor (1919–2006)

- Frank Campanella in Mission: Impossible (1968)
- Born: March 12, 1919; New York City, New York, U.S.
- Died: December 30, 2006 (aged 87); Los Angeles, California, U.S.
- Education: Manhattan College
- Occupation: Actor
- Years active: 1947–2006
- Relatives: Joseph Campanella (brother)

Frank Campanella (March 12, 1919 – December 30, 2006) was an American actor. He appeared in numerous television series, as well as a few films and Broadway productions.

== Early life and career ==
Campanella was born in New York City, the son of Philip and Mary O. Campanella, both born in Sicily. The family lived in the Washington Heights section of upper Manhattan. He was the older brother of actor Joseph Campanella, and Philip Campanella (who became a union plumber) and spoke mostly Italian growing up; this proved useful during World War II, when he worked as a civilian translator for the U.S. government. Campanella graduated from Manhattan College in 1940, where he studied drama.

Campanella's first film role was as Mook, the Moon-Man in the 1949 science-fiction series Captain Video and His Video Rangers and went on to appear in more than 100 film and television episodes, usually playing the "tough guy". Campanella appeared as a bartender in Mel Brooks' The Producers (1967), starring Zero Mostel and Gene Wilder, and his many film credits included roles in What's So Bad About Feeling Good? (1968); The Gang That Couldn't Shoot Straight (1971); The Stone Killer (1973); Capone (1975, as Big Jim Colosimo); Chesty Anderson, USN (1976); Heaven Can Wait (1978); The North Avenue Irregulars (1979); High Noon, Part II: The Return of Will Kane (1980); Death Wish II (1982); Young Doctors in Love (1982); The Flamingo Kid (1984); Nothing in Common (1986); Overboard (1987); Beaches (1988); Blood Red (1989); Pretty Woman (1990) and Dick Tracy (1990). He helped Robert De Niro learn Sicilian for his role as young Vito Corleone in Francis Ford Coppola's The Godfather: Part II (1974).

Campanella's early television roles included three appearances as different police lieutenants on the syndicated crime drama, Decoy, starring Beverly Garland as the first female police lead in a television series. In one of the Decoy episodes, he appeared with his brother Joseph. Over his career, he appeared, often in police roles, in such well-known series as Ironside; Mannix; The Rockford Files; Quincy, M.E.; Chico and the Man; All in the Family; Mission: Impossible; Maude; Rhoda; and The Love Boat. In 1969, Campanella appeared as Sheriff Quartermine on the TV Series The Virginian in the episode titled "Journey to Scathelock".

Campanella's Broadway credits include Guys and Dolls (1965), Nobody Loves an Albatross (1963), Nowhere to Go But Up (1962), The Deadly Game (1960), Sixth Finger in a Five Finger Glove (1956), Remains to Be Seen (1951), Stalag 17 (1951), Volpone (1948), and Galileo (1947).

== Death ==
Campanella died on December 30, 2006, at his home in Los Angeles. He was 87.

== Selected filmography ==
- 1956 Somebody Up There Likes Me as Detective (uncredited)
- 1957 Four Boys and a Gun as (uncredited)
- 1958 Stage Struck as Victor
- 1961 Parrish as Foreman (uncredited)
- 1962 A View from the Bridge as Longshoreman
- 1965 Who Killed Teddy Bear? as Police Captain
- 1966 Blindfold as Police Officer (uncredited)
- 1966 Seconds as Man In Station
- 1967 The Producers as The Bartender
- 1968 What's So Bad About Feeling Good? as Captain Wallace
- 1969 Out of It as The Coach
- 1971 The Mephisto Waltz as Detective Investigating Bill's Death (uncredited)
- 1971 The Gang That Couldn't Shoot Straight as Water Buffalo
- 1973 The Stone Killer as Calabriese
- 1975 Capone as Vincenzo "Big Jim" Colosimo
- 1976 Chesty Anderson, USN as The Baron
- 1977 High Anxiety as The Bartender
- 1978 Heaven Can Wait as Conway
- 1979 The North Avenue Irregulars as Max Roca
- 1980 High Noon, Part II: The Return of Will Kane as Dr. Losey
- 1982 Death Wish II as Judge Neil A. Lake
- 1982 Young Doctors in Love as The Flashback – Young Simon's Grandfather
- 1984 The Flamingo Kid as Colonel Cal Eastland
- 1986 Free Ride as Old Man Garbagio
- 1986 Nothing in Common as Remo
- 1987 Overboard as Captain Karl
- 1988 Beaches as Doorman
- 1989 Blood Red as Dr. Scola
- 1990 Pretty Woman as Pops
- 1990 Dick Tracy as Judge Harper
- 1991 Frankie and Johnny as Retired Customer
- 1994 Exit to Eden as Wheelchair Walker
- 1994 Love Affair as Elevator Operator
- 1999 The Other Sister as William, Guest At Wedding
- 2004 Raising Helen as Mourner
- 2006 Seven Days of Grace as Papa (final film role)
