= Supervixens =

1975 film by Russ Meyer

- Theatrical release poster
- Directed by: Russ Meyer
- Written by: Russ Meyer
- Produced by: Russ Meyer
- Starring: Shari Eubank; Charles Napier; Uschi Digard; Charles Pitt; Haji; Henry Rowland; Christy Hartburg; Sharon Kelly; John LaZar; Stuart Lancaster "Big Jack" Provan; Deborah McGuire; Glenn Dixon; Garth Pillsbury; John Lawrence; Fred Owens
- Cinematography: Russ Meyer
- Edited by: Russ Meyer
- Music by: William Loose
- Production company: September 19
- Distributed by: RM Films International
- Release date: April 2, 1975 (Dallas)
- Running time: 106 minutes
- Country: United States
- Language: English
- Budget: $100,000
- Box office: $17 million

Supervixens is a 1975 American film directed by American filmmaker Russ Meyer. The cast features Meyer regulars Charles Napier, Uschi Digard, and Haji. The film also features Shari Eubank (in a dual role) in one of her only two film roles and Christy Hartburg in her only film role.

== Plot ==
Gas station attendant Clint Ramsey, who works at Martin Bormann's Super Service in the desert, finds himself too irresistible to a series of girls, all of whom have the word "Super" in their given names. In the beginning, he is married to the hypersexual, demanding, and jealous SuperAngel, who constantly harasses him at work. She orders him home at once when she calls Clint and overhears a female customer, SuperLorna, hitting on him at work. Clint finds SuperAngel's constant accusations and arguing a turn-off and, back at home, they fight after he rejects her aggressive advances. A neighbor calls the police as Clint leaves for a local bar, where the bartender is the very scantily clad SuperHaji.

Meanwhile, SuperAngel seduces Harry Sledge, the cop who responded to the police call. He is unable to perform. She repeatedly taunts and insults him over this, which finally results in him killing her by stomping her brutally in a bathtub, then throwing a radio in the water which was plugged into the wall socket. Sledge burns down the house, then tries to pin the murder on Clint. Clint claims being in the pub all night, but SuperHaji has her revenge on him (for insulting her breast size earlier) by refusing to confirm his alibi. Clint is then forced to flee.

In his rush to escape, Clint hitchhikes a ride from a boy and his girlfriend SuperCherry. During the drive, SuperCherry comes on to him and puts his hand over her breast, but then pulls it back. She then tries to give him a handjob over his pants, but he continues to resist her advances. The driver takes offense to Clint rejecting his girlfriend, but she says he probably just wants a closer contact. She again attempts and fails to seduce him and he asks the driver to let him get out. The driver follows him out and beats and robs him. Clint is found by an old farmer who takes him to his farm to heal from his injuries and Clint agrees to work for the farmer for a week to repay him.

The farmer has a younger Austrian mail-order bride, SuperSoul, who is hypersexual. After energetically satisfying her husband, she comes knocking on Clint's door at night. She immediately pushes him into his bed where she proceeds to mount and rape him, until he manages to overpower her. However, she does the same the following day and this time overpowering him after jumping him from behind in the barn. Looking for SuperSoul, the farmer finds them in the barn, then chases Clint away and punches SuperSoul.

Fleeing from the farm, Clint meets a motel owner and his deaf daughter, SuperEula, who convinces him to take a ride with her in her dune buggy to have sex in the desert. They are caught by her father and chased out of town.

Clint eventually meets up with SuperVixen (also played by Shari Eubank) at Supervixen's Oasis, a roadside diner. SuperVixen is (inexplicably) a friendly and giving reincarnation of SuperAngel, whose ghost now appears nude between scenes to comment on the plot from atop a bedspring balanced on a mesa. Clint and SuperVixen fall in love and are inseparable, although their common nemesis, Harry Sledge, arrives on the scene and plots ending the lives of the now happy couple.

== Cast ==
- Charles Pitts as Clint Ramsey
- Shari Eubank as SuperAngel / SuperVixen
- Charles Napier as Harry Sledge
- Uschi Digard as SuperSoul / Telephone Operator
- Henry Rowland as Martin Bormann
- Christy Hartburg as SuperLorna
- Colleen Brennan as SuperCherry (as Sharon Kelly)
- John LaZar as Cal MacKinney (as John La Zar)
- Stuart Lancaster as Lute
- Deborah McGuire as SuperEula
- Glenn Dixon as Luther
- Haji as SuperHaji
- "Big Jack" Provan as Sheriff
- Garth Pillsbury as Fisherman
- John Lawrence as Dr. Scholl
- Ron Sheridan as Policeman
- Fred Owens as Rufus (as F. Rufus Owens)

== Production ==
=== Development ===
Meyer's previous two films had failed at the box office - The Seven Minutes was a straight drama about censorship, done for 20th Century Fox, and Black Snake was a blaxploitation film. He originally intended to follow this with Foxy (starring his then-wife Edy Williams) but the marriage ended and "I just couldn't picture myself making twenty films starring Edy Williams". He was also worried about the Supreme Court decision against pornography.

"Those years were very confusing to me," said Meyer. "But instead of rushing off and throwing myself out the window, I was able to psychoanalyze myself and discern what was best for me. I looked myself square in the face and realized I couldn't do everything."

Meyer decided to return to the parody sex comedies which had made his reputation so he made what he described as a "sort of sequel" to his 1968 hit Vixen!.

"I'm back to big bosoms, square jaws, lotsa action and the most sensational sex you ever saw," he said. "I'm back to what I do best - erotic, comedic sex, sex, sex - and I'll never stray again."

"I don't want to do too much yakking," he said. "If there was too much plot, too much dialogue, the story would get in the way of the action. I want a film like an Al Capp cartoon where you know right off who's good and who's bad."

"I'm gonna really deliver on this film." Censors were cracking down on sexually explicit films at the time but Meyer said, "I'll do the things I've always done. I'll do everything I can to outwit them. I'll supersaturate it with outrageous bosoms." I used John LaZar, who was Superwoman in Beyond the Valley of the Dolls. He plays Cal McKinney, and he and Supercherry are a couple of muggers and they mug Clint. Then I had O’Luke, who was in Mudhoney, Stu Lancaster, married to Uschi Digard, who was an Austrian wife and giant — well, they’re all giant-busted women in the picture, which I think makes the send-up. Every chick he meets is like — “Oh Christ, here we go again!” So she’s Supersoul and she speaks essentially in German, and she’s probably the most aggressive woman in the picture, of the seven. She's just totally — she does two things: she's either milking the cow with a giant udder, or she’s rapaciously taking her old man, out in the fields, wherever the case may be. And then there's a sequence where she attacks, rapes, literally consumes a young man in a manger, screaming, shouting German, describing explicitly what she’s doing and how it feels. Then we have a black girl who’s built like the rest, and she’s dumb, she can’t speak, she uses sign language. But she has a white father, and we never explain that. She’s Supereula.

"There's a new chick every ten minutes," said Meyer. "And each chick is more outrageously constructed than the next."

At one stage Meyer was reportedly making the film for American International Pictures.

Meyer said he planned to shoot the film in R-rated and X-rated versions. He would release the R version, then later release a more explicit X-rated version. However the film would not include hard core sex. "I don't criticise hard core", he said. "I just don't dig it."

=== Scripting ===
Meyer said the film "was a little bit autobiographical" but also which "borrowed liberally from a number of people I knew".

He said he was also influenced by the stories of Horatio Alger. "They were always about a young man who was totally good, and he would always set out to gain his fortune and he would always come up against terrible people," said Meyer. "They did everything they could to do him in, but he fought fair, you know, and he always survived and succeeded in the end. So, that's just one facet of the thing."

Meyer flew to the Mauna Kea Hotel in Hawaii in September 1973 and wrote the script. It was the first screenplay he wrote entirely by himself and he did the first draft in eight days. Meyer says he rewrote it nine times, with input of the actors. "I think actors contribute to the comfort of words because it's one thing to sit in a little green room somewhere and write dialogue, but when you hear actors speaking it, it doesn't necessarily flow as well as it might," said Meyer.

The two main female characters in the film were Superangel and Supervixen. "Superangel, she's totally bad but beautiful," said Meyer. "Supervixen, she's totally good. They're bookends. I like bookend constructions."

"I set out to make a picture that I thought might compete favorably with today's market in keeping with what I had done heretofore," he added. "And you know, crowded on one side by hardcore films and on the other side by major product that is very explicit. Heretofore, always, I had one super female in the film. This time, I said I was going to have seven. And we'd bring one in every reel, like a new linebacker. And I think it works, it really works. You don't have time to grow tired of the looks or the actions of one girl, for example."

Meyer used names of characters from his previous films, "except the girls are all called “Super” and they play it straight."

Meyer said Supervixen wearing white was a tribute to The Postman Always Rings Twice. "She's good, pure." He wanted to hint that Superangel maybe did not die in the bathtub but wound up reincarnated:

Guiding the destinies of three people: terrible, nasty, dirty, nogood Harry Sledge, policeman, former green beret, redneck, opinionated, a bum lay, sexually sick, very physical, very muscular; and Clint, clean, slim, obviously a stud but not in a pushy, forward kind of way, totally good; and Supervixen, voluptuous, pure, good, totally giving, self-sacrificing.

=== Casting ===
The cast included Charles Napier, who had appeared in a number of Meyer films but quit acting to become a journalist for a trucking magazine. Meyer brought him out of retirement to do the film.

There were a number of other actors who had appeared in earlier Meyer films like John LaZar, O’Luke, Stu Lancaster, and Uschi Digard.

=== Shooting ===
In March 1974, scenes were shot at the Crest Motel and the Sultan's Den in Blythe, California, before the crew finished filming in Quartzsite, Arizona. A dune buggy scene was filmed in the Quartzsite area the past month.

The film featured a murder scene which was the most violent yet depicted in a Meyer film. "My films have to please me, to entertain me, and I really dig violence," said Meyer. "I think it's very entertaining. Of course, I like to involve sex with it - sex with gusto - that's my style."

The official budget was $400,000 but Meyer said he deliberately inflated this figure.

== Reception ==
=== Box office ===
The film was Meyer's biggest commercial success since Beyond the Valley of the Dolls, making $8.2 million during its initial theatrical run. "It's wonderful to come back and find that my kind of voluptuous, superbosumy LA Rams-Chicago Bears scrimmage kind of put on sex is perfectly acceptable to the mainstream," he said. "People want to be amused, entertained and that's what I'm giving 'em."

Meyer called it "a very good film" although "people kept asking, "Why did you have to have that bathtub murder," when really the success of the film was the bathtub scene, since there was so little sex in the picture. After a tour of Ivy League colleges and after showing it in Europe, it was clear to me that in the two weeks before its national release I had to interject some more sex. And I did, fortunately. Otherwise I don't think it would have performed as well as it did. But it wouldn't have worked as an R. The audience smells that. You lift a whole sequence out and they won't come."

Meyer also said later the thought "the film wouldn't have had the success it had" without Napier "in spite of the big boobs and seven girls. Napier, I think, has a quality that few actors possess: Wallace Beery, Borgnine, Alan Hale. There can be just a thin edge separating evil and humor and they work both sides of that line."

=== Censored versions ===
The British version of the film cut a moment where Napier stomped on a woman after killing her in a bath.

The R-rated version removed the bathtub murder. "I wouldn't do it again," said Meyer. After the film came out Meyer said "I plan to stick to what I know works and make one X picture after the next and be even more outrageous with sex and keep pushing the boundaries further and further."

=== Critical reception ===
Vincent Canby of The New York Times wrote that the film "looks sort of ritualistic, sort of perfunctory, made up of actions whose original meaning and purpose have been forgotten ... 'Supervixens' is a curio for film buffs." Gene Siskel of the Chicago Tribune gave the film one star out of four and wrote that "Meyer has lost the sense of humor that occasionally made his films enjoyable. The humor has been replaced with repulsive amounts of violence." Kevin Thomas of the Los Angeles Times said Meyer explored "as never before to such an extent the dark underside of his erotic myths. It's 'Supervixens,' not The Day of the Locust, that's genuinely apocalyptic."

Edy Williams, Meyer's ex-wife, later sued unsuccessfully for a portion of the film's profits.

On the review aggregator website Rotten Tomatoes, 49% of 39 critics' reviews are positive. The website's consensus reads: "A jarring blend of surrealist pulp and sadistic farce, Supervixens finds Russ Meyer's visual flair buried under waves of cartoonish, overwrought brutality."

== Cultural references ==
- Meyer makes the cartoonish nature of the film explicit towards the end, when Harry's impending death is preceded by the "Beep-beep!" sound of the Roadrunner, which always introduces imminent disaster for Wile E. Coyote in the Wile E. Coyote and Road Runner cartoon series. The antagonist breaks the fourth wall between the fictional world and the audience with a facial gesture showing he is resigned to his fate.
- As a humorous sidenote, in the end credits of the film the names of all participants have been changed either partially (Uschi Bristol instead of Digard) or completely (Brown Pants, C. Unt). Shari Eubank is credited as Shari Sheridan.
- As a combat photographer in World War II, Russ Meyer made many friends and acquaintances in Europe. Meyer used running jokes and recurring themes in many of his films which were unique to the veteran's sense of humor. In Supervixens, these include the use of German marching tunes and Nazi references. Actor Henry Rowland appears as Martin Bormann, who was Adolf Hitler's personal secretary, rumored to have escaped Allied justice for decades and the subject of many "sightings". The Bormann character refers to SuperAngel as the Führer.
- Bruce Springsteen mentions the film in the chorus of his song "Pilgrim in the Temple of Love".
- The band Garbage included a song called "Supervixen" on their self-titled debut album.

== See also ==
- List of American films of 1975
