= Christy Hartburg =

American actress and model (1947–2025)

- Born: April 7, 1947
- Died: February 24, 2025 (aged 77)
- Other name: Christina Cummings
- Occupation: Actress
- Years active: 1975–2000
- Spouse: Nick Dimitri

Christy Hartburg (April 7, 1947 – February 24, 2025) was an American actress and model who appeared in Russ Meyer's Supervixens (1975). She was also the actress who adorned the famous poster for that film. Hartburg performed on several Bob Hope tours to Vietnam in the late 1960s and early 1970s.

Hartburg also performed under the alias Christina Cummings in several films and television shows. She died on February 24, 2025, at the age of 77.
