= Shari Eubank =

American actress (born 1947)

- Born: Shari Eubank; June 12, 1947 (age 78); Albuquerque, New Mexico, U.S.
- Occupation: Actress
- Years active: 1975–1976
- Known for: Supervixens

Shari Eubank (born June 12, 1947) is a retired American actress, best known for her starring role in the Russ Meyer film Supervixens.

== Biography ==
Eubank was born in Albuquerque, New Mexico, on June 12, 1947. The following year, her family moved east to Farmer City, Illinois. Eubank attended Farmer City High School, where she was a cheerleader and homecoming queen. After graduating from high school in 1965, Eubank studied at Illinois Wesleyan University and became a member of the Masquers—a student drama organization. Graduate work followed, before she began a modeling and acting career that included two feature films.

Meyer, who said "she had real guts", said she inherited a great deal of money from her family.

== Filmography ==
- Supervixens (1975), SuperAngel/SuperVixen
- Chesty Anderson, USN (1976), Chesty Anderson
