= Thomas Jefferson (musician) =

American jazz musician

- Born: June 20, 1920; Chicago, Illinois, U.S.
- Died: December 13, 1986 (aged 66) New Orleans, Louisiana, U.S.
- Genres: Jazz, Dixieland jazz
- Instruments: Trumpet

Thomas Jefferson (June 20, 1920 – December 13, 1986) was an American Dixieland jazz trumpeter, strongly influenced by Louis Armstrong.

== Early life ==
Jefferson was born in Chicago, Illinois in June 1920. He played drums and French horn while young before switching to trumpet. Jefferson professional career began when he was 14, and played with Billie and De De Pierce.

== Career ==
Jefferson played with Papa Celestin's orchestra in 1936, as well as with New Orleans jazz musicians such as Sidney Desvigne and Armand "Jump" Jackson. In the 1950s, he worked with Johnny St. Cyr, Santo Pecora, and George Lewis. In 1966, Andrew Morgan recruited Jefferson to play lead trumpet for the Young Tuxedo Brass Band. Subsequently, Jefferson led a jazz band which performed at the New Orleans jazz club Maison Bourbon.

Jefferson recorded sparingly as a leader; sessions include dates for Southland Records in the 1960s and Maison Bourbon Records in the 1970s. Jazz critic Scott Yanow called Jefferson "one of the finest trumpeters in New Orleans during the 1950s and 1960s." Jefferson had a cameo as a jazz musician in the film Hard Times (1975).

== Death ==
Jefferson died in New Orleans, Louisiana, in December 1986.

== Discography ==
=== As leader ===
- New Orleans at Midnight (Southland Records, LP-229)
  - Reissued on GHB Records as GHB-129
- New Orleans Creole Jazz Band Featuring Thomas Jefferson (Southland Records, LP-234)
- Dreaming Down the River to New Orleans (Southland Records, LP-238)
- Sleepy Time Down South (Maison Bourbon Records #1)
- Hello Dolly (Maison Bourbon Records #9)
- Thomas Jefferson From New Orleans (Storyville Records, SLP 131)
  - Includes material originally recorded for Southland Records, including several titles from Southland LP-229.

=== As sideman ===
- Paul Barbarin, Paul Barbarin's Bourbon Street Beat (Southland Records, LP-237)
- Jim Robinson, Living New Orleans Jazz-1976 (Smoky Mary Phonograph Company, SM 1976 J)
  - Appeared on 5 of 10 tracks.
- Johnny St. Cyr, Johnny St. Cyr And His Hot Five / Paul Barbarin And His Jazz Band (Southland Records, LP-212)
  - Appeared on tracks with Johnny St. Cyr only.
