= Uschi Digard =

Swiss model and pornographic actress

- Digard in a promotional still for Supervixens (1975)
- Other names: Jobi Winston, many others
- Occupations: Softcore pornographic actress; pin-up model
- Years active: 1968–1982
- Height: 5 ft 7 in (1.70 m)

Uschi Digard is the stage name of a softcore pornographic actress and pin-up model active between 1968 and 1982. Born in Europe, she was said to be aged thirty-two in 1977 and sixty in 2006, but her date of birth is not known. She emigrated to the United States in 1968 and settled in California. She is remembered particularly for her work with Russ Meyer.

== Early life ==
The two main sources for Digard's early life are an interview she gave to Dian Hanson in 2006 for The Big Book of Breasts and an interview she gave to The Rialto Report in 2013. Several details in these two interviews differ.

| | The Big Book of Breasts | The Rialto Report |
|---|---|---|
| Date of birth | aged 60, so born around 1945–1946 | the oft-cited birthdate of 15 August 1948 is "totally wrong" |
| Birthplace | Saltsjö-Duvnäs near Stockholm, Sweden | Romandy, Switzerland |
| Family ancestry | Swedish-Swiss | Swiss Romand |
| Upbringing | in Sweden | in Switzerland |

Both sources agree that Digard had a strict education in a convent boarding school, which felt to her like a "cage" and a "prison". Among other things, she had her favoured left hand strapped to her body to make her use her right hand, including for writing. That said, the school also nurtured her precocious love of reading and languages. She appears to have completed her education with a year at a French school and a year at an Italian school. She says in the 2006 interview that she went to Paris to "learn French", but given that she says in the 2013 interview that her family is Swiss Romand, this should not be taken to mean learning from scratch.

Beyond school, she indulged her passion for skiing, swimming, outdoor life and nudism, which would later be integral to her persona as a model and actress.

== Linguist ==
Digard is proficient in German, French and Italian (the national languages of Switzerland), Swedish, Spanish, and English. She spent much of her young adulthood travelling for adventure and to improve her language skills: in England, France, Israel, Italy, Mexico, Morocco, Spain, Sweden, the Channel Islands, and the Canary Islands, where she met her lifelong husband, a musician known as "Ron".

She began her working life in jobs that made use of her gifts as a linguist: at London's Regent Palace Hotel; in the jewellery trade in the Canary Islands, Sweden and Switzerland; and at the Olympic Games in Mexico City. She continued to sideline as an interpreter and translator even after achieving celebrity in the entertainment industry, including for a Californian aircraft manufacturer.

== Acting and modelling ==
=== Sweden ===
Digard was long believed to be Swedish and the Swedish Film Institute tentatively accepts this, while acknowledging that there are other possibilities. The 2013 interview, however, suggests that her connection with the country is slight. She says she lived there "for three years" in the sixties when her husband had a show on Swedish television, but her chronology implies a shorter period, approximately summer 1967 to autumn 1968. There is no evidence that she did any modelling or pornographic work during her time there.

=== United States ===
Digard has said that she moved to the U.S. in 1967 (in the 2006 interview) or in 1968 (in the 2013 interview). The 1968 date better fits the detailed chronology she provides in her conversation with The Rialto Report.

Once settled, she began working as a pin-up model. She became one of the best known big-bust models in the late 1960s and early 1970s. Magazines in which she appeared frequently include Knight, Cinema X, Latent Image, and Gent. Digard also did photo shoots under the name of Astrid Lillimore.

At the same time, she set about breaking into the movies. She started at the bottom as a bit player and supporting actress in sexploitation films, with her uncredited turn as a hitch-hiker in Gary Graver's The Kill (1968) possibly her first screen appearance. She gradually worked up to more prominent roles, as in Raquel's Motel (a.k.a. Uschi's Hollywood Adventure, 1970). Both of these films were so low-budget they were shot without sound and then dubbed with a narrative voice-over. Yet even in Z movies, Digard developed a reputation for her work ethic and commitment to making projects succeed — which extended to stepping in as a stunt double for more trepidatious colleagues if necessary. She had "the dedication of a Watusi gun-bearer", according to Russ Meyer.

Meyer cast Digard in Cherry, Harry & Raquel! (1970) to perform an interpretive dance scene symbolizing the death of the protagonist. She went on to appear in two more of Meyer's films in the 1970s: Supervixens (1975) and Beneath the Valley of the Ultra-Vixens (1979). She was also a co-producer on Beneath the Valley of the Ultra-Vixens, as she had been earlier on the director's Up! (1976). She provided the voice-over narration for Tundi Horvath's character in Meyer's last film, Pandora Peaks (2000). She also had starring roles in Edward L. Montoro's Getting Into Heaven (1970) and Ed Wood's The Only House in Town (1971).

Among the dozens of features in which Digard did cameos and played minor roles were Superchick (1973) starring Joyce Jillson, as the character Mayday; Ilsa, She Wolf of the SS (1975), as a prisoner; Sam Peckinpah's The Killer Elite (1975), as a girl at a party; Richard Franklin's Fantasm (1976), as Super Girl; Chesty Anderson, US Navy (1976), as the Baron's girlfriend; Female Chauvinists (1976), as a character called Pussy; and John Landis's The Kentucky Fried Movie (1977), as the woman showering in the segment "Catholic High School Girls in Trouble".

Digard appeared in a small number of X-rated movies, such as I Want You! (1970), but her own sex scenes in these films were faked. Digard said she "never once" did hardcore: "I made my reputation by the tease. Everything was simulated." Russ Meyer said Digard sometimes welcomed foreplay to prepare herself for sex scenes, which does not contradict her point that she never performed penetrative sex on camera.

In addition to her work in feature films, Digard made many erotic and softcore pornographic loops for peep show exhibition and for sale on 8-mm film. Some of this material was later recycled to create pseudo-features such as John Holmes and the All-Star Sex Queens (1980) or anthologised on videocassette and DVD. Her Amazon-like screen presence and enthusiasm for the genre made her a favourite in the niche market for sexy fighting loops, of which she did at least thirty. These usually involved her wrestling other women (Candy Samples, Kelly Stewart, Serena), but some involved boxing, and some pitted her against men.

== Return to private life ==
Digard retired from the entertainment industry in 1982 and has not performed professionally since, although she continued her career in other fields. In 2013, she revealed that she had completed an autobiography. Titled I Used to Be Uschi, it is set to be published in February 2027 by Severin Films.
