= The Don Is Dead =

1973 film by Richard Fleischer

- Theatrical release poster
- Directed by: Richard Fleischer
- Written by: Marvin H. Albert; Christopher Trumbo; Michael Butler
- Based on: The Don is Dead (1972 novel) by Nick Quarry
- Produced by: Hal B. Wallis
- Starring: Anthony Quinn; Frederic Forrest; Robert Forster; Al Lettieri; Angel Tompkins; Charles Cioffi
- Cinematography: Richard H. Kline
- Edited by: Edward A. Biery
- Music by: Jerry Goldsmith
- Production company: Hal Wallis Productions
- Distributed by: Universal Pictures
- Release date: November 14, 1973
- Running time: 115 minutes
- Country: United States
- Language: English

The Don Is Dead is a 1973 American gangster film directed by Richard Fleischer and starring Anthony Quinn, Frederic Forrest, Robert Forster, Al Lettieri, Angel Tompkins, and Charles Cioffi. It is based on the 1972 novel by Marvin H. Albert (under the pen name 'Nick Quarry'), who also co-wrote the film with Christopher Trumbo and Michael Butler.

The film was released by Universal Pictures on November 14, 1973, to mixed reviews.

== Plot ==
Frank Regalbuto is the ambitious son of mafioso Don Paolo Regalbuto. He plans a heroin deal with the help of Tony Fargo and his brother Vince. But when a gangland snitch secretly tips off the cops, Frank's drug deal results in a violent gun battle, which Frank and the Fargos narrowly survive. Later, on discovering who set them up, Frank learns of his father's death due to illness.

A meeting called among the various mob families to select a new Don to succeed Paolo. It is decided that Frank, still too young to take over for his dead father, will instead learn the business under the wing of his father's lifelong friend, Don Angelo DiMorra. In doing so, Angelo becomes a sort of protector to the future Don.

Angelo begins a romance with aspiring singer Ruby Dunne, who unbeknownst to him has been dating Frank. Frank is tipped off, sending him into a destructive rage during which he beats Ruby so badly she is hospitalized. She informs Don Angelo, who swears vengeance against Frank. Frank survives the attempt on his life but the incident causes escalating violence between the factions to choose sides, and a bloody, all-out war is waged in the streets. Luigi Orlando advises both factions.

Many are killed, including Vince Fargo and Frank himself. Tony Fargo is galvanised by the losses and pursues Angelo's faction ruthlessly. Angelo suffers a heart attack as a result of the stress and is wheelchair bound and unable to speak. Tony successfully guesses that Orlando was the one who tipped off Frank about Angelo sleeping with Ruby, and Orlando is killed. Tony demands control over half the city in the settlement, with Angelo removed from power but provided for, to which a mute defeated Angelo assents.

== Cast ==
Credits from the AFI Catalog of Feature Films.

- Anthony Quinn as Don Angelo DiMorra
- Frederic Forrest as Tony Fargo
- Robert Forster as Frank Regalbuto
- Al Lettieri as Vince Fargo
- Angel Tompkins as Ruby Dunne
- Charles Cioffi as Luigi Orlando
- Jo Ann Meredith as Marie Orlando
- J. Duke Russo as Don Bernardo
- Louis Zorich as Mitch DiMorra
- Anthony Charnota as Johnny Tresca
- Ina Balin as Nella Fargo
- Joe Santos as Joe Lucci
- Frank DeKova as Giunta
- Abe Vigoda as Don Talusso
- Victor Argo as Augie "the Horse"
- Val Bisoglio as Pete Lazatti
- Robert Carricart as Mike Spada
- Frank Christi as Harold Early
- Sid Haig as the Arab
- Maurice Sherbanee as the Corsican
- Vic Tayback as Ralph Negri

Uncredited

- Ted White as Marty Rackheimer
- Lee Delano as Sam Zutti
- Carlos Romero as Mario Longobardo
- Ric Mancini as Sabbatini
- George Sawaya as Garcia

== Critical reception ==
On the review aggregation website Rotten Tomatoes, The Don is Dead holds a 60% positive rating, based on five reviews.

A.H. Weiler of The New York Times was positive: "Expertise, if not imagination, is evident in the explosive, action-oriented direction of Richard Fleischer... The Don Is Dead has the attributes of some lively, pithily accented performances that are adult and effectively natural. Among these are Forrest, as the brainly hood who attempts to escape the racket, but winds up a don, Al Lettieri, as his roughhewn, dependent, ill-fated brother, and Forster, as the rising, vengeful muscleman who is eventually cut down. As the embattled don who is finally felled by a stroke, not a gun, Quinn is moodily menacing and as polished and relaxed as a professional long familiar with this sort of role."

Chuck O'Leary of Fulvue Drive-In called it "A fun gangster potboiler made to cash in on the success of The Godfather. Full of shootings, double crosses, polyester and big '70s gas-guzzling cars."

Kevin Wight of The Wee Review gave the film 3 out of 5 stars, writing "For all the talent at work, it's ultimately forgettable, though plenty entertaining in the moment."
