= Readers Choice Award =

American literary award

Ellery Queen's Mystery Magazine (EQMM) honors authors each year as voted upon by readers, hence the name, Readers Choice Award. Recipients include many of the most popular authors of thrillers and mysteries.

== Presentation ==
Awards are bestowed in April of the following year, coinciding with the annual Mystery Writers of America conference, at an informal ceremony sponsored by Dell Publishing.

== Recipients ==
=== 2020 ===
- 1st : Barb Goffman, "Dear Emily Etiquette," Sept-Oct 2020
- 2nd : John M. Floyd, "Crow's Nest," Jan-Feb 2020
- 3rd : Gregory Fallis, "Terrible Ideas," Sept-Oct 2020

=== 2019 ===
- 1st : David Dean, "The Duelist," May–June 2010
- 2nd : Paul D. Marks, "Fade-out on Bunker Hill," Mar-Apr 2019
- 3rd : Doug Allyn (tied), "The Dutchy," Nov-Dec 2019
  - 3rd: G.M. Malliet, "Whiteout," Jan-Feb 2019

=== 2018 ===
- 1st : Stacy Woodson, "Duty, Honor, Hammett", Nov-Dec 2018
- 2nd : Josh Pachter, "50", Nov-Dec 2018
- 3rd : David Dean, "Sofee", Mar-Apr 2018

=== 2017 ===
- 1st : Brendan DuBois, "Flowing Waters", Jan 2017
- 2nd : Doug Allyn, "Tombstone", Nov-Dec 2017
- 3rd : Dave Zeltserman, "Cramer in Trouble", Mar-Apr 2017

=== 2016 ===
- 1st : Paul D. Marks, "Ghosts of Bunker Hill", Dec 2016
- 2nd : Doug Allyn, "Puncher's Chance", Jun 2016
- 3rd : Doug Allyn, "The Dropout", Mar-Apr 2016

=== 2014 ===
- 1st : Doug Allyn, "The Snow Angel", Jan 2014
- 2nd : Marilyn Todd, "Blood Red Roses", Sep-Oct 2014
- 3rd : Miriam Grace Monfredo, "The Tavern Keeper's Daughter", Dec 2014

=== 2013 ===
- 1st : Dave Zeltserman, "Archie Solves the Case", May 2013
- 2nd : Doug Allyn, "Borrowed Time", Mar-Apr 2013
- 3rd : Marilyn Todd, "The Wickedest Town in the West", Jun 2013

=== 2012 ===
- 1st : Doug Allyn, "Wood-Smoke Boys", Mar-Apr 2012
- 2nd : David Dean, "Mariel", Dec 2012
- 3rd : Lia Matera, "Champawat", Sep-Oct 2012

=== 2011 ===
- 1st : P. N. Elrod, "Beach Girl", Nov 2011
- 2nd : Doug Allyn, "A Penny for the Boatman", Mar-Apr 2011
- 3rd : Clark Howard, "Hangman's Rhapsody", Sep-Oct 2011

=== 2010 ===
- 1st : Dave Zeltserman, "Archie’s Been Framed", Sep-Oct 2010
- 2nd : Doug Allyn, "The Scent of Lilacs", Sep-Oct 2010
- 3rd : Doug Allyn, "Days of Rage", Mar-Apr 2010

=== 2009 ===
- 1st : Doug Allyn, (tied) "An Early Christmas", Jan 2009
- 1st : Mick Herron, "Dolphin Junction", Dec 2009
- 2nd : Clark Howard, "White Wolves", Nov 2009
- 3rd : Dave Zeltserman, "Julius Katz", Sep-Oct 2009

=== 2008 ===
- 1st : Kristine Kathryn Rusch, "The Secret Lives of Cats", Jul 2008
- 2nd : Doug Allyn, "The Sonnets of September", Jul 2008
- 3rd : Brendan DuBois, "The Blue Plate Special", Mar-Apr 2008

=== 2007 ===
- 1st : David Dean, (tied) "Ibrahim's Eyes", Jun 2007
- 1st : Edward D. Hoch, "The Theft of the Ostracized Ostrich", Sep-Oct 2007
- 2nd : Dale C. Andrews and Kurt Sercu, "The Book Case", May 2007
- 3rd : Doug Allyn, "Stone-Cold Christmas", Jan 2007

=== 2006 ===
- 1st : Leigh Lundin (writing under L. Leigh), "Swamped", Aug 2006
- 2nd : Doug Allyn, "The Black Chapel", Sep-Oct 2006
- 3rd : Edward D. Hoch, "A Convergence of Clerics", Dec 2006

=== 2005 ===
- 1st : Doug Allyn, "Wolf Woman Bay", Jun 2005
- 2nd : J. A. Konrath, "With a Twist", Dec 2005
- 3rd : Robert S. Levinson, "Death Conquers All", Sep-Oct 2005

=== 2004 ===
- 1st : Doug Allyn, "The Gin Mill", Sep-Oct 2004
- 2nd : Clark Howard, "Deep Lock", Dec 2004
- 3rd : Clark Howard, "Tequila Memories", Jun 2004

=== 2003 ===
- 1st : Doug Allyn, "Palace in the Pines", Jul 2003
- 2nd : Clark Howard, "The Mask of Peter", Apr 2003
- 3rd : Clark Howard, "The Leper Colony", Aug 2003

=== 2002 ===
- 1st : Jeffery Deaver, "Without Jonathan", Nov 2002
- 2nd : Edward D. Hoch, "The Problem of Bailey's Buzzard", Dec 2002
- 3rd : Doug Allyn, "Telephone to Forever", Jul 2002

=== 2001 ===
- 1st : Peter Sellers, "Avenging Miriam", Dec 2001
- 2nd : David Handler, "The Mondo Whammy", Sep-Oct 2001
- 3rd : Neil Schofield, "Groundwork", Nov 2001

=== 2000 ===
- 1st : Doug Allyn, "The Death Row Pet Show", Apr 2000
- 2nd : Doug Allyn, "The Christmas Mitzvah", Dec 2000
- 3rd : Donald Olson, "Don't Go Upstairs", Aug 2000

=== 1999 ===
- 1st : Clark Howard, "The Global Man", Dec 1999
- 2nd : Michael A. Kahn, "The Bread of Affliction", Sep-Oct 1999
- 3rd : Minette Walters, "The Tinder Box", Dec 1999

=== 1998 ===
- 1st : Kristine Kathryn Rusch, "Details", Dec 1998
- 2nd : Barbara D'Amato, "Of Course You Know That Chocolate Is a Vegetable", Nov 1998
- 3rd : Joan Richter, "Recipe Secrets", Sep-Oct 1998

=== 1997 ===
- 1st : Jeffery Deaver, "Double Jeopardy", Sep-Oct 1997
- 2nd : Doug Allyn, "Copperhead Run", Jun 1997
- 3rd : George C. Chesbro, "The Problem with the Pigs", Jun 1997

=== 1996 ===
- 1st : Doug Allyn, "Roadkill", May 1996
- 2nd : Doug Allyn, "Puppyland", Sep-Oct 1996
- 3rd : Steven Saylor, "The White Fawn", Dec 1996

=== 1995 ===
- 1st : Doug Allyn, (tied) "Franken Kat", mid-Dec 1995
- 1st : Jeffery Deaver, "Gone Fishing", Oct 1995
- 2nd : Brendan DuBois, "Heirlooms", Jul 1995
- 3rd : Edward D. Hoch, "The Killdeer Chronicles", Mid-Dec 1995

=== 1994 ===
- 1st : Jan Burke, "Unharmed", mid-Dec 1994
- 2nd : Doug Allyn, "Black Water", Oct 1994
- 3rd : Doug Allyn, "The Cross-Wolf", Mid-Dec 1994

=== 1993 ===
- 1st : Doug Allyn, "The Ghost Show", Dec 1993
- 2nd : Steven Saylor, "The House of the Vestals", Apr 1993
- 3rd : Peter Lovesey, "You May See a Strangler", Mid-Dec 1993

=== 1992 ===
- 1st : Doug Allyn, "Candles in the Rain", Nov 1992
- 2nd : Jo Bannister, "Howler", Oct 1992
- 3rd : Doug Allyn, "Icewater Mansions", Jan 1992

=== 1991 ===
- 1st : Peter Lovesey, "The Crime of Miss Oyster Brown", May 1991
- 2nd : Clark Howard, "Dark Conception", Oct 1991
- 3rd : Peter Lovesey, "Supper with Miss Shivers", Mid-Dec 1991

=== 1990 ===
- 1st : Clark Howard, "Deeds of Valor", Nov 1990
- 2nd : Clark Howard, "Challenge the Widow-Maker", Aug 1990
- 3rd : Peter Massarelli, "Once Upon a Time", Dec 1990

=== 1989 ===
- 1st : James Powell, "A Dirge for Clowntown", Nov 1989
- 2nd : Doug Allyn, "Star Pupil", Oct 1989
- 3rd : Patricia Moyes, "The Faithful Cat", Dec 1989

=== 1988 ===
- 1st : Clark Howard, "The Dakar Run", Aug 1988
- 2nd : Peter Lovesey, "The Wasp", Nov 1988
- 3rd : Clark Howard, "The Color of Death", Jun 1988

=== 1987 ===
- 1st : Robert Barnard, "The Woman in the Wardrobe", Dec 1987
- 2nd : Ann Bayer, "A Pleasure to Deal With", Nov 1987
- 3rd : John F. Suter, "That Man's Moccasins Have Holes", Jul 1987

=== 1986 ===
- 1st : Clark Howard, "Scalplock", Jul 1986
- 2nd : Thomas Adcock, "Thrown-Away Child", Oct 1986
- 3rd : Nell Lamburn, "Tom's Thatch", Jul 1986

=== 1985 ===
- 1st : Clark Howard, "Animals", Jun 1985
- 2nd : Lawrence Block, "Like a Bug on a Windshield", Oct 1985
- 3rd : Clark Howard, "McCulla's Kid", Sep 1985

== Records ==
Edward D. Hoch, who contributed a story each month, had so many stories nominated, they kept him from taking first place until 2007. He received notification shortly before his death.

Clark Howard often won first place and placed second or third in the same year.

Doug Allyn has won more often than any other author.

Leigh Lundin (under the pseudonym L. Leigh) in 2006 became the first first-time writer to take first place in a major Ellery Queen award.

Dale Andrews, a student of the Ellery Queen canon, became the first to place with an Ellery Queen story.
