= The Dark Goddess =

1978 novel by Marvin H. Albert

- First edition (UK)
- Author: Marvin H. Albert
- Cover artist: One Plus One Studio
- Language: English
- Genre: Archaeological, thriller
- Publisher: Doubleday & Company (US); Andre Deutsch (UK)
- Publication date: 1978
- Publication place: United States
- Media type: Print (hardback)
- Pages: 423 (1st edition)
- ISBN: 0-385-12182-2 (1st edition)

The Dark Goddess is a novel by French-American novelist Marvin H. Albert. It was first published in the United States by Doubleday & Company in 1978, and by Andre Deutsch in the United Kingdom.

== Plot ==
Archaeologist Moira Rhalles is kidnapped by the KGB while she is on a dig in France. Her historian husband and her ex-boyfriend team up to try to rescue her.

=== Explanation of the novel's title ===
The title refers to the dark earth-mother goddess, of which a Paleolithic statuette was made.

== Themes ==
The Dark Goddess has been described as a political suspense novel.
