= Debra Karen =

Canadian film and TV editor

- Born: Deborah Karjala
- Education: Dawson College
- Occupation: Film editor

Debra Karen is a Canadian film and TV editor known for her work on works like Meatballs and Happy Birthday to Me. In 2014, she was presented with the Canadian Cinema Editors' Lifetime Achievement Award. Her face appears on the artwork for David Cronenberg's film Shivers.

== Selected filmography ==
- The House by the Lake (1976)
- Ilsa, the Tigress of Siberia (1977)
- Blackout (1978)
- Meatballs (1979)
- Crunch (1980) (TV movie)
- Final Assignment (1980)
- Yesterday (1981)
- Happy Birthday to Me (1981)
- Heartbreak High (1981)
- Meatballs III: Summer Job (1986)
- The Incident (1990) (TV movie)
- Ivory Hunters (1990)
- The Last Elephant (1990)
- The First Circle (1992) (TV movie)
- Family Pictures (1993) (TV movie)
- Sweet Killing (1993)
- My Antonia (1995) (TV movie)
- Vanished (1995) (TV movie)
- A Green Journey (1997)
- Mandela and de Klerk (1997) (TV movie)
- The Legend of Sleepy Hollow (1999) (TV movie)
- Deadly Betrayal (2003) (TV movie)
- Salem Witch Trials (2003) (TV movie)
- Wicked Minds (2003) (TV movie)
