= The Law and Jake Wade =

1958 film

- Theatrical Film Poster
- Directed by: John Sturges
- Written by: Marvin H. Albert (novel)
- Screenplay by: William Bowers
- Produced by: William Hawks
- Starring: Robert Taylor; Richard Widmark; Patricia Owens; Robert Middleton; Henry Silva; DeForest Kelley; Burt Douglas; Eddie Firestone; Rory Mallinson; Roy Engle; Richard Cutting
- Cinematography: Robert Surtees
- Edited by: Ferris Webster
- Music by: Fred Steiner
- Distributed by: Metro-Goldwyn-Mayer
- Release date: June 6, 1958
- Running time: 88 minutes
- Country: United States
- Language: English
- Budget: $1,538,000
- Box office: $2,795,000

The Law and Jake Wade is a 1958 American Western film directed by John Sturges and starring Robert Taylor and Richard Widmark. The picture was based on the 1956 novel by Marvin H. Albert. The film was shot on location in California's High Sierra mountain range, Lone Pine, and Death Valley in Metrocolor by MGM and in CinemaScope. This film was Robert Taylor's last A-picture as the top-billed lead.

== Plot ==
Reformed criminal Jake Wade breaks his former partner, Clint Hollister, out of jail in the small western town of Morganville. The men have not seen each other since the bank robbery and murder that resulted in Wade's arrest. Wade refuses to tell Hollister where he has hidden the $20,000 from the robbery and advises him to leave the territory. Wade returns to Cold Stream, where he serves as marshal. Hollister and his men catch up with Wade, kidnap his fiancee, Peggy, and demand that Wade take him to the buried money.

The next morning, they begin a long trek into the desert, during which Peggy learns the full extent of her husband's criminal background. After several adventures, the group arrives at a ghost town, where Wade reveals he has hidden the money. When Wade spots Comanche scouts in the area, the group takes shelter in a deserted saloon. Wade is tied to a chair while Hollister goes in search of the natives. As night falls, several calls are heard outside and Wade tells the men they are surrounded by Comanche who will attack soon.

After Hollister returns the next morning, the natives attack and a vicious fight breaks out. During the fight, Peggy frees Jake, and they attempt to escape, but Hollister catches them. After burying the dead, Wade reveals the money is buried three feet deep in the cemetery, inside a saddlebag. Wade digs up the saddlebag, then surprises Hollister by pulling out a pistol from it. The others surrender their guns. Wade then asks Hollister's man Ortero to take Peggy away and they ride out of town. Wade and Hollister confront each other in the street and Wade kills Hollister. Hearing the gunshots, Peggy and Ortero return for Wade.

== Cast ==
- Robert Taylor as Jake Wade
- Richard Widmark as Clint Hollister
- Patricia Owens as Peggy
- Robert Middleton as Ortero
- Henry Silva as Rennie
- DeForest Kelley as Wexler (credited as De Forest Kelley)
- Burt Douglas as Lieutenant
- Eddie Firestone as Burke
- Fred Coby as Deputy (uncredited)
- Gene Coogan as Minor Role (uncredited)
- Richard H. Cutting as Luke, Jake's Deputy (uncredited)
- Roy Engel as Avery (uncredited)
- Al Ferguson as Minor Role (uncredited)
- Rory Mallinson as Deputy (uncredited)
- Reginald Simpson as Minor Role (uncredited)
- Henry Wills as Cavalry Sergeant

== Box office ==
According to MGM records, the film earned $970,000 in the US and Canada and $1,825,000 elsewhere, resulting in a profit of $87,000.
