= Marvin Albert =

American writer (1924–1996)

- Born: Marvin H. Albert; January 22, 1924; Philadelphia, Pennsylvania, United States
- Died: March 25, 1996 (aged 72); Menton, France
- Occupations: Novelist, screenwriter
- Years active: 1956–1992

Marvin H. Albert (January 22, 1924 – March 25, 1996) was an American writer of mystery, crime and adventure novels including ones featuring Pete (Pierre-Ange [French: Stone Angel]) Sawyer, a French-American private investigator living and working in France.

== Biography ==
During World War II Albert served in the United States Merchant Marine as a radio operator. After working as the director of a Philadelphia children's theater troupe he moved to New York in 1950 and began writing and editing for Quick and Look magazines.

He began writing full-time over the success of his 1956 Western novel The Law and Jake Wade. He sometimes wrote under pseudonyms such as Albert Conroy, Ian McAlister, Nick Quarry and Anthony Rome. Settings for his novels include France (where he lived for some time), Miami and the Old West. A 1975 international suspense thriller, The Gargoyle Conspiracy, written under his own name, was an Edgar nominee in the category of Best Mystery Novel.

== Novels ==
=== Westerns ===
- The Law and Jake Wade (1956), filmed under the same title (1958)
- Apache Rising (1957), filmed as Duel at Diablo (1966)
- The Bounty Killer (1958), filmed as (Italian-Spanish movie) El Precio de un Hombre (1966), aka The Ugly Ones in the US.
- Renegade Posse (1958), filmed as Bullet for a Badman (1964)
- The Reformed Gun (1959)
- Rider from Wind River (1959)
- Posse at High Pass (1964)

=== Westerns written under the name Al Conroy ===
A series featuring the common character Clayburn. They were later reprinted in 1989-90 under Marvin Albert's own name.

- Clayburn (1961).
- Last Train to Bannock (1963)
- Three Rode North (1964)
- The Man in Black (1965), filmed as Rough Night in Jericho (1967; Albert also wrote the screenplay)

=== Detective novels written under the name Al Conroy ===
- The Road's End (1952)
- The Chiselers (1953)
- Nice Guys Finish Dead (1957) (filmed as À Corps À Cris (1989)
- Murder in Room 13 (1958) (filmed as Adieu Marin! (1993)
- The Mob Says Murder (1958)
- Devil in Dungarees (1960)

=== Jake Barrow Private Eye written under the name Nick Quarry ===
- The Hoods Come Calling (1958)
- The Girl with No Place to Hide (1959)
- Trail of a Tramp (1960)
- Till It Hurts (1960)
- No Chance in Hell (1960)
- Some Die Hard (1961)

=== Tony Rome series ===
A series featuring the private detective Tony Rome.

- Miami Mayhem (As Anthony Rome - 1960), filmed as Tony Rome (1967)
- The Lady in Cement, (As Anthony Rome, but published in England - 1961) filmed as Lady in Cement (1968)
- My Kind of Game (As Anthony Rome - 1962)

A 1967 television pilot under the name Nick Quarry was based on Tony Rome

=== as Nick Quarry ===
- The Don Is Dead (1972) (filmed in 1972)
- The Vendetta (1972)

=== Mafia fiction as Al Conroy ===
Series character: Johnny Morini, Soldato: Man Against the Mafia.

- Soldato! (1972)
- Death Grip! (1972)
- Strangle Hold! (1973)
- Murder Mission! (1973)
- Blood Run! (1973)

=== Stone Angel series ===
A series featuring the common character Pete Sawyer.

- The Dark Goddess (1978)
- Stone Angel (1986)
- Back in the Real World (1986)
- Get Off at Babylon (1987)
- Long Teeth (1987)
- The Last Smile (1988)
- The Midnight Sister (1989)
- Bimbo Heaven (1990)
- The Zig-Zag Man (1991)
- The Riviera Contract (1992)

=== as Ian McAlister ===
- Skylark Mission (1973)
- Driscoll's Diamonds (1973)
- Strike Force 7 (1974)
- Valley of the Assassins (1975)

=== Other crime thrillers ===
- Lie Down with Lions (1959)
- The Looters (as Albert Conroy - 1961), filmed as Estouffade à la Caraïbe (1966)
- The Gargoyle Conspiracy (1975)

== Non fiction works ==
- The Long White Road a biography of the Antarctic explorer Ernest Shackleton
- Broadsides and Boarders a history of great sea captains
- The Divorce (1965) about Henry VIII

== Film novelizations ==
- Party Girl (1958)
- That Jane from Maine (1959)
- Pillow Talk (1959)
- All the Young Men (1960)
- Come September (1961)
- Force of Impulse (1961)
- Lover Come Back (1962)
- Move Over, Darling (1963)
- The V.I.P.s (1963)
- Palm Springs Weekend (1963)
- Under the Yum Yum Tree (1963)
- The Pink Panther (1963)
- The Outrage (1964)
- Goodbye Charlie (1964)
- Honeymoon Hotel (1964)
- What's New Pussycat? (1965)
- The Great Race (1965)
- Strange Bedfellows (1965)
- Do Not Disturb (1965)
- A Very Special Favor (1965)
- Crazy Joe (1974) as Mike Barrone
- The Untouchables (1987)

== TV tie-ins ==
- Mr. Lucky (1959), an original novel based on the TV series as by Al Conroy
- Storefront Lawyers (1970), novelization of the pilot teleplay as by A.L. Conroy [sic]

== Screenplays ==
- Duel at Diablo (1965)
- Rough Night in Jericho (1967)
- Lady in Cement (1968)
- A Twist of Sand (1968)
- The Don Is Dead (1973)

== Other works ==
As J. D. Christilian - "Scarlet Women" (1996).

As Marvin H. Albert - "Operation Lila" (1983), "The Medusa Complex", "Dancer's Progress and Schrodingers Cat"(1993 - possibly two stories in one volume) and "Hidden Lives" (1981).

== Personal life ==
He was survived by his artist wife Xenia Klar, one son, and one grandchild.

== In popular culture ==
In the movie Once Upon a Time in Hollywood, the character Rick Dalton is seen reading and discussing a western-themed paperback novel that features a character named Tom Breezy. The novelization of Once Upon a Time in Hollywood includes an ad for the fictitious Tom Breezy book, which is identified as Ride a Wild Bronc by Marvin H. Albert.
