= The City (1977 film) =

- Genre: Crime; Drama
- Written by: John Wilder
- Directed by: Harvey Hart
- Starring: Robert Forster; Don Johnson; Ward Costello; Jimmy Dean; Mark Hamill
- Theme music composer: John Elizalde
- Country of origin: United States
- Original language: English

Production
- Executive producer: Quinn Martin
- Producer: John Wilder
- Cinematography: Jacques R. Marquette
- Editors: Ray Daniels; Jim Gross
- Running time: 78 minutes
- Production company: Quinn Martin Productions

Original release
- Network: NBC
- Release: January 12, 1977

The City is a 1977 American made-for-television crime drama film starring Robert Forster, Ward Costello, Don Johnson, Jimmy Dean, and Mark Hamill.

== Background ==
The City was produced as a pilot for a proposed television series, which was picked up by NBC. It was originally broadcast on January 12, 1977, and was the original pilot for Quinn Martin's "Tales of the Unexpected" which premiered a few weeks later on February 2, 1977.

== Plot ==
Los Angeles Police Department Homicide Lieutenant Matt Lewis and Sergeant Brian Scott are assigned to investigate a puzzling murder: a man is apparently killed at random, with no obvious motive. As Lewis and Scott dig deeper into the case, they uncover a far more troubling pattern at work.

The murder victim is linked to the charismatic country-music star Wes Collins, whose public persona masks a less-secure private life. Collins performs for adoring fans and lives in a handsome suburban home with his young son Donnie, but his past contains shadows that become relevant to the case. Collins is confronted by Collins’s business associates and his manager about the mounting strain of the investigation that seems to target someone in his orbit.

The detectives trace the crimes to Eugene Banks, a disturbed young man whose behaviour grows increasingly erratic and dangerous. Banks is haunted by the belief that Wes Collins is his biological father — a conviction stemming from the dying statements of his mother, who, on her deathbed, insisted that Collins abandoned her and the child years ago. This alleged abandonment fuels Banks’s deep-seated rage and desire for vengeance.

As Banks prepares his revenge, Lt. Lewis and Sgt. Scott race against time to protect Collins and his family. Banks begins by stalking and terrorising people close to Collins, killing one of the detectives who tries to intervene, and issuing threats that blur the line between celebrity target and former parent figure.

Throughout the investigation, Lewis and Scott uncover the traumatic background that shaped Banks’s psyche: his early years included abandonment, confusion, and the unresolved question of his father’s identity. Collins’s past — including a fleeting relationship with Banks’s mother and an on-stage punching incident when Banks was a child — becomes central to the case.

In the climax, Banks confronts Collins at his home, triggering a violent encounter in which the detectives intervene. A tense showdown ensues, forcing Collins to face the consequences of his past and forcing Banks to confront the destructiveness of his revenge. The detectives secure Banks before more lives are lost, and the case closes. Collins, shaken by his ordeal, reflects on the cost of fame and the responsibilities of fatherhood, while Lewis and Scott prepare to return to the city’s daily grind — having averted major tragedy, but at the expense of unsettling truths about family, identity, and vengeance.

== Cast ==
- Mark Hamill as Eugene Banks
- Robert Forster as Lieutenant Matt Lewis
- Don Johnson as Sergeant Brian Scott
- Paul Cavonis as Detective Burt Frescura
- Ward Costello as Captain Lloyd Bryant
- Jimmy Dean as Wes Collins
- Susan Sullivan as Carol Carter
- Adam Rich as Donnie Collins
