= Journey Through Rosebud =

- Directed by: Tom Gries
- Screenplay by: Albert Ruben
- Starring: Robert Forster
- Cinematography: Minervino Rojas
- Edited by: Patricia Finn Lewis
- Music by: Johnny Mandel
- Distributed by: GSF
- Release date: March 2, 1972
- Running time: 93 minutes
- Country: United States
- Language: English

Journey Through Rosebud is a 1972 American drama film directed by Tom Gries. It stars Robert Forster.

== Plot ==
A draft dodger lands on an Indian reservation where a Vietnam veteran lives with his ex-wife.

== Cast ==
- Robert Forster as Frank
- Kristoffer Tabori as Danny
- Victoria Racimo as Shirley
- Eddie Little Sky as Stanley Pike
- Roy Jenson as Park Ranger
- Hal Jason Fuller Sr. as the boy who enters the tribal office to deliver a message
- Wright King as an Indian agent

== See also ==
- List of American films of 1972
