= Paul D. Marks =

American novelist and short story writer

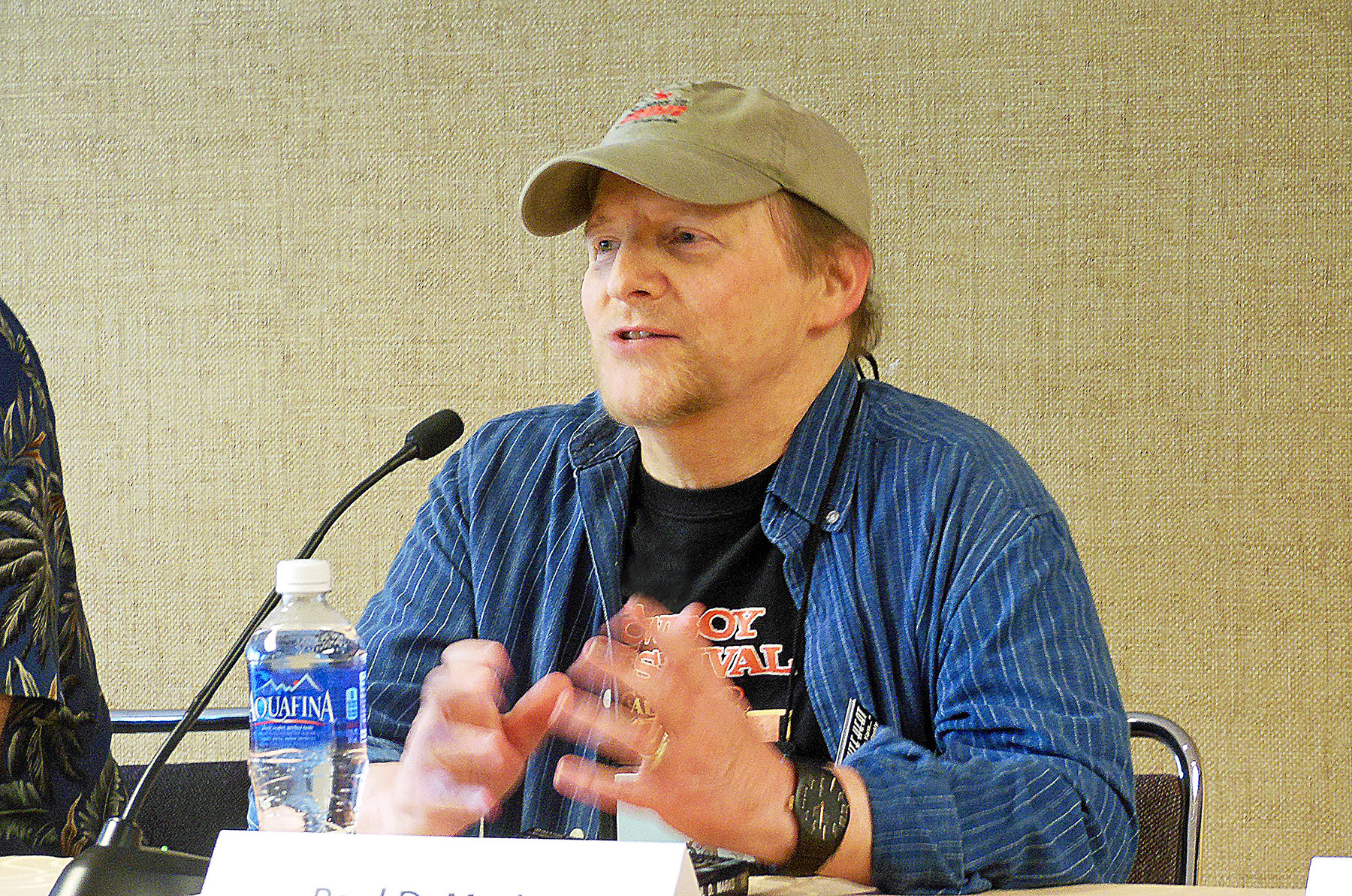
- Left Coast Crime, Monterrey, CA
- Occupation: Writer
- Writing career
- Genre: Crime fiction
- Notable works: Duke Rogers Series (White Heat, Broken Windows), Bobby Saxon Series (The Blues Don't Care), Coast to Coast Anthology Series (Co-Editor)
- Notable awards: Shamus Award (2013); Macavity (2018); Ellery Queen Mystery Magazine Readers Award (2016, 2020)
- Website: pauldmarks.com

Paul D. Marks (died February 28, 2021) was an American novelist and short story writer. His novel White Heat, a mystery-thriller set during the Rodney King riots of 1992, won the first Shamus Award for Independent Private Eye Novel from the Private Eye Writers of America.

His story "Ghosts of Bunker Hill" (EQMM December 2016) was voted #1 in Ellery Queen Mystery Magazine’s 2016 Readers Choice Award and was nominated for a Macavity Award for Best Short Story. "Bunker Hill Blues" (EQMM September/October 2017) came in #6 in the 2018 Ellery Queen Mystery Magazine's poll. "Howling at the Moon" (EQMM November 2014) was short-listed for both the 2015 Anthony Award and Macavity Award for Best Short Story, and came in #7 in Ellery Queen’s Reader’s Choice Award. Marks’ story “Windward” from the Coast to Coast: Private Eyes from Sea to Shining Sea anthology was selected for the 2018 Best American Mystery Stories (Houghton Mifflin Harcourt), edited by Louise Penny & Otto Penzler. "Windward" also won the 2018 Macavity Award for Best Short Story and was short-listed for the 2018 Shamus Award for Best Short Story and was a 2018 Derringer finalist in the Best Novelette category. Coast to Coast: Private Eyes from Sea to Shining Sea, which was co-edited by Marks and Andrew McAleer, was nominated for a 2018 Anthony Best Anthology award. "Fade-out on Bunker Hill" (EQMM March/April 2019) came in #2 in Ellery Queen's Mystery Magazine's 2019 Readers Choice Award.

His fiction was recognized by the SouthWest Writers, Lorian Hemingway International Short Story Competition, Futures Fire to Fly, Southern Writers Association, Deadly Ink Short Story Competition, and Glimmer Train Very Short Fiction.

His short fiction was published in Ellery Queen Mystery Magazine, Akashic's Noir series (St. Louis), Alfred Hitchcock Mystery Magazine, Crimestalker Casebook and more. He was co-editor of the Coast to Coast: Sea to Shining Sea mystery anthologies from Down & Out Books.

According to Steven Bingen, co-author of MGM: Hollywood’s Greatest Backlot, Marks was also the last person to have shot a film on the MGM backlot. “That 40 page chronological list I mentioned of films shot at the studio ends with his [Paul D. Marks’] name on it.”

He served on the boards of the Los Angeles chapters of Sisters in Crime and the Mystery Writers of America.

== Career ==
A native of Los Angeles, much of Marks’ writing was inspired by the city's history and culture. Los Angeles and Southern California is often as much a “character” in his work as the human characters. Novelist and Anthony Award finalist, S.W. Lauden has said of Marks’ work: “…[it’s] almost as if the region was one of the main characters.”

His stories often dealt with the changing nature of the city and the displacement it causes people. His characters were frequently people who time has passed by or who no longer fit in today's society.

Marks’ first novel, the Shamus-Award-winning White Heat, takes place during the Rodney King Riots and deals with race and racism in the context of a mystery-thriller. Vortex, his second full-length work, is also set in Los Angeles and updates the noir theme of a soldier returning home from war feeling alienated. Both are heavily influenced by the Los Angeles region and vibe. His Ellery Queen Reader's Choice Award-winning short story, Ghosts of Bunker Hill, is set in the Angelino Heights community of old Victorian houses and LA's downtown Bunker Hill neighborhood, and was inspired by his explorations of the area before it was torn down for redevelopment.

Though mostly known for mystery novels, crime and noir fiction, he wrote in a variety of genres, including mainstream and literary. Terminal Island, the story of Japanese immigrants in a fishing community off the coast of Los Angeles and their interaction with a new white neighbor during World War II was published in Weber: The Contemporary West.

Marks’ influences included Raymond Chandler, Dashiell Hammett, David Goodis, Dorothy B. Hughes, John Fante, Ross Macdonald, Walter Mosley, James Ellroy and even artist Edward Hopper. He also was influenced by film noir, Los Angeles history, including the Hollywood “dream factories,” and various styles of music.

He studied short story writing under T.C. Boyle, at USC. Marks' non-fiction articles have appeared in the Los Angeles Daily News, the Los Angeles Herald Examiner, and American Premiere magazine. He was also a contributing editor to The Hollywood Gazette.

Marks blogged on a periodic basis at: 7CriminalMinds.blogspot.com and SleuthSayers.org

== Bibliography ==
=== P.I. Duke Rogers Series ===
- White Heat, Marks’ Shamus Award-winning novel, re-published May, 2018 by Down & Out Books.
- Broken Windows, the sequel to White Heat, September, 2018 by Down & Out Books.

=== Editor ===
- Coast to Coast Anthologies:
- Coast to Coast: Murder from Sea to Shining Sea, September 2015, co-edited with Andrew McAleer and includes the Shamus Award-nominated story The Dead Detective by Robert Levinson
- Coast to Coast: Private Eyes from Sea to Shining Sea, January 2017, also co-edited with Andrew McAleer and includes the Agatha Award-nominated story A Necessary Ingredient by Art Taylor
- Coast to Coast: Noir from Sea to Shining Sea, September 2020, also co-edited with Andrew McAleer. Was named "Best of 2020" by Suspense Magazine in the Anthology category.

=== Stand-Alones ===
- The Blues Don't Care (a Bobby Saxon Mystery), June 2020
- Vortex, September 2015
- L.A. Late @ Night: 5 Noir & Mystery Tales from the Dark Streets of Los Angeles, February 2014

=== Awards and nominations ===
Year	Title	Type	Award	Result	Publication
2020	The Blues Don't Care	Novel	Suspense Magazine Best of 2020	Named Best of 2020 in Historical Fiction	Suspense Magazine - January 2021
2020	Coast to Coast: Noir from Sea to Shining Sea	Short Story Anthology	Suspense Magazine Best of 2020	Named Best of 2020 in Anthologies	Suspense Magazine - January 2021
2020	The Blues Don't Care	Novel	Crime Fiction Lover: DeathBecomesHer Top Five Books of 2020	Top Five Books of 2020	Crime Fiction Lover
2020	Fade-Out on Bunker Hill	Short Story	Ellery Queen Mystery Magazine Readers Choice Award - Voted #2 for 2019	Nominated and came in 2nd Place in Reader's Poll	Ellery Queen Mystery Magazine - March/April 2019
2018	Windward	Short Story	Macavity Award – Best Short Story 2018	Won	Coast to Coast: Private Eyes from Sea to Shining Sea
2018	Windward	Short Story	Shamus Award – Best Short Story 2018	Nominated	Coast to Coast: Private Eyes from Sea to Shining Sea
2018	Windward	Short Story	Derringer Award - Best Novelette 2018	Nominated	Coast to Coast: Private Eyes from Sea to Shining Sea
2018	Windward	Short Story	Best American Mystery Stories 2018	Chosen for the Best American Mystery Stories anthology edited by Otto Penzler and Louise Penny	Best American Mystery Stories 2018
2018	Coast to Coast: Private Eyes from Sea to Shining Sea	Anthology	Anthony Award - Best Anthology 2018	Nominated	Coast to Coast: Private Eyes from Sea to Shining Sea
2017	Bunker Hill Blues	Short Story	Ellery Queen Mystery Magazine Readers Choice Award - Voted #6 for 2017	Nominated	Ellery Queen Mystery Magazine - September 2017
2017	Ghosts of Bunker Hill	Short Story	Macavity Award – Best Short Story 2017	Nominated	Ellery Queen Mystery Magazine - December 2016
2017	Ghosts of Bunker Hill	Short Story	Ellery Queen Mystery Magazine Readers Choice Award - Voted #1 for 2016	Won	Ellery Queen Mystery Magazine - December 2016
2015	Howling at the Moon	Short Story	Macavity Award – Best Short Story 2015	Nominated	Ellery Queen Mystery Magazine - November 2014
2015	Howling at the Moon	Short Story	Anthony Award - Best Short Story 2015	Nominated	Ellery Queen Mystery Magazine - November 2014
2015	Howling at the Moon	Short Story	Ellery Queen Mystery Magazine Readers Choice Award - Voted #7 for 2014	Nominated	Ellery Queen Mystery Magazine - November 2014
2013	White Heat	Novel	Shamus Award – Best Indie P.I. Novel 2012	Won	
2010	Poison Heart	Short Story	Deadly Ink 2010 Short Story Competition	Publication in Deadly Ink anthology	Deadly Ink 2010 Short Story Competition
2009 - 2010	Endless Vacation	Short Story	Lorian Hemingway Short Story Competition	Honorable Mention	
2009 - 2010	Endless Vacation	Short Story	Glimmer Train - Very Short Fiction Award - July 2009	Honorable Mention	
