= Small Crimes =

- Official release poster
- Directed by: Evan Katz
- Screenplay by: Evan Katz; Macon Blair
- Based on: Small Crimes by Dave Zeltserman
- Produced by: David Lancaster; Stephanie Wilcox
- Starring: Nikolaj Coster-Waldau; Gary Cole; Molly Parker; Macon Blair; Pat Healy; Jacki Weaver; Robert Forster
- Cinematography: Andrew Wheeler
- Edited by: Josh Ethier
- Music by: Will Blair; Brooke Blair
- Production companies: Rooks Nest Entertainment; Fairmount Films; Rumble Films
- Distributed by: Netflix
- Release dates: March 11, 2017 (SXSW); April 28, 2017 (United States)
- Running time: 95 minutes
- Country: United States
- Language: English
- Box office: $1.4 million

Small Crimes is a 2017 American crime film directed by E. L. Katz from a screenplay by Katz and Macon Blair, based on the novel of the same name by Dave Zeltserman. The film stars Nikolaj Coster-Waldau as Joe Denton, a former cop recently released from prison for attempted murder. The film also stars Gary Cole, Molly Parker, Macon Blair, Pat Healy, Jacki Weaver, and Robert Forster. Small Crimes premiered at South by Southwest on March 11, 2017, and was released by Netflix on April 28, 2017.

== Plot ==
Former cop Joe Denton is released from jail. Six years earlier, while on the mob's payroll, Denton attacked district attorney Phil Coakley, earning him the enmity of the police and the nickname "slash cop".

He moves in with his elderly parents and tracks down his ex-wife on the internet. After briefly talking to one of his daughters, his ex-wife takes the phone and threatens to press charges if he contacts them again.

Although a recovering alcoholic, he goes to a bar. Scotty, the brother of Denton's slain partner, greets him and offers him any help he needs. A young barfly asks Denton for a ride home. Denton is surprised when she reveals herself to be Coakley's daughter and intentionally bloodies herself. Hearing her cries for help, two men drag Denton from his car; Denton beats both men savagely. Denton is questioned by the police, but Coakley admits the evidence backs up his story and reluctantly asks if Denton wants to press charges. Denton declines, saying he wants to leave his history in the past, to the disgust of Coakley and Lieutenant Pleasant, who calls him a disgrace.

Pleasant, also corrupt, demands Denton kill mob boss Manny Vassey, who has found religion on his deathbed. Pleasant explains Vassey's guilty conscience may lead him to confess to Coakley. Pleasant promises to help Denton renegotiate the terms of the settlement with his ex-wife if he kills Vassey.

Denton goes to suffocate Vassey, only to be interrupted by Charlotte Boyd, Vassey's hospice nurse. Denton smoothly thanks her for her work and leaves the house, where he encounters Vassey's sadistic son, Junior. Junior threatens to kill Denton, enraged that Vassey will see him while avoiding his own son.

Frustrated with his suspicious behavior, Denton's parents demand explanations. When they disbelieve his lies, Denton angrily accuses them of having no faith in his redemption. Denton encounters Boyd again at a diner, and the two soon begin dating. After Pleasant threatens him and his parents, Denton probes Boyd for a way to access Vassey. When this fails, Pleasant suggests he murder Coakley instead. Denton breaks into Coakley's house but can not bring himself to do it. Instead, he bribes Toni, a prostitute Coakley has been seeing, into secretly recording him.

Denton sets up a camera in Coakley's motel room and waits in a nearby room for Coakley to arrive. During Coakley's tryst, Toni's boyfriend Rooster arrives. Driven by jealousy, Rooster kills Toni and is killed by Coakley in return. Denton witnesses the shooting and waits for Coakley to leave before running into the room to look for the camera. Realizing that Coakley found and took the camera, Denton returns home dejected.

After another argument with his parents, an unknown assailant fires several shots into Denton's parents' house, wounding his mother. Denton confesses to Boyd that the situation has spiraled out of control. She assures him it will work out, and, unknown to Denton, murders Vassey. Junior catches Boyd in the act. Denton is kidnapped by Junior's thugs and Junior reveals he has tortured and presumably killed Boyd. While Denton is denying involvement in Vassey's death, they are interrupted by the arrival of Scotty.

Denton and Scotty kill Junior and his thugs, but Scotty is shot. Denton attempts to save Scotty but stops when he learns that Scotty was the one who shot his mother. Coakley had revealed to Scotty that Denton killed Scotty's brother, under Junior's orders. Denton leaves Scotty to die and receives a call from Pleasant informing him that Coakley died in a car accident. Coakley had been distracted, watching the recording of his shooting of Rooster.

Denton ransacks his parents' house for dirty money they found and hid from him. Denton finds the money, declaring he will deliver it to his children, but Denton's father says he will not allow the self-destructive Denton near them. When Denton says he can't stop him, his father stabs him. In his dying moments, Denton wipes his father's fingerprints off the knife and adds his own, to make the wound appear self-inflicted.

== Cast ==
- Nikolaj Coster-Waldau as Joe Denton
- Gary Cole as Dan Pleasant
- Molly Parker as Charlotte Boyd
- Macon Blair as Scotty Caldwell
- Pat Healy as Junior Vassey
- Jacki Weaver as Irma Denton
- Robert Forster as Joe Denton Sr.

In addition, Michael Kinney portrays Phil Coakley, while Shawn Lawrence plays Manny Vassey.

== Production ==
Director E. L. Katz and producer David Lancaster were first revealed to be producing on the film in May 2016, with Katz working with Macon Blair to adapt Dave Zeltserman's novel of the same name. The next week, Nikolaj Coster-Waldau joined the cast of the film. Jacki Weaver, Robert Forster, Gary Cole, and Molly Parker were all announced to have joined the cast in July 2016. Filming began in Montreal, Quebec shortly after the cast was finalized.

== Release ==
Small Crimes premiered at South by Southwest on March 11, 2017, as part of the "Narrative Spotlight" screenings. Netflix purchased the distribution rights to the film a month ahead of its premiere, and the film was released exclusively on Netflix on April 28, 2017.

=== Critical response ===
On the review aggregator website Rotten Tomatoes, 59% of 17 critics' reviews are positive, with an average rating of 5.3/10. Metacritic, which uses a weighted average, assigned the film a score of 60 out of 100, based on 6 critics, indicating "mixed or average" reviews.

In positive reviews, David Ehrlich of IndieWire and Britt Hayes of ScreenCrush particularly praised Nikolaj Coster-Waldau's performance and character, with Ehrlich saying that "as much of a chore as [Small Crimes] can be to sift through at times, there’s a well-conceived method to all of this densely packed madness" and Hayes stating that "Coster-Waldau is a pro at playing narcissists, but in Small Crimes he brings additional pathos to the role of Joe".They gave the film B+ and 8 out of 10 respectively. Brian Tallerico of RogerEbert.com stated that while Small Crimes was "similarly clever if a bit less satisfying" than Cheap Thrills, he praised the supporting cast (particularly Gary Cole and Pat Healy) and the film's clean conclusion. Michael Roffman of Consequence of Sound similarly praised Coster-Waldau's performance, along with those of Jacki Weaver and Robert Forster, as well as the film's tonal shifts "that make each outcome even more jarring". He rated the film a B. Jacob Hall of /Film gave the film a 7.5 out of 10, negatively comparing the film to Cheap Thrills but enjoyed it overall. He praised the performances (with the exception of Coster-Waldau's) and plot. Mike D'Angelo of The A.V. Club also praised Forster's performance and the tone of the film, saying "If the film came across as jaded and cynical, it might well be hard to take. Instead, it seems weary and defeated, as if some people are simply born to fail."

Conversely, Kristy Puchko of The Playlist criticized the film's humor and called it "one note". While she praised the performances of Daniela Sandiford, Cole, Weaver, Forster, and Healy, Puchko stated that Coster-Waldau's performance "keeps us at a distance, unable to connect, empathize, or care". She rated the film a C−. Sheila O'Malley, also writing for RogerEbert.com, criticized the script's lack of any exposition, saying that "it's hard to figure out what actually happened, who did what to whom". While she praised the execution of the characters, she also commented on the presence of "a lot of dead air". She rated the film two out of four stars.

=== Box office ===
While the film was purchased and streamed by Netflix, it did receive a limited theatrical release in overseas markets, grossing US$1.4 million at the box office.
