= Grave Intentions =

- Directed by: Lukas Hassel; Brian Patrick Lim; Gabriel Olson
- Written by: Gabriel Olson; Matthew Richards; Jaime Snyder; Lukas Hassel; Brian Patrick Lim; Brian Rish; Jocelyn Rish
- Starring: Joy Vandervort-Cobb; Beth Grant; Sharon Lawrence; Robert Forster; Lukas Hassel
- Distributed by: Terror Films
- Release date: October 15, 2021
- Running time: 88 minutes
- Country: United States
- Language: English

Grave Intentions is a 2021 American anthology horror film directed by Lukas Hassel, Brian Patrick Lim and Gabriel Olson and starring Joy Vandervort-Cobb, Beth Grant, Sharon Lawrence, Robert Forster (in his final film appearance) and Hassel.

== Cast ==
- Joy Vandervort-Cobb as Madam Josephine
- Beth Grant as Mattie Whalen
- Robert Forster as Don Whalen
- Sharon Lawrence as Olivia Korhonen
- Kevin Dee as Willie Bingham
- Gregory J. Fryer as George Morton
- Charly Thorn as Florence
- Lucas Oktay as Young Luke
- Lukas Hassel as Father
- Colleen Carey as Mother
- Astarte Abraham as Aunt/Mom

== Release ==
The film was released on digital on October 15, 2021.

== Reception ==
The film has a 67% rating on Rotten Tomatoes based on six reviews.

Bobby LePire of Film Threat gave the film a 9 out of 10 and wrote "As with all anthologies, some portions of Grave Intentions are stronger than others. But each tale at least has one or two stand-out elements that make them worthy of watching."
