= Robert Forster =

American actor (1941–2019)

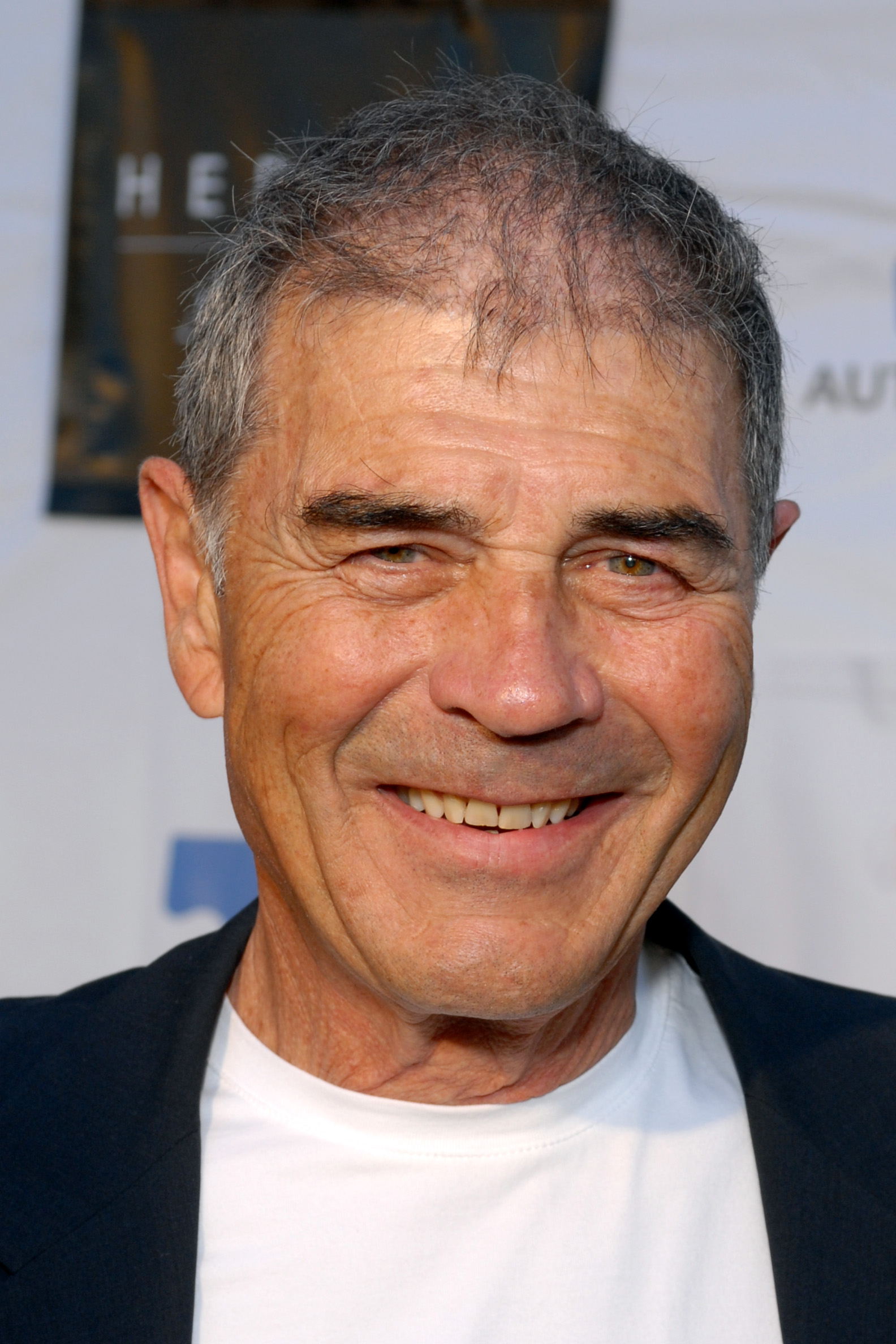
- Forster in 2009
- Born: Robert Wallace Foster Jr. July 13, 1941; Rochester, New York, U.S.
- Died: October 11, 2019 (aged 78); Los Angeles, California, U.S.
- Education: University of Rochester
- Occupation: Actor
- Years active: 1965–2019
- Spouses: June Forster (m. 1966; div. 1975); Zivia Forster (m. 1978; div. 1980)
- Partner: Denise Grayson (2004–2019)
- Children: 4

Robert Wallace Foster Jr. (July 13, 1941 – October 11, 2019), known professionally as Robert Forster, was an American actor. He made his screen debut as Private L.G. Williams in John Huston's Reflections in a Golden Eye (1967), followed by a starring role as news reporter John Cassellis in the landmark New Hollywood film Medium Cool (1969). For his portrayal of bail bondsman Max Cherry in Quentin Tarantino's Jackie Brown (1997), he was nominated for the Academy Award for Best Supporting Actor.

Forster played a variety of both leading and supporting roles in over 100 films, including Captain Dan Holland in The Black Hole (1979), Detective David Madison in Alligator (1980), Abdul Rafai in The Delta Force (1986), Colonel Partington in Me, Myself & Irene (2000), Scott Thorson in The Descendants (2011), General Edward Clegg in Olympus Has Fallen (2013) and its sequel London Has Fallen (2016), Norbert Everhardt in What They Had (2018), and Sheriff Hadley in The Wolf of Snow Hollow (2020).

He also had prominent roles in television series such as Banyon (1971–73), Nakia (1974), Karen Sisco (2003–04), Heroes (2007–08), Twin Peaks: The Return (2017) and the Breaking Bad episode "Granite State" as Ed "The Disappearer" Galbraith, for which he won the Saturn Award for Best Guest Starring Role on Television. He reprised the role in the film El Camino: A Breaking Bad Movie (2019) and Better Call Saul (2020).

== Early life ==
Forster was born and raised in Rochester, New York. His mother was Italian American, while his father was of English and Irish descent. He earned a bachelor's degree in psychology from the University of Rochester. He performed in a number of plays in college, and decided to become an actor.

Forster added another "R" to his surname as there was another member of the Screen Actors Guild named Robert Foster.

== Career ==
=== Early stardom ===
Forster made his Broadway debut in 1965 in Mrs. Dally Had a Lover, opposite Arlene Francis and Ralph Meeker. He also starred in productions of Come Blow Your Horn, The Big Knife, and The Glass Menagerie.

Forster's movie career began strongly, when John Huston cast him in the important role of Private Williams in Reflections in a Golden Eye (1967), opposite Elizabeth Taylor and Marlon Brando. The movie featured a famous scene where Forster rode naked on a horse. Forster also appeared in episodes of the TV series N.Y.P.D., Judd, for the Defense and Premiere, the latter also featuring Dustin Hoffman and Sally Kellerman. Forster was then cast in another key role in an important movie: part-Indian Army scout Nick Tana in Robert Mulligan's The Stalking Moon (1968); he was billed third, after Gregory Peck and Eva Marie Saint.

Forster had a key support role in Justine (1969), directed by George Cukor and starring Dirk Bogarde, which was a huge flop. He starred in the critically acclaimed film Medium Cool (1969), which was also a big hit commercially.

Forster played a tormented priest in Pieces of Dreams (1970) and a student filmmaker in Cover Me Babe (1970), which was a box office flop. He was cast in the pilot for a TV series Banyon, playing a private eye in late 1930s in Los Angeles, then starred in Journey Through Rosebud which was not released theatrically. He directed for the Rochester Community Theatre.

A year after the pilot for Banyon was made, it was picked up for a series but had only a short run. After this cancellation Forster said his career "started to slip and then it slipped and then it slipped."

In 1973, he briefly returned to Broadway playing Stanley Kowalski in a revival of A Streetcar Named Desire, opposite Julie Harris. He also played Juror No. 3 in the first New York stage production of Twelve Angry Men at the Queens Playhouse.

=== Career slump ===
After a support part in The Don Is Dead (1972), Forster starred in the TV movie The Death Squad (1974) then another short-lived TV series, Nakia (1974), playing a Navajo detective.

Forster guest starred on shows such as Medical Story, Gibbsville and Police Story and played the lead in the TV movies Royce (1976), The City (1977) (with Don Johnson), Standing Tall (1978), and The Darker Side of Terror (1979). He toured in a stage production of One Flew Over the Cuckoo's Nest and appeared in The Sea Horse on stage in Louisville.

Forster moved into lower-budgeted movies, starring in Stunts (1977) for Mark L. Lester and Avalanche (1978), the latter opposite Rock Hudson and Mia Farrow for Roger Corman's New World Pictures. Also for New World, Forster had an unbilled cameo in The Lady in Red (1979). This was written by John Sayles and directed by Lewis Teague who later collaborated on Alligator (1980), which starred Forster. He played a key support role in Disney's The Black Hole (1979).

Throughout the 1980s Forster alternated between television and low budget films. He was in the comedy Heartbreak High (1981), and the action films Vigilante (1983), Walking the Edge (1985), The Delta Force (1986), and Counterforce (1988). He wrote, starred in, produced and directed Hollywood Harry (1985), in which he invested all his savings. That year he stated "Not one of my movies made a dime. I've never had anything that approached a hit in my entire career of 15 movies and a lot of TV shows."

Forster appeared in the thrillers Satan's Princess (1989) and The Banker (1989), the mini series Goliath Awaits (1981), and episodes of Magnum, P.I., Tales from the Darkside, Hotel, Crossbow, and Jesse Hawkes. He was in the TV movie Mick and Frankie (1989).

Forster's films by this stage were almost entirely low budget ones: Peacemaker (1990), Checkered Flag (1990), Countdown to Esmeralda Bay (1990), Long Way Back (1990), Committed (1991), Diplomatic Immunity (1991), 29th Street (1991), In Between (1992), In the Shadow of a Killer (1992), Maniac Cop 3: Badge of Silence (1993), South Beach (1993), American Yakuza (1993), Cover Story (1993), Point of Seduction: Body Chemistry III (1993), Scanner Cop II (1995), Guns & Lipstick (1995), The Method (1995), Original Gangstas (1996) (directed by Larry Cohen), Uncle Sam (1996), Hindsight (1996) and American Perfekt (1997).

He appeared in series such as Jake and the Fatman, P.S.I. Luv U, Silk Stalkings, Murder, She Wrote, One West Waikiki and Walker, Texas Ranger.

=== Jackie Brown and later work ===
Forster appeared in Jackie Brown as bail bondsman Max Cherry, which earned him a nomination for the Academy Award for Best Supporting Actor in 1997. Jackie Brown revitalized Forster's career, an effect that occurred for many actors appearing in Quentin Tarantino films. He subsequently had consistent work in the film industry, appearing in Like Mike, Mulholland Drive, Supernova, Me, Myself & Irene (2000), Human Nature (2001), Confidence (2003), Charlie's Angels: Full Throttle (2003), Lucky Number Slevin (2006), and Firewall (2006).

Forster continued to appear in lower budgeted productions like Night Vision (1997) along with the remakes of Rear Window (1998) and Psycho (1998).

He appeared in the made-for-television movie The Hunt for the BTK Killer, as the detective intent on capturing serial killer Dennis Rader. Forster also played the father of Van on the short-lived Fox series Fastlane.

Forster recorded a public service announcement for Deejay Ra's Hip-Hop Literacy campaign, encouraging reading of books by Elmore Leonard, whose book Rum Punch was adapted as Jackie Brown.

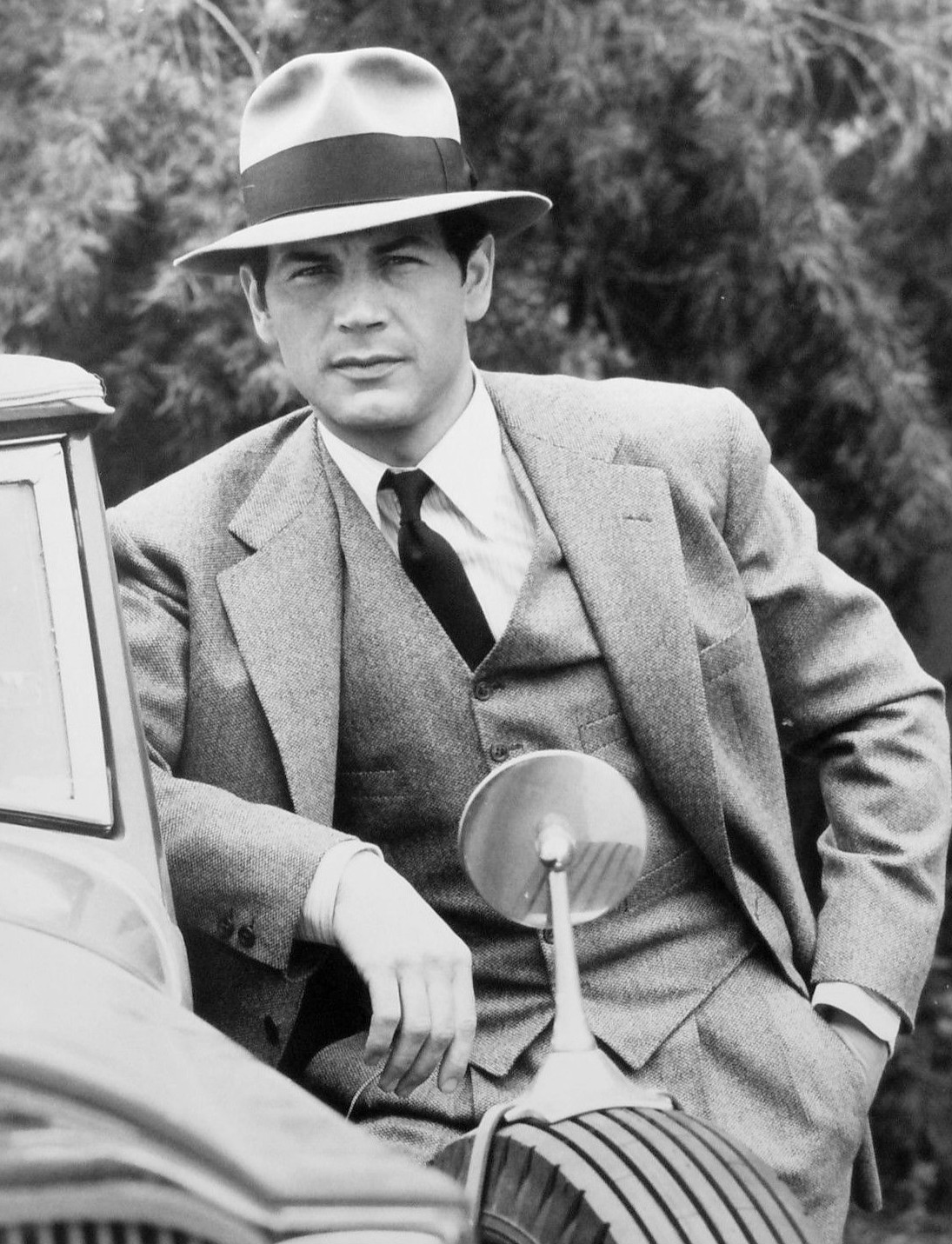
Forster as the title character in the NBC series Banyon, 1972

He appeared in the hit NBC series Heroes as Arthur Petrelli, the father of Nathan and Peter Petrelli, as well as the Emmy Award-winning AMC crime drama Breaking Bad as Walter White's new-identity specialist Ed Galbraith (a role he reprised in El Camino: A Breaking Bad Movie and Better Call Saul). He played Bud Baxter, father to Tim Allen's Mike Baxter, on the ABC (later Fox) hit comedy Last Man Standing. Forster was also a motivational speaker.

He was the first choice to play Sheriff Harry S. Truman in David Lynch's Twin Peaks, but had to turn it down due to a prior commitment to a different television pilot, and was replaced by Michael Ontkean. He appeared in Lynch's Mulholland Drive, a pilot for a TV series that was not picked up but was later turned into a critically acclaimed movie, and finally appeared in Twin Peaks, playing the brother of Sheriff Harry S. Truman, Sheriff Frank Truman, in Twin Peaks: The Return, when Ontkean was not available to reprise his role.

About this, Forster said: "David Lynch, what a good guy he is. He wanted to hire me for the original, 25 years ago, for a part, and I was committed to another guy for a pilot that never went. So I didn't do the original Twin Peaks, which would have been a life-changer. It's a gigantic hit if you remember those years, a phenomenon. But I didn't do that. [...] And this time, I got a call from my agents and they said, David Lynch is going to call you. When he called me five minutes later, he said, "I'd like you to come and work with me again." And I said, 'Whatever it is, David, here I come!'"

Forster appeared in the TV series Alcatraz.

His final movie appearance was in El Camino: A Breaking Bad Movie, reprising the character of Ed the "Disappearer" from the Breaking Bad series. He died on the day the movie was released. According to Aaron Paul (the actor for Jesse Pinkman), they spoke on the day of his death. Forster had been able to see the film. Four months later, Forster again appeared posthumously as Ed in episode "Magic Man" of the fifth season of Better Call Saul. The episode ended with a dedication to "our friend Robert Forster." He also appeared in an episode "Dynoman and The Volt" of the rebooted Amazing Stories television series before his death; the episode was dedicated to Forster.

== Personal life ==
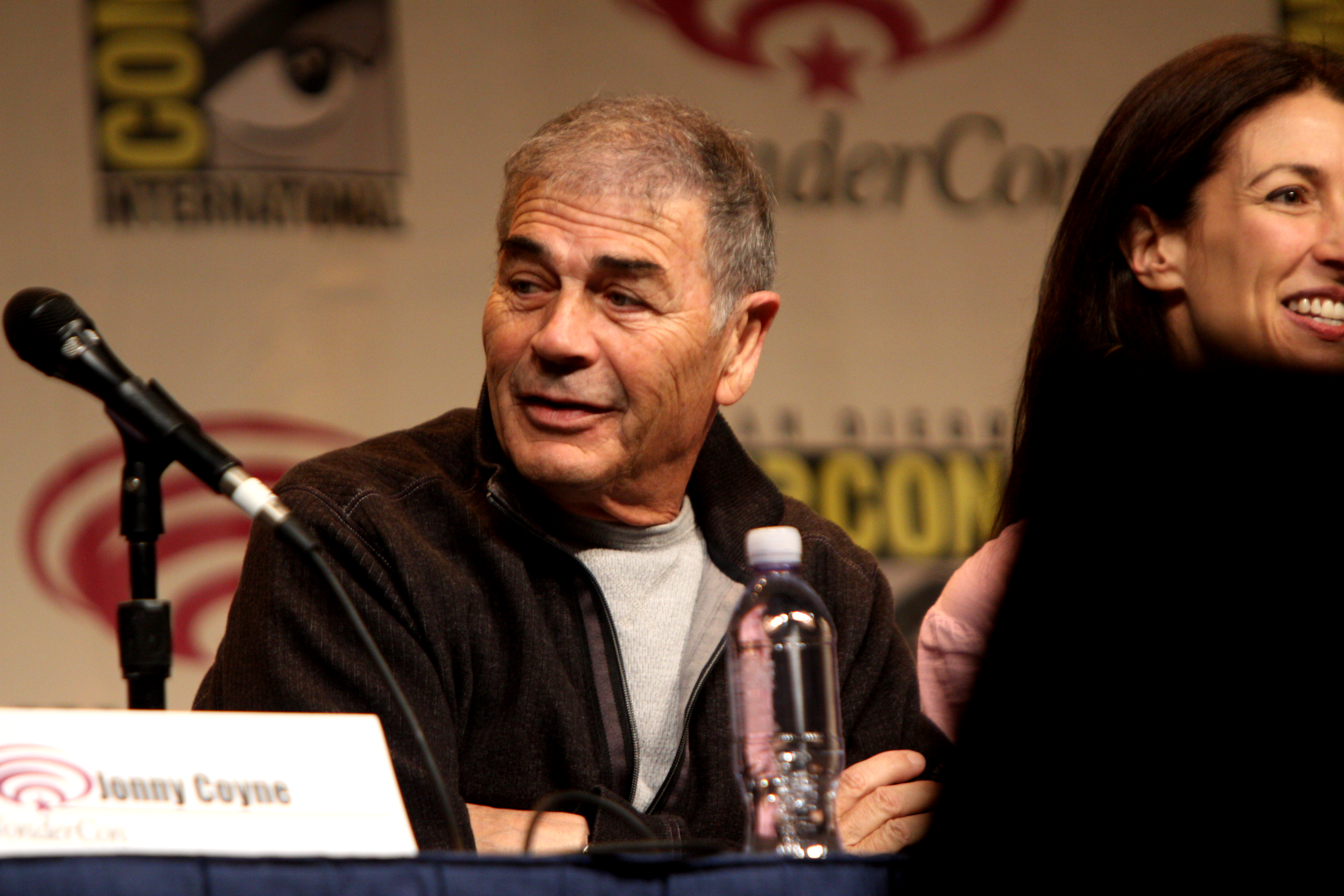
Forster at the 2012 WonderCon

Forster was married to June Forster (née Provenzano) from 1966 to 1975. The couple had met at their alma mater, the University of Rochester. The marriage produced three daughters. Robert was married to Zivia Forster from 1978 to 1980. He also had a son from a previous relationship. From 2004 to the time of his death, his longtime partner was Denise Grayson. He was a member of the high-IQ Triple Nine Society.

== Death ==
In June 2019, Forster was diagnosed with a brain tumor, and he died from the disease at his home in Los Angeles on October 11, 2019, at the age of 78, on the day El Camino: A Breaking Bad Movie was released, hours after watching it.

== Filmography ==
=== Film ===
Year	Title	Role	Notes
1967	Reflections in a Golden Eye	Private L.G. Williams	
1968	The Stalking Moon	Nick Tana	
1969	Justine	Narouz	
1969	Medium Cool	John Cassellis	
1970	Pieces of Dreams	Gregory Lind	
1970	Cover Me Babe	Tony Hall	
1972	Journey Through Rosebud	Frank	
1973	The Don Is Dead	Frank Regalbuto	
1974	The Death Squad	Eric Benoit	ABC Movie of the Week
1974	Nakia	Deputy Nakia Parker	Pilot for ABC series, broadcast as ABC Movie of the Week
1977	Stunts	Glen Wilson	
1978	Avalanche	Nick Thorne	
1979	The Lady in Red	'Turk'	Uncredited
1979	The Black Hole	Captain Dan Holland	
1980	Alligator	Detective David Madison	
1981	Heartbreak High	Coach Alan Arnoldi	
1983	Vigilante	Eddie Marino	
1985	Walking the Edge	Jason Walk	
1986	The Delta Force	Abdul Rafai	
1986	Hollywood Harry	Harry Petry	Also producer and director
1988	Counterforce	The Dictator	
1989	Satan's Princess	Lou Cherney	
1989	The Banker	Dan Jefferson	
1989	Esmeralda Bay	Madero	
1990	Peacemaker	Yates	
1991	Committed	Dr. Desmond Moore	
1991	Checkered Flag	Jack Cotton	
1991	Diplomatic Immunity	Stonebridge	
1991	29th Street	Sergeant Tartaglia	
1991	In Between	Vinnie	
1993	Maniac Cop III: Badge of Silence	Dr. Powell	
1993	South Beach	Detective Ted Coleman	
1993	American Yakuza	Littman	
1993	Cover Story	Therapist	
1994	Point of Seduction: Body Chemistry III	Bob Sibley	
1995	Scanners: The Showdown	Captain Jack Bitters	
1995	Guns and Lipstick	Captain Dimaggio	
1996	The Method	Christian's Father	
1996	Original Gangstas	Detective Slatten	
1996	Uncle Sam	Congressman Alvin Cummings	
1996	Hindsight	Michael Donahue	
1997	American Perfekt	Jake Nyman	
1997	Demolition University	Gentry	
1997	Jackie Brown	Max Cherry	
1997	Night Vision	Teak Taylor	
1998	Psycho	Dr. Simon	
1998	Outside Ozona	Odell Parks	
1999	It's the Rage	Tyler	
1999	Family Tree	Henry Musser	
1999	Kiss Toledo Goodbye	Sal Fortuna	
2000	Supernova	A.J. Marley	
2000	The Magic of Marciano	Henry	
2000	Lakeboat	Joe Litko	
2000	Cowboys and Angels	Barbequeman At Wedding	Uncredited
2000	Me, Myself & Irene	Colonel Partington	
2000	Diamond Men	Eddie Miller	Also executive producer
2001	Mulholland Drive	Detective Harry McKnight	
2001	Human Nature	Nathan's Father	
2001	Finder's Fee	Officer Campbell	
2002	Lone Hero	Gus	
2002	Strange Hearts	Jack Waters	
2002	Like Mike	Coach Wagner	
2003	Confidence	Morgan Price	
2003	Charlie's Angels: Full Throttle	Roger Wixon	
2003	Grand Theft Parsons	Stanley Parsons	
2006	Firewall	Harry Romano	
2006	Lucky Number Slevin	Murphy	
2006	Wild Seven	Wilson	
2007	Rise: Blood Hunter	Lloyd	
2007	D-War	Jack Wilson	
2007	Cleaner	Arlo Grange	
2008	Expecting Love	George Patten	
2008	Jack and Jill vs. the World	Norman / Narrator	Uncredited
2008	Touching Home	Jim 'Perk' Perkins	
2009	Thick as Thieves	Lieutenant Sam Weber	
2009	Ghosts of Girlfriends Past	Sergeant Mervis Volkom	
2009	Middle Men	Louie 'La-La'	
2010	The Bannen Way	Mr. B	
2010	The Trial	Ray	
2010	Kalamity	Tom Klepack	
2011	Girl Walks into a Bar	Dodge	
2011	The Descendants	Scott Thorson	
2012	Hotel Noir	Jim Logan	
2013	Olympus Has Fallen	General Edward Clegg	
2013	Coffee, Kill Boss	Walt Ford	
2013	Somewhere Slow	Chris McConville	
2014	Autómata	Robert Bold	
2015	Survivor	Bill Talbot	
2015	Too Late	Gordy Lyons	
2015	The Adventures of Biffle and Shooster	James Burke / Lieutenant Frank Murphy	
2016	London Has Fallen	General Edward Clegg	
2016	The Confirmation	Otto	
2016	The American Side	Sterling Whitmore	
2016	Bus Driver	General Sorbin	
2017	Small Town Crime	Steve Yendel	
2017	Small Crimes	Joe Denton Sr.	
2017	The Case for Christ	Walter Strobel	
2017	Acts of Vengeance	Chuck	
2018	What They Had	Norbert Everhardt	
2018	Damsel	Old Preacher	
2018	The Big Take	Detective Aborn	
2018	Bigger	Joe (2008)	
2019	Phil	Bing Fisk	
2019	El Camino: A Breaking Bad Movie	Ed Galbraith	
2019	QT8: The First Eight	Himself	Documentary; Posthumous release
2020	The Wolf of Snow Hollow	Sheriff Hadley	Posthumous release
2021	Grave Intentions	Don Whalen	Segment: "The Bridge Partner"; Posthumous release; Final film role

==== Short films ====
Year	Title	Role
2000	It's a Shame About Ray	Wally
2003	Where's Angelo?	Bob
2007	Grampa's Cabin	Grampa
2010	Red Princess Blues	The Storyteller
2015	The Biffle Murder Case	James Burke
2015	The Bridge Partner	Don Whalen
2015	Run Fast	Peter Cirone
2015	The Program	Michael
2015	Home	Man
2018	Nasty	Bob

=== Television ===
Year	Title	Role	Notes
1967	N.Y.P.D.	Tony	Episode: "To Catch a Hero"
1968	Judd, for the Defense	Ray Elliott	Episode: "In a Puff of Smoke"
1968	Premiere	Doug Payson	Episode: "Higher and Higher, Attorneys at Law"
1971–1973	Banyon	Miles Banyon	16 episodes
1974	Nakia	Deputy Nakia Parker	14 episodes
1974	The Death Squad	Eric Benoit	Television film
1975	Medical Story	David Corbin	Episode: "The Moonlight Heater"
1975–1977	Police Story	Various roles	5 episodes
1977	The City	Lieutenant Matt Lewis	Pilot
1978	Standing Tall	Luke Shasta	Television film
1979	The Darker Side of Terror	Paul Corwin	Television film
1981	Goliath Awaits	Commander Jeff Selkirk	Television film
1985	Magnum, P.I.	Tyler Peabody McKinney	2 episodes
1986	Tales from the Darkside	Gary Gooley	Episode: "The Milkman Cometh"
1986	Murder, She Wrote	Gilbert Gaston	Episode: "The Perfect Foil"
1987	Hotel	Steve Cameron	Episode: "Unfinished Business"
1987	Once a Hero	Gumshoe	7 episodes
1987–1988	William Tell	Aymong	3 episodes
1989	Mick and Frankie	Feinstein	Failed pilot
1991	Jake and the Fatman	Ed Delaney	2 episodes
1991	P.S. I Luv U	Dan	Episode: "There Goes the Neighbourhood"
1992	In the Shadow of a Killer	Charles Galbis	Television film
1993	Silk Stalkings	Vince Riker	Episode: "Tough Love"
1993	Sex, Love and Cold Hard Cash	Sid	Television film
1995	Walker, Texas Ranger	Ricky Rickettes	Episode: "The Big Bingo Bamboozle"
1995	Murder, She Wrote	Frank Roussel	Episode: "Big Easy Murder"
1995	One West Waikiki	Gerard Foster	Episode: "Flowers of Evil"
1997	Walker, Texas Ranger	Lane Tillman	Episode: "Texas vs. Cahill"
1998	Rear Window	Detective Charlie Moore	Television film
1999	Todd McFarlane's Spawn	Major Forsberg	Voice, 3 episodes
2000	Godzilla: The Series	Jack Chapman, Police Officer	Voice, episode: "Wedding Bells Blew"
2001	Like Mother Like Son	Ken 'Pappa' Kimes	Television film
2002	Murder in Greenwich	Steve Carroll	Television film
2002	Due East	Jesse Rapple	Television film
2002–2003	Fastlane	Raymond Ray	2 episodes
2003	Undefeated	Scott Green	Television film
2003	Street Time	Tony DeAngelo	Episode: "Cop Killer"
2003–2004	Karen Sisco	Marshall Sisco	10 episodes
2004	The Grid	Jay Aldrich	6 episodes
2004	Clubhouse	Burt Austin	Episode: "Spectator Interference"
2004–2005	Huff	Ben Huffstodt	3 episodes
2005	Tilt	Jimmy "Gentleman Jim" Towne	2 episodes
2005	Justice League Unlimited	The President	Voice, 2 episodes
2005	Bounty Hunters	Jerry	Pilot
2005	The Hunt for the BTK Killer	Detective Jason Magida	Television film
2006	Numb3rs	Agent Thomas Lawson	Episode: "Protest"
2006	13 Graves	Tom Ferris	Pilot
2007	Army Wives	General Grayson	Episode: "Truth and Consequences"
2007	Desperate Housewives	Nick Delfino	Episode: "Now I Know, Don't Be Scared"
2007–2008	Heroes	Arthur Petrelli	10 episodes (season 3)
2008	The Simpsons	Lucky Jim	Voice, episode: "Sex, Pies and Idiot Scrapes"
2011	CSI: NY	Joe Vincent	Episode: "Indelible"
2012	Alcatraz	Ray Archer	4 episodes
2012	Transformers: Prime	General Bryce	Voice, episode: "Grill"
2012	The Eric Andre Show	Himself	Episode: "J-Moe"
2012–2018	Last Man Standing	Bud Baxter	10 episodes
2013	NTSF:SD:SUV::	Booth Whitman	Episode: "Unfrozen Agent Man"
2013	Breaking Bad	Ed Galbraith	Episode: "Granite State"
2013	Ironside	Virgil's Father	Episode: "Hidden Agenda"
2014	Intruders	Frank Shepherd	2 episodes
2014–2015	Teenage Mutant Ninja Turtles	Jack J. Kurtzman	Voice, 4 episodes
2015	Childrens Hospital	Donald	Episode: "The 27 Club"
2015	Backstrom	Sheriff Blue Backstrom	2 episodes
2016	Divorce	Donald	2 episodes
2017	Twin Peaks: The Return	Sheriff Frank Truman	10 episodes
2017	I'm Dying Up Here	Guy Apuzzo	Episode: "Pilot"
2020	Better Call Saul	Ed Galbraith	Posthumous release; episode: "Magic Man"
2020	Amazing Stories	Grandpa Joe Harris	Posthumous release; episode: "Dynoman and The Volt"

== Partial stage credits ==
Year	Title	Role	Original venue	Notes
1965	Mrs. Dally Had a Lover	Frankie	John Golden Theater, Broadway	
1971	The Glass Menagerie		Theatre in the Tracks, Off-Off-Broadway	Also director
1972	Twelve Angry Men	Juror No. 3	Queens Playhouse, Off-Broadway	
1973	A Streetcar Named Desire	Stanley Kowalski	Vivian Beaumont Theater, Broadway	Replacement
2017	Chasing Mem'ries	Franklin	Geffen Playhouse, Los Angeles	

== Awards and nominations ==
Award	Year	Category	Nominated work	Result	Ref.
Academy Awards	1998	Best Supporting Actor	Jackie Brown	Nominated	
AARP Movie Awards	2019	Best Supporting Actor	What They Had	Nominated	
Chicago Film Critics Association	1998	Best Supporting Actor	Jackie Brown	Nominated	
Chlotrudis Award	2002	Best Actor	Diamond Men	Nominated	
Gotham Awards	2011	Best Ensemble Cast	The Descendants	Nominated	
Georgia Film Critics Association	2011	Best Supporting Actor	The Descendants	Nominated	
Hamptons International Film Festival	2000	Special Recognition	Diamond Men	Won	
Kansas City Film Critics Circle Award	1998	Best Supporting Actor	Jackie Brown	Won	
Newport Beach Film Festival	2018	Icon Award	Body of Work	Awarded	
Saturn Awards	1998	Best Supporting Actor	Jackie Brown	Nominated	
Saturn Awards	2008	Guest Actor – Television	Heroes	Nominated	
Saturn Awards	2014	Guest Actor – Television	Breaking Bad	Won	
Screen Actors Guild Award	2011	Outstanding Cast in a Motion Picture	The Descendants	Nominated	
Southeastern Film Critics Association	2011	Best Ensemble	The Descendants	Nominated	
Winter Film Awards	2016	Best Actor	The Bridge Partner	Nominated	
