= Eddie Little Sky =

American film and television actor (1926–1997)

- Eddie Little Sky in the role of "Chief of Crow" in the 1965 western spoof The Hallelujah Trail
- Born: Edsel Wallace Little; August 15, 1926; Pine Ridge Indian Reservation, South Dakota, US
- Died: September 5, 1997 (aged 71); Pennington, South Dakota, US
- Occupation: Actor
- Years active: 1957–1979
- Spouse(s): Dawn Gates (c. 1950 – 1997; his death); 8 children

Eddie Little Sky (August 15, 1926 – September 5, 1997), also known as Edward Little, was an American actor. A citizen of the Oglala Lakota tribe Eddie had parts in 36 feature films and over 60 television shows, mainly westerns in the role of a Native American. He was one of the first Native American actors to play Native American roles such as his performance in the 1970 film A Man Called Horse.

== Career ==
Little Sky was born as Edsel Wallace Little on the Pine Ridge Indian Reservation in Shannon County, South Dakota to Oglala Lakota parents Wallace Henry Little (1901–1984) and Wileminna Colhoff. He attended the Holy Rosary Indian Mission school as a child. After leaving the United States Navy, where he had served in the Pacific theater during World War II, he began working the rodeo circuit as a bull rider and bareback rider.

Following his work on the 1955 film Chief Crazy Horse, Audie Murphy encouraged Little Sky to become a professional actor; thus Little Sky, along with Jay Silverheels and Chief Dan George became one of the first Native Americans to play Native American roles in films. Hollywood normally used white actors wearing black wigs and dark make-up to play the parts of Native Americans. His first television role was in 1957 on the series Cheyenne in the episode titled The Iron Trail. In 1958 he appeared on Have Gun - Will Travel S2 E13 "The Solid Gold Patrol" as Chief White Bull.

From that time onwards, Little Sky had numerous roles in many Western television series such as Gunsmoke, Bat Masterson, The Rifleman, The Virginian, The Men From Shiloh (rebranded name of The Virginian), Bonanza, Daniel Boone and The High Chaparral.

He also played in many films such as The Light in the Forest, Paint Your Wagon, Duel at Diablo, Breakheart Pass, The Hallelujah Trail, and his performance as Black Eagle in the 1970 film A Man Called Horse which starred Richard Harris. He was also technical adviser for Soldier Blue. He made several appearances as a Pacific native on Gilligan's Island.

== Later years/marriage ==
Upon his retirement from the film industry in the late 1970s, he worked as director of the Oglala Lakota Tribal Parks and Recreation Authority. He married Dawn Gates (née Eunice Elsie Gates), who became an actress known as Dawn Little Sky (1930-2025); the couple had eight children, only three of whom (Tojan Norma Rendon, Prairie Rose Little Sky-White, and John “Chepa” Little Sky) survived their parents, i.e. were still alive as of 2025.

== Death ==
Eddie Little Sky died on September 5, 1997, aged 71, in Pennington County, South Dakota from lung cancer. He was interred at the Little's Flat Family cemetery in Oglala, South Dakota.

== Filmography ==
Year	Title	Role	Notes
1956	Westward Ho the Wagons!	Pawnee Brave	Uncredited
1956	Revolt at Fort Laramie	Red Cloud	
1957	Tomahawk Trail	Johnny Dogwood	
1957	Apache Warrior	Apache	
1958	The Missouri Traveler	Red Poole	
1958	Gun Fever	2nd Indian chief	
1958	The Light in the Forest	Little Crane	Uncredited
1958	Tonka	Spotted Tail	Uncredited
1959	Tales of Wells Fargo	Indian Leader	S3/E23 "Lola Montez"
1959	Escort West	Indian	Uncredited
1959	The FBI Story	Henry Roanhorse	Uncredited
1960	Heller in Pink Tights	Indian	Uncredited
1960	Hell Bent for Leather	William	
1960	Oklahoma Territory	Cherokee	Uncredited
1961	Cimarron	Ben Red Feather	Uncredited
1961	Buffalo Gun	Sartu	
1962	Sergeants 3	Ghost Dancer	
1964	7 Faces of Dr. Lao	George C. George	
1965	The Hallelujah Trail	Crow Chief	Uncredited
1965	Daniel Boone	Grey Eagle	S1/E28 "Doll of Sorrow"
1966	Duel at Diablo	Alchise	
1966	The Professionals	Jake's Prisoner	Uncredited
1966	Bob Hope Presents the Chrysler Theatre	Red Cloud	S4/E6 "Massacre at Fort Phil Kearny"
1967	The Way West	Sioux Warrior	Uncredited
1967	The Last Challenge	Indian	Uncredited
1968	The High Chaparral	Alacran	S1/E19 "Gold Is Where You Leave It"
1969	Paint Your Wagon	Indian	
1970	A Man Called Horse	Black Eagle	
1970	Then Came Bronson	Boise Idaho	S1/E20 "Mating Dance for Tender Grass"
1970	Soldier Blue	Indian Scout	Uncredited
1970	Run, Simon, Run	Santana	ABC Movie of the Week
1971	The Virginian	Grey Bull	S9/E21 "The Regimental Line"
1972	Journey Through Rosebud	Stanley Pike	
1974	Movin' On	Freewater	S1/E13 "Goin' Home: Part 2"
1974	Dusty's Trail	Natuma	S1/E8 "Tomahawk Territory"
1975	Breakheart Pass	White Hand	
1977	The Car	Denson	
1978	How the West Was Won	Drives-His-Horses	3 episodes
