= Heartbreak High (film) =

- Directed by: Mark Warren
- Written by: Bruce Calnan; Douglas Ditonto; Richard Sauer
- Produced by: Jim Hanley
- Starring: John Vernon; Norman Fell; Robert Forster; Thom Haverstock; Terry Swiednicki; Keith Brown; Christine Cattell; Lisa Schwartz; Paul Backewich; Anthony Sherwood; Matt Birman; Katherine Trowell
- Cinematography: François Protat
- Edited by: Debra Karen
- Music by: Richard Cooper
- Release date: August 28, 1981
- Running time: 91 min.
- Countries: United States; Canada
- Language: English

Heartbreak High, also known as The Kinky Coaches And The Pom Pom Pussycats, is a 1981 American and Canadian comedy film directed by Mark Warren. The music was composed by Richard Cooper. The film stars John Vernon, Norman Fell, Robert Forster, Thom Haverstock, Terry Swiednicki and Keith Brown in the lead roles.

== Cast ==
- John Vernon
- Norman Fell
- Robert Forster
- Thom Haverstock
- Terry Swiednicki
- Keith Brown
- Christine Cattell
- Lisa Schwartz
- Paul Backewich
- Anthony Sherwood
- Matt Birman
- Katherine Trowell
