= Sharon Lawrence =

American actress (born 1961)

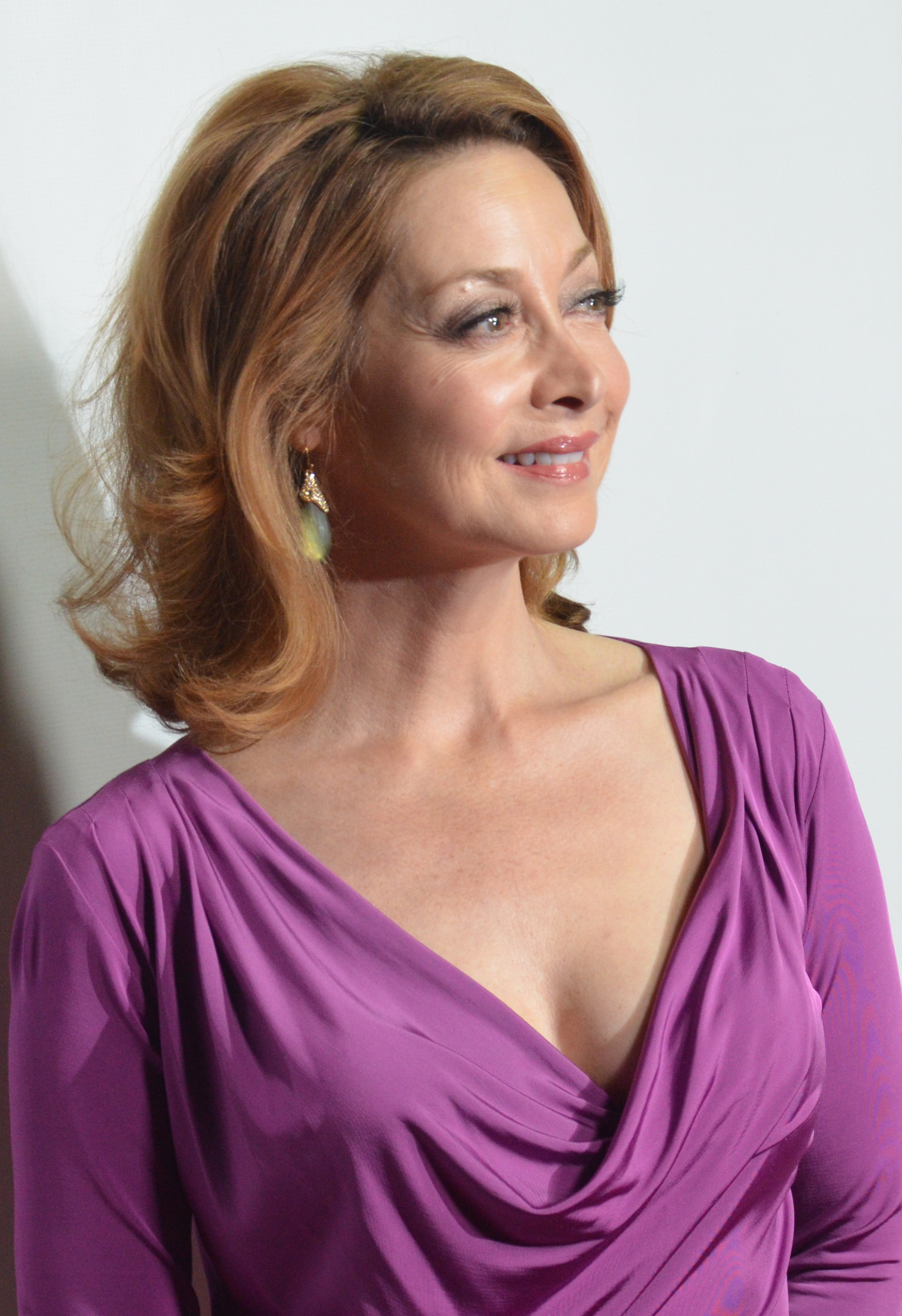
- Lawrence in 2013
- Born: Sharon Elizabeth Lawrence; June 29, 1961 (age 65); Charlotte, North Carolina, U.S.
- Education: University of North Carolina at Chapel Hill (BA)
- Occupation: Actress
- Years active: 1987–present
- Known for: NYPD Blue; Fired Up; Ladies Man; The 37's
- Spouse: Tom Apostle (m. 2002)

Sharon Elizabeth Lawrence (born June 29, 1961) is an American actress. From 1993 to 1999, she starred as Sylvia Costas in the ABC drama series, NYPD Blue. The role garnered her three Primetime Emmy Award nominations for Outstanding Supporting Actress in a Drama Series, Screen Actors Guild Award for Outstanding Performance by a Female Actor in a Drama Series, and Satellite Award for Best Actress – Television Series Drama. She received three additional Emmy Awards nominations for her later television performances.

After her NYPD Blue breakthrough, Lawrence starred in the sitcoms Fired Up (1997–1998) and Ladies Man (1999–2001). she starred in the CBS supernatural drama Wolf Lake in 2001, and the CW teen drama Hidden Palms in 2007. Lawrence had notable recurring performances in Desperate Housewives, Drop Dead Diva, Rizzoli & Isles, The Ranch, Shameless and Queen Sugar. Her film credits include Gossip (2000), Middle of Nowhere (2012) and Solace (2015). In 2021, she starred in the Paramount+ neo-Western series, Joe Pickett.

== Early life and education ==
Lawrence was born in Charlotte, North Carolina. She moved from Charlotte to Raleigh in her junior year of high school and graduated from Needham B. Broughton High School. She attended the University of North Carolina at Chapel Hill and graduated with a Bachelor of Arts degree in journalism in 1983.

== Career ==
Lawrence began her acting career on Broadway in the 1987 revival of Cabaret. In 1990, she performed in Fiddler on the Roof. She appeared in a number of television movies and series in the 1990s, like Cheers and Star Trek: Voyager. In 1993 she was cast as Assistant District Attorney Sylvia Costas in the ABC police drama series NYPD Blue created by Steven Bochco. Her consistently praised performance earned the actress three Primetime Emmy Award for Outstanding Supporting Actress in a Drama Series nominations from 1993 to 1996, and the Screen Actors Guild Award for Outstanding Performance by a Female Actor in a Drama Series in 1996. In 1996 she left the show for her own comedy series Fired Up on NBC. The series was canceled after two seasons. She later returned to NYPD Blue as a regular, and left the show in 1999, after her character was killed.

Lawrence starred with Betty White and Alfred Molina on the short-lived sitcom Ladies Man from 1999 to 2001. She played Velma Kelly in the Broadway musical Chicago in 2000. She also had a series regular role on the CBS supernatural drama Wolf Lake from 2001 to 2002. In film, she co-starred in Gossip (2000), Little Black Book (2004), and The Alibi (2006).

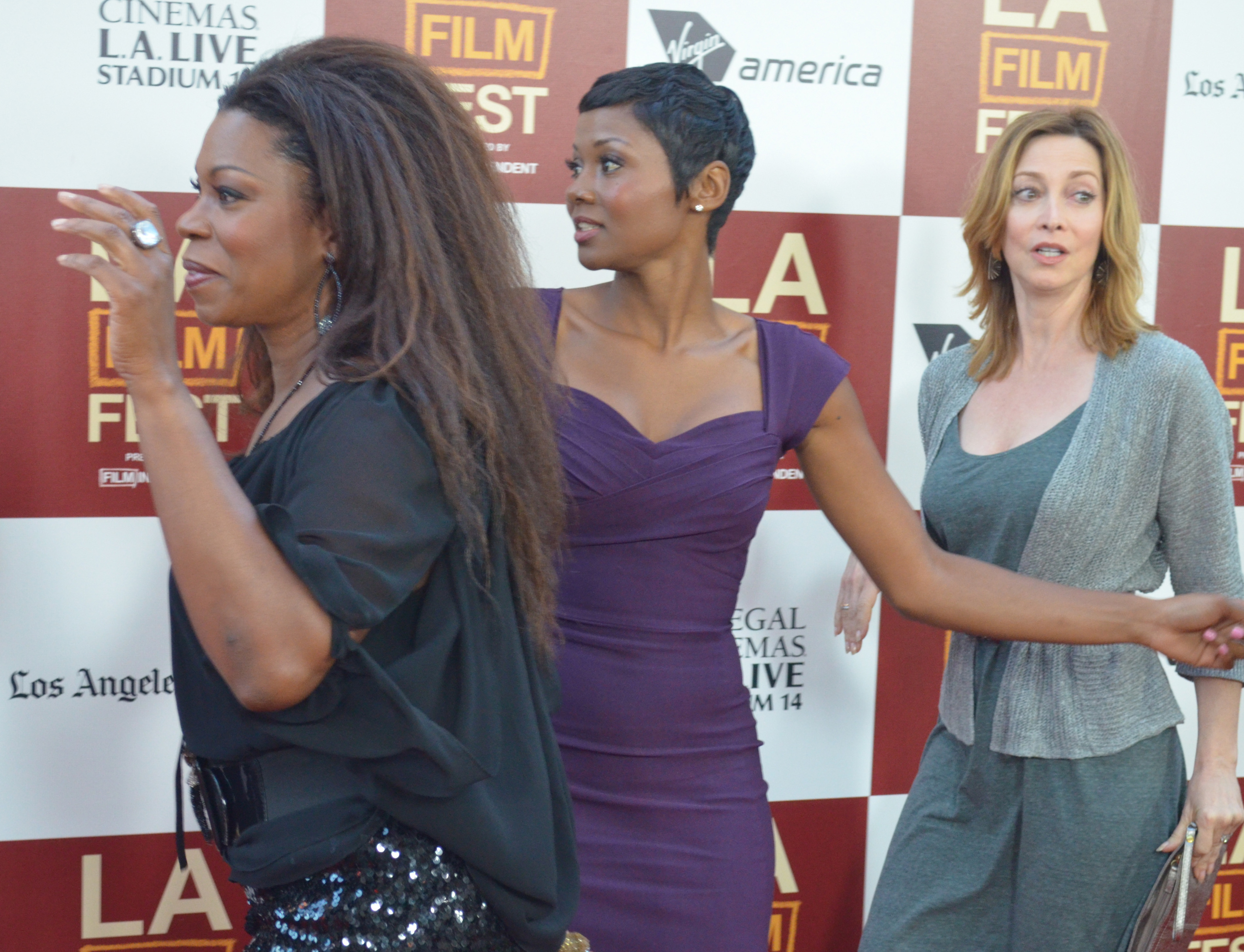
Lawrence with Lorraine Toussaint and Emayatzy Corinealdi at event of Middle of Nowhere in 2012

Lawrence guest starred on many television dramas and sitcoms in the 2000s. She played Maisy Gibbons, a housewife/prostitute in season one of Desperate Housewives. She also appeared in Law & Order: Special Victims Unit, Boston Legal, Monk, Curb Your Enthusiasm, The Mentalist, and Body of Proof. She starred in the TV movie Atomic Twister as Corrine McGuire. She had a regular role on the short-lived CW teenage drama series Hidden Palms (2008), as Tess Wiatt, and was seen in the Canadian cable television drama The Line in 2009.

In 2009, Lawrence was nominated for the Emmy Award for Outstanding Guest Actress in a Drama Series for her portrayal as Izzie Stevens' mother on Grey's Anatomy. In April 2010, Lawrence joined Josh Schwartz's CBS pilot Hitched. In October 2010, she began a recurring role on One Tree Hill as Sylvia Baker, the mother of Julian Baker (Austin Nichols) who comes to Tree Hill from Los Angeles to plan the upcoming wedding of Julian and Brooke Davis (Sophia Bush). She also played the lead character mother in a Lifetime comedy-drama Drop Dead Diva from 2009 to 2013. Also, she played the birth mother of Dr. Maura Isles (Sasha Alexander) in the TNT television series Rizzoli & Isles, although in real life the actresses are only 12 years apart. In recent years, Lawrence has starred in several independent films. In 2013 she was cast in Chris Carter's thriller drama series The After. The show was set to premiere on Amazon Studios in 2014. Amazon canceled the series before its premiere on January 5, 2015. In March 2015, Lawrence was cast in the ABC comedy-drama pilot Mix.

In 2017, Lawrence starred in the CBS short-lived comedy series Me, Myself and I. The show premiered September 25 but aired only six episodes before the network pulled it from the schedule due to low ratings. Also in 2017, she had a recurring role as Dawn-Lyen Gardner's character mother in the Oprah Winfrey Network drama series Queen Sugar and co-starred opposite Sam Elliott in the second season of Netflix comedy The Ranch. From 2016 to 2019 she had a recurring role as a real estate mogul Margo Mierzejewski in the Showtime comedy-drama series Shameless. Lawrence later had a recurring role as Laura Van Kirk on The CW prime time soap opera Dynasty starting in 2018, and as Louise Garbeau on the Showtime comedy series On Becoming a God in Central Florida in 2019.

In 2021, Lawrence had recurring roles in Punky Brewster and Rebel. She later starred in the Paramount+ neo-Western series, Joe Pickett. In 2026, she will star as M'Lynn in Steel Magnolias at PlayMakers Repertory Company.

== Personal life ==
In 2002, Lawrence married Tom Apostle. Their wedding was held at the Greek Orthodox church Saint Sophia, the same Los Angeles church in which her character, Sylvia Costas, in NYPD Blue married Detective Andy Sipowicz.

Lawrence has played on the World Poker Tour in the Hollywood Home and performed in benefits for the Alzheimer's Association in Los Angeles called Night at Sardi's and the What A Pair show for the John Wayne Breast Cancer Center.

== Filmography ==
=== Film ===
Year	Title	Role	Notes
1994	Bloodfist V: Human Target	Jewelry Store Clerk	
1994	In the Line of Duty: The Price of Vengeance	Unknown	Television film
1994	Someone She Knows	Sharon	Television film
1994	The Shaggy Dog	Beth Daniels	Television film
1995	The Face on the Milk Carton	Sada Sands	Television film
1995	The Heidi Chronicles	Jill	Television film
1995	Degree of Guilt	Mary Carelli	Television film
1996	A Friend's Betrayal	Nina Talbert	Television film
1996	Victim of the Haunt: The Uninvited	Pattie Johnson	Television film
1997	Five Desperate Hours	Clair Ballard	Television film
1997	The Only Thrill	Joleen Quillet	Television film
1999	Blue Moon	Cass Medieros	Television film
1999	Aftershock: Earthquake in New York	Dori Thorell	Television film
2000	Gossip	Detective Kelly	
2002	Atomic Twister	Corrine Maguire	Television film
2003	Word of Honor	Marcy McClure Tyson	Television film
2003	Fly Cherry	Cherry's mom	Short film
2004	Little Black Book	Stacy's mom	
2004	D-Minus	Susan	Short film
2005	Nearing Grace	Mrs. Ash	Uncredited
2005	I?	Karen	Short Film
2006	Augusta, Gone	Martha Tod Dudman	Television film
2006	The Alibi	Judith Hatch	
2006	Fool Me Once	Maureen	Short film
2011	Talker	Mary	Short film
2011	The Perfect Family	Agnes Dunn	
2012	Middle of Nowhere	Fraine	
2012	The Nuclear Family	Karen	Television film
2012	iVOTE	Marni	Short film
2012	The Visit	Ginny (mother of Diana)	Short film
2013	Jimmy	Judge Robinson	
2014	Born to Race 2: Fast Track	Mrs. Dalton	
2014	Thinspiration	Dr. Klein	Television film
2014	Grace.	Sonia	
2014	Una Vida: A Fable Of Music and the Mind	Angela Cruz	
2014	Somebody's Mother	Alice	Short film
2014	The Bridge Partner	Olivia Korhonen	Short film
2015	Solace	Mrs. Ellis	
2015	If I Could Tell You	Sara Linda	Short film
2016	Hearts of Christmas	Alice Shelby	Television film
2017	Deidra & Laney Rob a Train	Veronica	
2017	Anabolic Life	Katherine Stenson	
2017	Home	Margaret Sullivan	Short film
2017	Penny & Paul	Barb	Voice, short film
2018	Poinsettias for Christmas	Katherine Palmer	Television film
2019	Merry & Bright	Joy Merriwether	Television film
2020	The Lost Husband	Marsha	
2020	A Small Family Affair	Lorraine Heller	Short film
2020	Brothers		Short film
2020	The Christmas House	Phylis	Television film
2021	The Christmas House 2: Deck Those Halls	Phylis	Television film
2021	Grave Intentions	Olivia Korhonen	

=== Television ===
Year	Title	Role	Notes
1992	Civil Wars	Norma Helmutz	Episode: "Drone of Arc"
1993	Beverly Hills, 90210	Paulette	Episode: "Parental Guidance Recommended"
1993	Cheers	Rachel	Episode: "The Guy Can't Help It"
1993–1999	NYPD Blue	Sylvia Costas	Series regular; 99 episodes
1995	Star Trek: Voyager	Amelia Earhart	Episode: "The 37's"
1996	Caroline in the City	Maddie	Episode: "Caroline and the Proposal"
1997	Superman: The Animated Series	Maxima	Voice, episode: "Warrior Queen"
1997–1998	Fired Up	Gwen Leonard	Series regular; 28 episodes; Also executive producer
1999–2001	Ladies Man	Donna Stiles	Series regular; 30 episodes
2001–2002	Wolf Lake	Vivian Cates	Series regular; 9 episodes
2002	Philly	Tabitha Davenport	2 episodes
2002	Law & Order: Special Victims Unit	Maggie Peterson	Episode: "Chameleon"
2004	Judging Amy	Andrea Adelstein	Episode: "Predictive Neglect"
2004	Boston Legal	Judge Rita Sharpley	Episode: "Head Cases"
2004–2005	Desperate Housewives	Maisy Gibbons	3 episodes
2006–2008	Monk	Linda Fusco	4 episodes
2007	Hidden Palms	Tess Wiatt	Series regular; 8 episodes
2008–2009	The Line	Jayne	Series regular; 15 episodes
2008	Dirt	Cassie Hope	Episode: "God Bless the Child"
2008	The Capture of the Green River Killer	Fiona Remus	Miniseries
2008	The Prince of Motor City	Dorothy Riley	TV pilot
2008–2009	Privileged	Shelby Smith	3 episodes
2008–2009	Buzz	Alexis Henson	Web series
2009	Ghost Whisperer	Elena Bancroff	Episode: "Life on the Line"
2009	Grey's Anatomy	Robbie Stevens	Episode: "No Good at Saying Sorry (One More Chance)"
2009	Curb Your Enthusiasm	Dr. Trundle	Episode: "Vehicular Fellatio"
2009	Community	Doreen	Episode: "Politics of Human Sexuality"
2009–2013	Drop Dead Diva	Bobbie Dobkins	6 episodes
2010	The Mentalist	Melba Walker Shannon	Episode: "Bleeding Heart"
2010	Hitched	Judy Reynolds	TV pilot
2010	Blue Belle	Judy	Web series; 2 episodes
2010–2011	One Tree Hill	Sylvia Baker	6 episodes
2011	The Glades	Georgia Lancer	Episode: "Moonlighting"
2011	American Dad!	Scarlett Reynolds	Voice, episode: "The Scarlett Getter"
2012	BlackBoxTV	Debrah Stratford	Episode: "Silverwood: Red Ink"
2012–2016	Rizzoli & Isles	Dr. Hope Martin	6 episodes
2013	Body of Proof	Julia Stone	Episode: "Committed"
2014	The After	Francis	TV pilot
2014	Matador	Emily Taft	2 episodes
2014	Hell's Kitchen	Herself	Guest diner; episode: "Winner Chosen"
2015	Mix	Stella Ruiz	TV pilot
2015	Blunt Talk	Sophie	Episode: "All My Relationships End in Pain"
2016	Game of Silence	Diana Stockman	6 episodes
2016	Devious Maids	Lori	Episode: "Grime and Punishment"
2016–2019	Shameless	Margo Mierzejewski	7 episodes
2016	I Like You Just the Way I Am	Debbie	Season 1
2016	Blue Bloods	Christine Sanders	Episode: "The One That Got Away"
2017	The Last Tycoon	Frances Goldwyn	3 episodes
2017–2018	Me, Myself & I	Eleanor	6 episodes
2017	The Ranch	Brenda Sanders	7 episodes
2017	Queen Sugar	Lorna Prescott	3 episodes
2018	How to Get Away with Murder	Ingrid Egan	Episode: "Lahey v. Commonwealth of Pennsylvania"
2018–2021	Dynasty	Laura Van Kirk	8 episodes
2019–2020	Criminal Minds	Roberta Lynch	3 episodes
2019	On Becoming a God in Central Florida	Louise Garbeau	5 episodes
2020	Home Before Dark	Carol Collins	4 episodes
2020	L.A.'s Finest	Gloria Walker	2 episodes
2020	The Gaze: No Homo	Miranda Cryer	Web series, 6 episodes
2021	Punky Brewster	Susan	3 episodes
2021	Rebel	Angela Foyer	6 episodes
2021–2023	Joe Pickett	Missy	20 episodes
2024	Walker	Joanna	2 episodes

== Awards and nominations ==
List of awards and nominations
Year	Award	Category	Film	Result
1994	Primetime Emmy Award	Outstanding Supporting Actress in a Drama Series	NYPD Blue	Nominated
1995	Screen Actors Guild Award	Outstanding Performance by an Ensemble in a Drama Series	NYPD Blue	Won
1995	Primetime Emmy Award	Outstanding Supporting Actress in a Drama Series	NYPD Blue	Nominated
1996	Screen Actors Guild Award	Outstanding Performance by a Female Actor in a Drama Series	NYPD Blue	Nominated
1996	Screen Actors Guild Award	Outstanding Performance by an Ensemble in a Drama Series	NYPD Blue	Nominated
1996	Primetime Emmy Award	Outstanding Supporting Actress in a Drama Series	NYPD Blue	Nominated
1997	Screen Actors Guild Award	Outstanding Performance by an Ensemble in a Drama Series	NYPD Blue	Nominated
1998	Viewers for Quality Television Award	Best Recurring Player	NYPD Blue	Nominated
1999	Screen Actors Guild Award	Outstanding Performance by an Ensemble in a Drama Series	NYPD Blue	Nominated
1999	Satellite Award	Best Actress – Television Series Drama	NYPD Blue	Nominated
2007	Method Fest Independent Film Festival	Best Actress	Fool Me Once	Won
2007	Prism Award	Best Performance in a TV-Movie	Augusta, Gone	Nominated
2009	Primetime Emmy Award	Outstanding Guest Actress in a Drama Series	Grey's Anatomy	Nominated
2013	Black Reel Award	Best Ensemble	Middle of Nowhere	Nominated
2016	Winter Film Award	Best Actress	The Bridge Partner	Nominated
2017	Orlando Film Festival	Best Supporting Performance	Anabolic Life	Nominated
2017	USA Film Festival	Outstanding Performance Award	Home	Won
2021	Daytime Emmy Award	Outstanding Lead Actress in a Daytime Fiction Program	The Gaze: No Homo	Nominated
2022	Children's and Family Emmy Awards	Outstanding Guest Performance	Punky Brewster	Nominated
