= Bullet for a Badman =

1964 film

- Film poster
- Directed by: R. G. Springsteen
- Screenplay by: Mary Willingham; Willard Willingham
- Based on: Renegade Posse; 1958 novel by Marvin H. Albert
- Produced by: Gordon Kay
- Starring: Audie Murphy; Darren McGavin
- Cinematography: Joseph Biroc
- Edited by: Russell F. Schoengarth
- Music by: Frank Skinner
- Color process: Eastmancolor
- Production company: Universal Pictures
- Distributed by: Universal Pictures
- Release date: September 1, 1964
- Running time: 80 minutes
- Country: United States
- Language: English
- Budget: $500,000

Bullet for a Badman is a 1964 American Western film directed by R. G. Springsteen and starring Audie Murphy and Darren McGavin. The film is based on the 1958 novel Renegade Posse by Marvin H. Albert. The film was shot between October and November 1963 in Zion National Park and Snow Canyon State Park in Utah.

== Plot ==
Sam Ward and Logan Keliher were once brothers in arms in the Texas Rangers. When both left the force, Ward turned outlaw and is angry at Keliher for marrying his former wife and adopting his child while Ward was imprisoned for his crimes. Ward escapes from prison and forms a gang to rob a bank in Keliher's town, and Ward plans to kill Keliher after the robbery. Keliher foils the robbery and Ward is the only survivor from his gang. Ward escapes with the loot but is wounded by Keliher, who joins a posse and uses his knowledge of Ward's ways to locate him.

When Ward is captured and the bank money is recovered, several members of the posse debate whether they should kill Ward and his girlfriend Lottie and keep the bank money for themselves. Their plans are interrupted by an Apache war party.

== Cast ==
- Audie Murphy as Logan Keliher
- Darren McGavin as Sam Ward
- Ruta Lee as Lottie
- Beverley Owen as Susan
- Skip Homeier as Pink
- George Tobias as Diggs
- Alan Hale Jr. as Leach (as Alan Hale)
- Berkeley Harris as Jeff
- Edward Platt as Tucker
- Kevin Tate as Sammy
- Cece Whitney as Goldie
- Mort Mills as Ira Snow
- Ray Teal as the Sweeper
- Bob Steele as the Sheriff (uncredited)
- Aline Towne as the Saloon Girl (uncredited)

== Production ==
Parts of the film were shot at the Virgin River in Zion National Park and Snow Canyon in Utah.

== See also ==
- List of American films of 1964
