= Dave Zeltserman =

American novelist

Dave Zeltserman is an American novelist, born in Boston, Massachusetts on May 23, 1959. He has published noir, mystery, thriller, and horror novels, including Small Crimes (2008) and Pariah (2009). He won both the Shamus and Derringer awards for his novelette Julius Katz in 2010. He also writes Morris Brick serial killer thrillers under the pseudonym Jacob Stone. His novel Small Crimes was made into a 2017 Netflix Original film of the same title starring Nikolaj Coster-Waldau.

== Novels ==
- Fast Lane (2004)
- Bad Thoughts (2007)
- Small Crimes (2008), selected by NPR as one of the 5 best crime and mystery novels of 2008 and The Washington Post as one of the best books of the year.
- Bad Karma (2009)
- Pariah (2009), selected by The Washington Post as one of the best books of 2009.
- Killer (2010)
- The Caretaker of Lorne Field (2010), shortlisted by ALA for best horror novel of 2010 and Black Quill Nominee for Best Dark Genre novel of 2010.
- Outsourced (2011)
- Blood Crimes (2011)
- Dying Memories (2011)
- Julius Katz and Archie (2011)
- A Killer's Essence (2011)
- Monster: A novel of Frankenstein (2012), selected by Booklist for their 2013 list of top 10 horror novels and WBUR for their favorite novels of 2012
- The Boy Who Killed Demons (2014)
- The Interloper (2014)
- Deranged (written as Jacob Stone, 2017)
- Crazed (written as Jacob Stone, 2017)
- Malicious (written as Jacob Stone, 2018)
- Husk (2018)
- Cruel (written as Jacob Stone, 2018)
- Unleashed (written as Jacob Stone, 2019)
- The Tenth Wish (2019)
- Everybody Lies in Hell (2019)
- Trust Nothing (2025)
- Alles Endet Hier (2026)

== Awards ==
- Pariah 2009 New England Book Festival Award
- Julius Katz 2010 Shamus Award
- Julius Katz 2010 Derringer Award
- Archie's Been Framed 2010 EQMM Readers Choice Award
- Archie Solves the Case 2013 EQMM Readers Choice Award
- Cramer in Trouble 2017 3rd place EQMM Readers Choice Award
- "Julius Katz Draws a Straight Flush" 2026 Edgar Award for Best Short Story
