= Burt Douglas =

American film, stage and television actor

- Born: Burton Archibald Douglas; November 21, 1930; Denver, Colorado, U.S.
- Died: July 1, 2000 (aged 69); Denver, Colorado, U.S.
- Education: University of Colorado
- Occupations: Film, stage and television actor
- Years active: 1957–1992

Burt Archibald Douglas (November 21, 1930 – July 1, 2000) was an American film, stage and television actor.

== Life and career ==
Douglas was born in Denver, Colorado, and graduated from the University of Colorado. When he saw the play The Heiress, which starred Ruth Gordon and Whitfield Connor, he decided to take the summer stock theater program.

Douglas began his film career in 1957, appearing in the film House of Numbers. In the same year, he also appeared in the television series The Thin Man. Douglas had previously worked at the Elitch Gardens. He performed in over 100 stage plays.

In 1958, Douglas appeared in the films Handle with Care, Party Girl, High School Confidential and The Law and Jake Wade. He also had a role in the film Imitation General. Douglas guest-starred in television programs including Gunsmoke, Bonanza, Barnaby Jones, Death Valley Days, Rawhide, Lawman, The Fugitive, Peter Gunn, The Virginian and 12 O'Clock High. He played roles in soap operas including as Ron Christopher in The Edge of Night, and also portrayed Jim Fisk from 1965 and Sam Monroe from 1974 to 1975 in Days of Our Lives.

== Death ==
Douglas died on July 1, 2000, at the age of 69.

== Television ==
1959	LAWMAN	Ben Adams	Season 1, episode 32 "The Return "
1960	Wanted, dead or alive	Stacy Lenz	Season 3 episode 12, "The choice"
1961	Rawhide	Webb Church	S3:E17, "Incident of the New Start"
1961	Rawhide	Brad Lyons	S4:E4, "Judgement at Hondo Seco"
1965	Rawhide	Tom Cowan	S7:E24, "The Empty Sleeve"
