= Rough Night in Jericho (film) =

1967 film by Arnold Laven

- Original theatrical poster
- Directed by: Arnold Laven
- Screenplay by: Sydney Boehm; Marvin H. Albert
- Based on: The Man in Black; 1965 novel by Marvin H. Albert
- Produced by: Martin Rackin
- Starring: Dean Martin; George Peppard; Jean Simmons
- Cinematography: Russell Metty
- Edited by: Ted J. Kent
- Music by: Don Costa
- Production company: Martin Rackin Productions
- Distributed by: Universal Pictures
- Release date: August 1, 1967
- Running time: 104 minutes
- Country: United States
- Language: English
- Box office: $1,750,000 (US/ Canada)

Rough Night in Jericho is a 1967 American Western film in Techniscope, directed by Arnold Laven and starring Dean Martin, George Peppard and Jean Simmons. The picture was based on the novel The Man in Black, written in 1965 by Marvin H. Albert, who also co-wrote the screenplay. The supporting cast includes John McIntire and Slim Pickens. Rough Night in Jericho is the only film in which Dean Martin portrayed the villain.

== Plot ==
A stagecoach bound for the town of Jericho is ambushed by Alex Flood, a lawman gone bad. Sharpshooting from a safe distance, Flood wounds the coach's driver, Ben Hickman, who is brought to town by the only passenger, a gambler named Dolan.

Hickman is a former Santa Fe lawman and Dolan was once his deputy. They now are partners in the stage line with Molly Lang, whom they have come to Jericho to meet. She was once Flood's lover when he came to Jericho to restore law and order, but now she hates the man who has seized power in the town.

Flood forms a lynch mob that hangs a man who dared confront one of his gang, then dynamites the home of general store owner Ryan, another townsman who tried to organize a secret meeting. While the wounded Hickman recovers from the gunshot, Dolan takes a liking to Molly and decides to help her when Flood's men try to take over her stagecoach line. He gets into a violent fight with Yarbrough, one of Flood's men.

Dolan begins to create havoc in Flood's empire, stealing his cattle and causing explosions at Flood's ranch house, mill and gold mine. He is assisted by Hickman, Molly, Ryan and by Jace, the town's former deputy. Flood returns to Jericho seeking revenge. He shoots Hickman in the back, killing him. Dolan sets out after Flood for a final showdown in the hills. After Flood shoots Dolan in the arm, Dolan manages to throw his knife at Flood and kill him.

== Cast ==
- Dean Martin as Alex Flood
- George Peppard as Dolan
- Jean Simmons as Molly Lang
- John McIntire as Ben Hickman
- Slim Pickens as Yarbrough
- Don Galloway as Jace
- Brad Weston as Torrey
- Richard O'Brien as Frank Ryan
- Carol Andreson as Claire
- Steve Sandor as Simms
- Warren Vanders as Harvey
- John Napier as McGivern

== Production ==
Parts of the film were shot in Glen Canyon, Kanab Canyon, Paria and the Gap in Utah.

== Reception ==
Peppard disliked the film.
