= Duel at Diablo =

1966 film by Ralph Nelson

- Original film poster by Frank McCarthy
- Directed by: Ralph Nelson
- Screenplay by: Marvin H. Albert; Michael M. Grilikhes
- Based on: Apache Rising; 1957 novel by Marvin H. Albert
- Produced by: Fred Engel; Ralph Nelson
- Starring: James Garner; Sidney Poitier; Bill Travers; Bibi Andersson; Dennis Weaver
- Cinematography: Charles F. Wheeler
- Edited by: Fredric Steinkamp
- Music by: Neal Hefti
- Distributed by: United Artists
- Release date: June 15, 1966
- Running time: 103 minutes
- Country: United States
- Language: English
- Box office: $1,500,000 (US/ Canada)

Duel at Diablo is a 1966 American Western film directed by Ralph Nelson starring James Garner and Sidney Poitier. It is based on Marvin H. Albert's 1957 novel Apache Rising. The production was shot on location in southern Utah.

The film was Garner's first Western after leaving the long-running TV series Maverick. Poitier had never been in a Western and was re-teaming with Nelson who directed Lilies of the Field. The supporting cast includes Bibi Andersson, Bill Travers, Dennis Weaver and John Hoyt. The musical score was composed by Neal Hefti.

== Plot ==
The film opens in the desert on the remains of a man who had been roasted to death by Apaches. Frontier scout Jess Remsberg is disgusted by the scene but is quickly distracted by a woman riding an exhausted horse. Two Apaches chase after the woman. Remsberg fights them off and rescues the woman, Ellen Grange. Her freighter husband, Willard Grange, is not pleased to have her back home. She had previously been rescued from the Apaches and chosen to return to them.

Jess meets his friend Lt. "Scotty" McAllister, an experienced and ambitious army lieutenant. McAllister produces the scalp of Jess' Comanche wife. He tells a horrified Jess that the marshal at Fort Concho has information about what happened to her.

Jess tells McAllister that the burned man in the desert was his scout. In need of a replacement, McAllister hires Jess. McAllister has to resupply Fort Concho with horses and supplies. His Army cavalry unit has twenty-five inexperienced soldiers. McAllister's horse breaker, Toller, is a veteran of the 10th Cavalry (the "Buffalo Soldiers"). Willard Grange is hauling freight along with McAllister's men.

A group of men try to rape Ellen, but Jess saves her again with Toller's help. Ellen rejoins the Apaches again, and Jess decides to go after her. While rescuing her, he discovers she went back to see her infant son. The baby's father was the deceased son of the Apache chief Chata (based on Chato). Jess helps Ellen abduct the child, and they catch up with McAllister's unit.

Chata ambushes the convoy, killing many of McAllister's men and destroying their food and water. McAllister is seriously wounded. Toller knows Apache tactics and helps organize the survivors' defense. McAllister hopes to find water and cover in Diablo Canyon. Jess agrees to go ahead to Fort Concho for help. He and Ellen get past the Apache siege by holding her baby aloft, knowing Chata will not risk harming his grandson.

The besieged unit makes it to the canyon. Jess' horse dies, but he gets to the fort. He finds the marshal and forces him to explain where he got the scalp. The marshal confesses he won it from Willard Grange in a poker game. Willard had killed an Apache woman in revenge for the tribe's abduction of Ellen.

Meanwhile, Willard is captured by the Apaches and is tied upside down over hot coals in the same manner as McAllister's scout. His screams are meant to terrorize his besieged companions. Ellen is heartbroken to hear him suffering.

Jess races to the canyon with army reinforcements just in time to save the last four survivors, including Toller and Ellen. Jess finds Willard barely alive. He begs to be put out of his misery. Jess gives him his pistol, and Willard kills himself.

The Apaches are disarmed and rounded up to be returned to a reservation. Chata is allowed a final embrace of his grandson. As the detachment moves out, Toller stands by the graves of the dead soldiers, including McAllister.

== Cast ==
- James Garner as Jess Remsberg
- Sidney Poitier as Toller, Contract Horse Dealer
- Bibi Andersson as Ellen Grange
- Dennis Weaver as Willard Grange
- Bill Travers as Lieutenant Scotty McAllister
- John Hubbard as Major Novak, Fort Creel's C.O.
- John Hoyt as Chata
- William Redfield as Sergeant Ferguson
- Bill Hart as Corporal Harrington
- Eddie Little Sky as Alchise
- John Crawford as Clay Dean
- Jeff Cooper as Trooper Casey
- Ralph Bahnsen as Trooper Nyles
- Ralph Nelson as Col. Foster

== Production ==
Parts of the film were shot in Paria, Kanab Canyon, Tom's Canyon, Glen Canyon, Vermilion Cliffs, White Cliffs, and Kaibab National Forest in Utah.The film's premiere highlighted its filming locations by taking the media on a bus tour from Page, Arizona to Zion National Park and then to Salt Lake City.

Toller is not African-American in the source novel. Sidney Poitier had been getting ever more prominent roles and was regularly billed second in films like Duel at Diablo and The Bedford Incident. Poitier said he took the role because he wanted to expand awareness of the "Negro contribution to the building of the West" and to "give a hero imagery to Negro children to encourage them to love Westerns". Nelson and Poitier based Toller on the descriptions in The Negro Cowboy, an academic book that came out during production.

The film is notably more violent than its predecessors in the genre. Previous Westerns had referenced the Native American practice of roasting people alive, but Duel at Diablo begins with a closeup of two burned victims. It also climaxes with Dennis Weaver tied to a wagon wheel and roasted slowly over hot coals, an impermissibly graphic visual in earlier times. However, the Production Code Administration's only concern with the film was that the horses were treated humanely. It had considerably loosened its standards for onscreen violence by the late 60s.

== Reception ==
Robert Alden wrote a positive review in The New York Times, "Much of it is raw and ugly, yet it is a film that will grip you, a film that will have a shattering effect by the time you go back out into the street." The Monthly Film Bulletin called it "a tough action-packed Western of the old school."

In Cue, William Wolf howled, "Sidney Poitier is the only one who manages to stylishly survive the implausible doings in this mixed up action stew...It is highly doubtful whether audiences can survive as well." In a 2.5-star review, New York Daily News gave the faint praise, "better than the average disaster", and mused that Norman's superb editing and cinematography distracted from the screenplay. "The actors appear grimly determined to get away with the script as written...each new line of dialogue means trouble." The Radio Times felt "it doesn't quite succeed, partly because the eclectic casting (including Swede Bibi Andersson and Brit Bill Travers) gets in the way of the authenticity."

Philip Hartung wrote that the plot "is more complicated than usual. And two of its complications have to do with miscegenation...But more startling than the miscegenation themes (which have been used before in westerns) is the presence of Sidney Poitier...He gives another of his fine performances and his color is never mentioned." Clifford Mason sniffed that Poitier "did little more than hold James Garner's hat and this after he had won the Academy Award. What white romantic actor would take a part like that?"

The success of Support Your Local Sheriff! in 1969 prompted United Artists to re-release Duel at Diablo.

Duel at Diablo is sometimes seen as an early example of American filmmakers adopting traits of the spaghetti western, with its heightened violence, desert setting, and Hefti's guitar-laden score. Even the title sequence, with its bloody knife carving up the title cards is reminiscent of the nascent genre.

== See also ==
- List of American films of 1966
