= Rockne Tarkington =

American actor

- Rockne Tarkington in The Andy Griffith Show 1967
- Born: William Rockne Tarkington; July 15, 1931; Junction City, Kansas, United States
- Died: April 5, 2015 (aged 83); Colorado Springs, Colorado, United States
- Occupation: Actor
- Years active: 1963–1995
- Height: 1.96 m (6 ft 5 in)
- Spouse(s): Joan Blackman (m. 1968; div. 1970) Iva Anita Poree (m. 1982)
- Children: 2 sons

William Rockne Tarkington (July 15, 1931 – April 5, 2015) was an American stage, film and television actor.

== Career ==
Born in Junction City, Kansas, Tarkington began his career as a stage actor, and made the transition to television with guest appearances in episodes of The Alfred Hitchcock Hour, Kraft Suspense Theatre, The Man from U.N.C.L.E., Ben Casey, Mission: Impossible, Bewitched, and many others. Tarkington was also the first credited black actor to appear on The Andy Griffith Show.

Tarkington made recurring appearances on Tarzan (as Young Chief / Ramahit / Ahmid / Rao) and starred as Elihu Morgan on Danger Island on Hanna-Barbera's Banana Splits Adventure Hour. He also played "Too Mean" Malone on the 1983–84 season of Matt Houston and made appearances in episodes of Bearcats!, MacGyver, Baretta and other shows in the 1970s and 1980s.

As a film actor, Tarkington played the title role in the blaxploitation picture Black Samson (1974), and co-starred with Richard X. Slattery in The No Mercy Man (1973) and Zebra Force (1976). He also appeared in films such as Soldier in the Rain (1963); Clarence, the Cross-Eyed Lion (1965); The Great White Hope (1970); Beware! The Blob (1972), Melinda (1972); The Baltimore Bullet (1980); National Lampoon's Movie Madness (1983); The Ice Pirates (1984), Uphill All the Way (1986) and Death Before Dishonor (1987), and had parts in many television films.

Tarkington was the first choice to play the part of Williams in Enter the Dragon (1973), but just before the start of filming he was replaced by Jim Kelly.

== Personal life ==
Tarkington lived in Los Angeles for the majority of his career where he was married to fellow screen actor Joan Blackman from July 1968 to October 1970. In the 1990s he returned home to Kansas when his mother became ill. He eventually became a Mormon after seeing a television commercial for the Church of Jesus Christ of Latter-day Saints.

== Filmography ==
Year	Title	Role	Notes
1963	Soldier in the Rain	First Sergeant William Booth	
1965	Major Dundee	Jefferson	Uncredited
1965	Clarence, the Cross-Eyed Lion	Juma	
1965	Tell Me in the Sunlight	Rocky	
1968	PJ	Cato	Uncredited
1969	The Dream of Hamish Mose	Hamish Mose	Unreleased
1970	The Great White Hope	Rudy	
1972	Beware! The Blob	Deputy Williams	
1972	Melinda	"Tank"	
1973	The No Mercy Man	Prophet	
1973	Enter the Dragon	Williams	Unexpected Exit, Replaced by Jim Kelly
1974	Home Grown	Hank	
1974	Black Samson	Samson	
1974	Black Starlet	Ben	
1976	The Zebra Force	Earl Lovington	
1977	The Great Gundown	Sutton	
1980	The Baltimore Bullet	Gunner	
1982	National Lampoon's Movie Madness	Black Cop, 'Municipalians'	
1982	Showdown at Eagle Gap	"Enterprise" Jackson	
1984	The Ice Pirates	"Patch"	
1986	Uphill All the Way	Leon	
1987	Death Before Dishonor	"Jihad"	
1988	Under the Gun	Leon	
1989	Fists of Steel	Rijar	
1994	Wyatt Earp	Stable Hand	
1994	The Desperate Trail	Packo	
1995	Outlaws: The Legend of O.B. Taggart	Bartender	

=== Television ===
Year	Title	Role	Notes
1963	The Alfred Hitchcock Hour	Pete the Police Officer	Season 2 Episode 7: "Starring the Defense"
1964	Kraft Suspense Theatre	Henry	Season 1 Episode 12: "A Truce to Terror"
1964	The Great Adventure	Corporal Banks	Season 1 Episode 17: "The Special Courage of Captain Pratt"
1964	The Man from U.N.C.L.E.	Mr. Morgan	Season 1 Episode 4: "The Shark Affair"
1965	Bob Hope Presents the Chrysler Theatre	Sergeant Fanning	Season 2 Episode 12: "Exit from a Plane in Flight"
1966	Bob Hope Presents the Chrysler Theatre	Poet	Season 3 Episode 11: "After the Lion, Jackals"
1966	The Man from U.N.C.L.E.	Domestic	Season 2 Episode 22: "The Foreign Legion Affair"
1966	Bewitched	Tommy Carter	Season 2 Episode 21: "Fastest Gun on Madison Avenue"
1966	Ben Casey		1 episode
1966	Daktari		1 episode
1966	Tarzan	Rao	Season 1 Episode 1: "Eyes of the Lion"
1966	Tarzan	Rao	Season 1 Episode 3: "Leopard on the Loose"
1966	Tarzan	Rao	Season 1 Episode 4: "A Life for a Life"
1966	Tarzan	Rao	Season 1 Episode 7: "The Prodigal Puma"
1966	Tarzan	Ahmid	Season 1 Episode 12: "The Day of the Golden Lion"
1967	Tarzan	Ramahit	Season 2 Episode 2: "The Voice of the Elephant"
1967	Tarzan	Young Chief	Season 2 Episode 11: "Mountains of the Moon: Part 1"
1967	Tarzan	Young Chief	Season 2 Episode 12: "Mountains of the Moon: Part 2"
1967	The Andy Griffith Show	Flip Conroy	Season 7 Episode 26: "Opie's Piano Lesson"
1967	Mission: Impossible	Paul Giroux	Season 2 Episode 8: "The Money Machine"
1967	Cowboy in Africa	Jacob	Season 1 Episode 10: "Lake Sinclair"
1968	The High Chaparral	Sergeant Washburn	Season 1 Episode 22: "Ride the Savage Land"
1968–1969	Danger Island	Elihu Morgan	26 episodes
1968–1970	The Banana Splits	Elihu Morgan	10 episodes
1970	Marcus Welby, M.D.	Frank Davidson	Season 1 Episode 25: "Enid"
1971	Bearcats!	Lukas	Season 1 Episode 9: "Bitter Flats"
1973	Assignment Vienna	Alan Roberts	Season 1 Episode 8: "Soldier of Fortune"
1974	Police Story	Leonard Gardner	Season 1 Episode 11: "Chain of Command"
1975	Police Story	Andrew Carver	Season 2 Episode 18: "The Execution"
1975	Police Story	Stuckley	Season 3 Episode 7: "Test of Brotherhood"
1976	Police Story	Ripley	Season 3 Episode 21: "Officer Dooly"
1976	City of Angels	George	Season 1 Episode 7: "Palm Springs Answer"
1976	Big John, Little John	Magiconi	Season 1 Episode 13: "Abracadabra"
1977	Days of Our Lives	Kenny's Friend	4 Episodes: 2947, 2948, 2949, 2950
1978	Baretta	Captain Johnson	Season 4 Episode 17: "The Stone Conspiracy"
1978	Roll of Thunder, Hear My Cry	Morrison	Television film
1979	Charleston	Reverend Duchamp	Television film
1979	The Ordeal of Patty Hearst	Death Row	Television film
1979	Disaster on the Coastliner		Television film
1980	Tenspeed and Brown Shoe	Mucker	Season 1 Episode 9: "It's Easier to Pass an Elephant Through the Eye of a Needle Than a Bad Check in Bel Air"
1980	Roughnecks	Lenny Booker	Television film
1981	The Intruder Within	Mark	Television film
1982	Gavilan	Joe	Season 1 Episode 8: "Best Friend Money Can Buy"
1982	Matt Houston	'Too Mean' Malone	Season 1 Episode 4: "Killing Isn't Everything"
1983	Matt Houston	'Too Mean' Malone	Season 2 Episode 6: "Marilyn"
1983	Matt Houston	Too Mean Malone	Season 2 Episode 8: "China Doll"
1983	Women of San Quentin	Big William	Television film
1984	Matt Houston	Malone	Season 2 Episode 14: "Waltz of Death"
1984	Matt Houston	Too Mean Malone	Season 2 Episode 19: "Blood Ties"
1984	Matt Houston	Too Mean Malone	Season 2 Episode 20: "The Secret Admirer"
1984	Matt Houston	Malone	Season 3 Episode 6: "Return to Nam: Part 1"
1985	Hollywood Beat		Season 1 Episode 13: "Connections"
1985	Handsome Harry's	Tank	Television film
1986	The Redd Foxx Show	Earl	Season 1 Episode 13: "High Noon"
1987	MacGyver	Jules	Season 2 Episode 21: "D.O.A.: MacGyver"
1988	Ohara	Randall	Season 2 Episode 15: "X"
1992	Lucky Luke	Harp	Season 1 Episode 4: "Chi è Mr. Josephs?"
