= Monster Squad =

Television series

- Genre: Action; Adventure; Comedy horror Superhero
- Developed by: Stanley Ralph Ross
- Starring: Henry Polic II; Buck Kartalian; Michael Lane; Fred Grandy
- Composer: Richard La Salle
- Country of origin: United States
- Original language: English
- No. of episodes: 13

Production
- Executive producers: Willam P. D'Angelo; Harvey Bullock; Ray Allen
- Producer: Michael Mclean
- Running time: 30 minutes
- Production company: D'Angelo-Bullock-Allen Productions

Original release
- Network: NBC
- Release: September 11 – December 4, 1976

Monster Squad is a television series produced by D'Angelo-Bullock-Allen Productions that aired Saturday mornings on NBC from September 11, 1976, to September 3, 1977.

== Premise ==
The series stars Fred Grandy as Walt, a criminology student working as a night watchman at "Fred's Wax Museum". To pass the time, Walt built a prototype "Crime Computer" hidden in a large stone sarcophagus near an exhibit of legendary monsters. When Walt plugged in his computer, "oscillating vibrations" brought to life the wax statues of Dracula (Henry Polic II), the Wolfman (Buck Kartalian) – who here was named "Bruce W. Wolf" (with one episode revealing that the "W" stood for "Were") – and the Frankenstein Monster (Michael Lane), who was referred to as "Frank N. Stein" in the credits.

The monsters, wanting to make up for the misdeeds of their pasts, became superhero crimefighters who used their unique abilities to challenge and defeat various supervillains. In most episodes, Walt would send the monsters out to investigate crimes and fight the villains while monitoring the activities from the wax museum via the Crime Computer, presumably because his job required him to be at the wax museum at all times. Walt, however, would sometimes join the climactic battle with his comrades in some episodes and come to the rescue when needed.

Though the Squad are supposed to be wax statues, it often appears that they are something else entirely, as they apparently have all the memories of the monsters they are based on as well as their powers. The gentle giant Frank, for example, possessed superhuman strength and could smash through walls, while the dapper cloak-clad and fearsome-fanged Drac could turn into a bat, and the short and furry Bruce was a ferocious fighter who could climb up the sheer sides of buildings Spider-Man-style and had a super-sensitive sense of smell.

The Squad had their own customized black Monster Van, and each monster had a "utility belt" with a communicator device used to keep in touch with Walt, who had apparently created them for the monsters to use. Their CB-style codenames were "Chamber of Horrors" (Walt), "Nightflyer" (Drac), "Green Machine" (Frank) and "Furball" (Bruce).

The show was comparable to the 1960s Batman TV show; its creator Stanley Ralph Ross had been one of the main writers on that series. The villains were often exaggerated camp supervillains much like the ones on Batman in keeping with the "superhero" tone of the show, and were often played by familiar-faced guest stars of the time, like Alice Ghostley ("Queen Bee"), Marty Allen ("Lorenzo Musica"), Jonathan Harris ("the Astrologer"), Julie Newmar ("Ultra Witch"), Avery Schreiber ("the Weatherman") and Vito Scotti ("Albert/Alberta").

In several episodes, a statue of the Invisible Man can be seen in an alcove on the opposite side of the monsters' exhibit. It is never explained why this statue remains unaffected by the Crime Computer's oscillating vibrations.

== Cast ==
=== Main ===
- Fred Grandy – Walt
- Henry Polic II – Dracula
- Buck Kartalian – Bruce W. Wolf
- Michael Lane – Frank N. Stein

=== Recurring ===
- Mayor Goldwyn (portrayed by Edward Andrews)
- Officer McMacMac (portrayed by Paul Smith and Richard X. Slattery)

=== Others ===
- Man on Radio (portrayed by Colin Hamilton)
- Jackie Joey (portrayed by Stanley Ralph Ross)
- Chief Running Nose (portrayed by Sid Haig)
- Mimi Falters (portrayed by Caren Kaye)
- Farmer (portrayed by Frank Cady)
- Dandy Andy (portrayed by Johnny Brown)
- King Fooey (portrayed by Nathan Jung)
- Store Manager (portrayed by Patrick Campbell)
- Newscaster (portrayed by Mike Lawrence)
- Dr. Fishline (portrayed by John Alvin)

=== Villains ===
- Queen Bee (portrayed by Alice Ghostley): A bee-themed villainess who controls a swarm of killer bees.
  - Spelling Bee and Bumble Bee (portrayed by Hamilton Camp and Al Mancini): Queen Bee's henchmen
- Mr. Mephisto (portrayed by Barry Dennen): Creator of life-sized living dolls.
  - Baby Doll and Arlene Doll (portrayed by Cathy Worthington and Mindi Miller): Mr. Mephisto's hypnotic-eyed henchwomen
- The Tickler (portrayed by Ivor Francis): Sad-faced clown/criminal mastermind
  - Twitter and Snicker (portrayed by Al Stellone and Doug Stevenson): The Tickler's henchmen
- The Ringmaster (portrayed by Billy Curtis): Diminutive circus owner who holds an audience of children hostage as revenge against those who made fun of his size.
  - Sam Strongman and Bonnie Bon (portrayed by H.B. Haggerty and Simone Griffeth): The Ringmaster's henchmen
- Lorenzo Musica (portrayed by Marty Allen): A failed musician who robs a telethon so he can pay people to attend his concert.
  - Andante and Allegro (portrayed by Tom Sherohman and Michael McManus): Lorenzo Musica's henchmen
- No Face (portrayed by Sid Haig and Edward Andrews, although his actual voice was supplied by an uncredited third actor): A literally faceless master of disguise.
  - Pillage and Plunder (portrayed by Timothy Scott and David Proval): No Face's henchmen
- The Astrologer (portrayed by Jonathan Harris): A TV prognosticator planning to use an atomic bomb to make his prediction of an earthquake come true.
  - Castor and Pollux (portrayed by Sandy McPeak and James Gammon): The Astrologer's henchmen
- Ultra Witch (portrayed by Julie Newmar): A sexy sorceress who has made all the world's milk turn sour.
  - Toil and Trouble (portrayed by Richard Bakalyan and Joe E. Tata): Ultra Witch's henchmen
- The Wizard (portrayed by Arthur Malet): A Merlin-like magician miniaturizing monuments.
  - Mumbo and Jumbo (portrayed by Victor Paul and Mickey Morton): The Wizard's henchmen
- The Skull (portrayed by Geoffrey Lewis): A sinister scientist who revives a mummy as the first step in his plan to create an army of the evil dead.
  - Blue Tooth and The Mummy (portrayed by Peter Zapp and Pete Kellett): The Skull's henchmen
- The Weatherman (portrayed by Avery Schreiber): A would-be dictator causing blizzards in July.
  - Phoebe Snow and David Frost (portrayed by Cheryl Miller and Owen Orr): The Weatherman's henchmen
- Lawrence of Moravia (portrayed by Joseph Mascolo): Arabian billionaire who steals for fun rather than profit.
  - Fouad and Abdul (portrayed by Winston Roberts and Joe Tornatore): Lawrence of Moravia's henchmen
  - Night Watchman (portrayed by Whitney Rydbeck): Lawrence of Moravia's henchman
- Albert/Alberta (portrayed by Vito Scotti): A sideshow-style half-and-half hermaphrodite using a laser to melt the polar ice cap.
  - Half-Wit and Half-Nelson (portrayed by Raymond Singer and Phil Diskin): Albert/Alberta's henchmen

== Episodes ==
No.	Title	Directed by	Written by	Original release date
1	"Queen Bee"	James Sheldon	Richard M. Bluel	September 11, 1976
2	"Mr. Mephisto"	H. Wesley Kenney	Alan Dinehart and Herbert Finn	September 18, 1976
3	"The Tickler"	H. Wesley Kenney	Charles Isaacs	September 25, 1976
4	"The Ringmaster"	Herman Hoffman	Jay Thompson	October 2, 1976
5	"Music Man"	James Sheldon	Earle Doud and Chuck McCann	October 9, 1976
6	"No Face"	James Sheldon	Greg Strangis	October 16, 1976
7	"The Astrologer"	William P. D'Angelo	Greg Strangis	October 23, 1976
8	"Ultra Witch"	Herman Hoffman	Roy Kammerman	October 30, 1976
9	"The Wizard"	William P. D'Angelo	Bill Freedman and Al Schwartz	November 6, 1976
10	"The Skull"	Herman Hoffman	Roy Kammerman	November 13, 1976
11	"The Weatherman"	Herman Hoffman	Bruce Shelly	November 20, 1976
12	"Lawrence of Moravia"	William P. D'Angelo	Stanley Ralph Ross	November 27, 1976
13	"Albert/Alberta"	James Sheldon	Courtney Andrews & Laurie Samara	December 4, 1976

== Home media ==
Monster Squad: The Complete Series was released in Region 1 on June 23, 2009, by Virgil Films and Entertainment. The Region 2 release followed on August 3 the same year, by Fabulous Films.

== In popular culture ==
A later, unrelated animated television series by Hanna-Barbera called Drak Pack had a similar premise, as did the DC Comics characters the Creature Commandos, although they fought Nazis rather that super-criminals. A similar group of Universal-inspired monsters appeared in a film of the same name.

In Teen Titans Go! episode 8, "Monster Squad", the Titans want to be the scariest trick-or-treaters in town, so Raven casts a spell to turn them into real monsters.
