= Max Julien =

American actor (1933–2022)

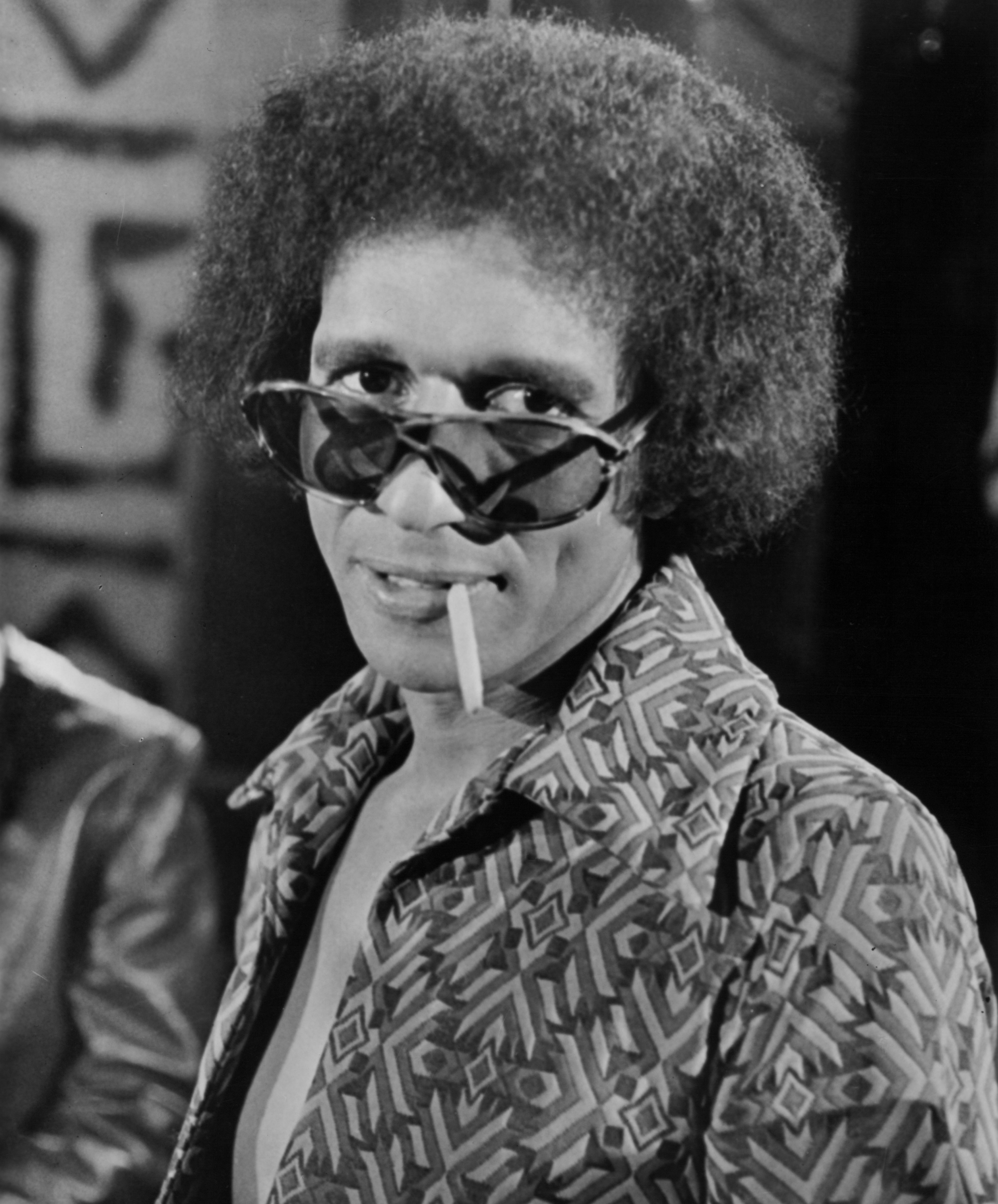
- Julien as Goldie in The Mack (1973)
- Born: Maxwell Julien Banks; July 12, 1933; Washington, D.C., U.S.
- Died: January 1, 2022 (aged 88); Los Angeles, California, U.S.
- Occupations: Actor; sculptor; clothes designer
- Years active: 1966–2005
- Known for: Goldie – The Mack
- Height: 1.88 m (6 ft 2 in)
- Spouse: Arabella Chavers (m. 1991)
- Partner(s): Vonetta McGee (1970–1977)
- Children: 1

Maxwell Julien Banks (July 12, 1933 – January 1, 2022), better known by his stage name Max Julien, was an American actor, sculptor, and clothes designer best known for his role as Goldie in the 1973 blaxploitation film The Mack.

== Early life ==
Julien was born in Washington, DC on July 12, 1933. He became a member of Xi chapter of Kappa Alpha Psi at Howard University on December 4, 1954.

== Career ==
He began his career on the stage on New York City's Off-Broadway circuit including roles in Joseph Papp's Shakespeare-In-The-Park. Moving westward to Hollywood, he landed co-starring roles with Jack Nicholson in Psych-Out and Candice Bergen in Columbia's box-office hit film Getting Straight.

While spending time in Rome, Italy, he wrote and directed a documentary called Trestevre, then wrote the screenplay for, and subsequently co-produced, Warner Brothers's blaxploitation classic Cleopatra Jones, which starred actress Tamara Dobson in the title role as a narcotics agent who was as skilled in martial arts as she was with firearms. Julien refused to participate in the sequel, Cleopatra Jones and the Casino of Gold, which led to his being credited instead with the film's story and script both being "based on characters created by Max Julien".

Aside from The Mack, Julien also appeared in Def Jam's How to Be a Player and he guest starred on TV shows such as The Mod Squad, The Bold Ones: The Protectors, and One on One.

== Death ==
Julien died in Los Angeles on January 1, 2022, at the age of 88. Along with his wife, he was survived by a daughter.

== Personal life ==
Julien was in a live-in relationship with actress Vonetta McGee from 1974 to 1977. McGee appeared with him in the 1974 western action film Thomasine & Bushrod, which was intended as a counterpart to the 1967 film Bonnie and Clyde. He married Arabella Chavers in 1991. The couple resided in Los Angeles.

== Filmography ==
- 1966 The Black Klansman as Raymond
- 1968 Psych-Out as Elwood
- 1968 The Savage Seven as Grey Wolf
- 1968 Up Tight! as Johnny Wells
- 1968 The Mod Squad as Jack Dawson (TV 1 episode)
- 1969 The Bold Ones: The Protectors as Coley Walker (TV pilot episode "Deadlock")
- 1969 CBS Playhouse as Joe Barnes (TV 1 episode)
- 1970 Getting Straight as Ellis
- 1970 The Name of the Game as Mjoma (TV 1 episode)
- 1973 The Mack as John "Goldie" Mickens
- 1973 Cleopatra Jones (Screenwriter)
- 1974 Thomasine & Bushrod as J.P. Bushrod
- 1997 Def Jam's How to Be a Player as Uncle Fred
- 2001 Restore as Coach Barnes
- 2005 One on One as "Goldie" (TV 1 episode)
