= Adrienne Pearce =

South African actress

- Other names: Adrienne Pierce; Adrienne Pearse
- Occupation: Actress
- Years active: 1981–present

Adrienne Pearce (sometimes credited as Pierce or Pearse) is a South African actress. Her films include Proteus, The Bone Snatcher, Van der Merwe, Tremors: A Cold Day in Hell, and Glasshouse. On television, she has featured in the SABC series The Legend of the Hidden City and the Netflix series Troy: Fall of a City.

== Early life ==
Pearce trained in dance at the Masque School of Ballet in Durban and the South African Dance Teachers' Association in Pretoria. She began her career performing audio programmes for Springbok Radio.

== Filmography ==
=== Film ===
Year	Title	Role	Notes
1985	Deadly Passion	Waitress	
1988	Purgatory	Janine	
1988	Lethal Woman	Trudy the Henchwoman	
1988	The Shadowed Mind	Stephanie	
1988	Rhino	Zara	
1989	American Ninja 3: Blood Hunt	Secretary	
1989	Out on Bail	Maggie	
1990	Impact	Hooker	
1990	Warriors from Hell	Angie McCoy	
1994	Demon Keeper	Dia Gregory	
2001	Styx	Janet	Direct-to-video
2003	Proteus	Tinnie	
2003	The Bone Snatcher	Magda	
2004	Blast	Dr. Dorbet	
2011	The Lion of Judah	Helda	Voice role
2014	Konfetti	Dawn Lieberman	
2014	Spud 3: Learning to Fly	Ms. Owen	
2015	Chip	Friend	Short film
2015	Bow Tie (Afrikaans: Strikdas)	Tinkie	
2017	Double Echo	Mother	
2017	Van der Merwe	Mavis Stokes	
2017	Dear Father Christmas (Afrikaans: Liewe Kersfeesvader)	Tinkie Windvogel	
2018	Tremors: A Cold Day in Hell	Mac	Direct-to-video
2019	Bhai's Cafe	Mrs. Raphaelly	
2019	The Red Sea Diving Resort	Secretary	
2021	Glasshouse	Mother	
2021	Afterlife of the Party	Dr. Redding	
2024	Masinga: The Calling	Colonel Amanda Rigley	
2024	Lilies Not for Me	Matron	

=== Television ===
Year	Title	Role	Notes
1981	The Memorandum	Hana	Television film
1997	The Legend of the Hidden City	Kabeth	
2001	Mein Papa mit der kalten Schnauze	Frau Hishcke	Television film
2002	The Swap	Administrator	
2002	The Red Phone: Manhunt	Puttnam	Television film
2003	Red Phone 2	Puttnam	Television film
2004	12 Days of Terror	Mrs. Stillwell	Television film
2005	Sterne über Madeira	Charlotte Hornbach	Television film
2005	Charlie Jade	Ms. Jensen	Episode: "Things Unseen"
2005	Supervnova	Giselle Lamond	Miniseries
2005	The Triangle	Emily's Mother	Miniseries
2007	Jonestown: Paradise Lost	Sharon Amos	Documentary
2010	Silent Witness	Judge	Home: Part 1
2012	Infested!	Sharon Girard	Episode: "Driven Insane"
2017	The Last Post	Midwife	Episode: "Starfish"
2017	Tali's Wedding Diary	Lena Ljungbord	Episode: "The Engagement"
2018	The Looming Tower	Sara	Episode: "Losing My Religion"
2018	Troy: Fall of a City	Iola	Miniseries; 5 episodes
2019	Schwiegereltern im Busch	Amtsbotin	Television film
2019	Deep State	Helen Irving	Episode: "The New Normal"
2021	The Watch	Wynona Crowsnatcher	Episode: "Twilight Canyons"
2022	Resident Evil	Mrs Morgan	Episode: "Welcome to New Raccoon City"
2023	FDR	Sara Roosevelt	Episode: "Nothing to Fear"
2024	The Morning After	Mrs Fine	4 episodes

== Stage ==
Year	Title	Role	Notes
1982	Accommodations		Baxter Theatre Centre, Cape Town
1983	The Rise and Fall of the First Empress Bonaparte	Paulina	South African State Theatre, Pretoria; Alexander Theatre, Johannesburg
1990	Softer than Rock		National Arts Festival
2003	Cry, the Beloved Country		National Arts Festival
2005–2007	The boy who fell from the roof	Mother	Artscape Theatre Centre, Cape Town; Theatre on the Square, Sandton
2009	The Insatiables	Melissa	Theatre on the Bay, Cape Town
2011–2012	The Comedy of Errors	Abbess	Maynardville Open-Air Theatre, Cape Town
2011–2012	Mary and the Conqueror	Julie Mullard	Artscape Theatre Centre, Cape Town; Johannesburg
2015	For Whom the Bell Tolls		

== Awards and nominations ==
Year	Award	Category	Work	Result	Ref.
2012	Dublin Gay Theatre Festival	Best Female Performance	Mary and the Conqueror	Nominated	
2013	Naledi Theatre Awards	Best Performance by a Supporting Actress	Mary and the Conqueror	Nominated	
