= Cleopatra Jones =

1973 film by Jack Starrett

- Theatrical release poster
- Directed by: Jack Starrett
- Screenplay by: Max Julien; Sheldon Keller
- Story by: Max Julien
- Produced by: William "Bill" Tennant; Max Julien
- Starring: Tamara Dobson; Bernie Casey; Shelley Winters; Antonio Fargas
- Cinematography: David M. Walsh
- Edited by: Allan Jacobs
- Music by: J. J. Johnson
- Production company: William Tennant Productions
- Distributed by: Warner Bros.
- Release date: July 13, 1973
- Running time: 89 minutes
- Country: United States
- Language: English
- Box office: $3.2 million (US/Canada rentals)

Cleopatra Jones is a 1973 American blaxploitation film directed by Jack Starrett. Tamara Dobson stars as an undercover government agent who uses the day job of supermodel as her cover and an excuse to travel to exotic places. Bernie Casey, Shelley Winters and Antonio Fargas also feature. The film has been described as being primarily an action film, but also partially a comedy with a spoof tone. It was followed by the sequel Cleopatra Jones and the Casino of Gold, released in 1975.

== Plot ==
Cleopatra "Cleo" Jones is an undercover special agent for the United States government. Overseas modeling is only a cover for her real job: Cleo is a James Bond-like heroine with power and influence. She drives a silver and black '73 Corvette Stingray (equipped with automatic weapons), and has martial arts ability. She also remains loyal to her drug-ravaged community and her lover, Reuben Masters, who runs B&S House (a community home for recovering drug addicts).

Cleo is overseeing the destruction of a poppy field in Turkey belonging to the evil drug lord Mommy. Mommy employs an all-male crew and a bevy of beautiful young women catering to her many wants. When she hears about her poppies' demise, she plots revenge, ordering a corrupt policeman to raid the B&S House.

When Cleo returns to LA to arrest the police responsible for the raid, she continues to take apart Mommy's underworld drug business, thwarting her minions along the way. Cleo and Mommy face off in a showdown, in which she is trapped by Mommy in a car crusher but is saved by her friends from the B&S House. In the final showdown, Cleo chases Mommy to the top of a magnetic crane where the two women fight. Mommy proves to be no match for Cleo, who hurls Mommy over the side of the crane to her death, while Cleo's friends defeat her henchmen. At the end of the film, as Reuben and the members of the community celebrate victory, Cleo departs the scene. She sets off to complete her mission of stemming the tide of drugs that flow into her community.

== Cast ==
- Tamara Dobson as Cleopatra Jones
- Bernie Casey as Reuben Masters
- Shelley Winters as Mommy
- Brenda Sykes as Tiffany
- Antonio Fargas as "Doodlebug" Simpkins
- Bill McKinney as Officer Purdy
- Dan Frazer as Captain Crawford
- Stafford Morgan as Sergeant Kert
- Mike Warren as Miller Anderson
- Albert Popwell as Matthew Johnson
- Caro Kenyatta as Melvin Johnson
- Esther Rolle as Mrs. Johnson

Don Cornelius and Frankie Crocker make appearances as themselves, while former child-star Eugene W. Jackson II makes an appearance as Henry and actor Lee Weaver plays Henry's friend.

== Background ==
Cleopatra Jones was made by Warner Bros. following the success of the Shaft series and AIP's films. It opened at a time when the Black Power Movement, Black Arts Movement, second-wave feminism, and an increasingly growing black feminism were all prevalent. From this social context emerged the desire for a black heroine who appealed to women through a combination of alluring femininity, female strength, and combat skill. The film depicts the harsh reality of the black ghetto, but also portrays a united community whose members help and support one another. The film's final scene, in which Jones, Reuben, and the other B&S members join to defeat Mommy, reflects the Black Arts Movement's emphasis upon the need for the black community to work together to defeat white supremacy.

Although Cleopatra Jones contains themes relating specifically to the Black Power and feminist movements, it appeals to the general public and is said to be the "first blaxploitation film to use martial arts as part of its promotion." It appeals to audiences who enjoy action movies (such as the James Bond series) and has invited comparisons between Jones and Bond. Critic Chris Norton suggested, "like Bond, Cleo is not a stealthy character who tries to infiltrate the underworld by losing her identity ... Bond seldom tried to hide his identity, often using his real name during introductions, and all Bond films rely on his being recognized as 007." Likewise, Jones is rarely undercover, and is flashy and flamboyant on the job. Norton continues by saying "Cleo's outrageous outfits are also analogous with Bond's dinner jackets and playboy wardrobe. Her three-foot hat brims and flowing fur robes are treated with respect and awe within the film, just as Bond's refinements are looked upon as the height of good taste". Norton noted, however, that "Cleo is not simply a black James Bond. While the Cleopatra Jones films have co-opted Bond, they avoid a total fusion of her character of Bond."

However, the film is also deliberately funny, with one-liners and over-the-top villains. These were presumably the work of co-writer Sheldon Keller, a veteran TV comedy specialist whose numerous credits include The Dick Van Dyke Show and Caesar's Hour.

Max Julien originally wrote the part of Jones for his then-girlfriend Vonetta McGee, but the part was eventually given to Dobson, a fashion model whose height inspired the film's tag line: "6 feet 2 inches of dynamite." Although blaxploitation films generally used sex to attract an audience, Cleopatra Jones was comparatively modest, containing no nudity or explicit sex. The wardrobe for the title character was designed by Giorgio di Sant' Angelo.

Just as Jones came from a poor, high-crime neighborhood, Dobson came from a working-class background. She grew up in Baltimore's inner city; her mother owned a beauty salon and her father worked at a railroad station. After earning a degree from the Baltimore Institute of Art, Dobson moved to New York City to become a model. Her race proved an obstacle until she caught the attention of movie producers searching for a black heroine.

== Themes and interpretations ==
=== Feminism and sexuality ===
Cleopatra Jones has been analyzed by academics, particularly its attitudes towards race, sex and feminism. It is argued the film illustrates the film industry's progress toward gender equality. While Jones is both feminine and fashionable, at the same time she is talented in combat and driving, even more so than the men in the film. She is seen as a strong, assertive and combative woman who is able to both appeal to men and defeat them physically. On one hand, Jones ably combats Mommy's male henchmen, but on the other, she maintains a loving relationship with Reuben. Cleopatra and Reuben's relationship can be considered a more progressive look at black male and black female relations at the time. Reuben is a strong black man who also cares for recovering kids at the B&S House. However he is also willing to fight as he comes to Jones' aid and they fight alongside one another.

Although Jones' character and relationships are in keeping with feminist principles, the portrayal of Mommy is perceived as less groundbreaking. She is presented as a hypersexual lesbian; her character displays many negative traits, such as her constant lust and obsession with sex. Mommy exerts tyrannical control over her henchmen and physically and verbally abuses her young female attendants.

During this period, feminism was "often seen as a white woman's movement; some have seen it as anti-black." Even Dobson stated that a message she would have liked the film to portray would have been a more centered approach towards racial equality rather than gender. She stated in an interview, "We're trying to free our men. I believe in equal pay ... I don't want to talk about it, because I don't think of Cleopatra Jones as being a women's libber. I see her as a very positive, strong lady who knows what she has to do."

Cleopatra Jones differs from other blaxploitation films which depict what scholars have described as a "phallic heroine." Dobson herself refused to do nude scenes, striving to separate herself from the hypersexuality of many other black heroines of the time. Her opinion that "sex is more interesting when you don't show everything at once" is clearly indicated by her modesty throughout the film. During a love scene between Jones and Reuben, the two share a long, intimate kiss rather than passionately making love. The scene illustrates love and intimacy rather than the lust often depicted in other popular blaxploitation films. Jones flaunts her sexuality through her appearance, managing to remain an autonomous and strong female protagonist.

=== Race ===
Dobson's role was an example of the potential of a new black female presence in popular action cinema. Earlier in the 1970s, the Hollywood-supported black urban ghetto action films had followed one of a few plot lines: the black pimp or drug hustler on a mission for material wealth and autonomy from "the Man"; the lone hero from the ghetto with white institutional power; or the legitimate hero whose mission is to stop drug activity within the black community. The last narrative, albeit more rare than the others, can be seen in Cleopatra Jones.

While Jones works for "the Man", a white, all-powerful leader (the American government), the film also indicates a move toward racial equality. Jones works for an unnamed agency and wears a badge that reads "Special Agent to the President." Ironically, though she works for the white government, Jones is clearly better at policing black neighborhoods than are white cops. Cleopatra Jones replaces the traditional white male action hero with a powerful and assertive black heroine. Also, her mission is directly related to improving the black community.

An instance displaying the racism of a stereotypical white police officer is seen in the character of Officer Purdy, when Jones asks him who was responsible for the raid on B&S house and Purdy replies, "I never planted no dope on nobody! And if I did, I wouldn't lift a finger to help you or any of your kind."

Another theme within the film is the Black Power-generated "Black Is Beautiful" consciousness seen in Jones's appearance. Although she is seen as a center of attraction and sexuality, she still wears an Afro, which signified black affirmation. Jones' obscured hair underscores racial difference and departure from the traditional long hair as a sign of white, feminine sexual beauty. Also, her colorful and flashy outfits were a departure from the more modest, classy appeal of the James Bond hero. These emphasized a departure from the traditional white male hero. Dobson herself believed that her role enabled black beauty to be more visible in mainstream media. She stated, "It's true there are very few black models. You won't see them smiling out at you from the covers of major magazines. Editors blame this on the market ... but I say forget the market—we're talking about a pretty girl. I've seen oooogly white girls on magazine covers. But black girls must be safe. They must have straight hair, or hair that can be pressed, and they must have Caucasian features."

On the other hand, critics may view the emphasis on Jones' exoticism to be racially stereotypical rather than glorifying black beauty. Parts of Dobson's physicality reverberate with notions of black animalistic imagery. Jones appears in elaborate fur coverings and dramatic makeup, especially around the eyes. Lisa Anderson describes such imagery: "The animal metaphors resurface; the jezebel is represented as a tiger, a puma, a panther, or other large, sleek cat who slinks up and pounces on her prey. She is a frightening apparition in the white imagination."

== Soundtrack ==
Cleopatra Jones is accompanied by a rhythm and blues soundtrack featuring Joe Simon singing "Theme from Cleopatra Jones" and Millie Jackson singing "Love Doctor" and "It Hurts So Good." Instrumentals on the soundtrack include "Goin' to the Chase," "Wrecking Yard" and "Go Chase Cleo". The soundtrack was a popular success, selling well over 500,000 copies.

== Reception ==
The film opened to a favorable critical reception. Los Angeles Times film critic Kevin Thomas called it "an exceptionally well-made black action picture ... From start to finish this fast-moving Warner's release is shrewdly calculated and affirms the gifts of its director Jack [Starrett] in bringing style and meaning to the exploitation picture. In her first starring role Miss Dobson more than makes up for her lack of acting experience by her dazzling looks, sultry personality, and unwavering poise."

Novotny Lawrence, Director of the Black Film Center & Archive at Indiana University Bloomington, writes that by tapping into the Black Pride movement, the use of the name Cleopatra for a character who was strong physically, but equally feminine and independent, appealed to the urban public. As the queen of Egypt, Cleopatra's role as a leader allowed African American women to identify with Dobson's character and finally call a heroine their own.

On the other hand, critics of the blaxploitation industry complained that they were "dismayed by Tamara's image as a karate-chopping, pistol popping terror." In response Dobson replied, "You go through phases until you find the right situation where a character works for you. A lot of tits and ass movies were made, ballbuster films, exploitation pictures. But I don't care what anybody calls it. Doing Cleopatra Jones gave me a chance to work. I loved Cleo. She was not only gracious, but strong, clever, intelligent and sexy."

The film was a box office success, grossing more than $100,000 in its first week of release, climbing to $400,000 by the fifth week.

== Sequel ==
A sequel, Cleopatra Jones and the Casino of Gold, was released in 1975, with Dobson reprising the title role. In the film, Jones travels to Hong Kong to free government agents Matthew and Melvin Johnson, who have been captured by the Dragon Lady (Stella Stevens). Jones pairs up with Mi Lin-fong (Tien Lie) and ends up in the Dragon Lady's casino, headquarters for her underground drug empire.

The sequel's lack of popularity was due not only to its poor reviews but also to the decline of blaxploitation films in general.

== Video releases ==
Cleopatra Jones was released on Warner Home Video in 1986, in both Betamax and VHS formats.
