= Charles Bail =

American film director and actor

Charles Bail (born August 1935, died November 25, 2020), sometimes credited as Chuck Bail, was an American film director, actor, and stuntman.

== Career ==
Bail directed five full-length films: Black Samson (1974), Cleopatra Jones and the Casino of Gold (1975), The Gumball Rally (1976), Choke Canyon (1986), and Street Corner Justice (1996).

He appeared in the 1980 film The Stunt Man as Chuck, the stunt coordinator, essentially playing himself.

== Death ==
Bail died on November 25, 2020, at the age of 85.
