= Annette Sinclair =

American actress and author

- Born: Annette Maria Szymanski; United States
- Occupations: Actress; author
- Years active: 1983–2011
- Spouse: Bob Seger (m. 1988; div. 1989)

Annette Sinclair, born Annette Maria Szymanski, is an American former actress. She was the ex-wife of singer Bob Seger.

Her career spanned movies, television, commercials, music videos and book writing.

== Filmography ==
=== Films ===
- Thief of Hearts (1984) as College Girl #1
- Weekend Pass (1984) as Maxine
- Hide and Go Shriek (1988) as Kim Downs
- The Job (2009) as Soap Actress Mom
- Listen To Me (1989) as Fountain Girl
- Instant Karma (1990) as Amy
- Lunatics: A Love Story (1991) as Blonde
- Red & Blue Marbles (2011) as Secretary

=== Television ===
- Matt Houston (1983) as Marcia
- Days Of Our Lives (1984) as Amy
- Full House (1989) as Miss Borland
- Finder of Lost Loves (1985) as Vicky Selman

=== Music videos ===
- Eric Carmen's 1988 Make Me Lose Control

=== Advertising ===
- Pontiac car commercials

== Writing ==
- Calculus Highlights: An Overview (1997)
- Building Global Leadership: Strategies for Success (2005) with Barbara Agyeman.
- The Management Agenda
- The Leader As Storyteller: Engaging Hearts and Minds
- What Makes an Excellent Virtual Manager

== Personal life ==
Annette kept details about her private life away from the media. As such, little is known publicly about her birth, childhood or family.

On November 8, 1987 she married American singer/songwriter Bob Seger, but he filed for divorce 10 months later. In 1990 she sued him, alleging physical abuse, a false promise to remarry her, and pressure to get an abortion while they were divorcing.
