= Black Samson =

1974 film

- Directed by: Charles Bail
- Written by: Daniel B. Cady (story); Warren Hamilton Jr.
- Produced by: Daniel Cady
- Starring: Rockne Tarkington; William Smith; Connie Strickland; Carol Speed; Michael Payne
- Cinematography: Henning Schellerup
- Edited by: Duane Hartzell
- Music by: Allen Toussaint
- Production company: Omni Pictures
- Distributed by: Warner Bros.
- Release date: August 16, 1974
- Running time: 88 minutes
- Country: United States
- Language: English

Black Samson is a 1974 American blaxploitation film, starring Rockne Tarkington, Carol Speed, William Smith and Connie Strickland. The film was written by Daniel B. Cady (who also produced) and Warren Hamilton Jr., directed by Charles Bail and released by Warner Bros. It was the directorial debut for Bail, more commonly billed as Chuck Bail, a renowned stunt co-ordinator best known for playing himself in Richard Rush's The Stunt Man.

== Plot ==
Armed with a quarterstaff and his pet African lion named Hoodoo, noble nightclub owner Samson (Rockne Tarkington) does his best to keep his neighborhood clean of crime and drugs. When vicious mobster Giovanni "Johnny" Nappa (William Smith) tries to muscle in on Samson's territory, Samson takes a stand against Nappa and his flunkies.

== Cast ==
- Rockne Tarkington as Samson
- William Smith as Giovanni "Johnny" Nappa
- Connie Strickland as Tina
- Carol Speed as Leslie
- Michael Payne as Arthur
- Joe Tornatore as Harry
- Titos Vandis as Giuseppe "Joe" Nappa
- Napoleon Whiting as Henry "Old Henry"
- John Alderman as Michael Briggs
- Fred Scheiwiller as Charlie Frisco
- Ernest Robinson as "Ragamuffin"
- Kenneth Crowe as Vic
- Nick Dimitri as Milo
- Ken Bell as C.T.
- Junero Jennings as "Shine"
- Marvin Walters as Junkie
- Shelley St. Clair as Nappa's Secretary
- Gene LeBell as Nappa's Gang Member
- Bob Minor as Samson's Street People

== See also ==
- List of American films of 1974
