= Skip Schoolnik =

American film director

- Born: July 17, 1945 (age 80)
- Occupations: Film director, producer, editor

Stuart "Skip" Schoolnik (born July 17, 1945) is an American film director, producer, and editor who received his degree from the University of Connecticut and resides in California. He is the post production producer for WGN's Salem.

Schoolnik has directed Hide and Go Shriek (1988) as well as episodes of the television shows Angel and Beyond Belief: Fact or Fiction. The character of Skip was actually a tribute to Schoolnik, who directed five episodes for Angel. Schoolnik has also edited several movies and television shows such as the TV version of Halloween, Halloween II, Knight Rider 2010, and Buffy the Vampire Slayer.

As either co-producer or associate producer, he has worked on many projects including Angel, Beyond Belief: Fact or Fiction, Hollywood Confidential, Purgatory, and Kung Fu: The Movie.

In recent years, Schoolnik has worked as associate producer on AMC's The Walking Dead, associate producer on the BBC/Starz show Torchwood, post production producer on TNT's Legends, and post production producer on Fox's K-Ville.
