= Uphill All the Way =

1986 film by Frank Q. Dobbs

- Directed by: Frank Q. Dobbs
- Written by: Frank Q. Dobbs
- Produced by: David L. Ford (producer); Burr Smidt (producer); Mel Tillis (executive producer); Renée Valente (executive producer); Bob Younts (associate producer)
- Starring: Roy Clark; Mel Tillis; Burl Ives; Glen Campbell; Trish Van Devere; Frank Gorshin; Richard Paul
- Cinematography: Roland "Ozzie" Smith
- Edited by: Chuck Weiss
- Music by: Dennis M. Pratt
- Distributed by: New World Pictures
- Release date: January 1986
- Running time: 86 minutes
- Country: United States
- Language: English

Uphill All The Way is a 1986 American comedy Western film directed by Frank Q. Dobbs and starring Roy Clark, Mel Tillis, Glen Campbell, Burl Ives, Trish Van Devere, Elaine Joyce, Frank Gorshin and Sheb Wooley. The film has developed a very small cult following among Western fans.

== Plot ==
Southwestern United States, circa 1916. Two bumbling good ol' boys, Ben and Booger, are thrown off a train after failing to show their tickets. They wander into a saloon/brothel and unsuccessfully attempt to cheat their way into a fortune at the card table.

Penniless, they try to trade their shotgun for a loan at the bank, causing a teller to sound the alarm. They try to escape by hitching a lift from a driver who thinks they are stealing his car at gunpoint, and runs away to demand that they face justice. The sheriff forms a posse to capture them, but Ben and Booger "terrorize" two U.S. Army troopers with their shotgun, allowing them to steal their horses and uniforms. The sheriff orders the two out-of-uniform troopers to join the hunt, and there is a chaotic chase across the West, with gunfights. Ben and Booger escape by train into Mexico, but cannot find their tickets, so once again they get flung off the train. Viewers are left to assume that they are off to launch their next fraudulent scheme.

== Cast ==
- Roy Clark as Ben
- Mel Tillis as Booger
- Frank Gorshin as Pike
- Richard Paul as Bank Teller
- Burl Ives as Sheriff
- Glen Campbell as Captain
- Burton Gilliam as Corporal
- Gailard Sartain as Private
- Elaine Joyce as Miss Jessie
- Sheb Wooley as Anson Sudro
- Trish Van Devere as Widow Quinn
- Rockne Tarkington as Leon
- Pedro Gonzalez Gonzalez as Carlos "Chicken Carlos"
- Burt Reynolds as The Gambler (uncredited)
- Jo Perkins as Mrs. Sudro
- David Logan Rankin as Tom Sudro
