= Brothers (1977 film) =

1977 film

- Directed by: Arthur Barron
- Produced by: Edward Lewis; Mildred Lewis
- Starring: Bernie Casey; Vonetta McGee; Ron O'Neal; John Lehne; Stu Gilliam; Renny Roker; Owen Pace; Dwan Smith; Martin St. Judge
- Cinematography: John Arthur Morrill
- Edited by: William Paul Dornisch
- Music by: Taj Mahal
- Production companies: Edward Lewis Productions; Soho Productions; Warner Bros. Pictures
- Distributed by: Warner Bros. Pictures
- Release date: 3 August 1977
- Running time: 105 minutes
- Country: United States
- Language: English

Brothers is a 1977 American drama film directed by Arthur Barron and produced by Edward Lewis and Mildred Lewis. It stars Bernie Casey, Vonetta McGee, Ron O'Neal, John Lehne, Stu Gilliam, Renny Roker, Owen Pace, Dwan Smith and Martin St. Judge in the lead roles.

The film parallels the real life stories of Black radicals Angela Davis, George Jackson, and Jonathan Jackson. The plot tracks closely to the real life events from the mid-1960 to early 1970 including the Marin County Civic Center rebellion, the founding of the Black Guerilla Family, the writings of George Jackson including Blood in My Eye and Soledad Brother: The Prison Letters of George Jackson, and the case of the Soledad Brothers.

This film's music is composed by Taj Mahal.

== Plot summary ==
The film begins with the events surrounding the arrest and conviction of David Thomas on trumped up charges of armed robbery. He is sentenced to "one year to life" in prison. He is soon sent to Mendocino Prison, a facility described as "our number one concentration camp for Black" by David's brother, Josh.

In prison David is subjected to overt racism, violence, and mistreatment by guards and the administration. His cellmate, Walter Nance, provides David with a radical political education. Soon David starts organizing prisoners to fight back against the racist oppression. He starts a clandestine newsletter which is distributed and read by Black prisoners.

At the same time, Josh is working on supporting his brother in prison. Josh goes to visit Paula Jones, a revolutionary Black professor. As a result of Josh's entreaties Paula begins reading David's writings and the two begin correspondence. Paula begins to mobilize support for the brothers in Mendocino. She also begins to fall in love with David.

After a guard murders of one of the Black prisoners, the prisoners rebel. During the rebellion a guard is thrown to his death from the prison's third tier. Guards frame David and two other radical Black prisoners for the killing. During a court hearing, Josh pulls out a pistol and takes the prosecuting attorney and judge as hostages. He flees the courthouse and into a van. He is gunned down in the parking lot. In the gunfire the judge and prosecutor are also killed.

Paula, at the urging of her colleagues, decides to flee and go underground out of fear of prosecution for allegedly aiding and abetting the courthouse actions. She changes her appearance and location but is captured, likely because of a snitch.

Sometime later, at Mendocino Prison, guards engineer an agent provocateur to pretend to start an armed riot. The guards' plan seems to be to use this as an excuse to assassinate David. David realizes this and attempts to take the situation into his own hands. Tragically, he is gunned down in the prison yard.

The film ends with all the Mendocino prisoners walking into the chow hall in racial solidarity and sitting together. The racist guards staring slack jawed and afraid.

== Cast ==
- Bernie Casey as David Thomas
- Vonetta McGee as Paula Jones
- Ron O'Neal as Walter Nance
- John Lehne as McGee
- Stu Gilliam as Robinson
- Renny Roker as Lewis
- Owen Pace as Joshua
- Dwan Smith as Kendra
- Martin St. Judge as Williams
- Al Turner as Henry Taylor
- Samantha Harper as Joan Kline
- Carl M. Craig as Jack Browning
- Sam Nudell as Attorney Sirrell
- Jim Swoopes as Sen. Billings
- Dick Yarmy as District Attorney Wayne
- Charles Ricardo Brown as Horton
- Susan Barrister as Tina
- Alphonso Williams as Bill
- Oliver Fletcher as Lacy
- Sidney Galanty as Balaban
- Joseph Havener as Warden
- Cynthia Songé as Staff Girl
- Mercedes Alberti as Female Guard
- John Zaremba
- Robert Cortes

== Release ==
Brothers was released in theatres on August 3, 1977, by Warner Bros. Pictures. The film was released on VHS on September 1, 1998, by Warner Home Video.
