= Cleopatra Jones and the Casino of Gold =

1975 film by Charles Bail

- Theatrical release poster by Robert Tanenbaum
- Directed by: Charles Bail
- Written by: William Tennant; Max Julien
- Produced by: Run Run Shaw / Bill Tennant
- Starring: Tamara Dobson; Stella Stevens; Tien Ni; Norman Fell
- Cinematography: Alan Hume
- Edited by: Willy Kemplen
- Music by: Dominic Frontiere
- Production companies: Harbor Productions; Shaw Brothers; Warner Bros.
- Distributed by: Warner Bros. Pictures
- Release date: July 11, 1975
- Running time: 96 minutes
- Country: United States
- Language: English
- Budget: $3.6 million

Cleopatra Jones and the Casino of Gold is a 1975 American action-adventure film directed by Charles Bail and starring Tamara Dobson as Cleopatra "Cleo" Jones, Stella Stevens, Tien Ni and Norman Fell. The film is a sequel to the 1973 action film Cleopatra Jones.

== Plot ==
The story begins with two government agents, Matthew Johnson and Melvin Johnson, being captured by the "Dragon Lady" (Stella Stevens). Cleopatra Jones then travels to Hong Kong to rescue the agents. Jones pairs up with Mi Lin-fong (Tien Ni) and ends up in the Dragon Lady's casino, which, in actuality, is the headquarters for her underground drug empire. Jones and Mi use their combat skills to battle the Dragon Lady's henchmen and rescue the agents.

== Cast ==
- Tamara Dobson as Cleopatra Jones
- Tien Ni as Mi Lin-Fong (credited as Tanny)
- Stella Stevens as Dragon Lady
- Norman Fell as Stanley Nagel
- Albert Popwell as Matthew Johnson
- Caro Kenyatta as Melvin Johnson

== Background ==
Max Julien, author of the source story for and a co-producer of the film's predecessor Cleopatra Jones, refused to participate in the production, and instead got token credit for the story and script having been "based on characters created by" him.

J. J. Johnson produced the soundtrack for the movie; using oriental music with jazz, bass and strings to "invoke an exotic aura." Tamara Dobson, who was 6 feet 2 inches tall, was certified the tallest leading lady in film by the Guinness Book of World Records when she portrayed the character, Cleopatra Jones, in both films.

== Reception ==
Film critic Roger Ebert wrote "there's an incredible variety of action, none of it too gruesomely explicit, and Cleo finds time between machine gun bursts to warn one of the kids that he's no Evel Knievel. She's no James Bond, either, but the movie's not bad in a silly sort of way.

Verina glaesner of the Monthly Film Bulletin stated, "with little to do between shoot-outs and bouts of martial-arts action, the title character is effectively reduced to a joke." Film critic Vincent Canby wrote, "it is a trashy black exploitation movie that denies the large, beautiful, and overwhelming presence of Miss Dobson, whose real sexuality is denied by her movie costumes that seem to have been designed by a female impersonator."

Sight and Sound opined that "blaxploitation meets martial arts in this lively romp; Dobson shows poise and bad attitude aplenty; her freewheeling approach to police work exasperates her bosses, but sure enough the villains all get their comeuppance by the final reel; Run Run Shaw produced the pic so it's little surprise that the fight sequences are so nifty."

== Release ==
The film was released on VHS by Warner Home Video in October 1987, as part of their "Walking Weapons Trio" series, which also included Lethal Weapon and Enter the Dragon. The movie was then released to DVD in the United Kingdom in 1996 by Warner Home Video, and again by Warner Brothers as part of its Warner Archive Collection in 2010.

== See also ==
- List of action films of the 1970s
- List of films set in Hong Kong
- List of American films of 1975
