= Steve Sandor =

American actor (1937–2017)

- Born: October 27, 1937; Pittsburgh, Pennsylvania, U.S.
- Died: April 5, 2017 (aged 79); Las Vegas, Nevada, U.S.
- Occupation: Actor
- Years active: 1960–2017

Steve Sandor (October 27, 1937 – April 5, 2017) was an American actor who made his first television appearance on Star Trek, playing Lars in the second season episode "The Gamesters of Triskelion".

== Formative years ==
Born in Pittsburgh, Pennsylvania on October 27, 1937, Sandor grew up in that city's Greenfield neighborhood. Employed as a steel worker before his acting career, he also trained sentry dogs while serving as an air police officer in the U.S. Air Force.

== Career ==
Having appeared in many television shows such as Gunsmoke, Ironside, The Streets of San Francisco, Starsky and Hutch, CHiPs, Charlie's Angels, Fantasy Island, Three's Company, The A-Team, Knight Rider, The Fall Guy, and Hardcastle and McCormick, Sandor is perhaps best known for his role as the ill-fated biker gang leader Stanley in the 1980 cult film The Ninth Configuration, and as the voice of the heroic Darkwolf in the 1983 animated fantasy film Fire and Ice.

Sandor also had supporting roles in the 1967 western Rough Night in Jericho, the 1968 crime drama If He Hollers, Let Him Go!, the 1969 World War II classic The Bridge at Remagen, the 1969 outlaw biker film Hell's Angels '69, the 1971 western One More Train to Rob, the 1973 crime drama Bonnie's Kids, the 1973 Vietnam film The No Mercy Man, a semi-regular role on the short-lived TV series The Yellow Rose, and the title role in the 1983 science fiction film Stryker. Sandor was also part of the extensive cast of the 1978 miniseries Centennial, and was cast in the 1988 IMAX film Alamo: The Price of Freedom as James Bowie.

== Death ==
Sandor died in Las Vegas, Nevada on April 5, 2017.

== Filmography ==
Year	Title	Role	Notes
1967	Rough Night in Jericho	Simms	
1968	If He Hollers, Let Him Go!	Harry	
1969	The Bridge at Remagen	Pvt. Slavek	
1969	Hell's Angels '69	Apache	
1970	The Virginian	Billy White / Van Miley	2 episodes
1971	One More Train to Rob	Jim Gant	
1972	Bonnie's Kids	Larry	
1972	The Only Way Home	Billy Joe	
1973	The No Mercy Man	Olie Hand	
1980	The Ninth Configuration	Stanley	
1983	Fire and Ice	Darkwolf (voice)	
1983	Stryker	Stryker	
1990	The Platinum Triangle	Joshua Pierce	
1998	Superman: The Animated Series	Orion (voice)	Episode: "Apokolips... Now!"
