= Demon Keeper =

- Directed by: Joe Tornatore
- Written by: Mike Angel
- Produced by: Cheryl Latimer; John Marshall; Joe Tornatore; Maurice Smith; Roger Corman
- Starring: Dirk Benedict
- Production company: The Pacific Trust
- Distributed by: New Horizons Video
- Release date: 1994 (video)
- Running time: 72 minutes
- Country: United States
- Language: English

Demon Keeper is a 1994 American horror film directed by Joe Tornatore for New Horizon Pictures. It was shot in Zimbabwe.

== Plot ==
A fake medium conjures up an angry demon.

== Cast ==
- Dirk Benedict as Alexander Harris
- Edward Albert as Remy Grilland
- Mike Lane
- André Jacobs
- Adrienne Pearce
- David Sherwood
- Jennifer Steyn
- Claire Marshall
- Diane Nuttall
- Elsa Martin

== Production ==
The original cut of the film was felt to be not scary enough, so at the behest of Roger Corman, additional scenes were shot using a demon. According to Imagi Movies, "the addition is laughably obvious, for two reasons: first the demon never appears on the sets where the original footage was shot; second, the new scenes were done on video tape and run through the "film-look" process, with less than good results."

== Reception ==
Senseless Pictures called it "small but underrated."

Psychotronic Video said "Attention fans of Grotesque. Tomatore is back with more inept but entertaining nonsense."

The Roanoke Times called it "fun if you're on the mood for a really bad movie. Otherwise forget it." In a review for the Orlando Sentinel, Joe Bob Briggs wrote "not since Plan 9 from Outer Space have this many earnest authors been this sincerely awful."
