= Purgatory (1988 film) =

- DVD cover
- Directed by: Ami Artzi
- Written by: Paul Aratow, Felix Kroll
- Produced by: Ami Artzi, Elizabeth Rowley, Patricia Shorten, Peter Smook
- Starring: Tanya Roberts
- Cinematography: Tom Fraser
- Edited by: Skip Schoolnik
- Music by: Julian Laxton
- Production companies: The Film Company, Kingsway, International Media Exchange
- Distributed by: New Star Entertainment
- Release date: 1988
- Running time: 89 minutes
- Country: United States
- Language: English

Purgatory is a 1988 American thriller film directed by Ami Artzi and starring Tanya Roberts, Julie Pop, Hal Orlandini, Adrienne Pearce, and John Newland. This woman-in-prison film centers on two Peace Corps workers who are framed for drug trafficking and jailed in Africa.

== Plot ==
The film follows Carly (Tanya Roberts) and Melanie (Julie Pop), two Peace Corps volunteers who are preparing to leave a fictional African country called Umlanga. On their way to the airport, they pick up a hitchhiker who is secretly carrying drugs. During a police checkpoint, the drugs are discovered, and when the hitchhiker attempts to flee, he is killed. With no one to vouch for their innocence, Carly and Melanie are falsely accused of drug smuggling.

Following a swift and corrupt trial, they are sentenced to eleven years in the notorious women's prison known as "Purgatory." Upon arrival, they face brutal conditions, including sexual abuse and exploitation carried out by the corrupt warden and prison guards. Carly quickly learns that showing fear or aggression only leads to further abuse. Melanie struggles to cope and eventually breaks down, while Carly, becoming the warden’s favorite, is forced to work in a prison brothel.

Despite her mother's efforts to secure her release and the lack of assistance from the American embassy, Carly’s situation grows increasingly desperate. The film explores their attempts to survive the oppressive environment and highlights the widespread corruption and brutality within the prison system.

== Cast ==
- Tanya Roberts as Carly
- Julie Pop as Melanie
- Hal Orlandini as Bledsoe
- Adrienne Pearce as Janine
- Marie Human as Kirsten
- Rufus Swart as Paul
- David Sherwood as Stern
- Clare Marshall as Ruth (Carly’s mother)
