= The Zebra Force =

1976 film directed by Joe Tornatore

- Can the end justify the means? When It's Revenge...All Hell Breaks Loose!
- Directed by: Joe Tornatore
- Written by: Robert Leon (screenplay); Annette Lombardi (writer); Joe Tornatore (concept)
- Produced by: Eddy Donno (associate producer); Joseph Lucchese (producer); Deno Paoli (executive producer); Larry Price (producer); Jefferson Richard (associate producer); Joe Tornatore (producer)
- Starring: Mike Lane; Richard X. Slattery; Rockne Tarkington; Timothy Brown
- Cinematography: Thomas F. Denove; Billy Dickson; Robert Maxwell
- Edited by: Ed Hansen; Michael Kahn
- Music by: Charles Bernstein (as Charles Alden)
- Production company: Pac West Cinema Group
- Distributed by: Echo Bridge Home Entertainment; Trans World Entertainment; Cannon Films
- Release dates: 1976 (Argentina); 1980 (Philippines); 1984 (US)
- Running time: 100 minutes; 86 minutes (Swedish cut version)
- Country: United States
- Language: English

The Zebra Force (Codename: Zebra, USA title) is a 1976 American film directed by Joe Tornatore. The film is about a group of Vietnam War veterans who declare war on Los Angeles drug dealers and the Mafia. The film is also known as Code Name: Zebra (US) and Commando Zebra (Italy). A sequel by Joe Tornatore with Mike Lane, also named Code Name: Zebra followed in 1987. The websites Letterboxd and The Grindhouse Database list this movie as belonging to the vetsploitation subgenre.

== Plot ==
The film opens with a raid on an illegal casino performed by a group of blacks with automatic weapons. The audience discovers the perpetrators are white disguised as blacks. The story moves to a Vietnam War flashbacks with a patrol being ambushed by the Vietcong, and the resulting firefight. The leader of the vigilante veterans is a man known simply as the Lieutenant who was their platoon leader and disfigured in the action. Recuperating in a hospital he regroups the survivors for a series of escalating raids to not only to enrich themselves, but to wipe out organised criminal gangs involved in illegal gambling and narcotics distribution.

The main protagonist of the film is Carmine Longo, a Mafia enforcer sent to meet with local chief to discover who performed the action. The two are assisted by a corrupt Los Angeles Police Department detective sergeant. Their suspicion falls on their only known suspects, a gang of drug dealing black criminals who deny their involvement. Longo schemes to eliminate them through their police contact who will set up a drug deal where they can be killed by the police.

== Cast ==
- Mike Lane as Carmine Longo
- Richard X. Slattery as Charlie DeSantis
- Rockne Tarkington as Earl Lovington
- Timothy Brown as Jim Bob Cougar
- Glenn Wilder as Lieutenant Dan
- Anthony Caruso as Salvatore Moreno
- Stafford Morgan as Sergeant Stangman
- Clay Tanner as Lieutenant Claymore
- Tony Cristino as Willie
- Mario Milano as Peter
- David Ankrum as Art
- Buddy Ochoa as Larry
- Patrick Strong as Nick
- Bernard Tierman as Ernie
