= Henry Polic II =

American actor (1945–2013)

- Born: Henry Albert Polic II; February 20, 1945; Pittsburgh, Pennsylvania, U.S.
- Died: August 11, 2013 (aged 68); Sherman Oaks, California, U.S.
- Education: Florida State University
- Occupation: Actor
- Years active: 1975–2004

Henry Albert Polic II (February 20, 1945 – August 11, 2013) was an American stage, screen, and voice actor, best known as Jerry Silver on Webster.

== Early life ==
He earned his Master of Fine Arts from Florida State University and later served in the military police at Fort Riley in Kansas. While at Florida State University he starred in many stage productions including Our Town. He also was an active member of Tau Kappa Epsilon fraternity.

== Career ==
In 1975, Polic was a regular cast member on Mel Brooks' short-lived television comedy When Things Were Rotten. Polic also had a regular role as Dracula in Monster Squad (1976).

In the 1980s, Polic was often seen as a celebrity guest player on various game shows. His frequent guest spots were on the various incarnations of Pyramid, as he appeared multiple times on The $25,000 Pyramid and the editions of The $100,000 Pyramid hosted by Dick Clark and John Davidson for producer Bob Stewart. Polic did various other work for Stewart, hosting the game show Double Talk in 1986, a pilot for a revival of Stewart's Eye Guess called Eye Q in 1988, and sharing announcing duties with Johnny Gilbert and Dean Goss on the latter edition of The $100,000 Pyramid. His specialties included foreign and regional accents, ballroom dancing and baritone singing.

From the early 1990s until his death, Polic was perhaps best known as the original voice of the Scarecrow in Batman: The Animated Series. Originally, he had a deep, gruff voice, but later made his voice a bit higher for the role. Polic also worked at Florida State University as a guest star in the School of Theatre's production of A Christmas Carol, playing Ebenezer Scrooge in 1996.

== Death ==
Polic died on August 11, 2013 of cancer. A US Army Vietnam era veteran, he is interred at National Memorial Cemetery of Arizona in Phoenix.

== Filmography ==
=== Film ===
Year	Title	Role	Notes
1977	The Last Remake of Beau Geste	Captain Merdmanger	
1978	Rabbit Test	Tito	
1979	Scavenger Hunt	Naked Policeman	
1980	Oh, God! Book II	Psychiatrist 5	
1989	Hollywood Chaos		
1992	Double Trouble	Stephen Tarlow	Uncredited
1993	King B: A Life in the Movies	Stuart Peters	
2000	Bring Him Home	Ames	
2001	All You Need	Mr. Etheridge	
2002	Would I Lie to You?	Button King	Direct-to-video

=== Television ===
Year	Title	Role	Notes
1975	When Things Were Rotten	Sheriff of Nottingham	13 episodes
1976	The Bionic Woman	The Man	Episode: "Bionic Beauty"
1976	Monster Squad	Dracula	13 episodes
1977	Alice	Walter	Episode: "The Failure"
1977	McNamara's Band	Schnell	Television film
1978–1980	Eight Is Enough	Jay Redding	2 episodes
1978–1981	Fantasy Island	Baron Boris, Marty	2 episodes
1979	Mork & Mindy	Dr. Benton Phillips	Episode: "Mork Runs Down"
1979	Detective School	Zarkov	Episode: "Hooray for Bulgaria"
1979	Scooby-Doo and Scrappy-Doo	Additional voices	
1980	The Incredible Hulk	Donald	Episode: "Equinox"
1980	The Love Boat	Pierre	Episode: "No Girls for Doc/Marriage of Convenience/The Caller/The Witness"
1980–1981	The Fonz and the Happy Days Gang	Additional voices	24 episodes
1981	Scruples	Mark Stiner	Television film
1982	Darkroom	Frederick	Episode: "The Rarest of Wines"
1982	Shirt Tales	Additional voices	13 episodes
1982	Cagney & Lacey	Francois	Episode: "Beauty Burglars"
1982	The New Odd Couple	Davies	Episode: "The Cordon Blues"
1982	The Smurfs Christmas Special		Voice, television short
1982–1989	The Smurfs	Tracker Smurf	Voice, recurring role
1983	The Dukes		Voice, 13 episodes
1983	Gun Shy	Randy Turner	Episode: "We Gotta Know When to Hold 'Em"
1983	The New Scooby and Scrappy-Doo Show		Voice
1983–1989	Webster	Jerry Silver, The Devil	66 episodes
1984	The New Scooby-Doo Mysteries	Additional voices	Episode: "Happy Birthday, Scooby-Doo"
1984–1985	E/R	Dr. Ravi Raja, Ivo	2 episodes
1985	Hotel	Roy Stern	Episode: "Illusions"
1985	The Greatest Adventure: Stories from the Bible	Secal	Voice, episode: "Daniel and the Lion's Den"
1986–1989	Murder, She Wrote	Arthur Bishop, Alan Dupree	2 episodes
1988	Top Cat and the Beverly Hills Cats	Snerdly	Voice, television film
1988	The New Yogi Bear Show	Additional voices	4 episodes
1988	Superman	Wildsharkk	Voice, episode: "Wildsharkk"
1988–1989	Fantastic Max	Additional voices	Voice, 3 episodes
1989–1990	Paddington Bear	Sir Sealy Bloom	Voice, 2 episodes
1990	Midnight Patrol: Adventures in the Dream Zone		Voice, 13 episodes
1990	The Adventures of Don Coyote and Sancho Panda	Additional voices	Episode: "Pity the Poor Pirate"
1991	They Came from Outer Space	Val Vincent	Episode: "Hair Today, Gone Tomorrow"
1991	Morton & Hayes	Maitre'd	Episode: "Daffy Dicks"
1991	Yo Yogi!	Baba Looey	Voice, 9 episodes
1992	The Golden Palace	Dining Room Guest	Episode: "Seems Like Old Times: Part 1"
1992	Saved by the Bell	Mr. Bainbridge	Episode: "Snow White and the Seven Dorks"
1992	Tom & Jerry Kids		Voice, episode: "Penthouse Mouse/12 Angry Sheep/The Ant Attack"
1992–1994	Batman: The Animated Series	Jonathan Crane / Scarecrow	Voice, 6 episodes
1993	I Yabba-Dabba Do!	Seagull Writer	Voice, television film
1994	Mighty Max	Nemo	Voice, episode: "Around the World in Eighty Arms"
1999	Profiler	Richard Fallen	Episode: "Three Carat Crisis"
2000	The Trial of Old Drum	Doc Thompson	Television film
2000	Sheena	Professor Barrington	Episode: "Wild Thing"
2003	She Spies	Michael Osborne	Episode: "Gone Bad"
2004	Combustion	Dr. Watson	Television film; final role
