= Hide and Go Shriek =

- Directed by: Skip Schoolnik
- Written by: Michael Kelly
- Produced by: Dimitri Villard
- Starring: Brittain Frye; Donna Baltron; George Thomas; Bunky Jones
- Cinematography: Eugene Shlugleit
- Edited by: Tim Alexander; Mark Mano; Amy Tompkins; Adam Wolfe
- Music by: John Ross
- Distributed by: New Star Entertainment
- Release date: November 13, 1987
- Running time: 90 minutes (Note: The unrated cut of the film runs 94 minutes.)
- Country: United States
- Language: English

Hide and Go Shriek (released in edited form on home video as Close Your Eyes and Pray in the United Kingdom) is a 1987 American slasher film directed by Skip Schoolnik in his directorial debut, and starring Bunky Jones, Annette Sinclair, Brittain Frye, Donna Baltron, George Thomas, and Sean Kanan in his film debut. The story details a group of teenagers who celebrate their graduation by staying the night inside a furniture store, where they are stalked and murdered by a cross-dressing killer during a game of hide and go seek.

== Plot ==
Four couples—Judy and David, John and Bonnie, Randy and Kim, and Shawn and Melissa—have just graduated from high school and are preparing to sneak into a furniture store owned by John's father, Phil, in downtown Los Angeles. The teenagers begin to drink beer and party as John gives them a tour of the entire store. Kim suggests playing hide-and-go-seek. During the second round, Melissa is killed by an unknown murderer.

At midnight, the remaining six regroup to eat dinner, all concerned about Shawn and Melissa's whereabouts. The group searches everywhere, but are unable to find them. The couples go to bed. As John and Bonnie are having sex, a man dressed in Shawn's clothes enters the room and incites John to chase after him. They start a fight, but the killer impales a mannequin's arm through John's stomach, killing him. Later, Shawn encounters what he initially believes to be a woman wearing a fishnet corset, but when the figure emerges from the shadows, he realizes it is in fact a man. The assailant grabs him by the throat and impales him on a stone decorative sculpture.

Shortly after, Kim is abducted by the assailant, who binds and gags her, leaving her on top of a freight elevator in the store. One by one, the remaining friends wake up. The group tries to call the police, but find the phone line cut and all exits chained shut. They begin to panic and try to get the attention of a vagabond, then a passing cop car, but to no avail. They discover the dead bodies of their friends and arm themselves with weapons, ready to fight back. Across the street, a shopkeeper notices them in the store and calls the police to report an intrusion.

The group encounters Fred, an ex-convict employee hiding out in the building. Believing him to be the killer, they knock him unconscious and tie him up. The group gets in the freight elevator, unaware Kim is on top of it. They begin to hear a struggle above, as Kim is accosted by the murderer. She attempts to climb off the top of the elevator car, but is decapitated as it passes a floor.

When the killer attacks the group, Fred appears and tackles the killer, who is revealed to be Zack, Fred's gay lover from prison. Zack tells Fred that he killed the teenagers as he thought they were coming between him and Fred. Fred rejects Zack, who attacks Fred with a knife. Judy lunges forward to slash Zack with a razor. Zack leaps back and stumbles over Kim's severed head before falling down the empty elevator shaft. After that, the police and Phil arrive. As Phil asks Fred what had happened, Fred succumbs to his wounds and dies.

The surviving teenagers are checked over by paramedics before leaving the store and getting into a single ambulance, unaware that Zack has killed and replaced the driver of a second ambulance.

== Cast ==
- Bunky Jones as Bonnie Williams
- Brittain Frye as Randy Flint
- Annette Sinclair as Kim Downs
- George Thomas as David Hanson
- Donna Baltron as Judy Ramerize
- Scott Fults as Shawn Phillips
- Ria Pavia as Melissa Morgan
- Sean Kanan as John Robbins
- Scott Kubay as Zack
- Jeff Levine as Fred
- Ron Colby as Phil Robbins
- Donald Mark Spencer as Vince

== Production ==
=== Development ===
Skip Schoolnik, a film editor who had co-edited Halloween II (1981) with John Carpenter, was hired to direct Hide and Go Shriek after the original director resigned from the project.

=== Filming ===
Principal photography took place in three stories of a commercial building in downtown Los Angeles. Schoolnik hired cinematographer Eugene Shlugleit to shoot the film based on his work on Evil Dead II (1987).

== Release ==
The film was given a limited theatrical release in the United States on November 13, 1987 by New Star Entertainment, opening regionally in North Carolina. The film had its violence trimmed in order to receive an R rating.

=== Home media ===
Hide and Go Shriek was released in unrated and R-rated cuts on VHS by New Star Video in 1988 and by New World Video in 1989, respectively. as well as on LaserDisc by Image Entertainment. In the United Kingdom, it was released under the title Close Your Eyes and Pray for its home video release, which was shorn of fifty seconds.

The film was initially released on DVD in the United Kingdom by Bellevue Entertainment A/S on July 22, 2004, under its original title. Scanbox Entertainment issued another DVD in Region 2, and was included in a 'Platinum Collection' with Dolly Dearest, Inner Sanctum 2, and Dark Breed.

Hide and Go Shriek was released by Code Red on Blu-ray for the first time on December 3, 2016, (Note: Blu-ray.com noted the release to be December 3, 2016.) with a remastered 2K scan from the original internegative; this release featured only the R-rated cut of the film. This was followed by a DVD release by Kino Lorber on May 30, 2017. The same year, 88 Films released the film on dual Blu-ray and DVD format in the United Kingdom on July 10, which was subsequently reissued on Blu-ray on February 11, 2019.

Terror Vision released a limited edition 4K UHD Blu-ray edition through their online store, which was released on July 9, 2026. Prior to its release, the new 4K restoration was screened at Fantastic Fest in late 2025.

== Reception ==
George Jewell of the San Antonio Express-News wrote that, while "not the best of the genre, [Hide and Go Shriek is] also far from the worst." Jim Carnes of The Sacramento Union described the film's plot as "unspectacular."

Phil Vettel of the Chicago Tribune found the film nonsensical and described the characters as "typical slasher film morons... Hide and Go Shriek is filled with inanities."

Writer John Kenneth Muir notes in his book Horror Films of the 1980s (2011): "To its credit, Hide and Go Shriek does feature a few moments guaranteed to make the hair on the back of your neck stand on end," adding that the killer in the film is "unsettling" and generates a "potent fear" in the finale.

== Sources ==
- Muir, John Kenneth (2011). Horror Films of the 1980s. Vol. 1. Jefferson, North Carolina: McFarland & Company. ISBN 978-0-786-45501-0.
