= The No Mercy Man =

1973 film

- Film poster
- Directed by: Daniel Vance
- Written by: Daniel Vance; Mike Nolin (Michael Nolin)
- Produced by: Bill Coker; Paul Rubey Johnson
- Starring: Steve Sandor; Rockne Tarkington; Sid Haig; Ron Thompson; Mike Lane; Richard X. Slattery
- Cinematography: Dean Cundey
- Edited by: George Jay Nicholson
- Music by: Don Vincent
- Distributed by: Cannon Film Distributors
- Release date: 1973
- Running time: 91 minutes
- Country: United States
- Language: English

The No Mercy Man (also known as Bad Man, Trained to Kill, and Trained to Kill USA) is a 1973 action film with elements of a modern-day Western starring Steve Sandor, Rockne Tarkington, Sid Haig, Ron Thompson, Mike Lane, and Richard X. Slattery. The film was co-written (with Michael Nolin) and directed by Daniel Vance in his first and last feature film. The film was shot in Todd-AO by Dean Cundey in his first feature film with Buddy Joe Hooker arranging the stunt work and acting as second unit director. Master Jerry Druckerman acted as the film's martial arts technical advisor.

Film director Quentin Tarantino programmed The No Mercy Man as part of a March 2011 revenge film triple feature at the New Beverly Cinema, which Tarantino took over in March 2007. The websites Letterboxd, and The Grindhouse Database list this movie as belonging to the vetsploitation subgenre.

== Plot ==
Prophet and his friends are carnies and itinerant criminals in Arizona. After robbing a liquor store Prophet and a carny, Dunn, evade the local Sheriff and stop at the ranch of Mark Hand, a decorated war veteran. Feeling suspicious, Mark tells Prophet he can help himself to water at a pump behind the house but covers him with a rifle. Dunn overpowers Mark from behind with a knife, ties him up and beats him prior to robbing Mark's house. Attracted by the mass amount of firearms in Mark's cabinet, they are distracted by Mark's daughter Mary. Prophet chases after Mary and pins her to the ground, telling her reassuringly as she struggles, "Don't worry, you'll ask for it before I take it." Prophet drags Mary back to the house and in the kitchen, Mary wounds Dunn with a knife and escapes. Mary comes across the car returning home driven by Mrs. Hand and Mary's brother Olie who has returned from the Vietnam War with decorations and mental illnesses. Prophet and Dunn make their escape with Mark puzzled that Olie doesn't want to hunt the criminals, preferring to let the sheriff handle the matter.

Though glad to be home, Olie grows more sullen and uncommunicative. Two of Olie's war buddies visit the Hand ranch and reveal that Olie was their legendary commander of a 6-man long-range reconnaissance patrol of United States Army Rangers, with one patrol taking them to Haiphong where they escaped in a Russian ship. Despite the supporting presence of his comrades in arms and loving family Olie grows more withdrawn and prone to flashbacks to the war where he nearly kills one of his friends when the two engage in good-natured sparring.

Meanwhile, Prophet and his friends plan more criminal acts where they steal a large recreational vehicle that they plan to sell across the border in Mexico, but the gang murders the family who own it. Some members of Prophet's gang stop off at a gas station where they abuse the attendant until they are beaten up by Olie and his army buddies. Enraged, Prophet plans revenge and a big criminal score where they will attack the Hand ranch, steal Hand's mass arsenal, recruit a motorcycle gang led by Pill Box to distract the sheriff, and rob the town's bank where they will split the proceeds with Pill Box and make their escape to Mexico that lies across open rangeland adjoining the Hand ranch. Olie bids his army buddies farewell then further descends into a self-pitying alcoholic stupor.

Prophet and his gang attack the Hand ranch and beat Mark unconscious. When the women of the ranch are assaulted and moments away from being raped Olie finally snaps and explodes through the wall of the shed he has been cowering in, brandishing a shotgun. Olie guns down the gang and kills Pill Box and Dunn with a knife. Olie has a final fight with Prophet and beats Prophet to death with a heavy chain.

== Cast ==
- Steve Sandor as Olie Hand
- Rockne Tarkington as Prophet
- Richard X. Slattery as Mark Hand
- Heidi Vaughn as Mary Hand
- Mike Lane as Jack "Big Jack"
- Sid Haig as Pill Box
- Ron Thompson as John Dunn
- David Booth as Beetle
- Daniel Oaks as Corporal Lyle Talbot
- Tom Scott as Parrish
- Michael Prichard as Bruce Bennett
- Peg Stewart as Mrs. Hand
- Richard Collier as Joshua White
- Darlene Feasel as Dora Adams
- Russell Morrell as Sheriff Harris

== Songs ==
The No Mercy Man
Written by Lois and Don Vincent
Performed by Al Gambino & Glory

Sunshine Lady
Written and Performed by Chris Christian

Fighting The Forgotten Feeling
Written and Performed by Chris Christian

Ballad of Olie Hand
Written and Performed by Chris Christian

Lonely Lonely Times
Written by Lois and Don Vincent
Performed by Al Gambino & Glory

Reach Out
Written by Lois and Don Vincent
Performed by Al Gambino & Glory

== See also ==
- List of American films of 1973
