= Richard Collier (actor) =

American film and television actor

- Collier in Blackbeard's Ghost, 1968
- Born: June 13, 1919; Boston, Massachusetts, U.S.
- Died: March 11, 2000 (aged 80); California, U.S.
- Occupations: Film and television actor

Richard Collier (June 13, 1919 – March 11, 2000) was an American film and television actor.

== Life and career ==
Collier was born in Boston, Massachusetts. He performed on stage and clubs in Massachusetts, and served in the United States Army during World War II. He began his screen career in 1948, appearing in the television series Col. Stoopnagle's Shop. In 1953, he appeared in the films The Glass Wall and I Love Melvin.

Later in his career, Collier guest-starred in numerous television programs including Bonanza, 77 Sunset Strip, Rawhide, The Man from U.N.C.L.E., The Andy Griffith Show, Hawaii Five-O, Sugarfoot, The Adventures of Jim Bowie, Ben Casey, Cheyenne, The Many Loves of Dobie Gillis, Mister Ed and Bachelor Father, and played the recurring role of Harry Price in the CBS sitcom television series Many Happy Returns. He also appeared in films such as Blazing Saddles (as Dr. Sam Johnson), The Chase, Who's Minding the Store?, Good Times, Hello, Dolly!, The No Mercy Man, Blackbeard's Ghost, The Cheyenne Social Club and Mr. Hobbs Takes a Vacation.

Collier retired from acting in 1991, last appearing in the film Eve of Destruction.

== Death ==
Collier died on March 11, 2000, at the Motion Picture and Television Hospital in California, at the age of 90.
