= Thomasine & Bushrod =

1974 film by Gordon Parks Jr.

Thomasine and Bushrod
- Film poster
- Directed by: Gordon Parks Jr.
- Written by: Max Julien
- Produced by: Harvey Bernhard; Max Julien
- Starring: Max Julien; Vonetta McGee; Glynn Turman; George Murdock
- Cinematography: Lucien Ballard
- Edited by: Frank C. Decot
- Music by: Coleridge-Tylor Perkinson
- Production company: Harvey Bernhard Enterprises; Max Julien Ltd.
- Distributed by: Columbia Pictures
- Release date: April 10, 1974
- Running time: 95 minutes
- Country: United States
- Language: English

Thomasine & Bushrod is a 1974 Western film directed by Gordon Parks Jr., written by and starring Max Julien and Vonetta McGee and released by Columbia Pictures. The title song was written by Arthur Lee and performed by his band Love.

Vonetta McGee plays Thomasine and Max Julien plays Bushrod in a film intended as a counterpart to the 1967 film Bonnie and Clyde. Thomasine and Bushrod go on a crime spree through the American south between 1911 and 1915.

== Plot ==
In Texas in 1911, Thomasine knocks out a man who attempted to force himself on her sexually without paying for her prostitution services. She is revealed to actually be a bounty hunter who used her attractiveness to lure in her latest, unsuspecting target. The marshal pays her the bounty, but also threatens her because he does not care for her self-confident attitude. While at the jail she sees a wanted poster of her former boyfriend, Bushrod. She tracks him down and they resume their relationship. Bushrod kills a notorious bank robber nicknamed "Adolph the Butcher", who had murdered his sister. Moments later the marshal arrives on the scene, and he is about to arrest Bushrod but Thomasine intervenes and they get away.

Fugitives, Thomasine and Bushrod take up robbing banks. They do so traveling in the automobiles that are starting to replace horses throughout the country. They are always closely followed by a posse led by the increasingly vengeful marshal. Bushrod gives the stolen money to the African Americans, Mexicans, Native Americans and poor whites with whom they associate, which earns the couple some favorable publicity in the popular press. However, the pregnant Thomasine wants to build a nest egg with the money and move away to a more stable life. They are joined at their hideout by their Jamaican-born friend, Jomo, who has a more casual approach to criminal life.

Jomo is caught on a visit to town, and refuses to tell the marshal where his friends are, even though the marshal is hanging him up by his hands; the marshal then drops him into a pit of venomous snakes. Thomasine and Bushrod go looking for him in a new car Jomo had gotten for them, but themselves fall into a trap, surrounded by the marshal and many gunmen; Thomasine is shot in the back and killed. The enraged Bushrod charges the marshal, who shoots him in the chest, but Bushrod pushes on and shoots the marshal in the head and kills him. The film ends with a flashback to a previous scene of Thomasine and Bushrod happily splashing each other with water in a stream.

== Cast ==
- Max Julien as J.P. Bushrod
- Vonetta McGee as Thomasine
- George Murdock as U.S. Marshal Bogardie
- Glynn Turman as Jomo J. Anderson
- Juanita Moore as Pecolia
- Ben Zeller as Scruggs

== See also ==
- List of American films of 1974
