= Street Corner Justice =

- Directed by: Chuck Bail
- Written by: Chuck Bail; Stan Berkowitz; Gary Kent
- Produced by: Chuck Bail; Jack Brown
- Starring: Marc Singer
- Cinematography: Doug O'Neons; David Golia
- Edited by: W. Peter Miller
- Music by: K. Alexander Wilkinson
- Release date: January 1, 1996
- Running time: 102 minutes
- Country: United States
- Language: English

Street Corner Justice is a 1996 American action film directed by Charles Bail and starring Marc Singer.

== Cast ==
- Marc Singer as Mike Justus
- Steve Railsback as Ryan Freeborn
- Kim Lankford as Jenny Connor
- Beverly Leech as Willie Gee
- Tom Lister Jr. as Angel Aikens
- Soon-Tek Oh as Kwong Chuck Lee
- Bryan Cranston as Father Brophy

== Reception ==
William Thomas of Empire awarded the film two stars out of five.
