= Mike Lane =

American actor

Personal information
- Born: Michael V. Lane; January 6, 1933 Washington D.C., U.S.
- Died: June 1, 2015 (aged 82) Palmdale, California, U.S.

Professional wrestling career
- Ring name: Tarzan Mike
- Billed height: 6 ft 8 in (203 cm)
- Billed weight: 275 lb (125 kg)
- Debut: 1952
- Retired: 1959

Michael V. Lane (January 6, 1933 – June 1, 2015) was an American actor and professional wrestler. He is best known for his role as Toro Moreno in the 1956 film The Harder They Fall, a film noir based on the Primo Carnera boxing scandal.

== Biography ==
Lane's size (height 6'8" or 2.03 m, weight 275 lbs or 125 kg) led him to work in the King Bros. Circus boxing tent and wrestling tent. He also wrestled professionally under the name "Tarzan Mike" in 1952–1959. While filming The Harder They Fall, Lane was given dramatic and boxing lessons to appear as the giant Toro Moreno, an outclassed boxer based on Primo Carnera.

Lane made numerous television appearances including a role as a country bumpkin who gets talked into boxing by Bret Maverick (James Garner) and Dandy Jim Buckley (Efrem Zimbalist Jr.) in an epic 1957 episode of Maverick entitled "Stampede." Lane also had a regular role as Frank N. Stein in Monster Squad (1976).

== Filmography ==
=== Film ===
Year	Title	Role	Notes
1956	The Harder They Fall	Toro Moreno	
1957	Hell Canyon Outlaws	Henchman Nels	
1958	Frankenstein 1970	Hans Himmler / The Monster	
1960	Who Was That Lady?	Glinka	
1961	Valley of the Dragons	Anoka	
1962	Ulysses Against the Son of Hercules	Hercules	
1967	The Way West	Sioux Chief	
1968	Stay Away, Joe	Frank Hawk	
1972	The New Centurions	Lumberjack	
1973	The No Mercy Man	Big Jack	
1973	A Name for Evil	Fats	
1975	Gone with the West	Shark	
1975	The Master Gunfighter	Frewen	
1976	Zebra Force	Carmine Longo	
1983	Stryker	Kardis	
1987	Code Name: Zebra	Carmine Longo	
1988	Grotesque	Frank N. Stien	Also producer
1991	Curse of the Crystal Eye	Hashim	
1994	Demon Keeper	Asmodeus (The Demon)	

=== Television ===
Year	Title	Role	Notes
1957	Tales of the 77th Bengal Lancers		Episode: "Test of a Titan"
1957	Cheyenne	Chuck Welch	Episode: "Decision at Gunsight"
1957–1958	Schlitz Playhouse of Stars	Patient	2 episodes
1957–1959	Maverick	Horace Cusack / Noah Perkins	2 episodes
1958	Death Valley Days	Big Bat Pourier	Episode: "The Greatest Scout of All"
1958	The Adventures of Wild Bill Hickok	Chief Red Cloud	Episode: "The Daughter of Casey O'Grady"
1958	Decision		Episode: "Night of the Stranger"
1958	Sugarfoot	John Allman	Episode: "The Hunted"
1959	Steve Canyon	Bartender	Episode: "The Sergeant"
1959	The Rough Riders	Carl	Episode: "The Last Rebel"
1959	Man Without a Gun		Episode: "The Giant"
1959	Have Gun – Will Travel	Waller	Season 3, Episode 9: "The Black Handkerchief"
1960	The Untouchables	James Stenbeck	Episode: "Syndicate Sanctuary"
1960	Hotel de Paree	Jackson	Episode: "Sundance and the Bare-Knuckled Fighters"
1960	The Man from Blackhawk	Lembrick	Episode: "The Hundred Thousand Dollar Policy"
1960	Bourbon Street Beat	Monito	Episode: "Green Hell"
1961	The Tab Hunter Show	Carlos	Episode: "Personal Appearance"
1964	The Outer Limits	The Megasoid	Episode: "The Duplicate Man"
1965	Branded	Trask	Episode: "Mightier Than the Sword"
1966–1969	Daniel Boone	Bear Barnett / Ike	2 episodes
1967	Batman	Daddy Longlegs	2 episodes
1967	Hondo	Moon Dog	Episode: "Hondo and the Superstition Massacre"
1968	The Monkees	Frankenstein	S2:E18, "Monstrous Monkee Mash"
1969	Love, American Style	Roger	Segment: "Love and the Positive Man"
1970	Get Smart	Centurion	Episode: "Smartacus"
1971	Mission: Impossible	Lew Bates	Episode: "The Connection"
1972	Adam-12	Art Moss	Episode: "Citizens All"
1972	Gunsmoke	Digby	Episode: "Sarah"
1972	Ironside	Nick Marcatti	Episode: "Buddy, Can You Spare a Life?"
1972	The Sixth Sense	Sam Fenwick	Episode: "If I Should Die Before I Wake"
1973	Emergency!	Tall Biker	Episode: "Frequency"
1976	Gemini Man	Guard	Episode: "Pilot"
1976	Monster Squad	Frank N. Stein	13 episodes
1976–1977	The Rockford Files	Tony / Fred	2 episodes
1977	Kojak	Curly	Episode: "The Queen of Hearts Is Wild"
1977	Quincy, M.E.	Rossi	Episode: "A Question of Time"
1977	Starsky & Hutch	Eddie Mayer	Episode: "The Crying Child"
1982	Matt Houston	Reject	Episode: "X-22"
1982	Knight Rider	Jerry	Episode: "Forget Me Not"
1983	Simon & Simon	Bodyguard #1	Episode: "Bail Out"
1986	Cold War Killers	Foreman	Television film
