= Ulysses Against the Son of Hercules =

- Directed by: Mario Caiano
- Screenplay by: Mario Caiano; Andre Tabet
- Story by: Mario Caiano; Andre Tabet
- Starring: Georges Marchal; Mike Lane; Alessandra Panaro; Dominique Boschero; Gabriele Tinti; Raffaella Carrà; Raf Baldassarre; Eleonora Bianchi; Yvette Lebon
- Cinematography: Alvaro Mancori
- Edited by: Renato Cinquini
- Music by: Angelo Francesco Lavagnino
- Production companies: Compagnia Cinematografica Mondiale; Fides
- Distributed by: Variety Distribution
- Release date: 3 February 1962 (Italy)
- Running time: 105 minutes
- Countries: Italy; France

Ulysses Against the Son of Hercules (Italian: Ulisse contro Ercole) is a 1962 peplum film directed by Mario Caiano.

== Plot ==
Hercules captures Ulysses, during the latter's return to Ithaca, by order of Zeus. The hero intends to bring Ulysses to Polyphemus, who was blinded by Ulysses years before. During the journey, the two heroes are captured by half-men and half-bird beings. After managing to escape, Ulysses is made prisoner again, this time by the Troglodytae. Hercules carries on his journey and arrives in Greece, coming to the father of his fiancée Helena to set up an expedition against the monster people who want to kill Ulysses.

== Cast ==
- Georges Marchal: Ulysses
- Mike Lane: Hercules
- Alessandra Panaro: Helena
- Dominique Boschero: Queen
- Raffaele Pisu: Assur
- Gabriele Tinti: Mercuro
- Yvette Lebon: Hera
- Raf Baldassarre: Leuco
- Tino Bianchi: King Ircano
- Gianni Santuccio: Lagos
- Raffaella Carrà: Adraste

== Production ==
The film was shot on location at the Canary Islands in Spain.

== Release ==
Ulysses Against the Son of Hercules was released in Italy on 3 February 1962. The film was released in the United States in 1964 with a 99-minute running time. It was released to television in the United States with a 91-minute running time. The film has also been released as Ulysses Against Hercules.

It has been released on home video by Alpha Video.

== See also ==
- List of films featuring Hercules
