= Bustin' Loose (TV series) =

1987–1988 American sitcom television show

- Genre: Sitcom
- Written by: Cindy Begel; Lesa Kite; Daryl Nickens; Lisa Medway; Chuck Tately; Kevin White
- Directed by: Marlene Laird; Bob Lally; Alan Myerson
- Starring: Jimmie Walker; Vonetta McGee; Aaron Lohr; Tyren Perry; Reagan Marie Cole; Larry O. Williams, Jr.
- Theme music composer: Ron Boustead; Greg Poree
- Country of origin: United States
- Original language: English
- No. of seasons: 1
- No. of episodes: 26

Production
- Executive producer: Topper Carew
- Producers: Alyce S. Carew; Allan Manings; Alan Myerson; Linda Nieber
- Editor: Mike Gavaldon
- Running time: 22–24 minutes
- Production companies: Golden Groove Productions; MCA-TV

Original release
- Network: Syndication
- Release: September 19, 1987 – May 28, 1988

Related
- Bustin' Loose (film)

Bustin' Loose is an American sitcom starring Jimmie Walker based on the 1981 film of the same name. The show ran in first-run syndication from September 19, 1987, to May 28, 1988. The series marked Walker's return to a series since Good Times ended in 1979.

== Synopsis ==
Jimmie Walker stars as Sonny Barnes, a former con artist, who has been caught by the authorities and sentenced to five years of community service. He is placed in the home of social worker Mimi Shaw (Vonetta McGee), who lives with four orphans: Rudey (Larry O. Williams, Jr.), Trish (Tyren Perry), Nikky (Aaron Lohr), and Sue Anne (Marie Cole). Sonny lives in the basement and works around the house doing odd jobs. Meanwhile, the kids all love listening to Sonny's often exaggerated tales.

== Cast ==
- Jimmie Walker – Sonny Barnes
- Vonetta McGee – Mimi Shaw
- Aaron Lohr – Nikky Robinson
- Tyren Perry – Trish Reagan
- Marie Cole – Sue Ann Taylor
- Larry O. Williams, Jr. – Rudey Butler

== Episodes ==
No.	Title	Directed by	Written by	Original release date
1	"The First Day of the Rest of My Life"	Unknown	Unknown	September 19, 1987
Mimi decides that Sonny is a poor role model for the kids when they neglect their chores to listen to his colorful stories.
2	"The Baby"	Unknown	Unknown	September 26, 1987
Mimi's widowed friend is pregnant and determined to give up the baby, but when she goes into labor at Mimi's house the gang conspires to change her mind.
3	"Turn Around"	Unknown	Unknown	October 3, 1987
A rough day leaves Mimi unable to deal with the children's demands so Sonny steps in and handles their problems expertly much to her surprise.
4	"Cold Water Blues"	Unknown	Unknown	October 10, 1987
Sonny uses mind over muscle to get "Honest Pete" the plumber to fix the water heater.
5	"Homeless, Sweet Homeless"	Unknown	Unknown	October 17, 1987
The children helps a homeless man who helps himself to Sonny's clothes, then makes a unique contribution to the family garage sale.
6	"Sisters"	Unknown	Unknown	October 24, 1987
Mimi plans a fun-filled but inexpensive party for Sue Anne, but her well to do sister (Margaret Avery) turns it into a lavish gala.
7	"Go for the Gold"	Unknown	Unknown	October 31, 1987
Sonny trains Rudy for the "Special Games" and regaling the teen with tales of his days as an athlete. Kareem Abdul Jabbar guest stars
8	"Wet Weather Ahead"	Unknown	Unknown	November 7, 1987
Sonny helps one of the boys overcome a bed wetting problem, Mimi helps Sonny and Trish deal with their fear of rodents.
9	"I Paint What I See"	Unknown	Unknown	November 14, 1987
Sue Anne creates a painting of her neighborhood for the third grade art show, but the school's art director won't allow her to submit it. Little Richard and Bern Nadette Stanis guest star
10	"Rain, Rain, Go Away"	Unknown	Unknown	November 21, 1987
When the children finds the money, Sonny wants to use the cash to fix the leaky roof, but Mimi wants to turn the money over to the police.
11	"Seems Like Old Times"	Unknown	Unknown	November 28, 1987
The household is disrupted by a visit from Sonny's old buddy Satin who reacts violently when Rudy discovers a secret that Satin's been keeping.
12	"Words of Wisdom"	Unknown	Unknown	December 5, 1987
Sonny is named a finalist in a slogan writing contest, but it was Nicky who submitted the entry in Sonny's name.
13	"The Kindest Cut"	Unknown	Unknown	January 30, 1988
Rudy and Sonny both have sore throats, but they are reluctant to follow the doctor's orders when he prescribes a tonsillectomy for both of them. Dick Anthony Williams guest star.
14	"Doo Wop"	Unknown	Unknown	February 6, 1988
Sonny may have promised more than he can deliver when he assures Mimi that legendary soul singer Calvin James will perform at a fund raiser.
15	"Oh, Big Brother"	Arlando Smith	Richard W. Baxter	February 13, 1988
Rudy feels neglected when Sonny spends all his time earning money for a trip to Jamaica, Sue Anne's teacher has the cure for Sue Anne's sudden illness.
16	"Scammed Straight"	Marlena Laird	Gordon Mitchell	February 20, 1988
When Rudy has difficulty earning the money to go on a class trip, Sonny makes the mistake of telling Rudy how he raised cash in his youth.
17	"The Grass Isn't Greener"	Arlando Smith	Sara V. Finney & Vida Spears	February 27, 1988
Trish hopes to make a good impression at her wealthy friend's country club and Sonny hopes to make a good fortune with a skin cream scheme.
18	"Snow Place Like Home"	Unknown	Unknown	March 5, 1988
When Mimi and Sonny are stranded in a snowstorm, The children call the police to report them kidnapped so that the search will began immediately.
19	"The Parent Trap"	Unknown	Unknown	April 9, 1988
Rudy is ambient about the news that his mother is coming to take him home with her, Sonny has a toothache but is reluctant to go to the dentist. Little Richard guest stars
20	"The Gang's All Here"	Unknown	Unknown	April 16, 1988
Rudy is excited about gaining membership to a new club called The Dragons and Mimi suspects that the club may actually be a gang.
21	"I Am Woman"	Unknown	Unknown	April 23, 1988
Trish resents Mimi's interference in her plan to impress a boy and Sonny recruits Rudy and Nicky to work on his fast food truck.
22	"Nostalgia Ain't What It Used to Be"	Unknown	Unknown	April 30, 1988
Sonny's not laughing when he finds out that Nicky has sold a rare and valuable comic book for five dollars.
23	"Rudeo and Tricia-ette"	Unknown	Unknown	May 7, 1988
Trish saves Rudy's life and a grateful Rudy decides he's in love with her.
24	"It's a Great Big Wonderful World"	Unknown	Unknown	May 14, 1988
The house is rife with tensions represent various countries in a school project.
25	"What's a Nice Girl Like You ...?"	Bob Lally	Ron Friedman	May 21, 1988
Sonny brings home a young woman (Irene Cara) who claims to be an aspiring singer, but turns out to be a gun toting robber.
26	"It's a Pizza Cake"	Unknown	Unknown	May 28, 1988
Sonny wins over the children when he outsmarts the cranky owner of a pizza parlor.

== Award nominations ==
Year	Award	Result	Category	Recipient
1988	Young Artist Awards	Nominated	The Most Promising New Fall Television Series	-
1988	Young Artist Awards	Nominated	Outstanding Young Actors/Actresses Ensemble in Television or Motion Picture	Marie Cole, Aaron Lohr, Tyren Perry, and Larry O. Williams, Jr.

== Stations ==
City	Station
Appleton	WXGZ 32
Atlanta	WGNX 46
Baltimore	WNUV 54
Chicago	WGN 9
Detroit	WXON 20
Los Angeles	KTLA 5
Milwaukee	WVTV 18
New York	WPIX 11
Philadelphia	WPHL 17
Portland	KPDX 49
Richmond	WVRN 63
Tacoma	KSTW 11
Washington, D.C.	WFTY 50
Waterbury	WTXX 20
York	WPMT 43
