= Tamara Dobson =

American actress and model

- Dobson in Cleopatra Jones (1973)
- Born: Tamara Janice Dobson; May 14, 1947; Baltimore, Maryland, U.S.
- Died: October 2, 2006 (aged 59); Baltimore, Maryland, U.S.
- Resting place: Woodlawn Cemetery, Woodlawn, Maryland, U.S.
- Education: Maryland Institute College of Art
- Occupations: Actress; model
- Years active: 1969–1987
- Known for: Cleopatra Jones – Cleopatra Jones, Cleopatra Jones and the Casino of Gold
- Height: 6 ft 2 in (1.88 m)

Tamara Janice Dobson (May 14, 1947 – October 2, 2006) was an American actress and fashion model. Beginning her career in modeling during the late 1960s, Dobson became best known for her title role as government agent Cleopatra "Cleo" Jones in the 1973 blaxploitation film Cleopatra Jones and its 1975 sequel Cleopatra Jones and the Casino of Gold.

== Early life and education ==
Born in Baltimore, Maryland, Dobson was the second of four children born to Melvin and Evelyn Dobson (née Russell). She attended Western High School, an academically demanding all-girls institution. Her father sold tickets for the Pennsylvania Railroad and her mother was a beautician. The family was poor, but Tamara had the full complement of piano, tap and ballet lessons. Her parents sent her on to the Baltimore Institute of Art, and after she got her degree, she went on to qualify as a beautician, like her mother.

Dobson started her modeling career doing fashion shows at her school, Maryland Institute College of Art, where she also received her degree in fashion illustration. While studying, Dobson was discovered in 1969 and began to film commercials and modeled.

== Career ==
After school, Dobson moved from Maryland to New York to model and act full-time. Dobson modeled for Jet Magazine sometime during her early modeling career. Dobson eventually became a fashion model for Vogue Magazine, in addition to modeling for Essence magazine. She was also in TV commercials for Revlon, Fabergé, and Chanel. Dobson is also recognized by the Guinness Book of World Records as the "Tallest Leading Lady in Film", standing at 6 feet 2 inches. Aside from Cleopatra Jones, Dobson had roles in other films such as Come Back, Charleston Blue; Chained Heat and Norman... Is That You?

Dobson also starred in episode 13 of Buck Rogers in the 25th Century as Doctor Delora Bayliss and in Season 2 of Jason of Star Command.

== Work discrimination ==
Dobson experienced racial discrimination during her time working on films. When interviewed by The New York Times, Dobson said,

“I like being a woman,” she goes on. “I have the kind of job I want to do. I have been discriminated against, but not because I'm a woman. It's because I am black. I'm used to people not wanting to be with me because I'm black. Before they see me as being female, they see me as being black. The stigma that's been placed on you because you're black gives you enough kill to get you through the woman thing. It makes you angry! Yes, It's much tougher being black than being woman.”

== Health and death ==
Dobson was diagnosed with multiple sclerosis in 2000. She died on October 2, 2006, at Keswick Multi-Care Center in Baltimore, Maryland, of complications from pneumonia and multiple sclerosis, at age 59. Dobson never married or had children.

== Filmography ==
Year	Title	Role	Notes
1972	Come Back, Charleston Blue		Uncredited
1972	Fuzz	Rochelle	
1973	Cleopatra Jones	Cleopatra "Cleo" Jones	
1975	Cleopatra Jones and the Casino of Gold	Cleopatra "Cleo" Jones	
1976	Norman... Is That You?	Audrey	
1977	Murder at the World Series	Lisa	TV movie
1979	Jason of Star Command	Samantha	12 episodes
1979	Buck Rogers in the 25th Century	Delora Bayliss	1 episode
1983	Chained Heat	Duchess	Final film role
1984	Amazons	Rosalund Joseph	TV movie
