= Vonetta McGee =

American actress (1945–2010)

- McGee in 1975
- Born: Vonetta Lawrence McGee; January 14, 1945; San Francisco, California, U.S.
- Died: July 9, 2010 (aged 65); Berkeley, California, U.S.
- Education: San Francisco State University
- Occupation: Actress
- Years active: 1968–2007
- Spouse: Carl Lumbly (m. 1986)
- Partner: Max Julien (1970–1977)
- Children: 1

Vonetta Lawrence McGee (January 14, 1945 – July 9, 2010) was an American actress. She debuted in the Spaghetti Western The Great Silence and went on to appear in blaxploitation films such as Hammer, Melinda, Blacula, Shaft in Africa, Detroit 9000, and 1974's Thomasine & Bushrod alongside her then-boyfriend Max Julien. In 1975, she was Clint Eastwood's co-star in The Eiger Sanction. She was a regular on the 1987 Universal Television situation comedy Bustin' Loose, starring as Mimi Shaw for its only season (1987–88).

== Early life ==
Born Vonetta Lawrence McGee in San Francisco, California, to Lawrence McGee and Alma McGee (née Scott), McGee graduated from San Francisco Polytechnic High School in 1962. She was diagnosed with Hodgkin's Lymphoma at the age of 17. Her family encouraged her to be a lawyer.

She enrolled at San Francisco State University to study pre-law and acted with the racially conscious Black theater group Aldridge Players West. She eventually dropped out of college and went abroad to seek acting work.

== Career ==
McGee landed her first role in 1968, when she performed alongside Jean-Louis Trintignant and Klaus Kinski in Sergio Corbucci's Spaghetti Western The Great Silence, and made her first released film appearance earlier that year with the lead in the Italian comedy Faustina. She later became well known for her parts in the 1972 Blaxploitation films Melinda and Hammer. In the action thriller Shaft in Africa (1973), McGee took the role of Aleme, the daughter of an emir, who teaches John Shaft (Richard Roundtree) Ethiopian geography. Earlier that year she had appeared in a supporting role as an occult priestess in The Norliss Tapes. In 1974, McGee appeared as Thomasine alongside Max Julien as Bushrod in the western action film Thomasine & Bushrod, which was intended as a counterpart to the 1967 film Bonnie and Clyde. The next year, she starred alongside Clint Eastwood in the action thriller The Eiger Sanction (1975).

The 1977 film Brothers, in which McGee played a character similar to Angela Davis, was pulled from the box office because of the fear of riots. That same year, she noted in an interview with Ebony magazine the decrease in black-led films over the last two years.

She appeared in an episode of the TV series Starsky & Hutch named "Black and Blue" in 1979. She appeared as Marlene, the high-energy lot manager, in the 1984 cult classic Repo Man.

Vonetta McGee always discussed the racism that existed within the industry. When singer Diana Ross landed lead roles and was hailed as proof of equal opportunity Hollywood, McGee argued otherwise. "She has had the luxury of a studio behind her," McGee said. "This is where a lot of us fell short. We all needed a certain amount of protection. But we were on our own."

McGee disliked the term Blaxploitation. She told the LA Times the label was "like racism, so you don't have to think of the individual elements, just the whole." Instead, McGee preferred the "Black-film genre." "Black film," she once said, "is the most valuable art form in pictures since Andy Warhol and Campbell Soup cans, because of the impact it made on the Black community."

== Personal life and death ==
McGee was in a live-in relationship with actor Max Julien from 1974 to 1977. They starred together in the 1974 film Thomasine & Bushrod.

She wanted to focus on writing and filmmaking but she was facing an ongoing battle with Hodgkin's Lymphoma, and took a break to focus on her health in the late 1970s and early 1980s. The 1984 film Repo Man marked her return to the screen.

She met Carl Lumbly on the set of Cagney & Lacey and married him in 1986. They had one child, born in 1988. The couple were spokespeople for the American Lung Association.

McGee was diagnosed with cancer in 2001, and Lumbly became her primary caregiver. McGee died of cardiac arrest on July 9, 2010, aged 65.

== Selected filmography ==
Film
Year	Title	Role	Notes
1968	Faustina	Faustina Ceccarelli	
1968	The Great Silence	Pauline Mid	
1968	The Lost Man	Diane Lawrence	
1970	The Kremlin Letter	"The Negress"	
1972	The Big Bust Out	Nada	
1972	Melinda	Audrey Miller / Melinda Lewis	
1972	Blacula	Tina Williams / Luva	
1972	Hammer	Lois	
1973	The Norliss Tapes	Mademoiselle Jeckiel	
1973	Shaft in Africa	Aleme	
1973	Detroit 9000	Roby Harris	
1974	Thomasine & Bushrod	Thomasine	
1975	The Eiger Sanction	Jemima Brown	
1977	Brothers	Paula Jones	
1977	Foxbat	Toni Hill	
1978	Superdome	Sonny	
1984	Repo Man	Marlene	
1985	Hell Town	Sister Indigo	TV movie
1990	To Sleep with Anger	Pat	
1991	Brother Future	Mortilla	
1998	Johnny B Good	Lidia	
2007	Black August	Georgia Jackson	(final film role)

Television
Year	Title	Role	Notes
1979	Starsky & Hutch	Joan Meredith	1 episode "Black and Blue"
1984–1986	Cagney & Lacey	Claudia Petrie	4 episodes
1985	Hell Town	Sister Indigo	8 episodes
1987	Amen	Monica Rutledge	1 episode
1987–1988	Bustin' Loose	Mimi Shaw	26 episodes
1989–1990	L.A. Law	Jackie Williams	7 episodes
