= Alexander Theatre (Johannesburg) =

Theater in Johannesburg, South Africa

Coordinates: 26.19216676159896°S 28.03512700993462°E

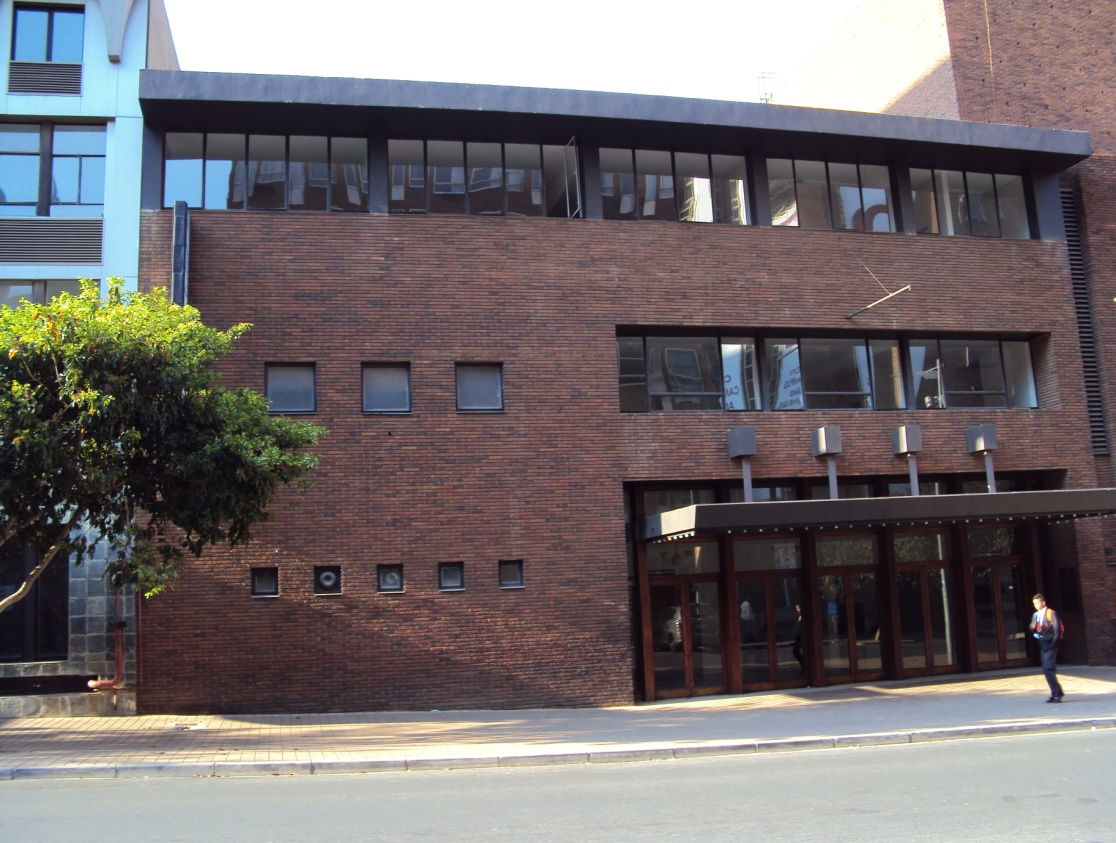
An image of Alexander Theatre (Johannesburg)

The Alexander Theatre (also known as The Alex) is a theatre in Braamfontein, Johannesburg, South Africa.

== History ==
The initial idea for the theatre came about in 1929, however plans did not come to fruition until 1951 when the theatre could be built thanks to life memberships and public donations. The theatre was originally founded as the Johannesburg Repertory Theatre (also known as the Reps' Theatre), seating 550 people in a Scandinavian design. It opened in Braamfontein in November 1951 as the home of the Johannesburg Repertory Players (Johannesburg Reps).

On March 10, 1960, it was renamed the Alexander Theatre after Muriel Alexander, the founder of the Johannesburg Reps and a renowned actress, director and teacher of speech and drama. It opened with Hugh Goldie's production of George Bernard Shaw's Caesar and Cleopatra. The theatre was later used for professional performances by the Reps as well as by other companies. The Reps' last performance here was held in 1969: Noël Coward's Present Laughter. Later, TRUK (Transvaal Performing Arts Center) leased it, and around 1978, that arts council purchased it. By 1997 the theatre had fallen victim to the urban decay of the inner city and subsequently closed with a fall in attendance. In 2001 due to the efforts of the Reps and the theatre's owners, including Jack Ginsburg, the building underwent a R2.5 million refurbishment program and the theatre reopened. In 2006, Adam Levy bought and restored the theatre as part of his urban renewal program in Braamfontein. As much as possible of the original architecture has been preserved. The new venue opened in July 2007 with Hazel Feldman's production of the rock musical Rent.

== Present ==
The theatre is used as a versatile space for a variety of occasions: concerts, TV programs, parties, conferences, award ceremonies, and charity performances. The auditorium seats 536 people, and there are other rooms available as well.
