= Richard X. Slattery =

American actor, former policeman (1925-1997)

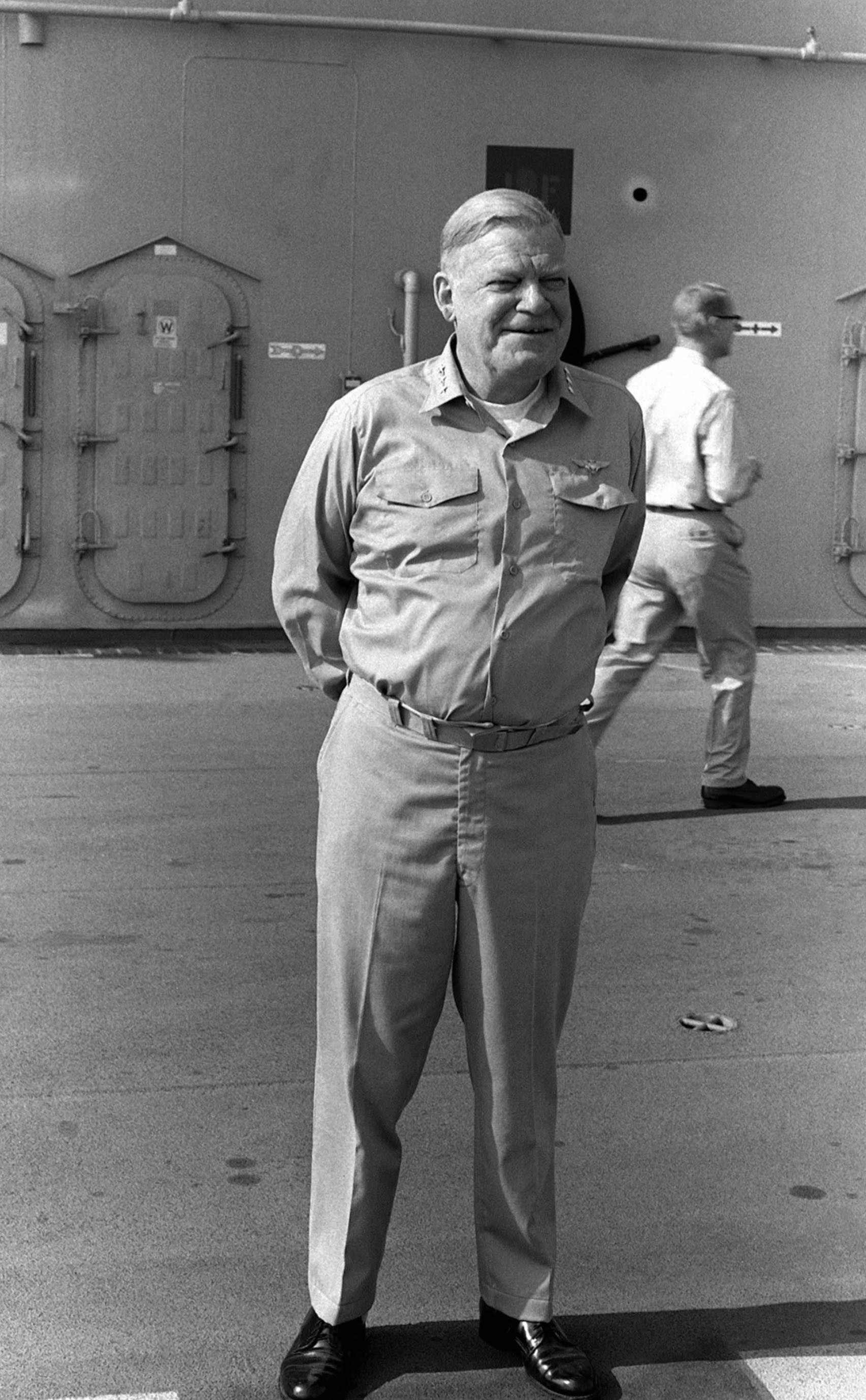
- Slattery as William F. Halsey in The Winds of War
- Born: Richard Xavier Slattery; June 26, 1925; The Bronx, New York, U.S.
- Died: January 27, 1997 (aged 71); Los Angeles, California, U.S.
- Occupation: Actor
- Years active: 1960–1990
- Children: 5

Richard Xavier Slattery (June 26, 1925 – January 27, 1997) was an American character actor in film, theater, and television. He appeared in films such as A Distant Trumpet, The Boston Strangler, Walking Tall, The No Mercy Man, and Herbie Rides Again.

== Early years ==
Born in New York City, Slattery was a graduate of All Hallows High School, who briefly studied at Fordham University, where he had scholarships in track and football. He left Fordham and enlisted in the United States Army Air Forces during World War II, serving as a lieutenant in the Pacific for two and a half years. He was awarded the American Campaign Medal, the Asiatic-Pacific Campaign Medal, and the World War II Victory Medal.

== Career ==
Slattery was distinguished by a square-jawed look and a rough, gravelly voice that made him ideal as a "tough guy" character, usually as a cop or a drill sergeant type. He had been an NYPD police officer for 12 years (1948–1960) and started his acting career in police academy training films, and in community theater in the Bronx.

Slattery was a familiar face on series television during the 1960s through the 1980s, appearing in numerous guest roles, including Route 66, The Alfred Hitchcock Hour, Gunsmoke, 77 Sunset Strip, Rawhide, The Andy Griffith Show, Bewitched, F Troop, Bonanza, The Invaders, The Green Hornet, The Virginian, The Partridge Family, Ironside, The Odd Couple, Owen Marshall, Counselor at Law, Cannon, Barnaby Jones, I Dream of Jeannie,The Mod Squad, Emergency!, Run, Joe, Run, The Waltons, Kojak, The San Pedro Beach Bums, and Knight Rider.

Slattery starred in a revival of the play The Time of Your Life, starting March 17, 1972, at the Huntington Hartford Theater in Los Angeles.

For 14 years, Slattery was featured in a series of popular TV commercials for 76 gasoline during the 1970s and early 1980s, playing Murph, the grandfatherly owner of "Murph's 76 Station" (filmed at the longtime 76 gas station adjacent to Dodger Stadium in Los Angeles). He played Lieutenant Modeen in Switch and had featured roles in three series: The Gallant Men (as First Sgt. John McKenna), Mister Roberts (as Captain John Morton), and C.P.O. Sharkey (as Captain "Buck" Buckner).

== Personal life ==
Slattery was married to Pegeen Rose, an actress, from 1958 to 1968. They had five children. He married Mary Shelquist in 1970 and they divorced in 1979. He married Helene Irene Vergauwen in 1988 and they remained married until his death. His son Kevin is a television producer (Just Shoot Me).

== Death ==
Slattery died on January 27, 1997, at the Motion Picture and Television Hospital in Woodland Hills, California. The official cause of death was listed as a stroke.

== Filmography ==
Year	Title	Role	Notes
1946	Till the End of Time	Captain	Uncredited
1960	Butterfield 8	State Trooper	Uncredited
1961	The Last Time I Saw Archie	Sergeant in Mess Hall	Uncredited
1964	A Distant Trumpet	Sgt. Fry	
1966	The Green Hornet	Steve Grant	
1967	A Time for Killing	Cpl. Paddy Darling	
1968	The Secret War of Harry Frigg	MP Sergeant	
1968	The Boston Strangler	Det. Capt. Ed Willis	
1973	The No Mercy Man	Mark Hand	
1973	Walking Tall	Arno Purdy	
1974	Herbie Rides Again	Traffic Commissioner	
1974	Busting	Desk Sergeant	
1974	Black Eye	Lt. Bill Bowen	
1976	Zebra Force	Charlie DeSantis	
1979	The Apple Dumpling Gang Rides Again	Sgt. Slaughter - Head Soldier	
1983	The Winds of War	Admiral William F. (Bull) Halsey	
