= Expiration date =

Last date to sell or use something

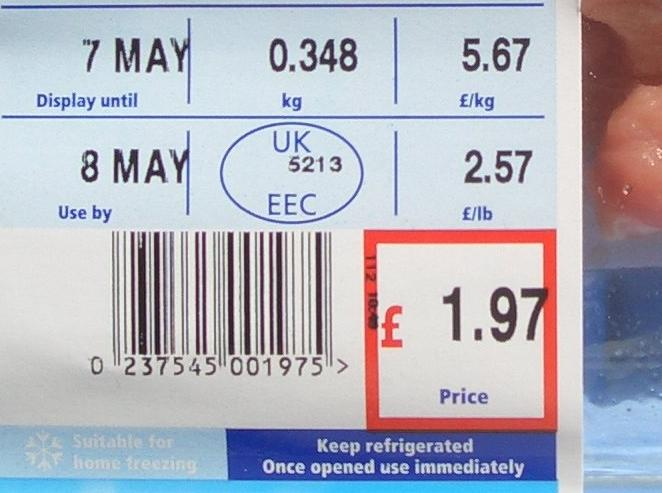
"Display until" and "use by" expiration dates on a meat product in the United Kingdom

An expiration date or expiry date is a previously determined date after which something should no longer be used, either by operation of law or by exceeding the anticipated shelf life for perishable goods. Expiration dates are applied to some food products and other products like infant car seats where the age of the product may affect its safe use.

The legal definition and usage of terms varies between countries and products. Different terms may be used for products that tend to spoil and those that tend to be shelf-stable. Use by is often applied to products such as milk and meat that are more likely to spoil and can become dangerous to those eating them. Such products should not be consumed past the date shown. Best before is often applied to products that may deteriorate slightly in quality, but are unlikely to become dangerous as a result, such as dried foods. Such products can be eaten after their Best before date at the discretion of the consumer. Storage and handling conditions will affect whether and when an item will spoil, so there is inherent variability in dating.

A time temperature indicator is a sensing label or device that indicates whether a product has been exposed to dangerously high or low temperatures. These indicators are often used for determining whether a product is spoiled due to external factors regardless of the expiration date.

Arbitrary expiration dates are also commonly applied by companies to product coupons, promotional offers and credit cards. In these contexts, the expiration date is chosen for business reasons or to provide some security function rather than any product safety concern. Expiration date is often abbreviated EXP or ED.

== Terms ==
=== Use by ===
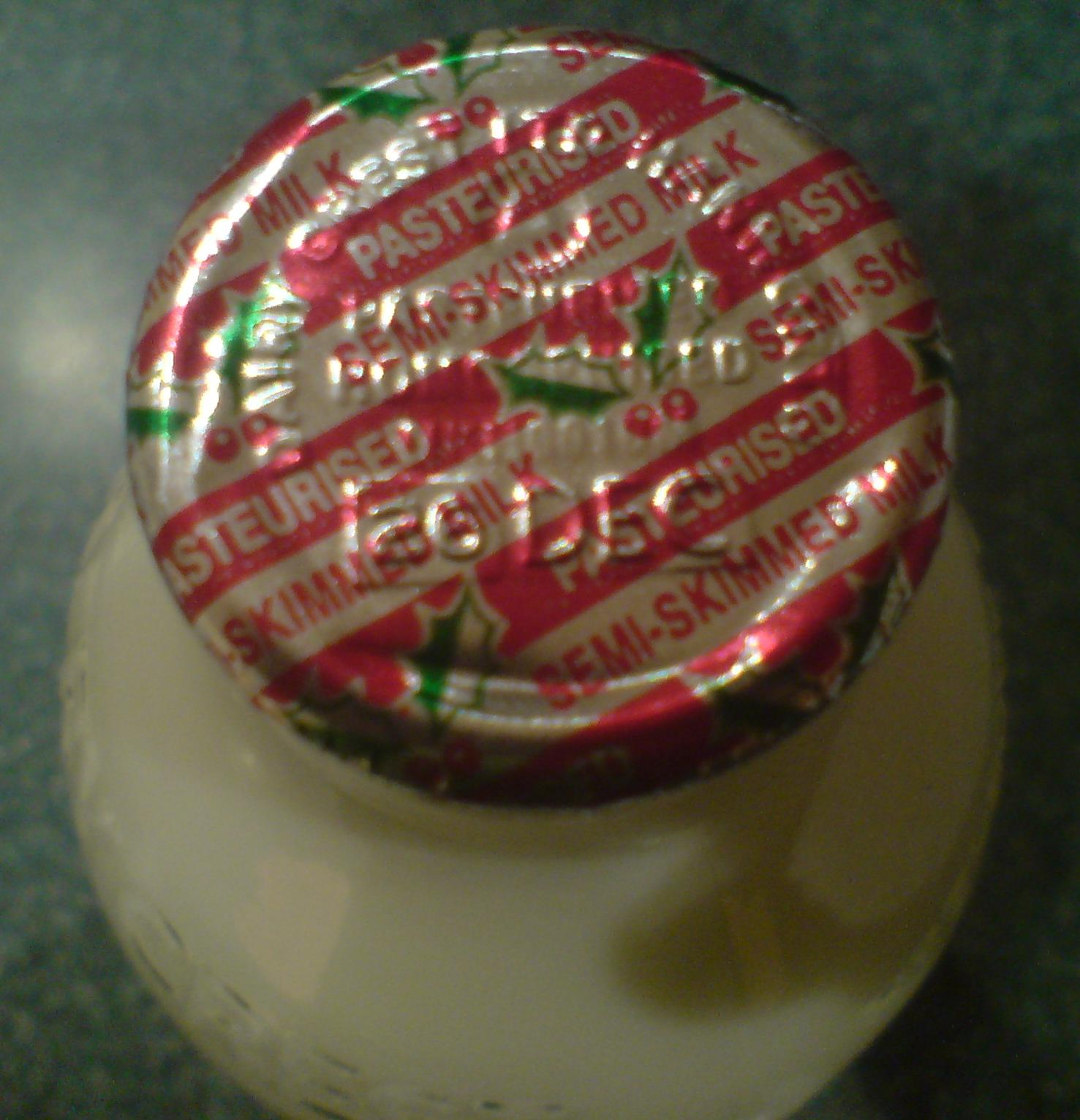
A foil milk bottle top from the UK displays a use by date of 26 December pressed into the foil to indicate that the food may spoil and be unsafe after that date.

Generally, foods that have a use by date written on the packaging should not be eaten after the specified date. This term is generally applied to foods that may go bad due to physical instability, chemical spoilage, bacterial spoilage, pathogenic spoilage, or other factors that can make the food injurious to health. Milk, meat, fish and eggs are all subject to spoilage. Such foods should be thrown away if past their use by date or if showing signs of deterioration such as changes in smell or color. Fruits, vegetables, breads and other baked goods can also spoil, but may be less likely to become dangerous. It is important to follow storage and preparation instructions carefully for perishable foods. Some products may require refrigeration. Others may need to be cooked to particular temperatures.

Most U.S. expiration dates are used as guidelines based on normal and expected handling and exposure to temperature. Use prior to the expiration date does not guarantee the safety of a food or drug, and a product is not necessarily dangerous or ineffective after the expiration date. According to the United States Department of Agriculture, "High-acid canned foods (e.g. tomatoes and fruits) will keep their best quality for 12 to 18 months. Whereas, low-acid canned foods (e.g. meats and vegetables) will keep for two to five years."

Expiration dates for infant formula should not be ignored. If formula is stored too long, it may lose its nutritional value.

The expiration date of pharmaceuticals specifies the date the manufacturer guarantees the full potency and safety of a drug. Most medications continue to be effective and safe for a time after the expiration date. A rare exception is a case of renal tubular acidosis purportedly caused by expired tetracycline. A study conducted by the U.S. Food and Drug Administration covered over 100 drugs, prescription and over-the-counter. The study showed that about 90% of them were safe and effective as long as 15 years past their expiration dates. Joel Davis, a former FDA expiration-date compliance chief, said that with a handful of exceptions - notably nitroglycerin, insulin and some liquid antibiotics - most expired drugs are probably effective.

=== Best before ===
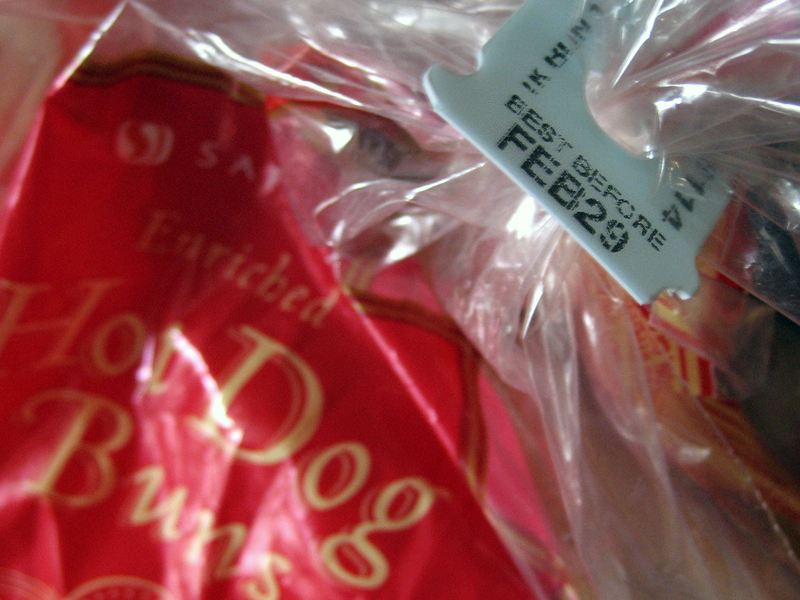
A tag sealing a bag of hot dog buns displays a best before date of February 29.

Best before or best by dates appear on a wide range of frozen, dried, tinned and other foods. These dates are advisory and refer to the quality of the product, in contrast with use by dates, which may indicate that the product may no longer be safe to consume after the specified date. Food kept after the best before date will not necessarily be harmful, but may begin to lose its optimum flavour and texture.

Eggs can be a special case, since they may contain salmonella which multiplies over time; they should therefore be eaten before the best before date. In Britain, this is 21 days from when they were laid. In the USA, this is a maximum of 45 days after the eggs are packed. Quality of the eggs will degrade over time, due to a variety of factors. As a result, some prefer to use fresher eggs for eating and eggs a few days old for cooking.

Sometimes the packaging process involves using pre-printed labels, making it impractical to write the best before date in a clearly visible location. In this case, wording like best before see bottom or best before see lid might be printed on the label and the date marked in a different location as indicated.

=== Best if used by ===
Best if used by/before is a date which is commonly found on labels of meat, egg, or poultry products. The stated date specifies how long the product will be of top quality or taste. The United States Food and Drug Administration (FDA) reinforces a push by the food industry to make Best if used by the normal wording to show the date when a product will keep its best quality until.

Although United States federal law does not require product food dating, the Food Safety and Inspection Service (FSIS) oversees meat, egg, and poultry products where dates are voluntarily put on in a genuine way to follow the rules of the FSIS.

=== Open dating ===
Open dating is the use of a date stamped on the package of a food product to help determine how long to display the product for sale. This benefits the consumer by ensuring that the product is of best quality when sold. An open date does not supersede a use-by date, if shown, which should still be followed.

Bathroom products and toiletries usually state a time in months from the date the product is opened, by which they should be used. This is often indicated by a graphic of an open tub, with the number of months written inside (e.g., "12M" means use the product within 12 months of opening). Similarly, some food products say "eat within X days of opening".

=== Sell by ===
Sell by date is a less ambiguous term for what is often referred to as an "expiration date". Most food is still edible after the expiration date. A product that has passed its shelf life might still be safe, but quality is no longer guaranteed. In most food stores, waste is minimized by using stock rotation, which involves moving products with the earliest sell by date from the warehouse to the sales area, and then to the front of the shelf, so that most shoppers will pick them up first and thus they are likely to be sold before the end of their shelf life. This is important, as consumers enjoy fresher goods, and furthermore some stores can be fined for selling out of date products; most if not all would have to mark such products down as wasted, resulting in a financial loss.

== Food waste ==
According to the UK Waste & Resources Action Programme (WRAP), 33% of all food produced is wasted along the cold chain or by the consumer. Conversely, spoiled foods sicken a large number of people annually. According to the WHO and CDC, every year in the USA there are 76 million foodborne illnesses, leading to 325,000 hospitalizations and 5,000 deaths.

According to former UK minister Hilary Benn, the use by date and sell-by dates are old technologies that are outdated and should be replaced by other solutions or disposed of altogether. The UK government's Department for Environment, Food and Rural Affairs revised guidance in 2011 to exclude the use of sell-by dates. The guidance was prepared in consultation with the food industry, consumer groups, regulators, and Waste & Resources Action Programme (WRAP). It aims to reduce the annual £12bn of wasted supermarket food.

Due to confusion caused by the many types of expiration date labels, as much as 20% of unspoiled food is thrown out by households in developed countries.

Voluntary industry guidelines announced in 2017 from the Grocery Manufacturers Association and the Food Marketing Institute recommend using only "best if used by" or "use by", to avoid confusion that leads to food waste. In 2019, the Food and Drug Administration urged food manufacturers to adopt the voluntary standards.

The removal of date-labeling and terms such as best if used by, expired by, and use by could potentially reduce food waste from certain food products and groups.

== Regulation ==
=== Canada ===
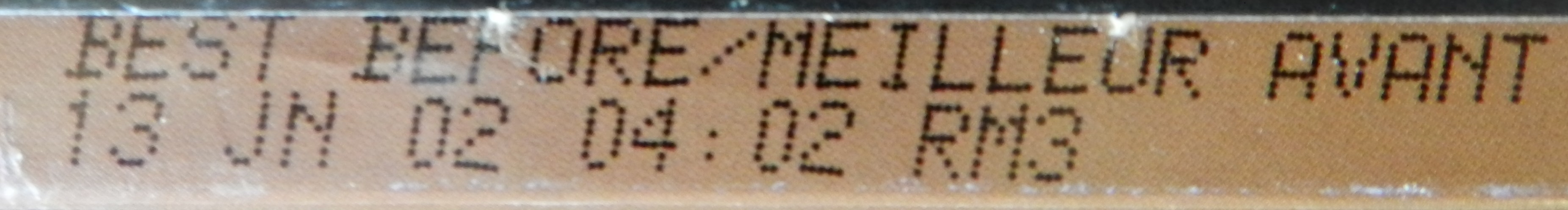
A best before date used on the bottom of a box in Canada

The Canadian Food Inspection Agency produces a Guide to Food Labelling and Advertising which sets out a "Durable Life Date". The authority for producing the guide comes from the Food and Drugs Act. The guide sets out what items must be labelled and the format of the date. The month and day must be included, and the year if necessary. The format must be year/month/day (with 2- or 4-digit year).

An expiration date on food differs from a best-before date. According to the Canadian Food Inspection Agency "Expiration dates are required only on certain foods that have strict compositional and nutritional specifications which might not be met after the expiration date."

In Canada expiration dates must be used on the following food items (list and comments copied from CFIA website):

- formulated liquid diets (nutritionally complete diets for people using oral or tube feeding methods)
- foods represented for use in a very low-energy diet (foods sold only by a pharmacist and only with a written order from a physician)
- meal replacements (formulated food that, by itself, can replace one or more daily meals)
- nutritional supplements (food sold or represented as a supplement to a diet that may be inadequate in energy and essential nutrients)
- human milk substitutes (infant formula)

The concern is that after the expiration date has passed, the food may not have the same nutrient content as specified on the packaging and for the listed regulated products, the nutritional content is quite important. The CFIA recommends that food should be discarded and should not be bought, sold or eaten beyond the stated expiration date. This contrasts with a best before date which is an indication of how long properly stored prepackaged food is expected to retain its "freshness, taste, nutritional value, or any other qualities claimed by the manufacturer". Passing a best before date is not necessarily a reason to discard the food. "Sell by" and "manufactured on" dates are related concepts that may guide the consumer.

Non-food items may also carry an expiration date. For example, in Canada, all children are required to be secured in an infant car seat while in a motor vehicle that is in motion. Users are required by law to follow manufacturer's directions. There is no specific law that requires an expiration date, but all Transport Canada approved car seats sold in Canada carry a manufacturer applied expiration date that ranges between 6 and 9 years from date of manufacture. The rationale is that car seats are subjected to heat, cold, sun exposure, abuse by the children, and long term storage between children, all of which can degrade the structure and function of the car seat and fail in a crash. Further, beyond the expiration date the manufacturer will no longer be monitoring the safety of the seat through testing. Transport Canada advises to destroy an expired car seat and dispose of it at a landfill or recycling facility, and never to give an expired seat to someone else or to charity.

Medicine and other types of Medication are mandatory by Health Canada to have expiry dates, plus it's also required by pharmacies.

=== European Union ===
In the EU food quality dates are governed by Regulation (EU) 1169/2011, "On the Provision of Food Information to Consumers".

As of 2020, the European Food Safety Authority outlined a risk-based approach for food business operators (FBO) to use in deciding the type of date marking to be used on different types of products, (i.e. "best before" date or "use by" date), determining a desirable shelf-life (i.e. time) and identifying relevant content to be put on food labels to ensure food safety.

==== Germany ====
In Germany, practices differentiate between the "Mindesthaltbarkeitsdatum" (MHD), roughly minimum shelf-life and "Verbrauchsdatum", which is more in line with the common expiry date. Products that spoil quickly, such as minced meat, have to be given a Verbrauchsdatum and are barred from sale upon expiry. Other products are given Mindesthaltbarkeitsdatum, which is set by the individual producers of said product and do not bar the product from being sold past the date determined. Products with an expired MHD may be sold if the seller is satisfied that the goods are in perfect condition. Accordingly, it follows that the customer is not entitled to compensation if he unintentionally acquires a product with an expired shelf life, provided that the product can still be regarded as faultless. Neither the MHD nor the Verbrauchsdatum provide legal rights if a product is no longer fit for consumption before the indicated date and the manufacturer can prove the credibility of his claims.

The MHD has been criticized for possibly causing food waste. For example, the then Minister Christian Schmidt complained that many still edible foods with an expired MHD would be thrown away by consumers who would misunderstand the MHD as an expiration date.

=== Hong Kong ===
In Hong Kong, prepackaged food which from the microbiological point of view is highly perishable and is therefore likely after a short period to constitute an immediate danger to human health, are required to use the "Use by" label instead of the "Best before" label. Examples include pasteurised fresh milk, packed egg and ham sandwiches, etc. Dates are usually presented in the DD MM YY (or YYYY) format.

=== United Kingdom ===
Until 1980 there was no legal requirement for food to be labelled with date information, although some retailers had long been using dates, often in coded form not intelligible to purchasers, to help with stock control.

The United Kingdom first introduced legislation in 1980 when the Food Labelling Regulations harmonized UK law with the 1979 EC Labelling Directive (79/112/EC), which required a "date of minimum durability" – the "best-before" date – but allowed its member states to use their own terms, thus allowing the UK to use the sell-by date. When introduced, food could be sold after this date; it was information to help consumers, not a requirement. It later became illegal to sell food past its "use-by" date.

Best practices include the labeling of foods with either a "best before" or a "use by" date so that consumers can help to ensure the safety of their food and lessen the amount of consumer food waste. Dates must be in day/month or day/month/year format. Technical expertise should be hired for regular end-of-shelf-life safety and quality testing. Shelf life trials should be conducted using the same ingredients, equipment, procedures and manufacturing environment as will be used during production.

=== United States ===
Sale of expired food products, per se, is lightly regulated in the US. Some states restrict or forbid the sale of expired products, require expiration dates on all perishable products, or both, while other states do not. However, sale of contaminated food is generally illegal, and may result in product liability litigation if consumption of the food results in injury.

In the United States, printing "sell by" or "best if used by" dates on food packages (also known as "open dating") became widespread in the early 1970s due to consumer advocacy. Retailers had used "closed dating" labels for many products to manage inventory turnover that ensured fresh products. In the late 1960s, housewife activists famously exposed secret store codes for product freshness, pressuring major supermarkets to start stamping readable freshness dates on products. By 1972, many chains had adopted open dating in response to this public demand. Notably, no uniform federal law mandates were passed for food expiration dates (except for infant formula), but the grassroots push led to voluntary dating practices nationwide. These early consumer protection efforts around labeling freshness information are credited with making expiration dates a standard industry practice in the U.S.

The Food and Drug Administration in the United States notes that "[a] principle of U.S. food law is that foods in U.S. commerce must be wholesome and fit for consumption". However, with the exception of infant formula, the United States government does not require or specify uniform terminology for use on food labels, the use of date labeling is entirely at the discretion of the manufacturer, and dates on labels do not indicate product safety. U.S. law does state that labels should be truthful and not misleading. Specific foods may be subject to regulations from the Food Safety and Inspection Service.

With the exception of infant formula, the laws that the Food and Drug Administration (FDA) administers do not preclude the sale of food that is past the expiration date indicated on the label. FDA does not require food firms to place terms such as expired by, use by and best before dates on food products. This information is entirely at the discretion of the manufacturer.

After losing a lawsuit, pharmacy chain CVS implemented a system that causes its registers to recognize expired products and avert their sale.

The United States Department of Agriculture (USDA), which regulates fresh poultry and meats, only requires labeling of the date when poultry is packed. However, many manufacturers also voluntarily add sell-by or use-by dates.

== Beer ==
=== Freshness date ===
A freshness date is the date used in the American brewing industry to indicate either the date the beer was bottled or the date before which the beer should be consumed.

Beer is perishable. It can be affected by light, air, or the action of bacteria. Although beer is not legally mandated in the United States to have a shelf life, freshness dates serve much the same purpose and are used as a marketing tool.

=== Beginnings of freshness dating ===
General Brewing Company of San Francisco marketed their Lucky Lager Beer as "Age Dated" as early as late 1935. They stamped a date on each can lid to indicate that the beer was brewed before that date. This was not to ensure that the beer was "fresh" but to ensure that it had been aged properly. So many breweries had rushed beer to market before it was ready when Prohibition ended, that customers were wary of getting "green" beer. The Boston Beer Company, maker of Samuel Adams, was among the first contemporary brewers to start adding freshness dates to their product line in 1985. For ten years there was a slow growth in brewers adding freshness dates to their beer. The practice grew in popularity after the Anheuser-Busch company's "Born-On dates" starting in 1996. Many other brewers have started adding freshness dates to their products, but there is no standard for what the date means. For some companies, the date on the bottle or can will be the date that the beer was bottled; others have the date by which the beer should be consumed.

== See also ==
- Teleology - a branch of causality giving the reason or an explanation for something as a function of its end
