= Lucky International Open =

Golf tournament

Coordinates: 37.724°N 122.493°W

San Francisco Open Invitational
Tournament information
- Location: San Francisco, California
- Established: 1961
- Course: Harding Park Golf Club
- Par: 71
- Length: 6,677 yards (6,105 m)
- Tour: PGA Tour
- Format: Stroke play
- Month played: October
- Final year: 1969

Tournament record score
- Aggregate: 269 Billy Casper (1968); 269 Steve Spray (1969)
- To par: −15 as above

Final champion
- (United States) Steve Spray
- Location in the United States Location in California

The Lucky International Open was a PGA Tour event in the 1960s in San Francisco, California. It was played at Harding Park Golf Club, a public course across Lake Merced from the more glamorous Olympic Club. One of the founders and sponsors of the Lucky International Open was Eugene Selvage, owner of the Lucky Lager Brewing Company.

Following surgery on his hands the previous summer, San Francisco native Ken Venturi won his 14th and final PGA Tour event here in January 1966, taking the first prize of $8,500 with his parents in the gallery. The deteriorating conditions and antiquated facilities at Harding Park caused the PGA Tour to leave at the end of the decade.

The final edition in 1969 was played in late October without the Lucky name and had a winner's share of $20,000. Steve Spray gained his only tour victory, one stroke ahead of runner-up Chi-Chi Rodríguez, the playoff winner in January 1964.

For its first six years, it was played in late January, the week after the Bing Crosby National Pro-Am at Pebble Beach. Not played in 1967, it was held in mid-autumn in 1968 and 1969.

Of the eight winners, six were major champions; five already and George Archer (1965) won his at the 1969 Masters.

== Winners ==
Year	Winner	Score	To par	Margin of victory	Runner(s)-up	Winner's share ($)	Ref.
San Francisco Open Invitational
1969	(United States) Steve Spray	269	−15	1 stroke	(United States) Chi-Chi Rodríguez	20,000	
Lucky International Open
1968	(United States) Billy Casper	269	−15	4 strokes	(United States) Raymond Floyd (United States) Don Massengale	20,000	
1967: No tournament
1966	(United States) Ken Venturi	273	−11	1 stroke	(United States) Frank Beard	8,500	
1965	(United States) George Archer	278	−6	Playoff	(New Zealand) Bob Charles	8,500	
1964	(United States) Chi-Chi Rodríguez	272	−12	Playoff	(United States) Don January	7,500	
1963	(United States) Jack Burke Jr.	276	−8	3 strokes	(United States) Don January	9,000	
1962	(United States) Gene Littler	274	−10	2 strokes	(Canada) George Knudson	9,000	
1961	(South Africa) Gary Player	272	−12	2 strokes	(United States) George Bayer (United States) Don Whitt	9,000	
