= King Snedley's Beer =

American beer brand

King Snedley's Beer was a beer brand briefly produced by Lucky Lager in the 1970s.

The brand was an attempt to recapture younger drinkers who were losing interest in Lucky Lager. The whimsical advertising portrayed Snedley as the King of Hopland, where the royal family was dedicated to brewing good beer. There is no agreement over whether the beer was simply a repackaging of Lucky Lager.

Due to the short time the brand was on sale, its cans are now collectible. There were later reissues of the cans, complicating the collectibility.

"Look for the royal family on the can." was the tag line in radio advertisements of the day.

The campaign was created by a small boutique agency called Prancer, Dancer, Donner and Blitzen which was headquartered on a boat in Marina del Rey, California. The alternate tagline developed, but not used was "The king would rather brew than screw."
