= Beyond the Valley of the Dolls =

1970 film by Russ Meyer

- Theatrical release poster
- Directed by: Russ Meyer
- Screenplay by: Roger Ebert
- Story by: Roger Ebert; Russ Meyer
- Produced by: Russ Meyer
- Starring: Dolly Read; Cynthia Myers; Marcia McBroom; John LaZar; Michael Blodgett; David Gurian; Edy Williams
- Cinematography: Fred J. Koenekamp
- Edited by: Dann Cahn; Dick Wormel
- Music by: Stu Phillips
- Distributed by: Twentieth Century-Fox
- Release date: June 17, 1970 (Los Angeles)
- Running time: 109 minutes
- Country: United States
- Language: English
- Budget: $900,000 or $2.09 million
- Box office: $9 million

Beyond the Valley of the Dolls is a 1970 American satirical musical melodrama film starring Dolly Read, Cynthia Myers, Marcia McBroom, Phyllis Davis, John LaZar, Michael Blodgett, Erica Gavin, and David Gurian. The film was directed by Russ Meyer and written by Roger Ebert from a story by Ebert and Meyer.

Originally intended as a direct sequel to the 1967 film Valley of the Dolls, Beyond the Valley of the Dolls was instead revised as a satirical extension of the original. Beyond was met with negative reviews upon its initial release, but it became a box office success. The film developed a cult following in subsequent decades and has since earned critical reappraisal for its satirical and metafictional elements.

== Plot ==
Three young women—Kelly MacNamara, Casey Anderson, and Petronella "Pet" Danforth—perform in a rock band, the Kelly Affair, managed by Harris Allsworth, Kelly's boyfriend. The four travel to Los Angeles to find Kelly's estranged aunt, Susan Lake, heiress to a family fortune. After Susan promises Kelly a third of her inheritance, Porter Hall, her sleazy financial advisor, discredits Kelly as a "hippie" to dissuade Susan from dividing the fortune he secretly wants to embezzle.

Undeterred, Susan introduces the Kelly Affair to a flamboyant, well-connected rock producer, Ronnie "Z-Man" Barzell, who coaxes them into an impromptu performance at one of his parties (after a set by the real-life band Strawberry Alarm Clock). The band is so well-received that Z-Man becomes their svengali manager, changing their name to the Carrie Nations and starting a long-simmering feud with Harris.

Kelly drifts away from Harris and dates Lance Rocke, a high-priced gigolo, who has his own designs on her inheritance. After losing Kelly, Harris is seduced by the sexually aggressive porn star Ashley St. Ives. She soon tires of his conventional nature and waning libido due to increasing drug and alcohol intake. Harris's further descent into drug and alcohol use leads to a fistfight with Lance and a one-night stand with Casey, which results in pregnancy. Kelly ends her affair with Lance after he severely beats Harris.

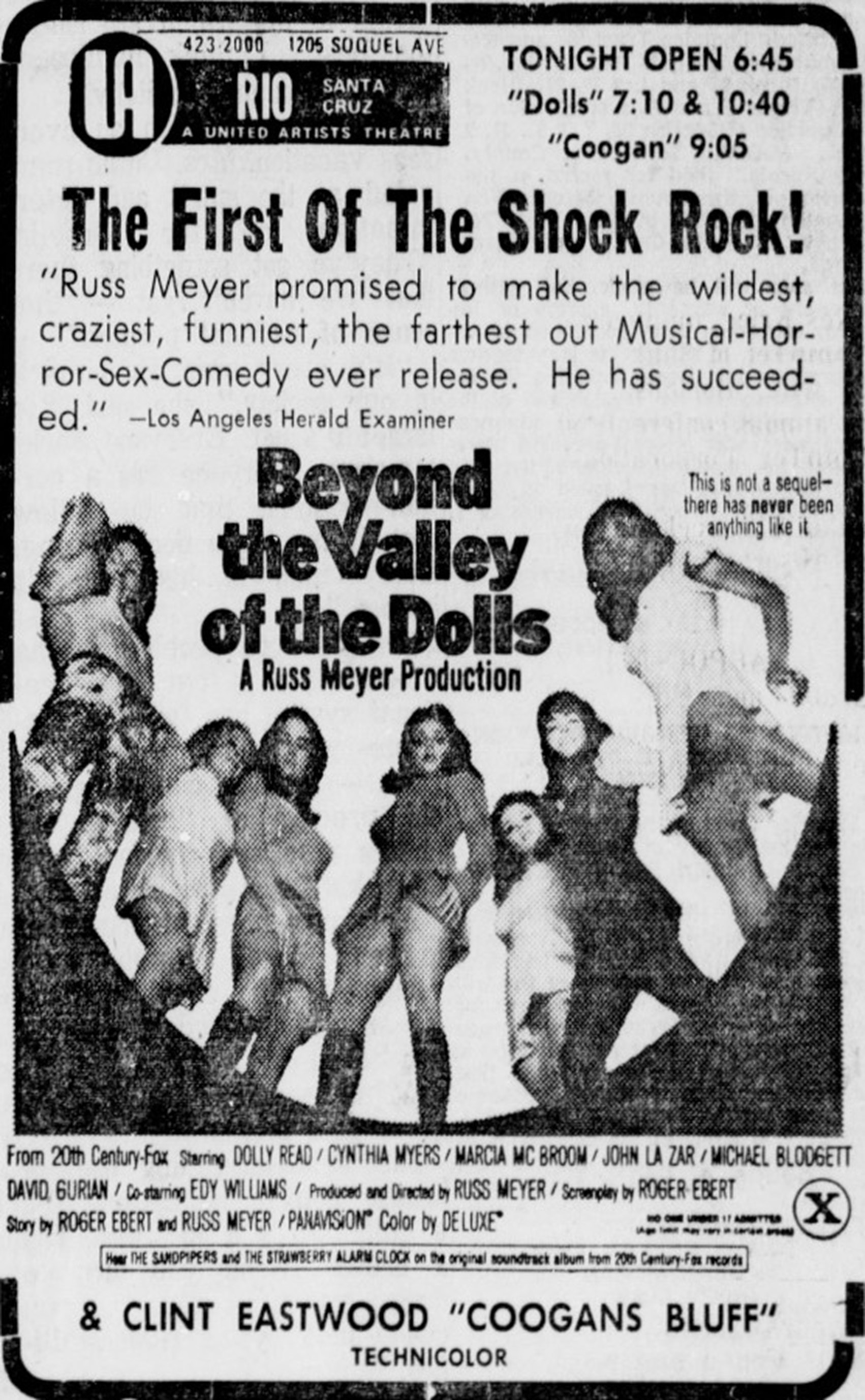
Advertisement from 1970

Casey, distraught at getting pregnant and wary of men's foibles, has a lesbian affair with fashion designer Roxanne, who pressures her to have an abortion. Pet has a seemingly enchanted romance with law student Emerson Thorne after a meet cute at one of Z-Man's parties. Their fairy-tale romance frays when Pet sleeps with Randy Black, a violent prize fighter who beats up Emerson and tries to run him down with a car.

Porter offers Kelly $50,000 to relinquish any claim to Susan's inheritance. When Kelly angrily rejects his offer at one of Z-Man's parties, Susan learns of his underhanded ploy and severs her ties with him.

The Carrie Nations release several records despite constant touring and drug use. Upset at being pushed to the sidelines, Harris attempts suicide by leaping from the rafters of a sound stage during a television appearance by the band. Harris survives the fall but becomes paraplegic from his injuries.

Kelly devotes herself to caring for Harris, and Emerson forgives Pet for her infidelity. Casey and Roxanne share a tender romance, and Susan Lake is reunited with her former fiancé, Baxter Wolfe. This idyllic existence ends when Z-Man invites Casey, Roxanne, and Lance to a psychedelic-fueled party at his house. After Z-Man tries to seduce Lance, who spurns him, he reveals that he has breasts and is a female in drag. (Note: To quote Roger Ebert: "Readers who have seen BVD will know that Z-Man is a rock Svengali who seems to be a gay man for most of the movie, but is finally revealed to be a woman in drag".) Z-Man goes on a murderous rampage: he kills Lance with a sword, stabs his servant Otto to death, and shoots Roxanne and Casey, killing them.

Responding to a desperate phone call Casey made shortly before her death, Kelly, Harris, Pet, and Emerson arrive at Z-Man's house to subdue him. Pet is wounded in the melee, which ends in Z-Man's death. Harris is able to move his feet, which is the start of his recovery from paralysis. Three couples—Kelly and Harris, Pet and Emerson, and Susan and Baxter—wed while Porter watches from outside the courthouse window.

== Cast ==
- Dolly Read as Kelly MacNamara
- Cynthia Myers as Casey Anderson
- Marcia McBroom as Petronella Danforth
- John LaZar as Ronnie "Z-Man" Barzell
- Michael Blodgett as Lance Rocke
- David Gurian as Harris Allsworth
- Edy Williams as Ashley St. Ives
- Erica Gavin as Roxanne
- Phyllis Davis as Susan Lake
- Henry Rowland as Otto
- Harrison Page as Emerson Thorne
- Duncan McLeod as Porter Hall
- James Iglehart as Randy Black
- Charles Napier as Baxter Wolfe
- Strawberry Alarm Clock as themselves

== Production ==
=== Development ===
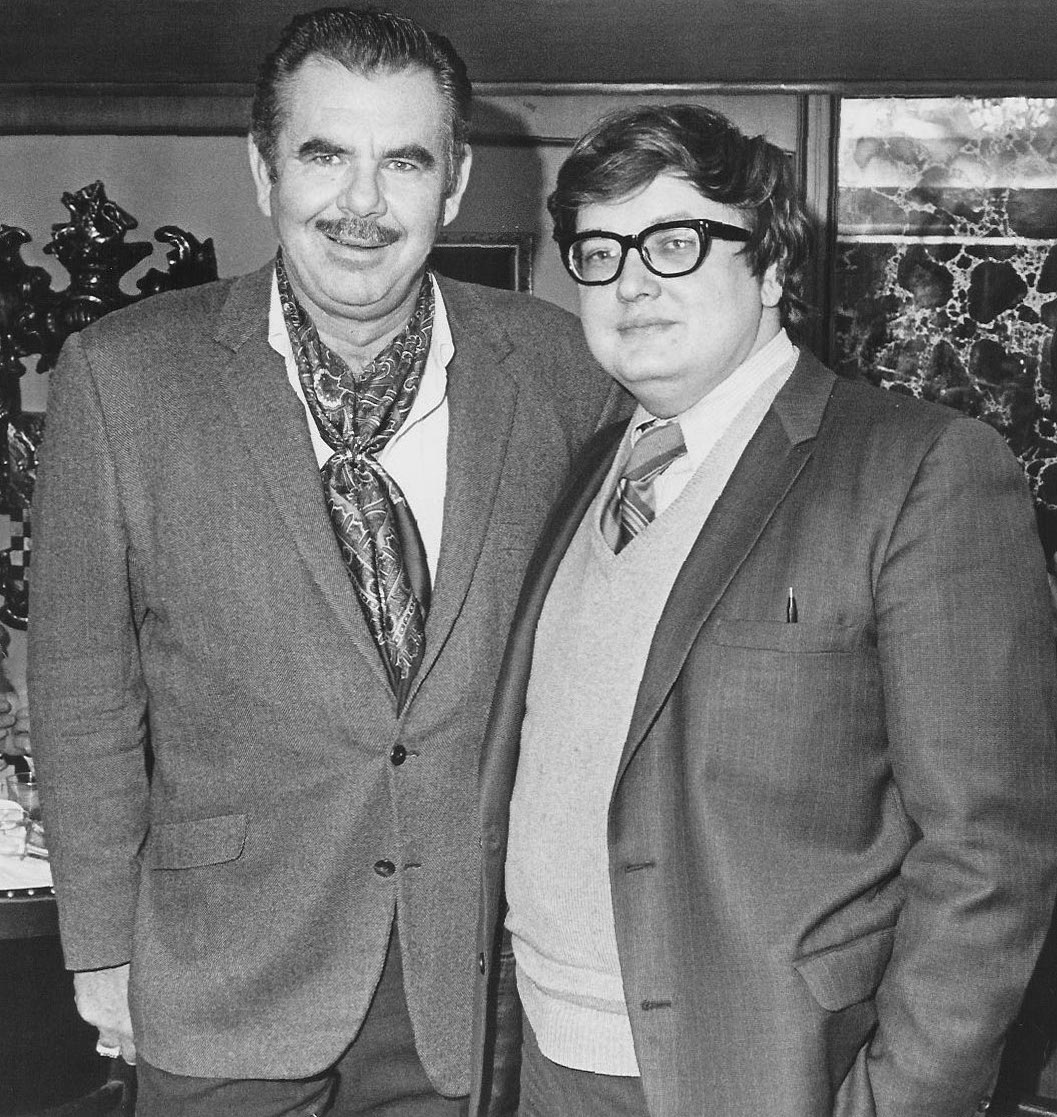
Russ Meyer and Roger Ebert (right) in 1970

Beyond the Valley of the Dolls was originally intended as a straightforward sequel to the 1967 film Valley of the Dolls. Jacqueline Susann, author of the novel Valley of the Dolls, had come up with the title while she was writing her second novel The Love Machine. Susann wrote a treatment for Beyond the Valley of the Dolls, and by June 1968, Fox wanted Valley of the Dolls screenwriter Dorothy Kingsley to return to write the new film. However, Kingsley was unavailable and busy on Bracken's World. In November, it was reported that Barbara Parkins would return in the film, but Patty Duke and Sharon Tate would not.

In June 1969, Fox announced the film would be made in the next 18 months and would come from Irving Mansfield Productions; Irving Mansfield was the husband and agent of Jacqueline Susann. A script was written by Jean Holloway.

Two months later, Fox decided that Mansfield would no longer make the film. Instead, they hired Russ Meyer, whose recent X-rated independent movie Vixen! had been a commercial success. Holloway's script was discarded, and the film critic Roger Ebert, a friend of Meyer's, took a five-week leave of absence from the Chicago Sun-Times to write a script. Parkins was no longer attached to the film. Meyer said Richard Zanuck, head of Fox, gave him a weekend to come up with an idea of how it could be done, "stressing budget strongly in line with the whole ideas of making movies more cheaply" and encouraging him to "make an R film smashing against an X rating".

=== Script ===
Meyer says he and Ebert wrote a 127-page treatment in 10 days and the script in three weeks. Neither of them had read the novel, but they watched the 1967 film and used the same formula: "Three young girls come to Hollywood, find fame and fortune, are threatened by sex, violence, and drugs, and either do or do not win redemption", according to Ebert. He later added: "We would include some of the sensational elements of the original story—homosexuality, crippling diseases, characters based on 'real' people, events out of recent headlines—but, again, with flat-out exaggeration".

The script was not only a spoof of the original film but also, in Ebert's words, "a satire of Hollywood conventions, genres, situations, dialogue, characters, and success formulas, heavily overlaid with such shocking violence that some critics didn't know whether the movie 'knew' it was a comedy".

Ebert said the plot was derived in collaboration "by creating characters and then working out situations to cover the range of exploitable content we wanted in the film. Meyer wanted the film to appeal, in some way, to almost anyone who was under thirty and went to the movies. There had to be music, mod clothes, black characters, violence, romantic love, soap opera situations, behind-the-scenes intrigue, fantastic sets, lesbians, orgies, drugs and (eventually) an ending that tied everything together".

Meyer's intention was for the film to "simultaneously be a satire, a serious melodrama, a rock musical, a comedy, a violent exploitation picture, a skin flick, and a moralistic expose (so soon after the Sharon Tate murders) of what the opening crawl called 'the oft-times nightmarish world of Show Business'".

Meyer submitted the script to Richard Zanuck at Fox in September, and Zanuck greenlit the film. Meyer said when Fox offered him the film, "I felt like I had pulled off the biggest caper in the world". He described the film as "a soap opera for young people, a cornocopia of wild, way-out now entertainment". Ebert later recalled:

At the time we were working on BVD I didn't really understand how unusual the project was. But in hindsight I can recognize that the conditions of its making were almost miraculous. An independent X-rated filmmaker and an inexperienced screenwriter were brought into a major studio and given carte blanche to turn out a satire of one of the studio's own hits. And BVD was made at a time when the studio's own fortunes were so low that the movie was seen almost fatalistically, as a gamble that none of the more respectable studio executives really wanted to think about, so that there was a minimum of supervision (or even cognizance) from the Front Office.

=== Character influences ===
Roger Ebert revealed that many of the film's themes and characters were based upon real people and events, but because neither Ebert nor Russ Meyer actually met these people, their characterizations were based on pure speculation.

- Ronnie "Z-Man" Barzell – the fictional eccentric rock producer turned Carrie Nations manager was loosely based on real-life producer Phil Spector. More than three decades later, Spector was convicted of murder after the body of Lana Clarkson was found at his mansion, which is somewhat reminiscent of the events of the film's climax.
- Randy Black – the heavyweight champ character was loosely based on the real World Heavyweight Champion Muhammad Ali.
- The climactic, violent ending, which was not in the original script, was inspired by the real-life Tate-LaBianca murders perpetrated by members of the Manson Family. The film began production on December 2, 1969, shortly after the murders, which were covered heavily by the media. Valley of the Dolls star Sharon Tate was among the murder victims, as was Jay Sebring. Vocalist Lynn Carey, who was dating Sebring and had been invited to join him the night of the Tate-LaBianca murders, refused his invitation, according to her comments on the DVD extras.
- Porter Hall – this scheming lawyer shares the name of a character actor who often played movie villains.
- Susan Lake and Baxter Wolfe were, in an original draft script, Anne Welles and Lyon Burke from Valley of the Dolls. Their back-story stated in BVD ("He proposed to her but it was the wrong time", "It's been three years ..."), matches the ending of the original. Following Jacqueline Susann's legal-action proceedings against 20th Century Fox, the characters were renamed and recast. Barbara Parkins, who played Anne, was originally under contract to appear in BVD and was disappointed when she was abruptly removed from the project. The special edition DVD features a screen test with Michael Blodgett and Cynthia Myers enacting the bedroom scene between Lance and Kelly. Based on an early script, the dialogue has them make reference to Anne Welles, not Susan Lake, as Kelly's Aunt.

=== Casting ===
The cast was composed almost entirely of unknowns. Meyer said that "Valley of the Dolls plus my own name will be enough".

Meyer said they would not have used Parkins if she had wanted to do the film because she was too costly to hire.

Cynthia Myers was a Playboy Playmate hired to play one of the girls who realizes she's a lesbian. In Meyer's comment: "It's a loving and tender thing. It's not The Killing of Sister George".

Edy Williams was under contract to Fox at the time.

Pam Grier made her film debut as an extra in a party scene.

=== Shooting ===
Meyer and Ebert kept the costs down by writing "97 percent of the film" for existing sets on the Fox backlot. Ebert said that Beyond the Valley of the Dolls seemed "like a movie that got made by accident when the lunatics took over the asylum". Ebert says Meyer "directed his actors with a poker face, solemnly discussing the motivations behind each scene. Some of the actors asked me whether their dialogue wasn't supposed to be humorous, but Meyer discussed it so seriously with them that they hesitated to risk offending him by voicing such a suggestion. The result is that BVD has a curious tone all of its own... from actors directed at right angles to the material".

Because the film was put together so quickly, some plot decisions, such as the character Z-Man being revealed as a woman in drag, were made on the spot, without the chance to align previous already-shot scenes with the new development. As they were shooting, the cast was uncertain whether the dialogue was intended to be comic, which would alter their approach to acting it. Because Meyer always discussed their roles and the film so seriously, they did not want to unintentionally insult him by asking, so they broached the question to Ebert instead. Meyer intended to have the actors straightforwardly perform the material because "if the actors perform as if they know they have funny lines, it won't work". Ebert described the resulting tone as "curious".

In 1980, Ebert looked back on the film and said of it:

I think of it as an essay on our generic expectations. It's an anthology of stock situations, characters, dialogue, clichés and stereotypes, set to music and manipulated to work as exposition and satire at the same time; it's cause and effect, a wind-up machine to generate emotions, pure movie without message.

=== Music and soundtrack ===
Most of the film's music was written by Stu Phillips. Phillips adapted Paul Dukas' The Sorcerer's Apprentice for the psychedelic scene at Z-Man's house near the film's end.

Members of the fictitious Carrie Nations neither sing nor play their own instruments in the film. Vocals for the lip-synced songs were performed by Lynn Carey, a blue-eyed soul singer based in Los Angeles, together with Barbara Robison, the lead singer of Peanut Butter Conspiracy. Carey's and Robison's voices are showcased on the apocalyptic rocker "Find It" (by Stu Phillips and Carey), the earnest folk anthem "Come With the Gentle People" (by Stu Phillips and Bob Stone), the raunchy R&B of "Sweet Talking Candyman" (by Phillips and Stone), the lilting ballad "In the Long Run" (by Phillips and Stone), and the soulful strut of "Look On Up At the Bottom" (also by Phillips and Stone). Carey also sings "Once I had Love", written by Stu Phillips and herself.

Strawberry Alarm Clock performed their 1967 hit "Incense and Peppermints", the mid-tempo rocker "Girl from the City" (written by Paul Marshall), and the power pop anthem "I'm Comin' Home" (also by Marshall) during the first party scene at Z-Man's house. The film's title song was performed by A&M artists The Sandpipers and is heard twice near the end of the movie. The group released the song as a single and on their 1970 Come Saturday Morning LP.

Different versions of the soundtrack album exist because of disputes over royalties. CD 'Beyond The Valley Of The Dolls / Groupie Girl - Original Film Score', produced by the label: Screen Gold Records - SGLDCD00010, does not contain the original film versions; only the new recordings for the 1970 four-song LP, the Ami Rushes sings and two songs sung entirely by Barbara "Sandi" Robison. Due to contractual reasons, Lynn Carey was not allowed to sing on the LP recording, although she co-wrote a few songs and provided vocals for the film versions, along with Barbara "Sandi Robison. So the film features the two of them, but the 1970 LP had Ami Rushes singing part of it.

However, on the 2003/4 Beyond the Valley of the Dolls CD, there are the original film versions, with Lynn Carey and Barbara "Sandi" Robison as bonus tracks. Released by the label Soundtrack Classics - SCL 1408 and Harkit Records - HRKCD 8032. The content of the songs is the same on both CDs. Both labels also released vinyl editions with different covers and extended songs compared to the 1970 LP. For the first time, all original versions of film songs are included.

Lynn Carey and Barbara Robison sang the original versions.

The CD, from the labels: Soundtrack Classics - SCL 1408 and Harkit Records - HRKCD 8032, is missing the song "Once I Had Love", which is mentioned in the credits but not heard in the film itself. So this was only released on the 1970 LP and various reprints, on vinyl, only so far in the version with Lynn Carey, from the Harkit Records label HRKLP 8402, and so far only on the CD "Beyond The Valley Of The Dolls / Groupie Girl - Original -Film soundtrack, from the label: Screen Gold Records - SGLDCD00010, in the version released with Barbara "Sandi" Robison.

The six songs, initially sung by Lynn Carey and Barbara Robison, are: "Find It", "In the Long Run", "Sweet Talkin' Candyman", "Come with the Gentle People", "Look On Up At the Bottom", and "Once I Had Love".

"Incense and Peppermints", some incidental music, and the Strawberry Alarm Clock's Hammond organ instrumental, "Toy Boy", are missing from all soundtrack releases.

== Release ==
The film had its world premiere at the Pantages Theatre in Hollywood on June 17, 1970. Jacqueline Susann, the author of the unconnected novel Valley of the Dolls, sought an injunction against its release but failed.

Initially the film was given an X rating by the MPAA; in 1990, it was reclassified as NC-17. Meyer's response to the original X rating was to attempt to re-edit the film to insert more nudity and sex, but Fox wanted to get the movie released quickly and would not give him the time.

=== Lawsuit ===
Susann sued Fox for $10 million for damaging her reputation by making the film, saying that the "sex exploitation film, employs total nudity and is scandalous of content".

As a result, the studio placed a disclaimer at the film's beginning, informing the audience that the two films were not intended to be connected. Posters for the movie read, "This is not a sequel—there has never been anything like it".

The suit did not go to trial until after Susann's death in September 1974. Her estate won a $2 million verdict against the studio in August 1975.

=== Home media ===
Beyond the Valley of the Dolls was released as a two-disc, special-edition DVD set on June 13, 2006, and is now out of print.

20th Century Fox re-released it on the second disc of the four-disc variety feature pack, Studio Classics: Set 9, which also includes All About Eve, The Inn of the Sixth Happiness, and Valley of the Dolls, on May 4, 2010.

In the UK, Arrow Video released the film on Blu-ray on January 18, 2016, in a special edition with The Seven Minutes.

In the US, The Criterion Collection released the film on DVD and Blu-ray on September 27, 2016, along with Valley of the Dolls.

== Reception ==
=== Initial reviews ===
The film was met with negative reviews upon its initial release. Ebert's future TV co-host Gene Siskel gave the film zero stars out of four, writing in the Chicago Tribune that the film "unfolds with all of the humor and excitement of a padded bra ... Boredom aplenty is provided by a screenplay which for some reason has been turned over to a screenwriting neophyte". He later put it on his list of the 20 worst films of the year.

Vincent Canby of The New York Times wrote that the film "comes off with a slightly higher rating" than the original Valley of the Dolls book and movie, but thought that by "quite consciously attempting to parody his earlier movies" Meyer had "become patronizing".

Variety wrote that it was "not much of a film. Producer-director Russ Meyer, who once made low-budget sex pix which had a crude and innocuous charm but not much of a story, this time around spent between 20 and 30 times the money he used to have, and got less for it".

Charles Champlin of the Los Angeles Times panned the film as "a treat for the emotionally retarded, sexually inadequate and dimwitted. It is a grievously sick melange of hypermammalian girls, obvious double-entendres and sadistic violence".

Gary Arnold of The Washington Post declared it "a mess, a disaster, a stinkeroo, the most wretched of wretched movies. Disregard anything you hear in the so-bad-it's-good or it's-all-a-put-on veins. It's a depressing picture — witless, hysterical, gratuitous, technically inept, needlessly brutal". Mike Wallington of The Monthly Film Bulletin called it "corny, moralising, guileless, and visually about as appealing as a Christmas wrapper. It is also perversely enjoyable if one is prepared to laugh at it as well as with it".

=== Reappraisal ===
Since its release in 1970, the film has acquired a cult following and has even been included in various "best of" lists by film critics. Critical reception has since trended more positive. In 2000, Canadian magazine Take One included it in their "Best Films of the 1970s" critics poll. In 2001, the Village Voice named the film #87 on its list of the 100 Greatest Films of the Century.

On Rotten Tomatoes, the film holds a rating of 76% “Fresh” approval rating from 29 reviews. The critical consensus reads: "Confidently campy and played with groovy conviction, Beyond the Valley of the Dolls is an exuberant expression of both the hilarity and terror that comes with free love". Metacritic, which uses a weighted average, assigned the film a score of 60 out of 100, based on 10 critics, indicating "mixed or average" reviews.

John Waters has expressed admiration for the film, citing it as "one of the best movies ever made".

=== Box office ===
According to Fox records, the film required $4,100,000 in theatrical rentals to break even. By December 11, 1970, it had made $7,000,000, more than enough to be profitable for the studio.

Despite an X rating and a modest budget of $900,000, Beyond the Valley of the Dolls grossed ten times that amount in the U.S. market, qualifying it as a hit for Fox. In 1997, when Roger Ebert & Gene Siskel were guests on Howard Stern, Ebert claimed it made $55 million. In 2004, Ebert claimed it had grossed $40 million.

The production of the film, along with Myra Breckinridge, helped lead to the ousting of Richard Zanuck from Fox.

=== In pop culture ===
Garage rock band Be Your Own Pet's 2008 song "The Kelly Affair" is based on the plot of the film.

Ska Punk Rock band Sublime sampled dialogue from the film in their song “Smoke Two Joints”, for the 40oz. to Freedom album.

Murderdolls, the side project of Slipknot drummer Joey Jordison, named their debut album Beyond the Valley of the Murderdolls in reference to the movie.

== See also ==
- List of American films of 1970
- List of cult films
