= Steve Spray =

American professional golfer (1940–2020)

Personal information
- Full name: John Stephen Spray
- Nationality: United States
- Born: December 16, 1940 Des Moines, Iowa, U.S.
- Died: May 15, 2020 (aged 79) Chesterfield, Missouri, U.S.
- Height: 6 ft 1 in (1.85 m)
- Weight: 170 lb (77 kg; 12 st)
- Children: 2

Career
- Sport: Golf
- College: University of Iowa; Eastern New Mexico University
- Turned professional: 1964
- Former tours: PGA Tour; Champions Tour
- Professional wins: 8

Number of wins by tour
- PGA Tour: 1
- Other: 7

Best results in major championships
- Masters Tournament: 43rd: 1969
- PGA Championship: T78: 1971
- U.S. Open: T5: 1968
- The Open Championship: DNP

John Stephen Spray (December 16, 1940 – May 15, 2020) was an American professional golfer. He played on the PGA Tour in the 1960s and 1970s.

== Early life and amateur career ==
In 1940, Spray was born in Des Moines, Iowa. He grew up in Indianola, Iowa. His first big win as an amateur came in the 1958 Iowa Junior Amateur; the next year he gained national fame by winning the Western Junior.

Spray attended the University of Iowa initially but transferred to Eastern New Mexico University where he spent most of his college career. In consecutive years, from 1962 to 1963, he won the NAIA Championship while at Eastern New Mexico.

== Professional career ==
In 1964, Spray turned professional. He began play on the PGA Tour the following year. The highlight of Spray's career came in 1969 with a win at the San Francisco Open Invitational, the last PGA Tour event held at San Francisco's storied Harding Park Golf Club. His best finish in a major championship was a T-5 at the 1968 U.S. Open.

Spray was hampered by injuries during the last years of his PGA career including tendinitis in his left thumb that forced him to change his grip and back surgery that caused him to miss almost all of 1974.

After leaving the PGA Tour, Spray began working as the head pro at St. Louis Country Club in 1976 – a position he held for more than 30 years.

== Personal life ==
Spray died in Chesterfield, Missouri on May 15, 2020.

== Awards and honors ==
- In 1984, Spray was honored as the Gateway Section PGA Player of the Year.
- In 2009, he was inducted into the Iowa Golf Hall of Fame.

== Amateur wins ==
- 1958 Iowa Junior Amateur
- 1959 Western Junior
- 1962 Northwest Amateur, Central States Amateur, NAIA Championship
- 1963 Iowa Amateur, Central States Amateur, Tournament of Champions, NAIA Championship

== Professional wins (8) ==
=== PGA Tour wins (1) ===
No.	Date	Tournament	Winning score	Margin of victory	Runner-up
1	Oct 26, 1969	San Francisco Open Invitational	−15 (70-63-66-70=269)	1 stroke	(United States) Chi-Chi Rodríguez

=== Other wins (7) ===
- 1964 Iowa Open
- 1966 Waterloo Open Golf Classic
- 1972 Herman Sani
- 1973 New Mexico Open, Arizona Open
- 1977 Gateway Section PGA Championship
- 1979 Gateway Section PGA Championship

== Results in major championships ==
Tournament	1964	1965	1966	1967	1968	1969	1970	1971	1972	1973	1974	1975	1976
Masters Tournament	CUT					42							
U.S. Open				CUT	T5	CUT	T51		CUT				
PGA Championship								T79					

Tournament	1977	1978	1979	1980	1981	1982	1983	1984	1985	1986	1987	1988	1989
Masters Tournament													
U.S. Open	CUT		CUT			CUT							
PGA Championship				CUT									CUT

Note: Spray never played in the Open Championship.

Top 10
Did not play

CUT = missed the half-way cut
"T" = tied for place
