= 3 Stories About Evil =

- Film poster
- Directed by: Michael Frost
- Written by: Walter Reuben
- Produced by: Jay Frank; Walter Reuben; Michael Frost; Andrew Sachs; Edgar Varela
- Starring: Mink Stole; Erica Gavin; Joe Dallesandro; Billy Drago; Suzete Belouin; Barry Brisco; Joey Krebs; Daylyn Presley; Kimmy Robertson; Laurence Tolhurst
- Cinematography: Andrew K. Sachs
- Edited by: Michael Frost
- Distributed by: Helsinki Productions
- Release date: March 21, 2008 (Boston Underground)
- Running time: 22 minutes
- Country: United States
- Language: English

3 Stories About Evil is a 2008 short, experimental narrative film directed by Michael Frost and photographed by Andrew K. Sachs. It was written by Walter Reuben and stars Mink Stole, Erica Gavin, Joe Dallesandro, and Billy Drago. It premiered at Boston Underground Film Festival on 21 March 2008. The film is a narrative short composed almost entirely of still photographs. The three stories are interrelated black comedies about family, sexuality, the media, and beauty pageants.

== Plot ==
Three interrelated stories comprise the plot structure of this film. In the first, "The Story of Johnnie & Laurie," Johnnie (Barry Brisco) is betrayed by his sister (Suzette Belouin) when she finds out his sexual proclivities. When she informs her parents (Billy Drago & Erica Gavin) about his homosexuality, their estrangement leads Johnnie through a series of unsavory incidents. In "The Story of Pat & Pepper," Pat (Mink Stole) is a Christian conservative and her five-year-old daughter Pepper (Pepper Peeters) participates in children's beauty pageants. Ambivalent over her daughter's attractiveness to a pageant judge (Daylyn Presley), Pat accidentally kills Pepper and transforms her into a dead chanteuse. Finally, in "The Story of Jim," Jim (Joey Krebs) takes the advice of his best friend Eddie (Laurence Tolhurst) and gets a job in the television industry. When Jim's career plummets due to poor ratings, he finds a sex change operation the perfect solution out of a desperate situation.

== Cast ==
- Stacie Abram as Woman Caller
- Christy Ball as Toyota Kawasaki
- Suzete Belouin as Laurie Harris
- Squeaky Blonde as Judge
- Barry Brisco as Johnnie Harris
- Tim Caszatt as Judge
- Michael Ciriaco as Robby Donan
- Joe Dallesandro as Jean Maries
- Billy Drago as Mr. Harris
- Erica Gavin as Mrs. Harris
- Heather Gray as Anne
- Joey Krebs as Jim
- George Kuchar as Telephone Man
- Daylyn Wolfram Presley as Athletic Coach; Television Network Executive; Pervert
- Kimmy Robertson as Narrator
- Walter Reuben as Narrator
- Sebastian Sage as Hippy
- Mink Stole as Pat Peeters
- Peter Struve as Mercury Man
- Grant Sullivan as Kroger
- Laurence Tolhurst as Eddie
- Kat Turner as Dominatrix
- Dave White as Narrator

== Awards ==
- Boston Underground Film Festival 2008 - Most Effectively Offensive
- DragonCon Independent Film Festival (Atlanta, GA) 2008 - Best Dark Comedy
- RADAR International Film Festival (Hamburg, Germany) 2008 - Best Art & Animation
- Downtown Film Festival Los Angeles 2008 - Best Experimental Short Film
