= Dolly Martin =

English model and actress

Playboy centerfold appearance
- May 1966
- Preceded by: Karla Conway
- Succeeded by: Kelly Burke

Personal details
- Born: Dolly Read; 13 September 1944 (age 81) Bristol, England

Dolly Martin (née Read; 13 September 1944) is an English pinup model and actress. She is best remembered for her appearance in Playboy magazine and as the lead character in Beyond the Valley of the Dolls. She sometimes is credited as Margaret Read, Dolly Read Martin or Dolly Martin.

== Biography ==
=== Career ===
Read's first onscreen appearance was in the 1963 film Kiss of the Vampire, followed by a role in the British TV series Dixon of Dock Green later that year. She was Playboy magazine's Playmate of the Month in May 1966. She posed for the magazine again in 1970. She also worked as a Playboy Bunny at the Playboy Clubs in Chicago, London and New York City.

After appearing in the low-budget erotic film That Tender Touch in 1969, she landed the lead role of the sexy but naive rock-and-roll singer Kelly MacNamara in Russ Meyer's comedy Beyond the Valley of the Dolls the following year.

Throughout the 1970s, Read appeared on television with guest-starring roles in shows such as Charlie's Angels, Fantasy Island and Vega$. She was a frequent panelist on the game show Match Game.

In 2006, Read, along with other cast members, provided commentary and was interviewed for the release of a special edition DVD of Beyond the Valley of the Dolls.

=== Personal life ===
Read was born in Bristol, England. She married American comedian Dick Martin in 1971. They divorced in 1974 and were remarried in 1978. Read was a stepmother to his two sons, Richard Martin and actor Cary Martin. Dick Martin died on 24 May 2008.

== Filmography ==
=== Films ===
- Kiss of the Vampire (uncredited, 1963)
- That Tender Touch (1969)
- Beyond the Valley of the Dolls (1970)

=== Television ===
- Dixon of Dock Green (1 episode, 1963)
- Tattletales (1977)
- Charlie's Angels (1 episode, 1978)
- Vega$ (1 episode, 1978)
- Match Game (1975–1981)
- Fantasy Island (2 episodes, 1980)
- Match Game (1990–1991)

== See also ==
- List of people in Playboy 1960–1969

Judy Tyler	Melinda Windsor	Priscilla Wright	Karla Conway	Dolly Read	Kelly Burke
Tish Howard	Susan Denberg	Dianne Chandler	Linda Moon	Lisa Baker	Susan Bernard
