= Attack of the 60 Foot Centerfold =

- Theatrical release poster
- Directed by: Fred Olen Ray
- Written by: Steve Armogida
- Produced by: Fred Olen Ray
- Starring: J.J. North; Raelyn Saalman; Tim Abell; Tammy Parks; Michelle Bauer; George Stover; Nikki Fritz; Ross Hagen; Jay Richardson; Russ Tamblyn; Tommy Kirk; Stanley Livingston; John LaZar
- Cinematography: Gary Graver
- Edited by: W. Peter Miller
- Music by: Jeffrey Walton
- Distributed by: New Line Cinema
- Release date: June 2, 1995
- Running time: 84 minutes
- Country: United States
- Language: English

Attack of the 60 Foot Centerfold (also known as Attack of the 60 Foot Centerfolds) is a 1995 comedy satirical science fiction film directed by Fred Olen Ray and starring J.J. North, Ted Monte, Tammy Parks, Raelyn Saalman, Nikki Fritz, John LaZar, Tim Abell and Jay Richardson, with cameos by Russ Tamblyn and Michelle Bauer and a "running man" credit for science fiction author Brad Linaweaver. The film is a parody of Attack of the 50 Foot Woman, but contains much nudity. The film was loosely remade as Attack of the 50 Foot Cheerleader (2012).

== Plot ==
The three finalists for Plaything Magazine's "Centerfold of the Year" - Inga, Betty and Angel Grace - are at a photoshoot. Betty makes disparaging remarks about Angel's appearance. After the shoot, Angel goes to Dr. Lindstrom's clinic. She took experimental beauty enhancing drugs previously, and now wants to start taking them again. Dr. Lindstrom warns her that any additional doses could be fatal, but ultimately gives her a case with many vials, cautioning her to only take one a day.

Shortly thereafter, Angel, Betty, and Inga go to the Plaything Mansion for a photoshoot to decide who will be the Centerfold of the year. There, they meet Bob Gordon, the founder of Plaything Magazine. The morning of the photoshoot, Angel oversleeps. She realizes that she didn't take a vial the previous day, and wrinkles are starting to form. In an act of desperation, she takes several vials. The overdose then causes her to pass out momentarily. When she reawakens, she has grown 1–2 feet taller. Angel is oblivious, even though her high heels and bikini seem smaller.

When Angel arrives late to the photoshoot, everyone else notices her sudden height increase. She and the other women begin posing for Mark. Suddenly, Angel faints. Mark, Betty and Inga go to alert Gordon while Mark's assistant, Wilson, stays behind. By the time the group returns with Gordon, Angel has grown into a giantess.

Sometime afterward, a circus tent is set up for Angel, who is upset at her sudden growth spurt. Back at the Plaything Mansion, Mark and Gordon plot to make Angel the centerfold, use her size as a major selling point for the magazine, and then turn her over to the government for experimentation. Wilson overhears the conversation, and confronts Mark about the plan; Mark shrugs off Wilson's concerns.

Over the next couple of days, Mark tries to persuade Angel to pose for a photoshoot. He lies to her, saying that Gordon has arranged for a specialist to come in and help her, and that Dr. Lindstrom cannot be reached. One night, Wilson sneaks into Angel's tent. He explains that she is being lied to, but she doesn't believe him. He also confesses his love for her.

The next day, Wilson calls Dr. Lindstrom, who agrees to go to the Mansion to see Angel. After the call, Wilson and Betty find a rough-copy of the next issue of Plaything, promising Plaything's 'Biggest Centerfold Yet.' Betty, furious that Angel's size has seemingly won her the centerfold contest, sneaks into Angel's room. There, she finds Angel's beauty enhancement drugs, and takes several vials.

Some distance away from the Mansion, Mark has convinced Angel to do the photoshoot, and is taking pictures of her. Gordon and Wilson join them towards the end of the shoot. Gordon continues to pretend he contacted a specialist, but Angel confronts him about lying. Betty arrives, having grown giant, and attacks Angel. Their brawl eventually leads them to downtown Los Angeles. Lindstrom, Mark, and Wilson pursue them. Wilson uses an antidote, created by Lindstrom, which shrinks Angel and Betty back to normal. Wilson and Angel embrace. Mark forcibly tries to kiss Betty, who explodes due to an instability with the antidote, killing them both.

== Cast ==
- J. J. North as Angel Grace
- Ted Monte as Wilson
- Raelyn Saalman as Inga Sorenson
- Tammy Parks as Betty Bennett
- Tim Abell as Mark
- John Henry Richardson as Bob Gordon (credited as Jay Richardson)
- John LaZar as Dr. Paul Lindstrom
- George Stover as Dr. Eric Kramer
- Michelle Bauer as Dr. Joyce Mann
- Nikki Fritz as Rosita
- Ross Hagen as Truck Driver
- Tommy Kirk as Passenger
- Peter Spellos as Vic Stryker (credited as G. Gordon Baer)
- Stanley Livingston as Glenn Manning
- Deborah Dutch as Nurse Williams (credited as Debra Dare)
- Tony Franco as Ray, The Editor
- Forrest J. Ackerman as Dracula
- Tony Clay as Invisible Man
- Jim Wynorski as Guy Who Can't Believe His Eyes
- Tony Lorea as Bogie
- Jennifer New as The Receptionist

== Production ==
Tommy Kirk has a small role in the film.
