= Caged Heat =

1974 film by Jonathan Demme

- Theatrical release poster
- Directed by: Jonathan Demme
- Written by: Jonathan Demme
- Produced by: Evelyn Purcell
- Starring: Juanita Brown; Roberta Collins; Erica Gavin; Ella Reid; Rainbeaux Smith; Barbara Steele
- Cinematography: Tak Fujimoto
- Edited by: Johanna Demetrakas; Carolyn Hicks; Michal Goldman
- Music by: John Cale
- Production companies: Renegade Women Co. Artists Entertainment Complex
- Distributed by: New World Pictures
- Release date: 30 October 1974 (Los Angeles)
- Running time: 83 minutes
- Country: United States
- Language: English
- Budget: $180,000

Caged Heat (also known as Renegade Girls) is a 1974 American women-in-prison film written and directed by Jonathan Demme, in his directorial debut. It stars Juanita Brown, Roberta Collins, Erica Gavin, Ella Reid, Rainbeaux Smith, and Barbara Steele. John Cale wrote and performed its soundtrack music, which features the guitar playing of Mike Bloomfield.

The film was produced independently and distributed by New World Pictures, headed by Roger Corman. It premiered on October 30, 1974. Retrospective reviews of Caged Heat have been generally positive, noting Demme's strong direction and the film's social commentary and feminist themes.

== Plot ==
In Los Angeles, undercover police officers arrive at a motel where those inside, including Jacqueline Wilson, are trafficking illegal drugs. During the escape, an officer and one of Jacqueline's accomplices are shot, while two of them escape. Jacqueline is arrested and sentenced to 40 years inside a women's correctional prison for possession of illegal drugs and attempted murder.

Upon her arrival, Jacqueline is strip searched and dines with her fellow inmates inside the cafeteria. The next morning, the inmates are transferred to Connorville Correctional Institute for Women, under the control of Superintendent McQueen. There, they are treated to a drag show but McQueen leaves in disgust. The next morning, McQueen reprimands Belle and Pandora, two of the inmates who organized the drag show. McQueen punishes Pandora with solitary confinement after discovering a photograph of her boyfriend inside her cell.

While showering, Jacqueline gets into an altercation with Maggie, after which McQueen threatens her with behavioral therapy. Back in her cell, Belle tells her criminal history to Jacqueline. The next morning, Belle crawls through an air vent and steals food from the staff lounge. She gives the food to Pandora, who is still under confinement. Meanwhile, inside the kitchen, Maggie assaults one of the officers and steals her handgun. She then sets a fire and attempts to free herself, but she is prevented. Although Jacqueline tried to save the officer, McQueen sends her to the behavioral clinic, where she is given shock therapy.

The next morning, Belle attempts to steal food again, but is caught by a kitchen matron. Belle shoves her against the refrigerator, and the matron is killed. Belle is then apprehended and taken to the clinic. Outside, the inmates are picking apples when Maggie fakes a medical accident. She assaults an officer and steals a prison transport truck, with Jacqueline hitching a ride. They take the truck to an auto repair shop, where the mechanic helps the women escape after an officer spots the truck.

Along the road, Maggie and Jacqueline steal a couple's car and arrive at a brothel. There, Maggie reunites with her friend Crazy Alice. Jacqueline calls her friend Sparky, asking him to create fake IDs. One of Alice's sex clients turns out to be an undercover officer, who attempts to arrest her along with Maggie under suspicions of soliciting a prostitute. The pair incapacitate the officer and escape.

Back at the prison, Lavelle, one of the inmates who attempted to escape, is relieved from further therapy based on good behavior, and is given a job at the clinic. There, Doctor Randolph makes Belle, who is under sedation, sign a medical form allowing him to perform psychological surgery if she wants parole. Randolph then sexually assaults Belle, which is witnessed by Lavelle. On the lam, Jacqueline and Maggie attempt a bank robbery, but a gang of male robbers have beaten them to it. Officers arrive outside the bank, and the women escape. Jacqueline decides to return to the prison to free the other inmates. Maggie initially resists, but changes her mind. They hijack a transport truck and are driven inside the compound.

Meanwhile, Lavelle alerts Pandora about Randolph's unethical behavior. Pandora injures herself and is taken to the clinic, where she holds Randolph at knifepoint. Jacqueline arrives, and holds Randolph and McQueen at gunpoint. Jacqueline and Pandora subdue them, where they, along with Belle and Lavelle, attempt to escape. Pinter, McQueen's assistant warden, sounds an alarm which alerts the prison officers outside. The women and the officers engage in a shootout, in which McQueen and Randolph are shot. The women escape into Maggie's car and drive off.

== Cast ==
- Erica Gavin as Jacqueline Wilson
- Juanita Brown as Maggie Cromwell
- Roberta Collins as Belle Tyson
- Ella Reid as Pandora Williams
- Rainbeaux Smith as Lavelle
- Warren Miller as Dr. Randolph
- Barbara Steele as Superintendent McQueen
- Lynda Gold as "Crazy" Alice
- Mickey Fox as Bernice
- Toby Carr Rafelson as Pinter
- Ann Stockdale as Bonnie
- Irene Stokes as Hazel

== Production ==
Jonathan Demme had produced two films for Roger Corman, including the women in prison picture The Hot Box (1972). He wanted to become a director, and wrote a script titled Renegade Girls (with input from Frances Doel) for Corman. However, the producer did not want to fund it, as he thought the cycle had peaked. Demme succeeded in raising the finance on his own, with help from Artists Entertainment Complex, a production company formed by Martin Bregman and Samuel Gelfman. Corman then agreed to distribute it through New World Pictures. Filming and post-production lasted four months from January to April 1974.

Before its release, the film was retitled Caged Heat, a likely reference to two earlier prison-themed movies, Caged and White Heat, both of which Jonathan Demme discussed paying homage in his DVD commentary for the film.

For his film, Demme introduced new aspects to Caged Heat, including a satirical approach and making the sadistic warden female instead of male.

== Reception ==
=== Critical response ===
Kevin Thomas of the Los Angeles Times wrote: "With wit, style and unflagging verve, writer-director Jonathan Demme sends up the genre while still giving the mindless action fan his money's worth."

A review from TV Guide gave the film three out of four stars, stating "Director Demme's auspicious debut transcends the sleazy dictates of its genre and stands along with Stephanie Rothman's Terminal Island as a genuine feminist political statement in a milieu lifted straight out of the most misogynistic fantasies of men ... Steele, a cult favorite for a number of Italian horror films by Mario Bava, does a wonderful turn as the crippled, demented warden."

Raquel Stecher of Turner Classic Movies wrote: "Demme's film offers subtle social commentary on gender inequality and the inability of the prison system to properly rehabilitate its inmates. At the time, the women-in-prison sub-genre was going out of fashion, but Demme elevates his B picture with his ingenuity and attention to detail."

== Related works ==
Two later films, Caged Heat II: Stripped of Freedom (1994) and Caged Heat 3000 (1995), made use of the Caged Heat name and the women-in-prison situation, but are unrelated to the original film.

== See also ==
- List of American films of 1974
- List of cult films
