= John LaZar =

American actor

- Born: May 22, 1946 (age 80); United States
- Occupation: Actor

John LaZar (born May 22, 1946) is an American actor of both stage and screen, best remembered for his lead role as Ronnie 'Z-man' Barzell in the Russ Meyer film Beyond the Valley of the Dolls (1970), co-written by Meyer and Roger Ebert.

LaZar grew up in San Francisco, California and is of Mediterranean and Native American heritage. He trained at the American Conservatory Theater and has studied acting with Uta Hagen. A veteran of many Shakespearean stage productions, Lazar is also a martial arts expert and fencer.

LaZar later appeared in Russ Meyer's Supervixens (1975) and Roger Corman's Deathstalker II (1987).

== Selected credits ==
- Beyond the Valley of the Dolls (1970) (director Russ Meyer)
- Supervixens (1975) (director Russ Meyer)
- Every Girl Should Have One (1978)
- Greatest Heroes of the Bible (TV series) (1978)
- Up 'n' Coming (1983) (X-rated film starring Marilyn Chambers) (Non-sexual role)
- Scorpion (1986)
- Deathstalker II (1987) (producer Roger Corman)
- Eddie Presley (1992) (director Jeff Burr)
- Attack of the 60 Foot Centerfold (1995) (director Fred Olen Ray)
- Stripteaser (1995)
- Night of the Scarecrow (1995) (director Jeff Burr)
- Over the Wire (1996)
- Click (TV series) (1997)
- Maximum Revenge (1997)
- Vic (2006) short film (director Sage Stallone)
- Alice Jacobs is Dead (2009) short film
