= Bikini Hotel =

1997 film by Jeff Frey

- Directed by: Jeff Frey
- Written by: David Huey; Dom Magwili; Christopher Wolf
- Starring: J. J. North; Tina-Desiree Berg; Stella Stevens
- Cinematography: Ed Tillman
- Edited by: Greg Cannone
- Music by: Paul Nelson
- Production companies: Cine Excel Entertainment; Screenland Partners III
- Distributed by: Cine Excel Entertainment
- Release date: 1997
- Running time: 95 minutes
- Country: United States
- Language: English

Bikini Hotel is a 1997 camp comedy film that aired on Cinemax. It was written by Dom Magwili and directed by Jeff Frey. The film features a visual gag based on the 50 ft woman and a cat fight in the miniature golf sequence.

== Plot ==
Samantha Vance, played by J. J. North, inherits the run-down Tiki Hotel when her father dies. She decides to fix it up but has problems drumming up business. Her friends throw a party at the hotel and it becomes clear that she can make money if she turns it into the "Bikini Hotel" with all of the staff members wearing bikinis. This elicits jealousy in Jacqueline Renee, played by Tina-Desiree Berg, and her boss, Gail Regent, played by Stella Stevens, who run the adjacent Regent Hotel. They want to turn Samantha's hotel into a parking lot. It all culminates in a miniature golf competition in which the winner keeps the Bikini Hotel. Julie Strain makes an appearance as Jacqeline Renee's spy Raquel.

== Reception ==
The film became a cult classic, spawning a host of bikini business movies. Femme Fatales magazine published a production diary that featured actress Tina-Desiree Berg as the centerfold (Pam Anderson issue, Volume 4, number 8).
