= Stanley Livingston =

American actor (born 1950)

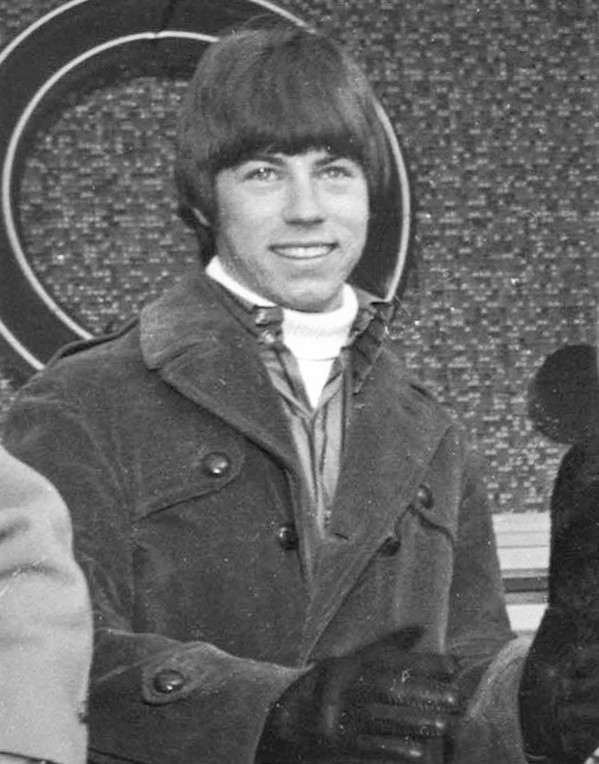
- Livingston at Lindale Mall in 1969
- Born: Stanley Bernard Livingston; November 24, 1950 (age 75); Los Angeles, California, U.S.
- Occupations: Actor; Producer; Director; Editor
- Years active: 1956-2025
- Known for: My Three Sons
- Spouse(s): Sandra L. Goble (m. 1968; div. 1974) Paula Drake (m. 2015)
- Children: 1
- Website: stanleylivingston.com

Stanley Bernard Livingston (born November 24, 1950) is an American actor.

== Biography ==
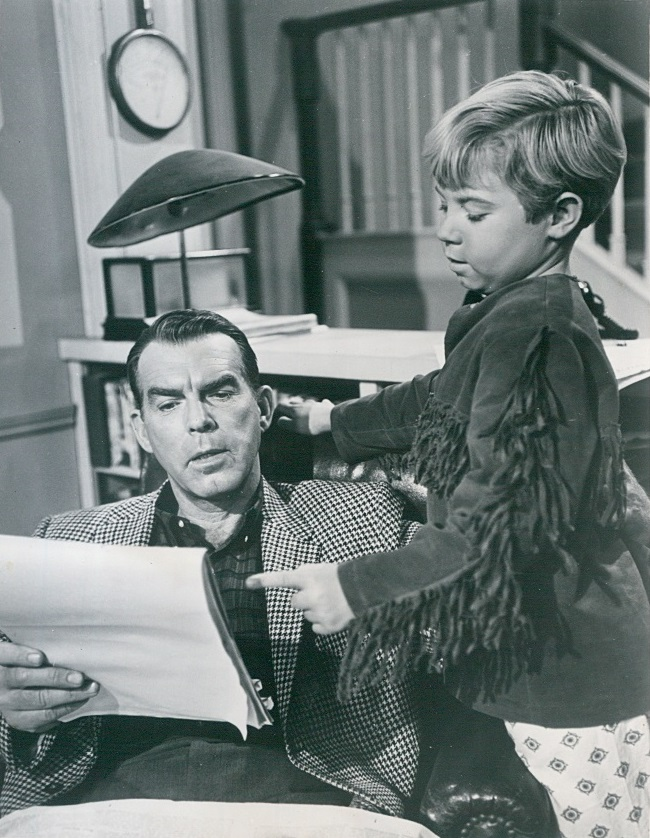
MacMurray and Livingston in My Three Sons, Season 1, Episode 19 (Organization Woman) 1961

He is best known for playing Richard "Chip" Douglas, the third son of Steve Douglas (Fred MacMurray) on the television series My Three Sons. He and MacMurray were the only actors in the cast who appeared throughout the entire series. Stanley's younger brother Barry played his adopted brother "Ernie" in later seasons. With the death of Tim Considine in 2022, Livingston became the last surviving original cast member.

Livingston was born in Los Angeles, California. Later in his career, he was a producer and director in Los Angeles.

== Select filmography ==
=== Actor ===
- The Bonnie Parker Story (1958).... Little Boy
- Rally 'Round the Flag, Boys! (1958).... Peter Bannerman
- The Adventures of Ozzie & Harriet (1958–1963) .... Stanley/Small Boy
- Skippy (TV pilot, 1958) ... Skippy
- Please Don't Eat the Daisies (1960) .... Gabriel MacKay
- My Three Sons .... Richard 'Chip' Douglas (1960–1972)
- X-15 (1961) .... Mike Brandon
- How the West Was Won (1962) ... Prescott Rawlings
- Sarge "The Badge or the Cross" (1971) (TV) .... Charlie
- The Roman Holidays .... Happius Holiday (1972)
- Private Parts (1972) .... Jeff
- Room 222 (1 episode, 1973)
- Devlin (1974) TV Series .... Additional Voices
- Scooby-Doo (1974) TV Series .... Additional Voices
- Lucas Tanner (1974) (TV) .... David Elrod
- Attack of the 60 Foot Centerfold (1995) .... Glenn Manning
- Stripteaser (1995) .... Sneezer

=== As himself ===
- This Is Your Life .... Himself (1 episode, 1961)
- Yearbook: Class of 1967 (1985) (TV) .... Himself
- TVLand Awards: A Celebration of Classic TV (2003) (TV) .... Himself
- The O'Reilly Factor .... Himself (1 episode, February 2005)
- TV Land Confidential .... Himself (4 episodes, 2005)
- Living in TV Land .... Himself (1 episode, 2006)
- On The Edge of Black and White .... Himself (Documentary, 2008)
- The Early Show .... Himself (TV Series, 2009)
- The Last Days of Cinerama .... Himself (Documentary, 2012)
- Stu’s Show .... Himself (Documentary, 2022)

=== Director ===
- Cory the Clown (2001 TV series; 20 episodes)
- The Actor's Journey for Kids (Five-Part Documentary Series. TRT: 300 minutes, 2007)
- The Actor's Journey (Eight-Part Documentary Series. TRT: 600 minutes, 2008)

=== Producer ===
- Checkers (2005 feature film)
- The Actor's Journey Eight-Part Documentary Series. TRT: 600 minutes (2007)
- The Actor's Journey for Kids (Five-Part Documentary Series TRT: 300 minutes, 2008)
- In The Picture (2012 Cinerama film)

=== Editor ===
- Checkers (TRT: 83 minutes, 2005 feature film)

=== Special effects ===
- Attack of the 60 Foot Centerfold (1995)

=== Writer ===
- The Aftermath (1982; story)

=== Singer ===
- "Hairspray" b/w "Pen Pal" (Marilyn Records 03). Released in the fall of 1962 when Livingston was just eleven years old, "Hairspray" became a regional hit record in the radio publication The Gavin Report and was played at a handful of radio stations, such as KJOY in Stockton, California (where it climbed all the way to #2 in December) and at WMEX in Boston (where it made the top twenty). It was the only record Livingston ever released.
