= Kimmy Robertson =

American actress (born 1954)

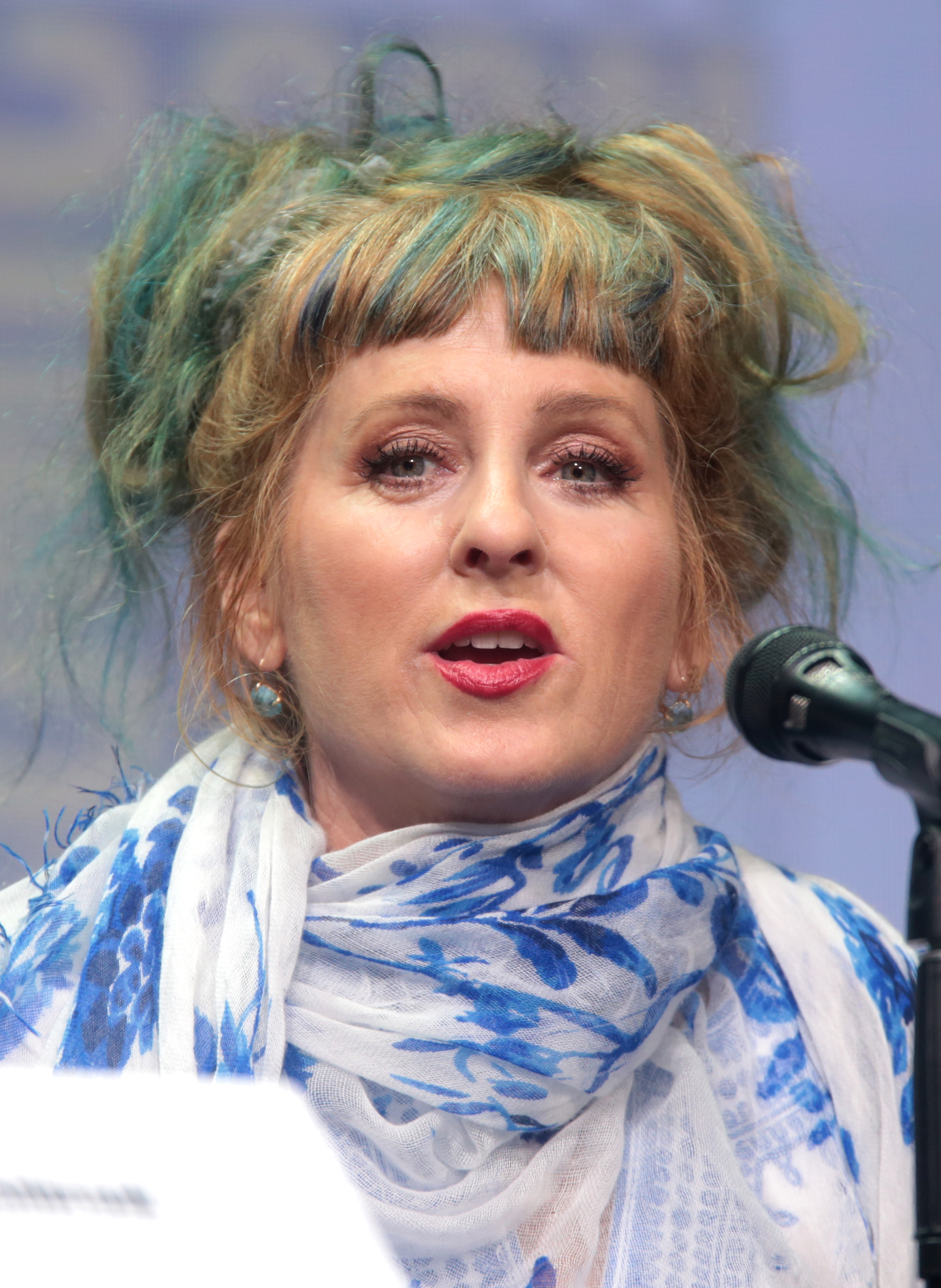
- Robertson at the 2017 San Diego Comic-Con
- Born: Kimberly Ann Robertson; November 27, 1954 (age 71); Los Angeles, California, U.S.
- Occupation: Actress
- Years active: 1982–present

Kimberly Ann Robertson (born November 27, 1954) is an American actress. Best known for her portrayal of Lucy Moran on the television series Twin Peaks (1990–1991; 2017), she also voiced Samantha Stanky in the Simpsons episode "Bart's Friend Falls in Love" and had supporting roles in the films The Last American Virgin (1982), Honey, I Shrunk the Kids (1989), and Don't Tell Mom the Babysitter's Dead (1991).

== Career ==
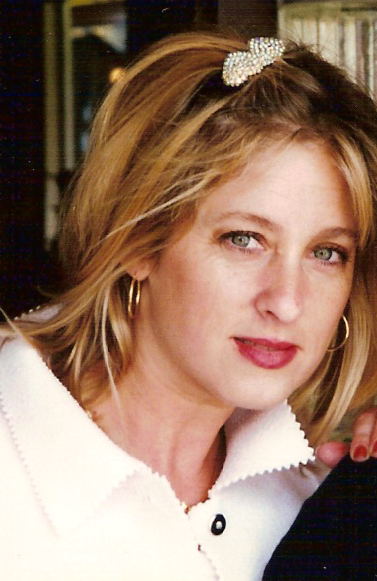
Robertson at the Twin Peaks fan festival, 1996

Robertson's high-pitched voice has led to roles in animated series such as Batman: The Animated Series, The Critic, The Tick and The Simpsons. Her voice also featured in Beauty and the Beast in 1991. From 1993 to 1995, Robertson voiced Penny on 2 Stupid Dogs' Secret Squirrel segments. Robertson performed a short spoken-word segment on Roger McGuinn's 1990 album Back from Rio. In 2011, she started playing Penny Wise on the long-running radio series Adventures in Odyssey. From 2019 to 2026, she voiced the main role of Ollie in the animated series Ollie & Scoops.

=== Support of Brian Peck ===
On April 3, 2024, former child star Drake Bell, best known for his work on The Amanda Show and Drake & Josh, criticized Robertson for writing a letter of support for Brian Peck, a Nickelodeon voice coach who was later convicted of sexually assaulting Bell when he was a teenager in 2001. The backlash resulted in Robertson deleting her Instagram. Robertson wrote the letter in 2004, after Peck had been charged with 11 counts of lewd sexual conduct, including sodomy and oral copulation by anesthesia or controlled substance, with a minor. In the letter, she called Bell an "overtly gay, oversexed person" and said she believed Bell, then 14 or 15, had pressured Peck, then 40 or 41, into a sexual relationship. The letter came to light shortly before the release of Quiet on Set: The Dark Side of Kids TV.

== Filmography ==
=== Film ===
Year	Title	Role	Notes
1982	The Last American Virgin	Rose	
1984	Bad Manners	Sarah Fitzpatrick	
1988	The Couch Trip		
1989	Trust Me	Party Gal	
1989	My Mom's a Werewolf	Pedestrian	
1989	Honey, I Shrunk the Kids	Gloria Forrester	
1989	The Little Mermaid	Ariel's sisters	Voice, uncredited
1990	The Willies	Ride Operator	
1991	Don't Tell Mom the Babysitter's Dead	Cathy Henderson	
1991	Beauty and the Beast	Featherduster	Voice
1992	Twin Peaks: Fire Walk with Me	Lucy Moran	Scenes deleted
1994	Leprechaun 2	Tourist's Girlfriend	
1997	Speed 2: Cruise Control	Liza	
1998	Belle's Magical World	Fifi	Voice
1999	Stuart Little	Race Spectator	
2000	One Life Stand	Call Centre Operator	
2008	3 Stories About Evil	Narrator #1	Short film
2010	Anderson's Cross	Teacher #1	
2014	Twin Peaks: The Missing Pieces	Lucy Moran	Deleted Scenes from Twin Peaks: Fire Walk With Me (filmed in 1992)
2020	The 420 Movie: Mary & Jane	Boogie's Mom	
2021	Michael & Maria vs. the Multiverse: A Tragedy	Dispatcher	

=== Television ===
Year	Title	Role	Notes
1984	Family Secrets	Mickey	Television film
1987	Second Chance		Episode: "Moving In"
1988, 1992	Perfect Strangers	Clerk, Honey LeBelwich	2 episodes
1988	Webster	Kiki	Episode: "The Election"
1989	Married... with Children	Molly	Episode: "He Ain't Much, But He's Mine"
1990	Bill & Ted's Excellent Adventures	Missy Preston	Voice
1990	Gravedale High	Duzer	Voice, 13 episodes
1990–1991	Twin Peaks	Lucy Moran	29 episodes
1991	ABC Weekend Special	Emma Spritz	Episode: "Ralph S. Mouse"
1991	Tales from the Crypt	Lisa	Episode: "Top Billing"
1992	The Simpsons	Samantha Stanky	Voice, episode: "Bart's Friend Falls in Love"
1992	Fish Police	Donna	Voice, episode: "No Way to Treat a Fillet-dy"
1992	Batman: The Animated Series	Alice Pleasance	Voice, episode: "Mad as a Hatter"
1992	The Little Mermaid	Alana	Voice, 2 episodes
1993	2 Stupid Dogs	Penny	Voice, 3 episodes
1994	The Critic		Voice, 2 episodes
1994–1996	The Tick	Dot	Voice, 12 episodes
1995	ER	Arlena	Episode: "Full Moon, Saturday Night"
1996	The Louie Show	Kimmy	6 episodes
1996	Ellen	Brandy	2 episodes
1997–2000	Pepper Ann	Gwen Mezzrow	Voice, 7 episodes
1998	Beyond Belief: Fact or Fiction	Secretary	Episode: "The Wrestler, The Escape, Dead Friday, Ghost Visitor & The Lady in a Black Dress"
1999	Batman Beyond	Margo	Voice, episode: "Disappearing Inque"
1999	Chicken Soup for the Soul	Melissa	Episode: "A-Head of the Game"
2001	House of Mouse	Feather Duster	Voice, episode: "Goofy's Valentine Date"
2002	The Amanda Show	Social Worker	Episode: "Episode 36"
2003	Becker	Doris	Episode: "Afterglow"
2004	Drake & Josh	Mrs. Galloway	Episode: "Two Idiots and a Baby"
2012	And You Know Who You Are		Episode: "And You Know Who You Are"
2013	Legit	Dog Lady	Episode: "Anger"
2013	Southland	Bondage Woman	Episode: "Bleed Out"
2014	Psych	Franny	Episode: "S.E.I.Z.E. the Day"
2014	Marry Me	Hostess	Episode: "Pilot"
2016	Angel from Hell	Tessa	Episode: "The Flask"
2017	Twin Peaks: The Return	Lucy Brennan	10 episodes
2018	Over the Hill	Linda	Television film
2019–2023	Ollie & Scoops	Ollie	Voice, main role

=== Music videos ===
Year	Title	Artist	Role	Ref.
2016	"Unbury the Hatchet"	Dumb Numbers		

=== Theatre ===
Year	Play	Role	Venue	Ref.
1991	The Long and the Short of Gerald Tooie		Theatre/Theater, 1713 N. Cahuenga Boulevard	
1992	Ladies Room	Gigi	Theatre on the Square, California	
2019	Suicidal Blonde	Katie	The Whitefire Theatre, Sherman Oaks, Los Angeles	
