= The Roman Holidays =

American animated TV series

- Genre: Animated sitcom
- Voices of: Dom DeLuise; Daws Butler; Pamelyn Ferdin; Stanley Livingston; Shirley Mitchell; Hal Smith; Dave Willock
- Composer: Hoyt Curtin
- Country of origin: United States
- Original language: English
- No. of seasons: 1
- No. of episodes: 13

Production
- Executive producers: William Hanna; Joseph Barbera
- Production company: Hanna-Barbera Productions

Original release
- Network: NBC
- Release: September 9 – December 2, 1972

The Roman Holidays is a half-hour Saturday morning animated series produced by Hanna-Barbera Productions and broadcast on NBC from September 9 to December 2, 1972. Reruns were later shown on the USA Cartoon Express during the 1980s, Cartoon Network during the 1990s and Boomerang during the 2000s.

The show was an attempt by Hanna-Barbera to replicate the success of their 1960-1966 show The Flintstones, with another modern family living in heavily fictionalized Roman times. Thirteen episodes were produced. An Ancient Roman setting was one of the ideas that Hanna-Barbera considered when creating The Flintstones.

Very similar in theme to both The Flintstones and The Jetsons, The Roman Holidays brought a look at the "marble age" life in Ancient Rome, as seen through the eyes of Augustus "Gus" Holiday and his family. The opening shows a chariot traffic jam and a TV, showing football on Channel "IV".

== Plot ==
The Holidays, a Roman family living at the Venus DeMilo Arms Apartments in A.D. 63, deal with a variety of modern-day problems. Gus Holiday works at the Forum Construction Company for his demanding boss, Mr. Tycoonius, who is constantly threatening to fire Gus if an assignment he is given goes awry. He lives with his wife, Laurie, the children Precocia and Happius (Happy), and pet lion, Brutus. Their neighbors are good friends: Herman, Henrietta and their daughter, Groovia, Happy's girlfriend. Their lives are embittered by their exasperated landlord, Mr. Evictus, who: tries to find proof of Brutus living with the Holidays, has a daughter, named Snobbia, and excites Gus's tagline "Evictus will evict us !".

== Cast ==
- Dave Willock as Gus Holiday, the father of the Holiday family, who is an architect at Forum Construction Company.
- Shirley Mitchell as Laurie Holiday, the mother.
- Dom DeLuise as Mr. Evictus, the landlord.
- Daws Butler as Brutus the Lion, the family pet.
- Pamelyn Ferdin as Precocia Holiday, the young daughter.
- Stanley Livingston as Happius "Hap" Holiday, the teenaged son.
- Harold Peary as Herman, the father of the neighboring family.
- Janet Waldo as Henrietta, the mother of the neighboring family.
- Judy Strangis as Groovia, the daughter of the neighboring family and Hap's girlfriend.
- Hal Smith as Mr. Tycoonius, Gus Holiday's boss.
- John Stephenson as additional voices.

== Episodes ==
No.	Title	Original release date	Prod. code
1	"Double Date"	September 9, 1972	58-1
Mr. Evictus threatens to evict the Holiday family if they fail to fix up his daughter Snobbia with a date for the big high school dance.
2	"The Lion's Share"	September 16, 1972	58-2
After Mr. Evictus threatens to evict the family for violating the "no pets" policy, Brutus runs away to find his long-lost father.
3	"Star For A Day"	September 23, 1972	58-3
Hap turns out to be a look-alike for rock star Davey Cassius, so the two trade places for the day.
4	"Hero-Sandwiched"	September 30, 1972	58-4
Gus struggles with his conscience when he's mistakenly honored as the hero who foiled a robbery.
5	"The Big Split-Up"	October 7, 1972	58-5
When Groovia overhears Precocia setting up Brutus on a date, she thinks it's for Hap and breaks up with him.
6	"Hectic Holiday"	October 14, 1972	58-6
The family finds an offer to trade houses with another family in Venice for a free vacation.
7	"Switch Is Which?"	October 21, 1972	58-7
After Gus stays up all night working on architectural plans for a big client under the orders of Mr. Tycoonius, Laurie dons a fake mustache to fool the client into believing she's Gus.
8	"That's Show Biz"	October 28, 1972	58-8
When the circus comes to town, Gus gets tickets from his old school chum Hammus Terrificus.
9	"Double Dilemma"	November 4, 1972	58-9
When Precocia's drum performance conflicts with his bowling team's big match, Gus must find a way to be in two places at once. Note: This episode is a re-working of The Flintstones episode "Fred Strikes Out", which originally aired on March 2, 1962. Also "The Jetsons" episode "Las Venus" aired on December 16. 1962.
10	"A Funny Thing Happened on the Way to the Chariot Wash"	November 11, 1972	58-10
Mr. Tycoonius orders Gus to get his prized racing chariot washed, but the chariot is destroyed before Gus can return it.
11	"Buried Treasure"	November 18, 1972	58-11
Gus believes a treasure map he's found at the bottom of some junk leads to a fortune buried under the apartment building.
12	"Cyrano De Happius"	November 25, 1972	
Hap tries to fix up his friend with a beautiful cheerleader, but the cheerleader falls for Hap and Groovia starts dating Hap's friend.
13	"Father Of The Year"	December 2, 1972	58-13
Gus and Mr. Evictus compete in Rome's most prestigious competition, the Father of the Year awards.

== Comics ==
Gold Key produced a comic book based on the series from November 1972 to August 1973. Only four issues were published. Pete Alvarado drew the first three; Jack Manning drew the final issue.

== Home media ==
The first episode, "Double Date", is available on the DVD Saturday Morning Cartoons: 1970s Volume 1. On April 23, 2013, Warner Archive released The Roman Holidays: The Complete Series on DVD in region 1 as part of their Hanna–Barbera Classics Collection. This is a manufacture-on-demand (MOD) release, available exclusively through Warner's online store and Amazon.com.

== Appearances in other media ==
Manatee versions of the characters Laurie and Precocia Holiday and Mr. Tycoonius appear as sirens in the Jellystone! episode "Balloon Kids". The rap song in the episode features a reference to the year the series was originally released (1972). Gus and Laurie Holliday and their lion Brutus appeared in a season three episode "Spy Thriller" as characters in a Secret Squirrel film.
