= Erica Gavin =

American actress

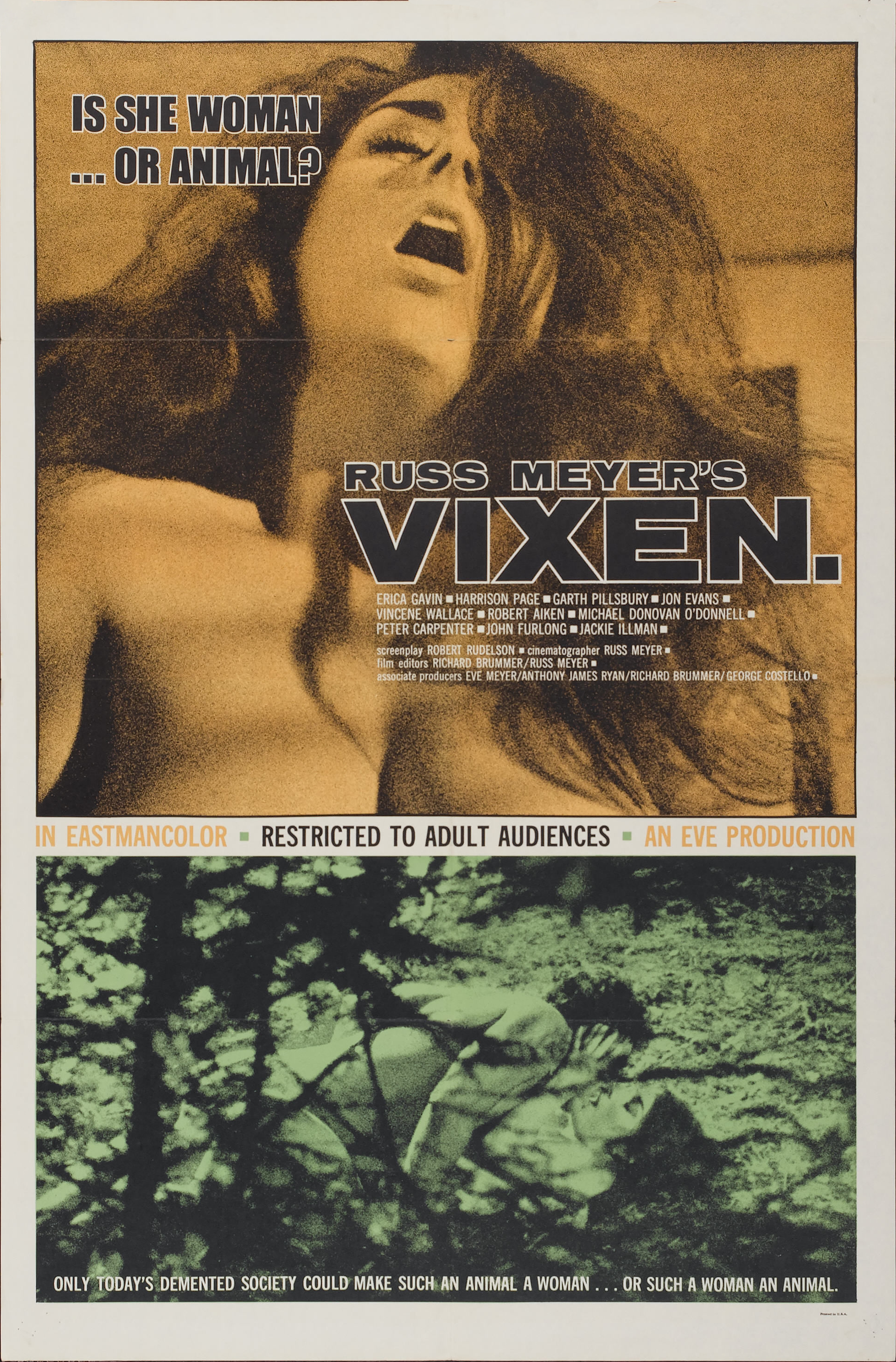
- Gavin on the poster for Vixen!
- Born: Donna Graff; July 22, 1947 (age 79); Los Angeles, California, US
- Occupation: Actress
- Years active: 1968–present
- Website: http://www.ericagavin.com/

Erica Gavin (born Donna Graff; July 22, 1947) is an American film actress best known for playing the title role in Russ Meyer's film Vixen! (1968).

== Early years ==
Gavin was born in Los Angeles, California, daughter of blacklisted actor Fred Graff and Madeleine Rosenteil. At age 19, she worked as a topless dancer in Hollywood with two other future Russ Meyer stars, Haji and Tura Satana. While waiting in a dentist's office, she saw an advertisement in Variety for women to audition for the new Russ Meyer movie Vixen! She auditioned and won the role, which launched her to stardom in low-budget independent films.

== Career ==
Following Vixen!, Gavin appeared in one more Russ Meyer film, Beyond the Valley of the Dolls, written by famed film critic Roger Ebert. She also appeared in Jonathan Demme's women-in-prison film Caged Heat. Filmink argued she should have become a bigger star.

== Personal life ==
Gavin resides in Los Angeles, California, where she works as a stylist and occasionally makes appearances at movie memorabilia conventions. She said in a 2006 interview that she is bisexual.

== Filmography ==
- Initiation (1968) - Jan
- Vixen! (1968) - Vixen Palmer
- Beyond the Valley of the Dolls (1970) - Roxanne
- Erika's Hot Summer (1971) - Erika
- Godmonster of Indian Flats (1973) - Girl at bar
- Caged Heat (1974) - Jacqueline Wilson
- 3 Stories About Evil (2008) - Mrs. Harris
