= J. J. North =

American actress

J.J. North
- Occupation: Actress
- Years active: 1993–1999

J. J. North is an actress, best known for her role in the science-fiction film Attack of the 60 Foot Centerfold (1995).

== Filmography ==
- Beauty School (1993)
- The Troma System (1993)
- Head Games (1993) (video)
- The New Video Vixens (1994)
- Animal Room (1995)
- Attack of the 60 Foot Centerfold (1995)
- Depraved (1995)
- Vampire Vixens from Venus (1995)
- Vicious Kiss (1995)
- Psycho Sisters 2: Beyond the Brink of Madness (1996)
- Red Lips II (1996)
- Vice Academy 5 (1996)
- Bikini Hotel (1997)
- Hybrid (1997)
- Psycho Sisters (1998)
- Hellblock 13 (1999) (V)
