= Every Girl Should Have One =

1978 film

- Directed by: Robert Hyatt
- Written by: Robert Hyatt
- Starring: Zsa Zsa Gabor; John LaZar; Sandra Vacey
- Music by: Johnny Pate
- Production company: Robert Fridley Productions
- Distributed by: Robert Fridley Productions; Nacional Vídeo (Brazil) (VHS)
- Release date: 1978
- Running time: 80 minutes
- Country: United States
- Language: English

Every Girl Should Have One is a 1978 whodunit independent film. In Brazil, the film is known as O Que Toda Mulher Tem. Its tagline was "a 14 Karat Caper". The film had a printed film format of 35 mm.

== Plot ==
A diamond theft takes place involving unlikely thieves, crazy lovers and fast-paced action.

== Cast ==
- Zsa Zsa Gabor - Olivia Wayne
- John LaZar - Roger Marks
- Sandra Vacey - Wendy
- Robert Alda - Adam Becker
- Alice Faye - Kathy
- Herb Vigran - Ambrose
- Hannah Dean - Ernestine
- Michael Heit - Frank
- Dan Barrows - Homer
- Daina House - Tina
- William Boyett - Detective Rand
- David Chow - Derek
- Dorothy Burham - Spider Woman
- Napoleon Whiting - Napoleon
- Hy Pyke - Willie
