= TPC Harding Park =

Municipal golf course in San Francisco, California, United States

- Location in the United States Location in California TPC Harding Park (San Francisco Bay Area)
- 37.724°N 122.493°W

Club information
- Location: San Francisco, California
- Established: 1925, 101 years ago
- Type: Public
- Owner: San Francisco Public Utilities Commission
- Operator: PGA Tour Golf Course Properties
- Total holes: 18 holes
- Tournaments: WGC-American Express Championship (2005), Presidents Cup (2009), Charles Schwab Cup Championship (2010, 2011, 2013); WGC-Cadillac Match Play (2015), PGA Championship (2020)
- Greens: Bentgrass (007, Tyee)
- Fairways: Poa annua, bentgrass, and ryegrass
- Website: tpc.com/hardingpark
- Designed by: Sam Whiting; Willie Watson
- Par: 72
- Length: 7,169 yards (6,555 m)
- Course rating: 74.1
- Slope rating: 129
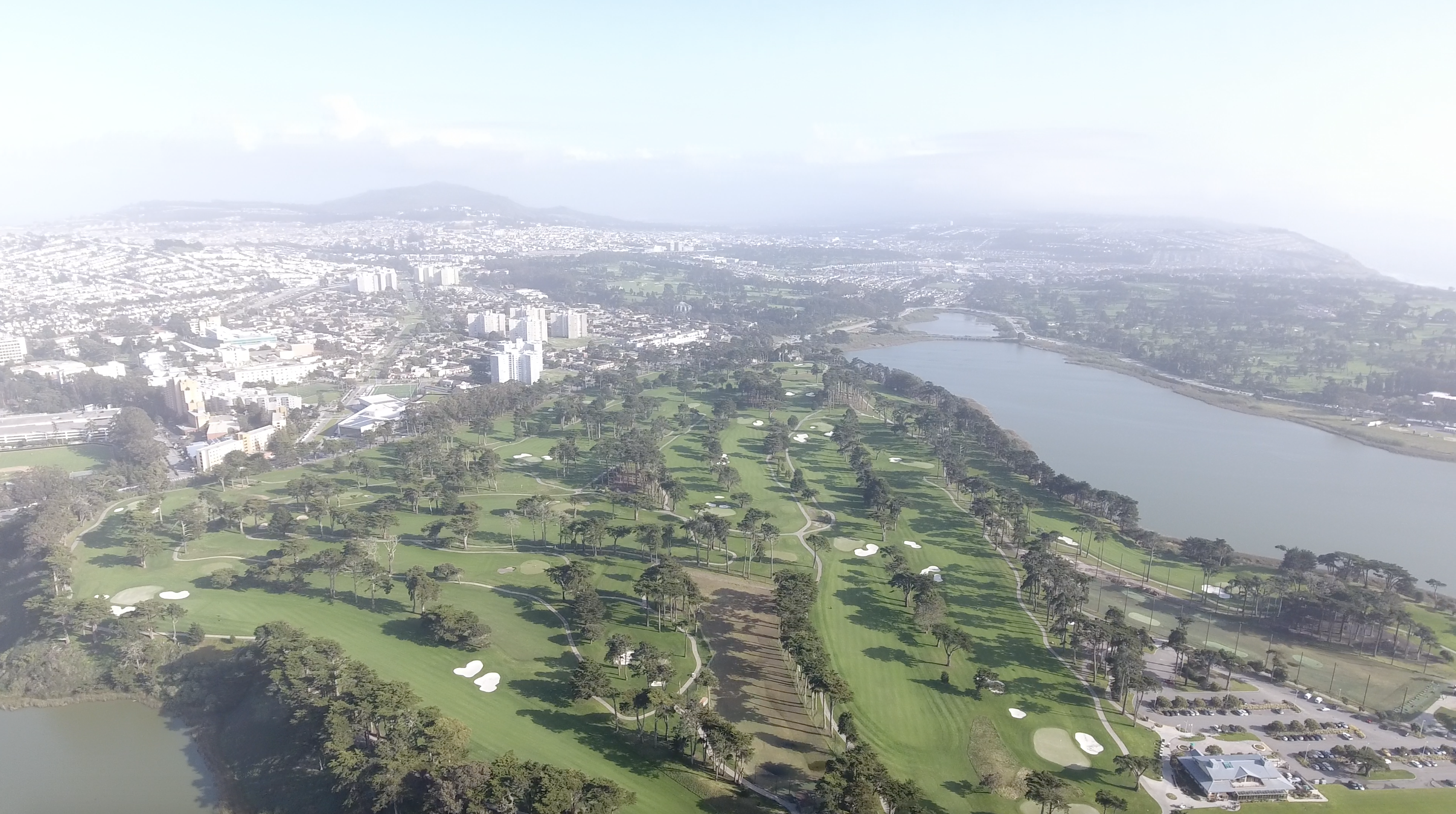
- Aerial view from north in 2018

TPC Harding Park, formerly Harding Park Golf Club and commonly known as Harding Park, is a municipal golf course located on the West Side of San Francisco, California. It is owned by the city and county of San Francisco.

It is now a part of the PGA Tour's Tournament Players Club (TPC) network of courses, following an agreement between the tour and the city that was announced on November 3, 2010. It is located in the southwest area of San Francisco, on the west side of San Francisco State University, and surrounded by Lake Merced on its other three sides. The entrance is at Harding Road, which connects to Skyline Boulevard on the east.

== History ==
Harding Park Golf Course opened 101 years ago on July 18, 1925. It is named after President Warren G. Harding, an avid golfer, who had died in office while visiting San Francisco two years earlier. The course covers 163-acre (0.66 km^{2}) along the shores of Lake Merced, in the city's southwest corner. Willie Watson and Sam Whiting, who also designed the nearby Olympic Club's Lake Course, drew up a design plan for a course at Harding Park for a price of $300.

The golf course attracted national attention, hosting a number of important tournaments, including The U.S. Amateur Public Links Championship in 1937 and again in 1956. In the 1960s, Harding Park became a regular stop for the PGA Tour at the Lucky International Open. The PGA Tour left Harding Park after the San Francisco Open Invitational in 1969, due to deteriorating conditions and antiquated facilities. Course conditions worsened during the 1970s and 1980s, as the city budget cuts wreaked havoc on course maintenance. The low point came in 1998, when Harding was used as a parking lot during the U.S. Open at the nearby Lake Course of the Olympic Club.

Around the turn of the century, Sandy Tatum, a prominent San Francisco attorney, champion golfer, and former United States Golf Association president, led a campaign to restore Harding Park to its former glory. He eventually got approval from former mayor Willie Brown to allow Arnold Palmer Golf Management, a Florida-based company, to renovate and operate the park. In 2001, however, the San Francisco Board of Supervisors, namely former District 7 Supervisor Tony Hall, opposed the project based on fear that Arnold Palmer's involvement in the project represented privatization of a municipally owned golf course. As opposition grew, Arnold Palmer backed out, primarily over concern about revenue estimates. Palmer Golf and the city could not agree on a greens fee schedule. The city's proposed management contract, at the urging of the Harding Park Men's Club, specified a percentage of tee times that would be held for city residents at a greatly reduced rate, albeit an increase over the previous rate.

When all hopes to renovate Harding Park seemed unrealistic and far fetched, Sean Elsbernd, Tony Hall's Chief of Staff helped to revive the project. He was the one who later succeeded Hall. He and Tatum convinced Hall that the renovation could be a significant revenue producer for the city, by attracting the PGA Tour back to town. They thought it would provide the adequate stimulus for the city to move forward. They also addressed funding concerns by tapping grant money from Proposition 12, a measure passed in 2000 to fund parks across California. But advocacy groups such as the Neighborhood Parks Council continued to oppose the project, claiming that renovating the golf course was not a priority for the city, and that those state grants should be used to help improve other recreation facilities across town. Despite opposition, the San Francisco Board of Supervisors unanimously passed the resolution to use Prop. 12 money in 2001, citing potential revenue for the city, should Harding become a regular host of professional golf events.

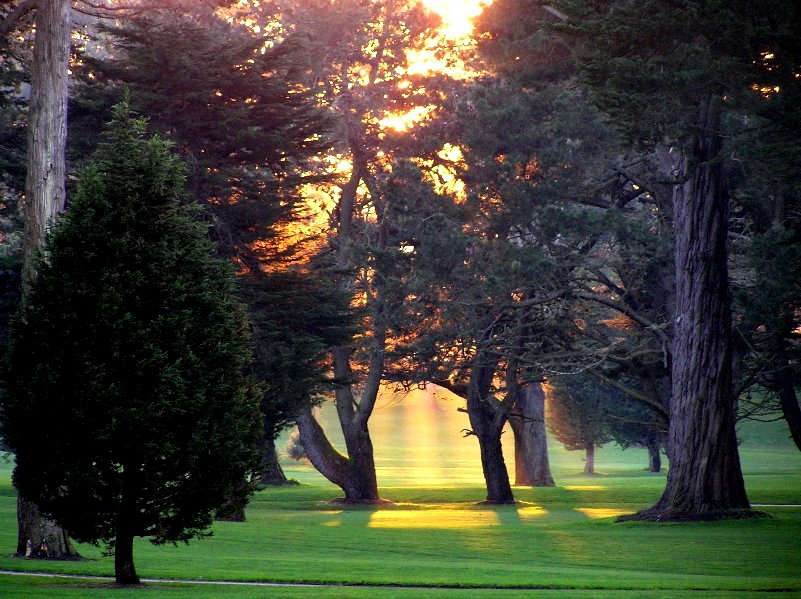
Harding Park Golf Course, winter 2006

Renovation finally began in the spring of 2002. The 15-month-long project expanded the course from 6,743 yards (6,166 m) to nearly 7,200 yards (6,580 m) in length, and upgraded the driving range and clubhouse to PGA Tour standards. The course property remained under the ownership of the city and county of San Francisco. The city's parks and recreation department is responsible for course maintenance, which remains an ongoing concern, for everyday players as well as for PGA Tour officials looking to conduct future events at the course.

Before the 2010 deal with the PGA Tour that made Harding Park a member of the TPC network, Kemper Sports operated the course, including the pro shop and tee-time reservations. Following the deal, which lasted through the spring of 2010, the course is now operated by the tour's Golf Course Properties arm for no management fee. Facilities have become world class and include a modern clubhouse and restaurant capable of hosting special events, and a full-sized practice range. The renovation budget also covered the park's picturesque and challenging nine-hole layout, The Fleming 9, named for John Fleming, the long-time San Francisco Parks' superintendent. The fee schedule includes a substantial discount for San Francisco city residents, and a smaller discount for residents of Bay Area counties.

On August 22, 2003, the Harding Park Golf Course was officially reopened. Since the renovation's completion, Harding Park has hosted several men's professional golf tournaments.

== Tournaments hosted ==
Having hosted the PGA Tour's Lucky International Open from 1961 to 1969, Harding Park did not see elite tournament golf again until 2005 when it hosted the WGC-American Express Championship. Following that event, an agreement between the city and the PGA Tour was reached whereby several more PGA Tour events were scheduled to be played at Harding Park; The course hosted the 2009 Presidents Cup, the 2015 WGC-Cadillac Match Play, the 2020 PGA Championship. Harding Park has also hosted the Champions Tour's season-ending Charles Schwab Cup Championship in 2010, 2011, and 2013.

== Scorecard ==
TPC Harding Park
Tee	Rating/Slope	1	2	3	4	5	6	7	8	9	Out	10	11	12	13	14	15	16	17	18	In	Total
Championship	74.3 / 129	395	449	183	606	429	473	344	230	525	3634	562	200	494	428	467	405	336	175	468	3535	7169
Blue	72.9 / 126	395	430	165	580	395	440	335	200	495	3435	550	185	480	405	440	405	330	175	440	3410	6845
White	70.5 / 121	375	400	155	540	365	390	325	190	475	3215	530	155	450	375	410	375	310	165	420	3190	6405
SI	Men's	13	3	9	1	15	5	11	7	17		4	12	16	14	6	10	8	18	2
Par	Men's	4	4	3	5	4	4	4	3	5	36	5	3	5	4	4	4	4	3	4	36	72
Par	Women's	4	4	3	5	4	4	4	3	5	36	5	3	5	4	4	4	4	3	5	37	73
SI	Women's	17	3	15	1	11	9	13	5	7		2	8	16	6	10	12	14	18	4
Red	M: 68.1 / 116 W: 73.4 / 126	345	360	135	500	335	350	305	170	455	2955	500	125	410	365	370	345	280	125	400	2920	5875
