= Eugene Selvage =

American businessman (1896–1993)

- Born: Eugene S. Selvage; August 26, 1896; Eureka, California, U.S.
- Died: 1993 (aged 96–97)
- Education: UC Berkeley School of Law
- Occupation: Businessman
- Known for: Owner of the Lucky Lager Brewing Company, founder of the Lucky International Open
- Spouse: Jeanne Sexsmith
- Children: 2
- Parent(s): Thomas H. Selvage; Luna M. Shattuck Selvage

Eugene "Gene" S. Selvage (1896–1993) was the owner of Lucky Lager Brewing Company and a founder of the Lucky International Open.

== Personal life ==
Eugene Selvage was born in Eureka, California, on August 26, 1896. He was the son of Thomas H. Selvage, a Republican California State senator and Luna M. Shattuck Selvage. In 1917, Selvage enlisted in the United States Navy, was commissioned a naval aviator, with the rank of ensign, and continued in the service until August 1919. A graduate of the University of California, Berkeley School of Law, he practiced law after the war. Selvage married Jeanne Sexsmith and they had two children, Marilyn Jeanne and Jeannette Lorraine. He is survived by his five grandchildren Jeanne Wise, Dan and Tom Avila, and Geoff and James Hancock and great-grandchild Marilyn Wendt.

Selvage was an avid sportsman, and achieved amateur standing in skeet-shooting and golfing. He also owned Lucky Livestock Company and Lucky Hereford Ranch in Gilroy, California.

== Lucky Lager Brewing Company ==
Selvage was the founder and owner of the General Brewing Company, which produced Lucky Lager. The General Brewing Company was incorporated in California in 1933 and headquartered in San Francisco. General Brewing became the Lucky Lager Brewing Company in 1948 and began building and acquiring new breweries throughout the Western states. Under Selvage's leadership as owner and CEO, Lucky Lager achieved phenomenal growth in the 1950s, and for more than a decade Lucky Lager beer was the sales leader in the entire West. In 1961, Selvage retired as CEO, but was retained to serve as chairman of the board.

Selvage served as president of the California Brewers Association.

== Lucky International Open ==
Selvage was a founder of the Lucky International Open. An avid golfer and fan, Selvage believed that the San Francisco Bay Area should play a major role in professional golf. He sponsored the Lucky International Open via his company throughout the 1960s, until the tournament disbanded in 1969.

Selvage was close friends and an early sponsor of Masters champion George Archer. In fact, Archer received his nickname "Golfing Cowboy" as a result of a summer job in his youth spent at Selvage's Lucky Hereford Ranch.
