= Lucky Lager =

American lager beer brand

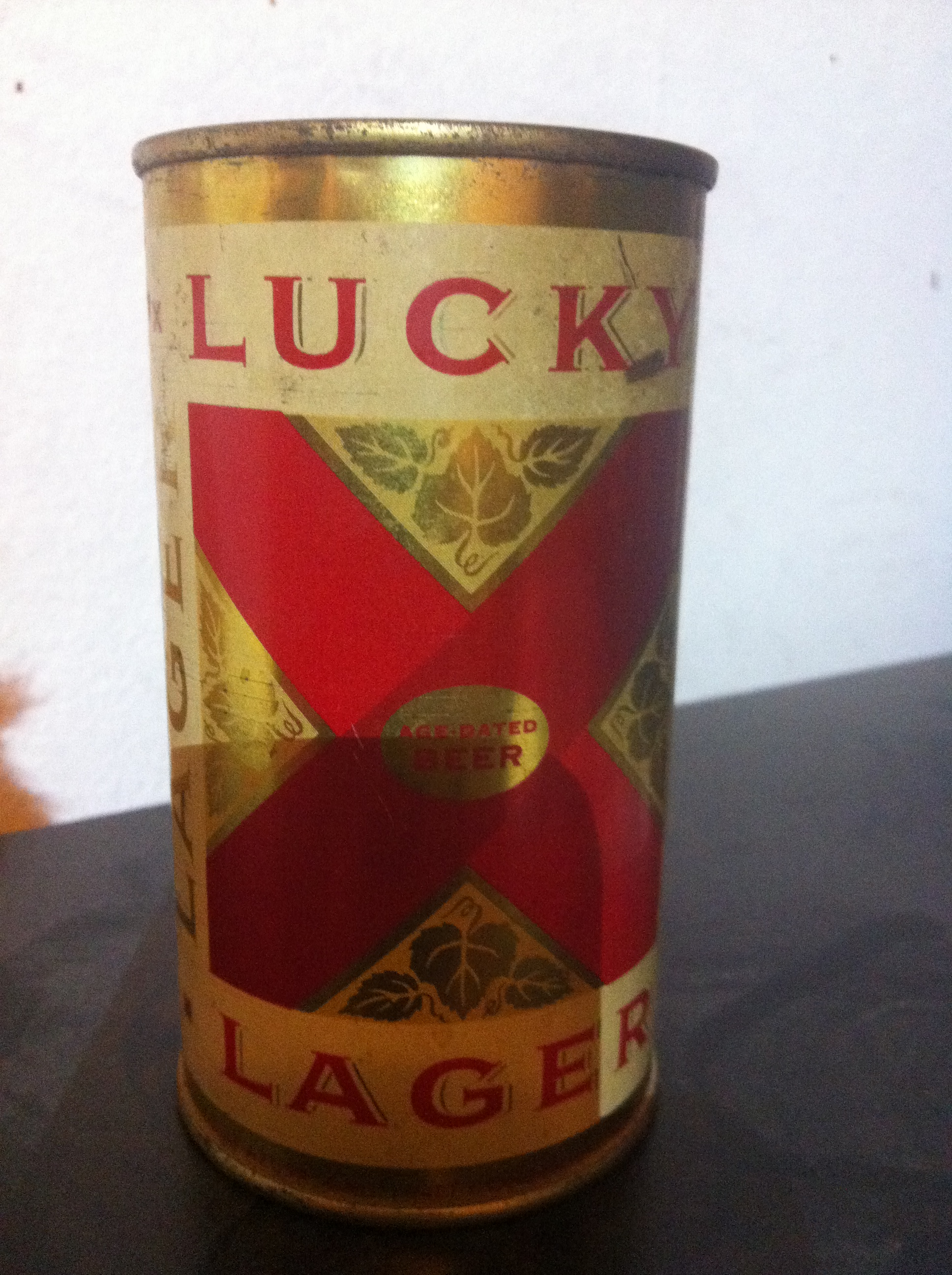
- A Lucky Lager can from 1958
- Origin: San Francisco, California, U.S.

Lucky Lager is an American lager brand whose U.S. brewing and distribution rights are held by the Pabst Brewing Company. Introduced in 1934 by the San Francisco-based General Brewing Company, the beer was widely distributed in the Western United States during the mid-20th century. In 2019, Pabst revived the brand in the San Francisco Bay Area, with production by 21st Amendment Brewery in San Leandro.

== History ==
=== Origins ===
The General Brewing Company was founded in San Francisco, California by Eugene Selvage (who remained the owner and chief executive officer until 1961). Eugene teamed up with Paul C. von Gontard, a grandson of Aldophus Busch, and German brewmaster Julius Kerber, to launch a state-of-the-art brewery that could brew beer that rivalled those made in Europe. Lucky Lager, the first beer of General Brewing Company, was commercially introduced in 1934. That same year, General Brewing Company also formed a strategic partnership with Coast Breweries in Vancouver Island, British Columbia, as part of a consortium of several Canadian breweries. The General Brewing company expanded and opened Lucky Lager Brewing Company, a second brewery in Azusa, California, in 1949. Later in the 1950s and 1960s, the expansion also reached Vancouver, Washington, and Salt Lake City, Utah.

=== Early marketing and expansion ===
Lucky Lager was promoted in San Francisco through newspaper, billboard and streetcar advertising. Early advertisements emphasized German-style brewing methods, aging and the quality of the ingredients. By 1937, Lucky Lager had become the second-best-selling beer in California. Beginning in 1935, the company also used taste tests as part of its advertising.

General Brewing invested approximately $1 million in its San Francisco brewery, which was designed by architect Frederick H. Meyer in collaboration with brewery engineer George L. Lehle. The facility initially had a production capacity of approximately 100,000 barrels per year. The company emphasized aging and automated handling in its production and marketing, and posted a $1,000 bond as a guarantee of the beer's advertised age date.

After World War II, General Brewing expanded its production capacity, including facilities in Azusa, California, Vancouver, Washington, and Salt Lake City, Utah.

At the same time, the Maier Brewery was producing Brew 102, a favorite beer in postwar Southern California.

=== 1950s and 1960s ===
Lucky Lager expanded its distribution throughout the Western United States during the 1950s. This was coupled with continued distribution expansion in an effort to saturate the western market. By 1962, Lucky Lager was producing and selling over two million barrels of beer per year.

In 1958, Coast Breweries was purchased by Canadian Labatt Brewery, which continued to brew Lucky Lager.

Lucky Lager Brewing Company changed its name back to General Brewing between 1963 and 1969 and then changed its name to Lucky Breweries, Inc. in 1969. As the national brands moved into California in the early 1960s, Lucky Lager's sales began to falter. An effort to increase sales with younger drinkers led to the ill-fated introduction of King Snedley's Beer, an alternate brand in addition to Lucky. According to some accounts, King Snedley's was just Lucky Lager repackaged with a different brand and marketed toward counterculture consumers. The new brand flopped and was withdrawn from the market, though it reappeared briefly in 1975. As sales continued to decline, the Salt Lake City brewery was closed in 1967.

=== 1970s and beyond ===
In 1971, businessman Paul Kalmanovitz acquired Lucky Lager Brewing and merged it with Maier Brewing Company to form the General Brewing Company, with S&P Corporation as its parent company.

The Azusa brewery was closed immediately. The San Francisco brewery was closed in 1978. This left Vancouver, Washington, and Cranston, Rhode Island, as the only locations where Lucky Lager was brewed. In the late 1970s, General Brewing took advantage of the "generic brand" marketing craze in the US by producing beer with plain white labels emblazoned with the word BEER. Rumors surfaced that BEER was simply repackaged Lucky Lager. When the generic craze died, and the microbrewery movement took off, General had difficulty maintaining profitability as a brewer of inexpensive beers. The fact that Lucky Lager tasted no worse than expensively advertised "premium" brands such as Budweiser or Miller did not impress a market of drinkers where image was frequently more important than taste. The brewery's fortunes began to decline.

After the Vancouver brewery shut down in July 1985, the Olympia Brewing Company in Tumwater, Washington, began to produce Lucky Lager in the US. In July 2003, this brewery was also closed. Lucky Lager continued to be sold in its original Northern California range at Lucky Stores supermarkets, which although not affiliated, sold Lucky Lager as an unofficial value store brand, until Lucky Stores supermarkets were bought out by Albertson's and the name of the supermarkets was changed around 2000.

=== Canadian production ===
Lucky Lager was brewed in Victoria, British Columbia, until 1982, when Labatt transferred production from Vancouver Island to Edmonton, Alberta. The Victoria brewery was subsequently demolished. Lucky Lager has continued to be produced in Canada under Labatt ownership.

== Packaging ==
=== Stubby bottles ===
Lucky Lager was sold in 11 oz stubby bottles featuring rebus puzzles beneath the bottle caps. The bottle format was discontinued following the closure of the Tumwater brewery.

=== Rebus caps ===
During the 1970s and 1980s, Lucky Lager and other brands controlled by Paul Kalmanovitz featured rebus puzzles on the underside of their bottle caps.

=== Label ===
Packaging was a recurring element of Lucky Lager's marketing. Its early label featured a red cross design with a circle displaying the beer's date and the words "Lucky Lager" across the arms of the cross. The design was created by Charles Stafford Duncan, art director at the San Francisco office of McCann Erickson. In 1939, the Pacific Advertising Club Association recognized the packaging, and Duncan's design also received an Altman Prize from the National Academy of Design.

The original label for Lucky Lager has seen many changes. The large red cross was made less prominent in the 1950s, but it remained on the labels and on advertising. The label was redesigned and the cross was again made smaller in 1962, although it was still the design's focus. A subsequent design in the late '60s got rid of the cross entirely and replaced it with a large cursive "L". With the rise of premium beer, led by Coors and Miller, Lucky Lager changed the logo in an attempt to maintain itself relevant in the beer market. With the subsequent decline and end of Lucky Lager in the US, the beer continues to operate with an ever-changing identity under the control of Labatt, owners of the brand rights in Canada.

== Advertising ==
=== Original branding ===
The original advertising for the Lucky Lager brand centered on the large X emblem present on packaging and other marketing material, including the "Bonded Beer" slogan and age-dated beer canning. Lucky Lager was the first beer to include the date the beer was brewed on the can. This remained a central tenet of its advertising through the middle 1960s.

One of the more unusual promotions was the "Talking Package". It was a robot made of Lucky Beer containers; its body was a beer barrel, the neck, arms and legs were made of beer cans, and the head and feet were large bottles. One hand held a beer bottle, as well. Inside was a microphone and a speaker. An operator hid nearby where he could see the people in front of the robot. Spectators could go up to the "talking package" and ask him questions about Lucky Lager and the Lucky robot would respond.

=== Advertising slogans ===
During the early 1950s, one of the key brand slogans was "It's Lucky when you live in California." It was seen on many billboards throughout California. As its distribution area grew, it became: "It's Lucky when you live in America".

In 2002, Cumberland, British Columbia, was promoted as the "Luckiest Town in Canada" because of the local sales of Lucky Lager.

=== Partnerships, sponsorships, and endorsers ===
Lucky Lager provided endorsements and advertising for the San Francisco Seals throughout the 1930s, '40s, and '50s. It garnered endorsements from Boston Pops conductor Arthur Fiedler and tennis star Jack Kramer during the 1950s.

Lucky Lager sponsored the radio programme ''Lucky Lager Dance Time'', which was carried by multiple stations in the western United States. Participating stations used a common playlist while local announcers presented the programme.

In the 1960s, Lucky Lager Brewing Company sponsored the Lucky International Open. Lucky's 1963 McCann Erickson ad campaign included the song "Go Lively: Get Lucky", by Richard Adler.

=== Jingles, commercials, and print ads ===
Early television commercials for Lucky included song-and-dance sequences and used the slogan "Aged Just Right". Other advertisements emphasized the beer's aging process and presented comparisons with competing beers. Advertising before the mid-1960s frequently used imagery associated with the Western United States, including beaches, ranches and mountains.

== In popular culture ==
In the 1956 film Please Murder Me, a Lucky Lager billboard is in the background in one scene. In the 1961 film The Exiles, the characters are drinking Lucky Lager and local liquor stores are advertising the sale of Lucky Lager. The brand also appears in the barroom brawl scene in the 1968 movie The Devil's Brigade. In the 1965 film, A Patch of Blue, a Lucky beer truck appears in one scene. In the 1968 film "Vixen!", Lucky Lager is being consumed in the backwoods of British Columbia. Jack Nicholson's character drinks Lucky Lager during the 1970 movie Five Easy Pieces. In the film The Bad News Bears (1976), Walter Matthau's character gives the team Lucky Lagers to celebrate. Lucky Lager is featured in the 1982 Black Flag video TV Party. In the television show Greg the Bunny, a Lucky Lager sign appears in the "Rabbit Redux" episode. Cans of Lucky Lager appear in the film The Van, being sold out of a cooler at a van show. In the 1993 film Kalifornia, Lucky Lager is the favorite drink of Brad Pitt's character Early Grace.
