= Vixen! =

1968 film by Russ Meyer

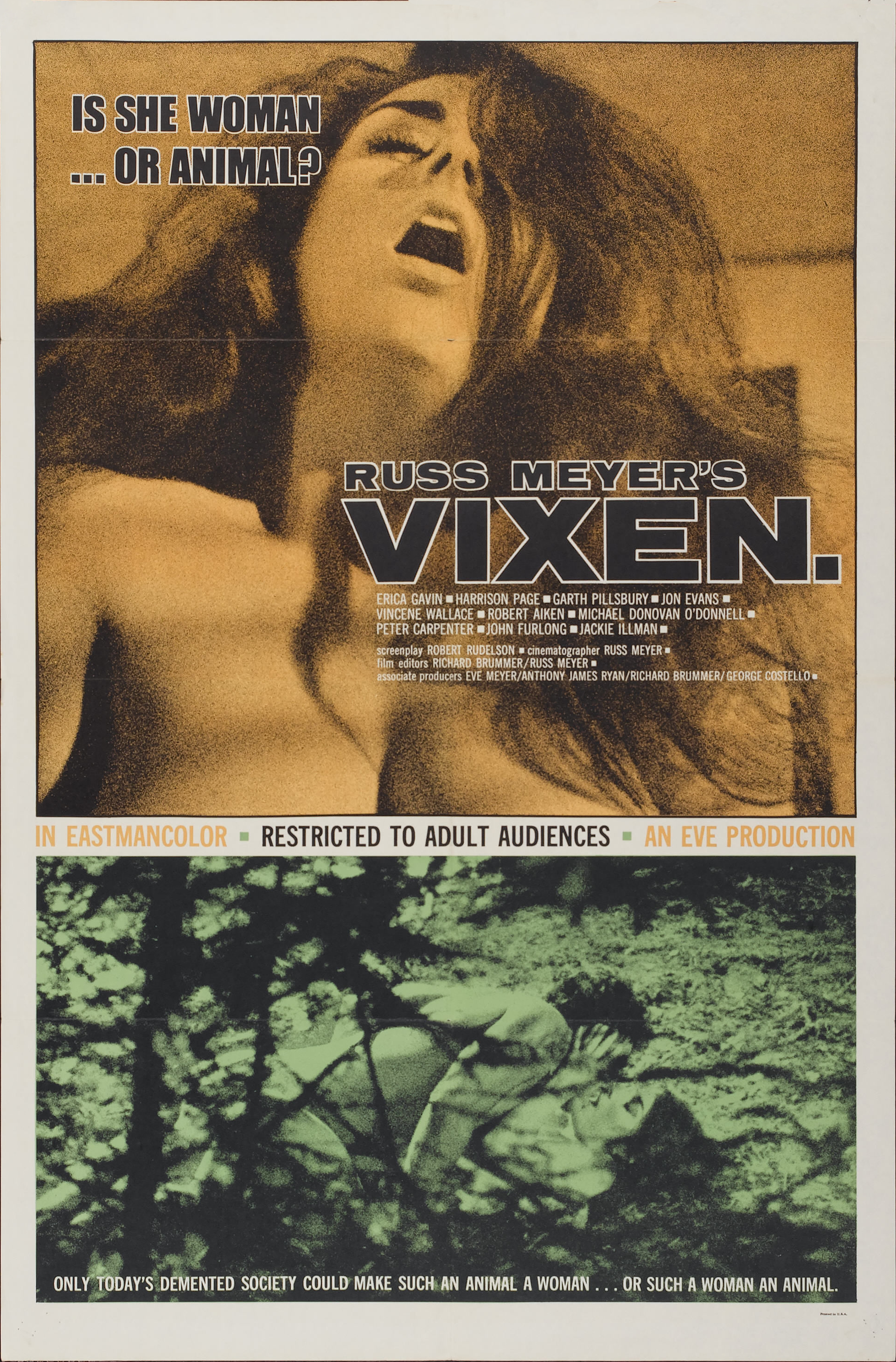
- US film poster
- Directed by: Russ Meyer
- Screenplay by: Robert Rudelson
- Story by: Russ Meyer; Anthony James Ryan
- Produced by: Russ Meyer
- Starring: Erica Gavin; Garth Pillsbury; Harrison Page; Jon Evans; Vincene Wallace; Robert Aiken; Michael Donovan O'Donnell; Peter Carpenter; John Furlong; Jackie Illman
- Cinematography: Russ Meyer
- Edited by: Richard S. Brummer; Russ Meyer
- Production company: EVE Productions
- Distributed by: Coldstream Films
- Release date: October 22, 1968
- Running time: 70 minutes
- Country: United States
- Language: English
- Budget: $73,000
- Box office: $8 million

Vixen! is a 1968 American satiric softcore sexploitation film directed by Russ Meyer, co-written by Meyer and Anthony James Ryan, and starring Erica Gavin as the title character, who sexually manipulates everyone she meets. The story's taboo-violations mount quickly, including themes of incest and racism.

The first film to receive an X rating for its explicit sex scenes, it was a breakthrough success for Meyer.

== Plot ==
At a Canadian wilderness resort, sultry and sexually assertive Vixen Palmer lives happily married with her husband Tom, a bush pilot and owner of a tourist lodge. The hypersexual Vixen nevertheless seduces anyone within reach including a Mountie, a couple her husband brings home as clients – the husband first, his wife later, and eventually her own brother, Judd. The only person she will not have sex with is Judd's friend Niles, an African American Vietnam War deserter, whom Vixen verbally abuses with racist insults.

A wealthy Irish tourist (who is really a Marxist Irish Republican Army sympathizer) entices the couple to fly him and – against Vixen's protestations – Niles to the United States. In the air, he attempts to hijack the small Cessna 177 Cardinal to Cuba, taking Vixen and her pilot husband as hostages. Niles is reluctant to take sides, but, after some altercations, Tom and Niles overwhelm the perpetrator. In return for his support, Tom helps Niles escape the US customs; as they are parting, Niles and Vixen conciliate.

At the end of the film, her husband takes on another couple and Vixen smiles in a sinister and disturbing way, apparently planning to seduce them. The final slide reads "The End?"

== Production ==
Erica Gavin was a dancer in clubs who knew women who had acted in other Meyer films. She answered an advertisement seeking actors for Vixen and was cast.

Meyer recalled, "Bravely I went up to the location for Vixen without a leading lady and left a couple of my henchmen to try to find somebody. It's always difficult. But Erica had a curious quality about her. She didn't have the greatest body, you know. She didn't have the up-thrust breasts like the others."

The film was shot in Miranda, California. Many of the opening scenes were filmed in Victoria, British Columbia, Canada.

During the film, assistant director George Costello had a relationship with Gavin, which led to the end of Costello's professional relationship with Meyer. Erica Gavin, on the other hand, went on to shoot one more movie with Meyer.

Meyer said the sex scene between Vixen and her brother "was the best of them all. She [Erica Gavin] really displayed an animal quality that I've never been able to achieve before – the way she grunted and hung in there and did her lines. It was a really remarkable job ... I've done a lot of jokey screwing but there's something about Erica and her brother that was just remarkable ... [it] really represents the way I like to screw."

== Reception ==
The film was a huge box office success. Meyer later attributed this to the fact "it was so frank for its time. And a lot of it had to be attributed to Erica Gavin. She had a quality that also appealed to women. And women came in great numbers."

Meyer later elaborated:

I think an awful lot of women would have liked to have been able to act like Vixen a few times in their lives. To have an afternoon in which they could have laid three guys, have an affair with their best girl friend, that would straighten a lot of people out ... Everything she [Vixen] touched was improved. She didn't destroy, she helped. If there was a marriage that was kind of dying on the vine, she injected something into it which made it better ... I think that every man at one time or another would thoroughly enjoy running into an aggressive female like Vixen ... She was like a switch-hitter. You show this girl as being like a utility outfielder: she could cover all the positions.

Meyer said he used sex in the film to make points about racial bigotry and communism.

=== Critical reception ===
The Los Angeles Times called the film "good clean fun for adults ... may well be Meyer's best film to date".

The New York Times called it "slick, lascivious".

Roger Ebert called it "the quintessential Russ Meyer film ... Meyer's ability to keep his movies light and farcical took the edge off the sex for people seeing their first skin-flick. By the time he made Vixen, Meyer had developed a directing style so open, direct and good-humored that it dominated his material. He was willing to use dialogue so ridiculous ... situations so obviously tongue-in-cheek, characters so incredibly stereotyped and larger than life, that even his most torrid scenes usually managed to get outside themselves. Vixen was not only a good skin-flick, but a merciless satire on the whole genre."

== See also ==
- List of American films of 1968
