= Forrest J Ackerman =

American writer and collector (1916–2008)

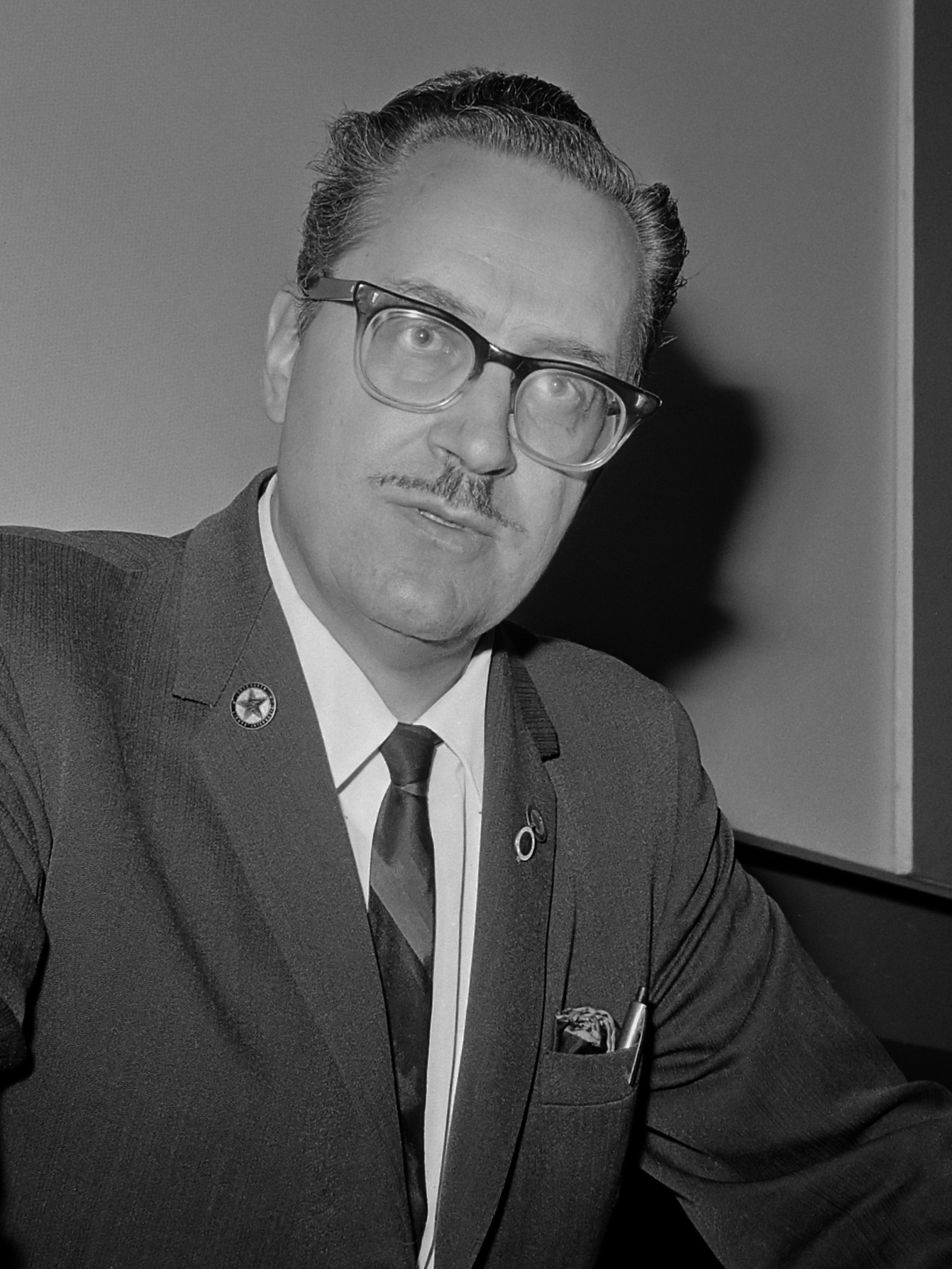
- Ackerman in 1965
- Born: Forrest James Ackerman; November 24, 1916; Los Angeles, California, U.S.
- Died: December 4, 2008 (aged 92); Los Angeles, California, U.S.
- Occupations: Magazine editor; science fiction writer; literary agent; actor

Forrest James Ackerman (November 24, 1916 – December 4, 2008) was an American magazine editor; science fiction writer, and literary agent; a founder of science fiction fandom; a leading expert on science fiction, horror, and fantasy films; a prominent advocate of the Esperanto language; and one of the world's most avid collectors of genre books and film memorabilia. He was based in Los Angeles, California.

As a literary agent, Ackerman represented such science fiction authors as Ray Bradbury, Isaac Asimov, A. E. van Vogt, Curt Siodmak, and L. Ron Hubbard. For more than 70 years, he was one of science fiction's staunchest spokesmen and promoters. He was the founding editor and principal writer of the American magazine Famous Monsters of Filmland, published by Warren Publishing. He co-created the character Vampirella, whose name was a play on that of the titular character in the 1968 Jane Fonda film Barbarella.

Ackerman also acted in films from the 1950s into the 21st century. He appears in several documentaries related to this period in popular culture, like Famous Monster: Forrest J Ackerman (directed by Michael R. MacDonald and written by Ian Johnston), which premiered at the Egyptian Theatre in March 2009, during the Forrest J Ackerman tribute; The Ackermonster Chronicles! (a 2012 documentary about Ackerman by writer and filmmaker Jason V. Brock); and Charles Beaumont: The Short Life of Twilight Zone's Magic Man, about late author Charles Beaumont, a former client of The Ackerman Agency.

Also called "Forry", "Uncle Forry", "The Ackermonster", "Dr. Acula", "Forjak", "4e", and "4SJ", Ackerman was central to the formation, organization, and spread of science fiction fandom and a key figure in the wider cultural perception of science fiction as a literary, art, and film genre. Famous for his word play and neologisms, he coined the genre nickname "sci-fi". In 1953, he was voted "#1 Fan Personality" by the members of the World Science Fiction Society, a unique Hugo Award never granted to anyone else.

Ackerman was also among the first and most outspoken advocates of Esperanto in the science fiction community.

== Early years ==
Ackerman was born Forrest James Ackerman (though he referred to himself from the early 1930s onward as "Forrest J Ackerman" with no period after the middle initial), on November 24, 1916, in Los Angeles, to Carroll Cridland (née Wyman; 1883–1977) and William Schilling Ackerman (1892–1951).

Ackerman's father, William, chief statistician and assistant to the vice-president in charge of transportation for the Associated Oil Company was from New York and his mother (the daughter of architect George Wyman) was from Ohio; she was nine years older than her husband.

Ackerman attended the University of California, Berkeley, during the 1934–1935 academic year; thereafter, he worked as a film projectionist and at odd jobs with fan friends. On August 15, 1942, he enlisted in the U.S. Army, where he rose to the rank of staff sergeant before being honorably discharged in 1945. He passed his entire time in service at Fort MacArthur in the San Pedro neighborhood of Los Angeles, ultimately serving as editor of the base newspaper.

== Career and fandom ==
Ackerman and Morojo at the 1st Worldcon (1939, NYC), in the "futuristicostumes" she created for them

Ackerman saw his first "imagi-movie" in 1922 (One Glorious Day), purchased his first science fiction magazine, Amazing Stories, in 1926, created the Boys' Scientifiction Club in 1930 ("girl-fans were as rare as unicorn's horns in those days"). He contributed to the first science fiction fanzine, The Time Traveler. He was an early member of the Los Angeles Science Fantasy Society and remained active in it for many decades.

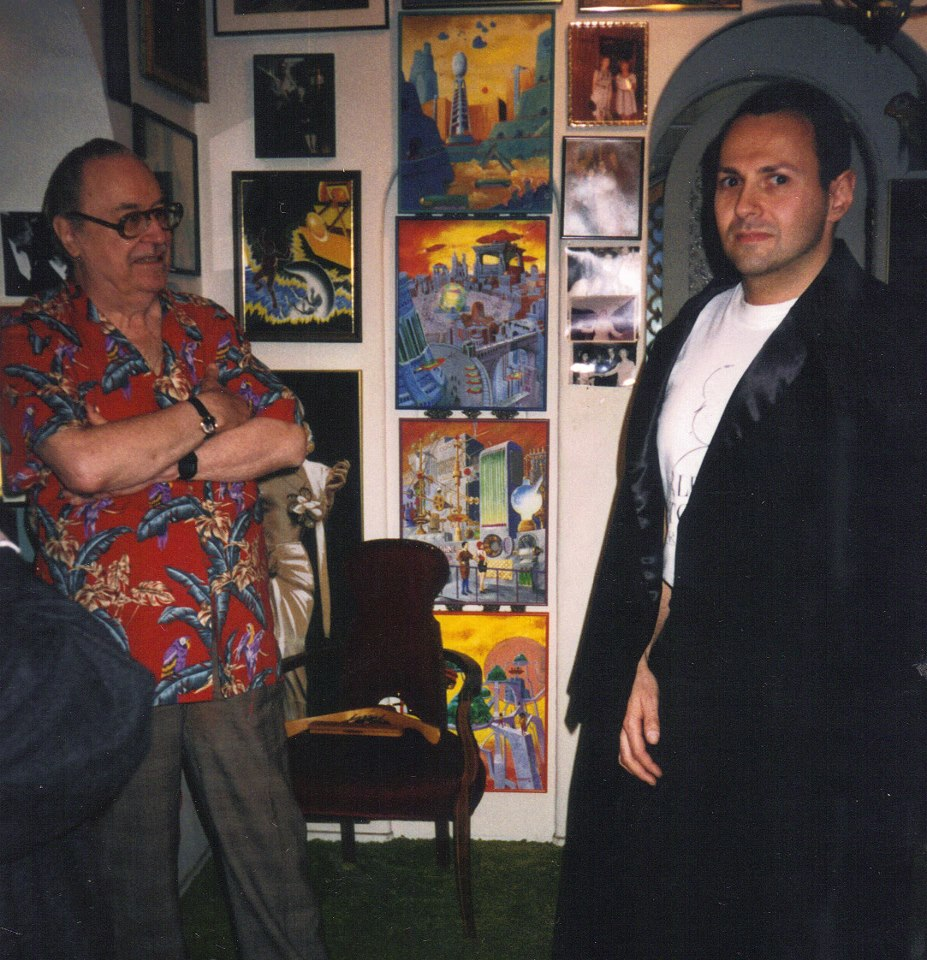
Letting a fan try on the cape worn by Bela Lugosi in Plan 9 from Outer Space (1957, directed by Ed Wood)

Ackerman attended the 1st World Science Fiction Convention in 1939, where he wore the first "futuristicostume" (designed and created by his girlfriend, Myrtle R Douglas, better known as Morojo), which sparked decades of fan costuming thereafter, the latest incarnation of which is cosplay. He attended every Worldcon but two thereafter during his lifetime.

In 1994, the International Costumers' Guild (ICG) presented a special award to Ackerman at Conadian, the 52nd Worldcon, recognizing him as the "Father of Convention Costuming" for wearing his "futuristicostume" at the 1st Worldcon.

Ackerman invited Ray Bradbury to attend the Los Angeles Chapter of the Science Fiction League, then meeting weekly at Clifton's Cafeteria in downtown Los Angeles. The club changed its name to the Los Angeles Science Fantasy Society during the period it was meeting at the restaurant. Among the writers frequenting the club were Robert A. Heinlein, Emil Petaja, Fredric Brown, Henry Kuttner, Leigh Brackett, and Jack Williamson. Bradbury often attended meetings with his friend Ray Harryhausen; the two Rays had been introduced to each other by Ackerman. With $90 from Ackerman and Morojo, Bradbury launched a fanzine, Futuria Fantasia, in 1939, which ran for four issues.

Ackerman was an early member of the Los Angeles Chapter of the Science Fiction League and became so active in and important to the club that in essence he ran it, including (after the name change) the Los Angeles Science Fantasy Society, a prominent regional fan organization, as well as the National Fantasy Fan Federation (N3F). Together with Morojo, he edited and produced Imagination!, later renamed Voice of the Imagi-Nation (which in 1996 would be awarded the Retro Hugo for Best Fanzine of 1946, and in 2014 for 1939), which was nominally the club fanzine for the LASFS.

In the decades that followed, Ackerman amassed an extremely large collection of science fiction, fantasy, and horror film memorabilia, which, until 2002, he maintained in an 18-room home and museum known as the "Son of Ackermansion". (The original Ackermansion where he lived from the early 1950s until the mid-1970s was at 915 S. Sherbourne Drive in Los Angeles; the site is now an apartment building.) This second house, in the Los Feliz district of Los Angeles, contained some 300,000 books and pieces of film and science-fiction memorabilia.

From 1951 to 2002, Ackerman entertained some 50,000 fans at open houses – including, on one such evening, a group of 186 fans and professionals that included astronaut Buzz Aldrin. Ackerman was a board member of the Seattle Science Fiction Museum and Hall of Fame (now Museum of Pop Culture), where many items of his collection are now displayed.

Ackerman knew many of the writers of science fiction in the first half of the twentieth century. As a literary agent, he represented some 200 writers, and he served as agent of record for many long-lost authors, thereby allowing their work to be reprinted in anthologies. He was Ed Wood's "illiterary" agent. Ackerman was credited with nurturing and even inspiring the careers of several early contemporaries like Ray Bradbury, Ray Harryhausen, Charles Beaumont, Marion Zimmer Bradley, and L. Ron Hubbard. He kept all of the stories submitted to his magazine, even the ones he rejected; Stephen King has stated that Ackerman showed up to a King book signing with a copy of a story King had submitted for publication when he was 11.

Ackerman had 50 stories published, including collaborations with A. E. van Vogt, Francis Flagg, Robert A. W. Lowndes, Marion Zimmer Bradley, Donald Wollheim and Catherine Moore, and the world's shortest – one letter of the alphabet. His stories have been translated into six languages. Ackerman named the comic-book character Vampirella and wrote the origin story for the comic.

Ackerman also authored several lesbian stories under the name "Laurajean Ermayne" for Vice Versa and provided publishing assistance in the early days of the Daughters of Bilitis. He was dubbed an "honorary lesbian" at a DOB party. Ackerman's involvement with lesbian fiction led to him becoming the first heterosexual guest of honor at Gaylaxicon. It also caused him to be found in violation of the Comstock laws for sending "obscene materials" to another man through the mail while both of them were pretending to be lesbians.

Through his magazine, Famous Monsters of Filmland (1958–1983), Ackerman introduced the history of the science fiction, fantasy, and horror film genres to a generation of young readers. He also contributed to film magazines from all around the world, including the Spanish-language La Cosa: Cine Fantástico magazine from Argentina, where he had a monthly column for more than four years. In the 1960s, Ackerman organized the publication of an English translation in the U.S. of the German science fiction series Perry Rhodan, the longest-running science fiction series in history. These were published by Ace Books from 1969 through 1977. Ackerman's German-speaking wife Wendayne ("Wendy") did most of the translation. The American books were issued with varying frequency from one to as many as four per month. Ackerman also used the paperback series to promote science fiction short stories, including his own on occasion. These "magabooks" or "bookazines" also included a film review section, known as "Scientifilm World", and letters from readers. The American series came to an end when the management of Ace changed, and the new management decided that the series was too juvenile for their taste. The last Ace issue was #118, which corresponded to German issue #126 as some of the Ace editions contained two of the German issues, and three of the German issues had been skipped. Ackerman later published translations of German issues #127 through #145 on his own under the Master Publications imprint. (The original German series continues today and passed issue #2800 in 2015.)

== Appearances in film, television, and music ==
A lifelong fan of science fiction "B-movies", Ackerman appeared in more than 210 films, including parts in many monster movies and science fiction films (Dracula vs. Frankenstein, The Howling, The Aftermath, Scalps, Return of the Living Dead Part II, Innocent Blood), more traditional "imagi-movies" (The Time Travelers, Future War), spoofs and comedies (Amazon Women on the Moon, The Wizard of Speed and Time, Curse of the Queerwolf, Transylvania Twist, Hard to Die, Nudist Colony of the Dead, Attack of the 60 Foot Centerfold) and at least one major music video (Michael Jackson's Thriller). His Bacon number is 2.

In 1961, Ackerman narrated the record Music for Robots created by Frank Allison Coe. The cover featured Ackerman's face superimposed on the robot from the film Tobor the Great. The record was reissued on CD in 2005.

Ackerman appears as a character in The Vampire Affair by David McDaniel (a novel in the Man from U.N.C.L.E. series), and Philip José Farmer's novel Image of the Beast, first published as the short story "Blown" in Screw magazine by Al Goldstein.

A character based on Ackerman and an analog to the Ackermansion appears in the collaborative novel Fallen Angels written jointly by Larry Niven, Jerry Pournelle, and Michael F. Flynn.

"Eccar the Man" is mentioned in The Flying Sorcerers, a novel jointly written by Niven and David Gerrold, which features a number of characters based on notables from the science fiction community.

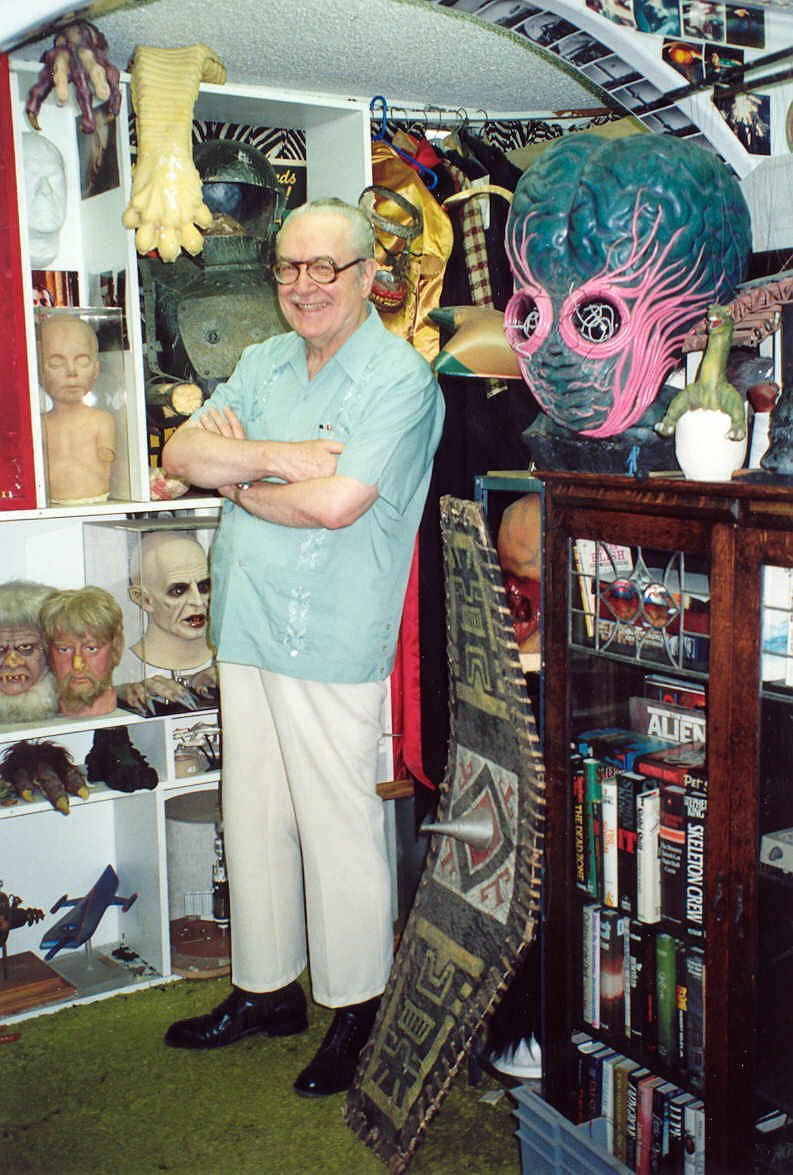
Forrest J Ackerman at the Ackermansion

He appeared on the intro track of Ohio horror punk music group Manimals' 1999 album Horrorcore.

In 2001, Ackerman played the part of an old wax museum caretaker in the camp comedy film The Double-D Avenger directed by William Winckler and starring Russ Meyer luminaries Kitten Natividad, Haji, and Raven De La Croix. Ackerman played a crazy old man who was in love with Kitten Natividad's character, The Double-D Avenger, and his character also talked to the Frankenstein figure and other wax monsters in the museum's chamber of horrors.

Ackerman appeared extensively on-screen discussing his life and the history of science fiction fandom in the 2006 documentary film Finding the Future.

In 2007, Roadhouse Films of Canada released a documentary, Famous Monster: Forrest J Ackerman. The documentary, available on DVD only in the UK, airs regularly on the BRAVO channel.

In the 2012 action film Premium Rush, the character of the corrupt policeman Bobby Monday (played by Michael Shannon) repeatedly uses the alias "Forrest J Ackerman".

In 2013, the science fiction author Jason V Brock released a feature-length documentary about Ackerman called The Ackermonster Chronicles!.

== Personal life ==
Ackerman had one sibling, a younger brother, Alden Lorraine Ackerman (1924–1945), who was killed at the Battle of the Bulge.

Ackerman was married to a German-born teacher and translator, Mathilda Wahrman (1912–1990), whom he met in the early 1950s while she was working in a book store he happened to visit. He eventually dubbed her "Wendayne" or, less formally, "Wendy", by which name she became most generally known within SF and film fandoms, after the character in Peter Pan, his favorite fantasy.

Ackerman was fluent in the international language Esperanto, and claimed to have walked down Hollywood Boulevard arm-in-arm with Leo G. Carroll singing La Espero, the hymn of Esperanto.

Ackerman also received a diploma from Sequoia University, an unaccredited higher education institution in Los Angeles, California, in April 1969, which named him a Fellow of the Sequoia Research Institute.

Ackerman was an atheist at age 15, but did not emphasize that fact in his public life and welcomed people of all faiths, as well as no faith, into his home and personal circle equally.

In 2018, Vincent Price biographer Lucy Chase Williams wrote that Ackerman sexually harassed her and other women over the course of decades despite "written and verbal demands to cease", alleging that he "forced wet kisses" on her, groped her, and mailed her pornography and personal fantasies in which he wanted to "hurt and abuse" her.

== Death ==
In 2003, Ackerman said, "I aim at hitting 100 and becoming the George Burns of science fiction". His health, however, had been failing. He had a major heart attack in 1966 and wore a pacemaker thereafter. He was susceptible to infection in his later life and, after one final trip to the hospital in October 2008, informed his best friend and caregiver Joe Moe that he did not want to go on but hoped to live long enough to vote for Barack Obama in the November 2008 presidential election. Ackerman checked himself out of the hospital and refused further treatment, accepting only a hospice service. Honoring his wishes, his friends assisted him in holding what he delighted in calling "a living funeral". In his final days, he saw everyone he wanted to say goodbye to. Fans were encouraged to send messages of farewell by mail.

While there were several premature reports of his death in the month prior, Ackerman died a minute before midnight on December 4, 2008, at the age of 92. From his "Acker-mini-mansion" in Hollywood, he had entertained and inspired fans weekly with his collection of memorabilia and his stories.

Upon his death, the administration of Ackerman's estate was entrusted to his friend, television producer Kevin Burns. Burns was tasked with the sale and distribution of Mr. Ackerman's extensive collection of Science Fiction and Horror memorabilia. Included in this were Bela Lugosi's ring from Abbott and Costello Meet Frankenstein and Lon Chaney's teeth and top hat from London After Midnight. His personal papers—books, correspondence, fan mail, and more—went to the Special Collections Research Center at Syracuse University.

Ackerman is interred at Forest Lawn Memorial Park (Glendale) with his wife. His plaque simply reads, "Sci-Fi Was My High".

== Legacy ==
On Thursday morning, November 17, 2016, the corner of Franklin and Vermont Avenues, in the heart of the neighborhood "Uncle Forry" lived in for 30 years, was christened Forrest J Ackerman Square.

== Awards ==
- Hugo Awards
  - Number 1 Fan Personality, 1953
  - Retro Hugo for Best Fanzine, 1939 (awarded 2014), for Imagination!
  - Retro Hugo for Best Fanzine, 1946 (awarded 2016) for Voice of the Imagi-Nation
- Horror Hall of Fame Induction Award, 1989 (Forry dubbed the Award, "The Grimmy")
- The Saturn Award for Special Service, 1994 at the 21st Saturn Awards
- Rondo Hatton Classic Horror Awards Inducted to the Monster Kid Hall Of Fame
- Bram Stoker Award for Lifetime Achievement, 1996
- Monster Bash Achievement Award 2007 (Initial winner. The award is dubbed, "The Forry")
- Mangles Skyscraper Award at G-Fest '99 for contributions to the giant monster genre
- World Fantasy Award for Lifetime Achievement, 2002
- Inkpot Award, 1974

== Writing ==
=== Non-fiction ===
- A Reference Guide to American Science Fiction Films
- The Frankenscience Monster, 1969, paperback, Ace Books #25130
- Forrest J Ackerman's Worlds of Science Fiction, Santa Monica, CA: General Publishing Group 1997
- Famous Forry Fotos: Over 70 Years of Ackermemories, 117pp, trade paperback, 2001, Sense of Wonder Press, James A. Rock & Co., Publishers
- Mr. Monster's Movie Gold: A Treasure-Trove Of Imagi-Movies
- Worlds of Tomorrow: The Amazing Universe of Science Fiction Art w/Brad Linaweaver. ISBN 1-888054-93-X. 178pp. 2004 Collectors Press
- Lon of 1000 Faces
- Famous Monster of Filmland #1: An encyclopedia of the first 50 issues
- Famous Monster of Filmland #2: An encyclopedia of issues 50–100
- Metropolis by Thea von Harbou – intro and "stillustration" by FJ Ackerman

=== Anthologies ===
- Rainbow Fantasia: 35 Spectrumatic Tales of Wonder, 559pp., 2001, hardbound and trade paperback, Sense of Wonder Press, James A. Rock & Co., Publishers
- Science Fiction Worlds of Forrest J Ackerman
- Best Science Fiction for 1973
- The Gernsback Awards Vol. 1, 1926
- Gosh! Wow! (Sense of Wonder) Science Fiction
- Reel Futures
- I, Vampire: Interviews with the Undead
- Ackermanthology: Millennium Edition: 65 Astonishing Rediscovered Sci-Fi Shorts, Sense of Wonder Press, James A. Rock & Co., Publishers
- Womanthology, (w/Pam Keesey) 352pp, hardbound and trade paperback, 2003, Sense of Wonder Press, James A. Rock & Co., Publishers
- Martianthology (ed.by Anne Hardin), 266pp, hardbound and trade paperback, 2003, Sense of Wonder Press, James A. Rock & Co., Publishers
- Film Futures
- Expanded Science Fiction Worlds of Forrest J Ackerman and Friends, PLUS, 205pp, hardbound and trade paperback, 2002, Sense of Wonder Press, James A. Rock & Co., Publishers
- Dr. Acula's Thrilling Tales of the Uncanny, xiv+267pp. Trade Paper, Sense of Wonder Press, James A. Rock & Co., Publishers.
- Forrest J Ackerman presents Anthology Of The Living Dead 318pp, trade paperback, 2009, Black Bed Sheets Books, Publishers.

=== Short stories ===
- "Nyusa, Nymph of Darkness"
- "The Shortest Story Ever Told"
- "A Martian Oddity"
- "Earth's Lucky Day"
- "The Record"
- "Micro Man"
- "Dhactwhu!-Remember?"
- "Kiki"
- "The Mute Question"
- "Atoms and Stars"
- "The Lady Takes a Powder"
- "Sabina of the White Cylinder"
- "What an Idea!"
- "Death Rides the Spaceways"
- "Dwellers in the Dust"
- "Burn Witch, Burn"
- "Yvala"
- "The Girl Who Wasn't There"
- "Count Down to Doom"
- "Time to Change"
- "And Then the Cover Was Bare"
- "The Atomic Monument"
- "Letter to an Angel"
- "The Man Who Was Thirsty"
- "The Radclyffe Effect"
- "Cosmic Report Card: Earth"
- "Great Gog's Grave"
- "The Naughty Venuzian"

== Additional biographies ==
- Forrest J Ackerman at IMDb
- Forrest J. Ackerman at the Internet Speculative Fiction Database
- "SFWA Obituary". Archived from the original on February 4, 2009.
- 4e's Foyer: biography
- SFSite: Gary Westfahl's Biographical Encyclopedia
- Article on Ackerman's persona and life
