= The Double-D Avenger =

2001 film by William Winckler

- Directed by: William Winckler
- Written by: William Winckler
- Produced by: William Winckler Productions
- Starring: Tura Satana; Haji; Raven De La Croix; Forrest J. Ackerman
- Cinematography: Raoul J. Germain Jr.
- Edited by: Raoul J. Germain Jr. Jay Dee Witney
- Music by: Ron Shore
- Distributed by: Bio-Tide Films (2006) (Japan) (theatrical); Elite Entertainment (2003) (USA) (DVD); King Records (2006) (Japan) (DVD); William Winckler Productions (all media)
- Release dates: November 17, 2001 (USA); February 11, 2006 (Japan)
- Running time: 77 minutes
- Country: United States
- Language: English

The Double-D Avenger is a 2001 American comedy film by William Winckler.

This film, first released in fall 2001, written, produced and directed by cult filmmaker William Winckler, is a campy spoof of "Wonder Woman" about a costumed superwoman who uses her extremely large breasts to fight crime.

It is of interest to cult movie fans since it is the only "reunion film" of Russ Meyer's famous actresses Kitten Natividad (Beneath the Valley of the Ultra-Vixens), Haji Faster Pussycat! Kill! Kill!) and Raven De La Croix.

== Plot summary ==
The story focuses on big busty Chastity Knott (Natividad) who must use her new amazing abilities as the super-stacked costumed crime fighter, The Double-D Avenger, to stop villainous bikini bar owner Al Purplewood (G. Larry Butler) and his sexy, murderous strippers. The movie has much live-action comic-book action, sexual innuendo, Russ Meyer-inspired camera angles focusing on the female character's breasts, and other "off color" verbal and visual gags. Remarkably, there is no nudity in the picture.

== Reviews ==
Variety critic Dennis Harvey gave the film a very positive review noting its "a cheerfully silly ode to larger-than-life femininity."

== Releases ==
The fun film runs 77 minutes, in color, and is suggested for audiences over 18. It has been a success in the U.S. theatrically and on video and DVD, and is also a hit internationally, with a French-language version in France ("Double D Avenger Les Appas De La Justiciere") and a Japanese-language version in Japan ("The Double-D Avenger / MegaPie Oba Ranger"). A second DVD version was released by Elite Entertainment, titled "Joe Bob Briggs Presents The Double-D Avenger," which features audio commentary by famous drive-in movie critic Joe Bob Briggs. A special DVD two-pack has lalso been released by Elite, "A Double Dose of Joe Bob Briggs," featuring the Joe Bob commentary version of "The Double-D Avenger" packaged with Joe Bob's commentary on "Jesse James Meets Frankenstein's Daughter."

== Cast ==
- Kitten Natividad as Chastity Knott
- Haji as Hydra Heffer
- Raven De La Croix as Dr. De La Croix
- G. Larry Butler as Al Purplewood
- William Winckler as Cousin Billy (credited as Bill Winckler)
- Forrest J. Ackerman as Museum Caretaker
- Bob Mackey as Sheriff
- Mimma Mariucci as Pirate Juggs
- Sheri Dawn Thomas as Ooga Boobies
- Lunden De'Leon as Ta-Ta Leader Orbs
- Gary Canavello as Bubba
- Andrea Ana Persun as Adolfina Hitbrakes
- Logan LaBrent as Lingere Woman #1
- Elizabeth Starr as Lingerie Woman #2
- Sandra Dease as Lingerie Woman #3
