= Kitten Natividad =

Mexican-American actress, exotic dancer and porn star (1948–2022)

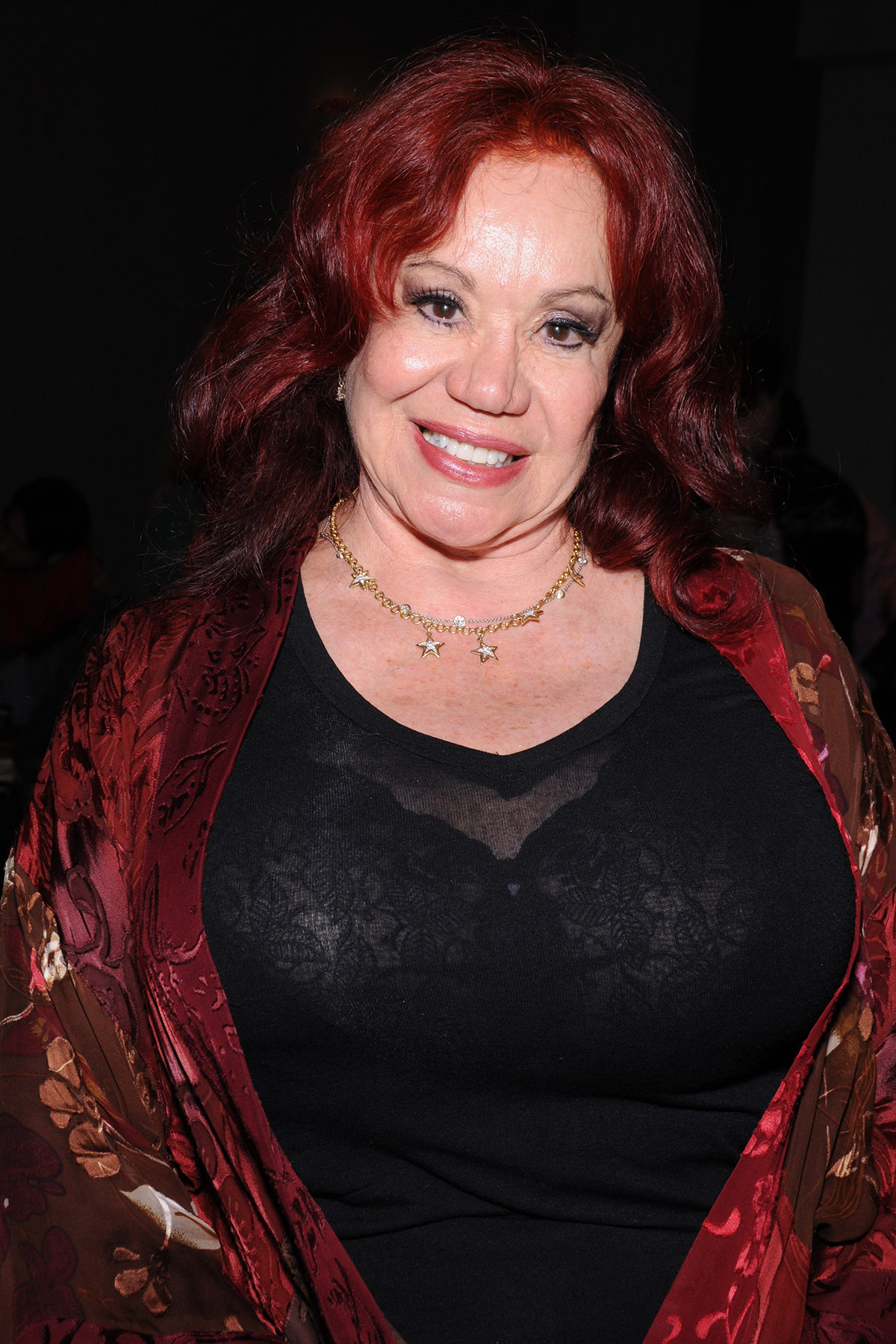
- Natividad in 2014
- Born: Francesca Isabel Natividad; February 13, 1948; Ciudad Juárez, Chihuahua, Mexico
- Died: September 24, 2022 (aged 74); Los Angeles, California, U.S.
- Other names: Francesca 'Kitten' Natividad; Francesca Natividad; Frances Natividad
- Occupations: Film actress; exotic dancer
- Height: 5 ft 4 in (1.63 m)
- Partner: Russ Meyer (1964– 1979)

Francesca Isabel Natividad (February 13, 1948 – September 24, 2022), known professionally as Kitten Natividad, was a Mexican-American film actress and exotic dancer. She was noted for her 44-inch (112 cm) bust, and appearances in cult films made by her ex-partner, director Russ Meyer.

== Early years ==
Natividad was born on February 13, 1948, in Ciudad Juárez, Chihuahua State, Mexico. She was the eldest of nine children. Natividad did not speak English until she was 10 years old. At that time, her mother married a U.S. citizen and they moved to Texas. Natividad attended Ysleta High School in El Paso, where she was her senior class president.

After moving to California, Natividad worked as both a maid and a cook for Stella Stevens, and then as a key-punch operator for IBM, before eventually turning to go-go dancing to make ends meet. At this time, she adopted the stage name of "Kitten" Natividad, which came from her shyness. In 1969, at the age of 21 years, she had her first breast implant surgery in Tijuana (where it was legal) on the advice of her agent.

== Career ==
Natividad, by then known mainly as Kitten, was introduced to Russ Meyer by fellow dancer Shari Eubank, a performer in Meyer's 1975 film Supervixens. Meyer hired her to narrate his movie Up! In it, she was shown sitting nude in a tree, quoting the poetry of H.D., and acting as a Greek chorus to the nonsensical action. Meyer was so impressed he wanted her to star in his next feature, Beneath the Valley of the Ultra-Vixens, one of several collaborations between Meyer and film critic Roger Ebert. Meyer paid for a second breast enhancement and voice lessons to eliminate her accent. She left her husband for Meyer during the filming, and they lived together as a couple for most of the next 15 years.

After this, Natividad moved into pornographic modeling, mainly doing glamour or girl-girl shoots with the likes of Candy Samples, Uschi Digard, and Patty Plenty. The appearances increased her dancing income many times over. She incorporated a giant champagne glass into her act, similar to such as Lili St. Cyr had used, accompanied by the Bobby Darin hit "Splish Splash". She appeared as a guest on The Dating Game, one of a number of game shows that Chuck Barris produced.

During the 1980s, Natividad began appearing in pornographic productions, initially limiting her performances to appearing topless. Eventually, however, she graduated to engaging in hardcore performances, usually with younger men and women. She has received criticism from burlesque performers for appearing in hardcore videos. She also founded the private photo and video studio called "The Kitten Klub". Her website later closed. She famously appeared as a stripper at the bachelor party held by Sean Penn to celebrate his 1985 marriage to Madonna, having portrayed a stripper the year before in The Wild Life, a movie starring Sean's brother Christopher.

In 2001, Natividad starred in the cult film comedy The Double-D Avenger, directed by William Winckler, and in it, she was reunited with fellow Russ Meyer "repertory" stars Haji (from Meyer's Faster Pussycat! Kill! Kill!) and Raven De La Croix from Meyer's film Up!. In The Double-D Avenger, Kitten Natividad played Chastity Knott, a woman who becomes a busty costumed crime fighter.

=== In pop culture ===
- Natividad appeared on The Gong Show in the late 1970s and on The $1.98 Beauty Show, both of which, like The Dating Game, were produced by Chuck Barris. (Barris hosted The Gong Show; Rip Taylor hosted The $1.98 Beauty Show; and Jim Lange hosted The Dating Game.)
- She appeared in a 1980s music video for Mitch Ryder's version of the song "When You Were Mine", which was written and composed by Prince.
- In August 2006, Natividad appeared in a Playboy layout, "The History of Bikinis".

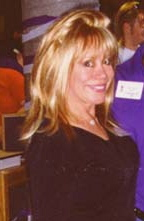
Natividad in 2000

== Personal life ==
Natividad and Meyer never married, but they lived together for 15 years.

In October 1999, Natividad underwent double-mastectomy surgery for treatment of breast cancer. After her breasts were removed, it was discovered that the silicone used in the implants during her 1969 breast enlargement surgery was of industrial grade rather than surgical grade. She subsequently underwent reconstructive surgery, bringing her breasts close to the size they were prior to the mastectomy.

As of early August 2016, she was living alone with a pit bull and three cats, all of which were featured in the 2005 documentary movie Pornstar Pets, and she continued to support herself with sales of her porn videos and phone sex. She appeared in the Adam Rifkin independent feature A Night at the Golden Eagle; according to her, Rifkin remembered recognizing her when their cars were both stopped at the same stoplight 25 years earlier.

== Death ==
Natividad died from kidney failure at Cedars Sinai Hospital in Los Angeles on September 24, 2022, aged 74. She was survived by her sister Eva, her mother, four nephews and a niece.

== Selected filmography ==
Kitten Natividad has appeared in more than 65 films and video productions. Career highlights and major studio features include:

- 1972: The New Centurions as Go-Go Dancer In Bar (uncredited)
- 1976: Up! as The Greek Chorus
- 1979: Beneath the Valley of the Ultra-Vixens as Lola Langusta
- 1976: Deep Jaws
- 1980: Airplane! as Bouncy Topless Woman On Plane (uncredited)
- 1982: Airplane II: The Sequel as Woman In 'Moral Majority' Shirt (uncredited)
- 1982: The Best Little Whorehouse in Texas (uncredited)
- 1983: My Tutor as Ana Maria
- 1983: Bodacious Ta Tas as Kitten
- 1984: Night Patrol as "Big Bust"
- 1984: The Wild Life as Stripper #2
- 1985: Takin' It Off as Betty "Big Ones"
- 1985: An Evening with Kitten
- 1986: The Tomb as Stripper
- 1987: Takin' It All Off as Betty "Big Ones"
- 1990: Another 48 Hrs. as Girl In Movie
- 1991: 40 The Hard Way as Wife 3
- 1993: Titillation 3 as Ma Barker
- 1993: Buford's Beach Bunnies as Madam #1
- 1996: United Trash
- 1997: The 120 Days of Bottrop
- 2001: The Double-D Avenger as Chastity Knott
- 2001: Night at the Golden Eagle as Ruby
- 2009: Nightbeats as Lola
- 2017: Fags in the Fast Lane as Kitten
