= Haji (actress) =

Canadian actress (1946–2013)

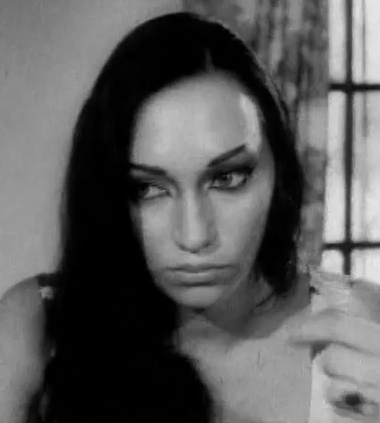
- Haji in Faster, Pussycat! Kill! Kill!, 1965
- Born: Barbarella Catton; January 24, 1946; Quebec, Canada
- Died: August 9, 2013 (aged 67); Oxnard, California, U.S.
- Resting place: Santa Barbara Cemetery
- Other names: Barbarella; Haji Cat; Haji Catton; Hadji; Hadji Catton
- Occupation: Actress
- Years active: 1965–2003
- Children: 1

Haji (born Barbarella Catton; January 24, 1946 – August 9, 2013) was a Canadian-born actress of British and Filipino descent, and a former exotic dancer known for her role in Russ Meyer's 1965 cult classic Faster, Pussycat! Kill! Kill! She made significant contributions to her roles by introducing elements of psychedelia and witchcraft as well as writing most of her own dialogue.

== Life and career ==
Born in Quebec, Canada, Haji—a nickname given to her by an uncle—appeared in several Russ Meyer films, including Motorpsycho (1965), Faster, Pussycat! Kill! Kill! (1965), Good Morning and... Goodbye! (1967), and Supervixens (1975). Haji's final role was as Moonji in Killer Drag Queens on Dope (2003).

Haji was reunited with fellow Russ Meyer film stars Kitten Natividad and Raven De La Croix in the 2001 comedy feature film The Double-D Avenger, directed by William Winckler. In it, Haji played evil exotic dancer Hydra Heffer.

Haji was featured as one of the top 1,000 most glamorous women of the 20th century in the book Glamorous Girls of the Century by Steve Sullivan. She was also interviewed in the book Invasion of the B-Girls by Jewel Shepard. Haji lived in Malibu, California.

Haji died in Oxnard, California, at the age of 67. Never married, she had one daughter.

== Selected filmography ==
- Motorpsycho (1965)
- Faster, Pussycat! Kill! Kill! (1965)
- Good Morning and... Goodbye! (1967)
- Beyond the Valley of the Dolls (1970)
- Supervixens (1975)
- The Killing of a Chinese Bookie (1976)
