= Mark Pirro (director) =

American filmmaker

- Born: July 1956 (age 69–70); Batavia, New York, U.S.
- Occupations: Film director, writer, editor
- Employer: Pirromount Pictures
- Known for: A Polish Vampire in Burbank (1983)

Mark Pirro (born July 1956) is an American director, writer, and editor. After making A Polish Vampire in Burbank (1983) for just $2,500 and seeing it gross more than half a million dollars in sales, Pirro became a major figure in independent cinema. Having written and begun directing the film himself, he would also star in it following the departure from the production of Grease star Eddie Deezen.

Pirro went on to direct such films as Deathrow Gameshow (1987), Curse of the Queerwolf (1988), Nudist Colony of the Dead (1991), and Buford's Beach Bunnies (1993), the lattermost of which was the film debut of Jim Hanks. He also wrote My Mom's a Werewolf for Crown International Pictures.

A documentary about Pirro's life and career, Hollywood on a Shoestring, premiered at the Raindance Film Festival in London in 2023.

== Filmography ==
Year	Title	Role	Notes
1978	Buns	Director / Writer	Short film
1979	The Spy Who Did It Better	Director / Writer	Short film
1983	A Polish Vampire in Burbank	Director / Writer / Editor	Stars as Dupah
1987	Deathrow Gameshow	Director / Writer	
1988	Curse of the Queerwolf	Director / Writer / Editor	
1988	My Mom's a Werewolf	Writer	
1991	Nudist Colony of the Dead	Director / Writer	
1993	Buford's Beach Bunnies	Director / Writer / Editor	
1997	An Early Grave	Director / Writer	TV movie
1998	Color-Blinded	Director / Writer / Editor	
2000	Serena's Stir	Editor	
2001	Polish Vampire: Behind the Fangs	Director	
2003	Rectuma	Director / Writer / Editor	
2005	Flaw & Order	Editor	
2009	The God Complex	Director / Writer / Editor	
2011	Chutzpah!	Editor	
2014	The Rage of Innocence	Director / Writer / Editor	
2017	Mountain Grrrl	Director / Editor	Music video
2018	Celluloid Soul	Director / Writer	
2018	Millennials of the Blind	Editor	
2018	Speaking Through the Silence	Editor	
2021	The Deceased Won't Desist!	Director / Writer / Editor	
