= Buford's Beach Bunnies =

1993 film by Mark Pirro

- Film poster
- Directed by: Mark Pirro
- Written by: Alan Gries; Mark Pirro; Robyn Sullivent
- Produced by: Andrew W. Garroni
- Starring: Jim Hanks
- Cinematography: Michael G. Wojciechowski
- Edited by: Alex Mackie
- Music by: Gregg Gross
- Production company: Axis Films International
- Release date: June 2, 1993
- Country: United States
- Language: English

Buford's Beach Bunnies is a 1993 American comedy film, starring Jim Hanks in his film debut.

== Plot ==
Jeeter Buford is the son of fast-food tycoon Harry Buford. Jeeter will inherit his father's company only if he can overcome his lifelong fear of women. When Harry offers $100,000 to the first of his female employees who can woo his son, the competition begins.

== Cast ==
- Jim Hanks as Jeeter Buford
  - Henry Capanna as Young Jeeter Buford
- Rikki Brando as Lauren Beatty
- Monique Parent as Amber Dexterous
- Dave Robinson as The Amazing Foreskin / Santa Claus
- Charley Rossman as Scud Blackplowman
- Suzanne Ager as Boopsie Underall
- Barrett Cooper as Harry Buford
- Ina Rogers as Beula Lugosi
- Jerry Rector as Karl
- Robyn Blythe as Dr. Van Horney
- Bettina Brancato as Miss Chester
- David Damien as Manuel
- Aaron Atinsky as Billy
- John Callan as Peter
- Steven Faupel as Bud
- Tony Gaetano as Bogart
- Stephanie Anderson as Marilyn
- Jefferson Wagner as Clint
- Lisa Fernandez as Miss Heatley
- Avery Waisbren as Sergeant Pepper
- Richard Derby Attwill as Judge Rhinehole
- Richard Cerenko as Ambrose Chaser
- Jonathan Fahn as Prosecutor
- Kitten Natividad as Madam #1
- Linda Honeyman as Madam #2
- Diane Fornier as Prostitute
- Avalon Anders as Santa's Helper
- Lissa Walters as Porn Actress
- Mark Pirro as Porn Actor
