= The Big Circus =

1959 film

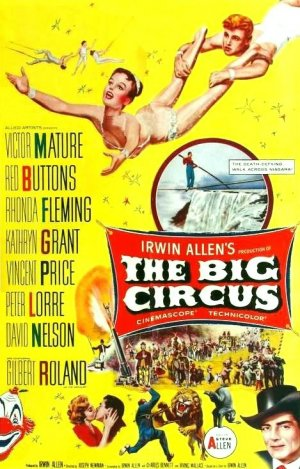
- Theatrical release poster
- Directed by: Joseph M. Newman
- Screenplay by: Irwin Allen; Charles Bennett; Irving Wallace
- Story by: Irwin Allen
- Produced by: Irwin Allen
- Starring: Victor Mature; Red Buttons; Rhonda Fleming; Kathryn Grant; Vincent Price; Peter Lorre; David Nelson; Gilbert Roland
- Cinematography: Winton Hoch
- Edited by: Adrienne Fazan
- Music by: Paul Sawtell; Bert Shefter
- Production company: Saratoga Productions
- Distributed by: Allied Artists Pictures
- Release date: July 5, 1959
- Running time: 108–109 minutes
- Country: United States
- Language: English
- Budget: $2 million
- Box office: $2.7 million (est. US/ Canada rentals)

The Big Circus is a 1959 American drama film directed by Joseph M. Newman and starring Victor Mature as a circus owner struggling with financial trouble and a murderous unknown saboteur. It was produced and cowritten by Irwin Allen, later known for a series of big-budget disaster films.

== Plot ==
After splitting from his partnership with the Borman Brothers, Hank Whirling needs money to keep his Whirling Circus operational now that it must compete with the Bormans. He receives a bank loan but only on the condition he take along accountant Randy Sherman and publicist Helen Harrison to help the circus turn a profit.

Hank's top act is the Colino trapeze troupe, featuring Zach Colino, his wife Maria and newcomer Tommy Gordon. The circus also features ringmaster Hans and boss clown Skeeter. Unbeknownst to Hank, his sister Jeannie wishes to be a trapeze artist as their late mother was, and has been secretly training with the Flying Colinos.

At a press party, a lion is let loose, terrifying the VIPs in attendance until Hank captures it with the help of Colino. Helen accuses him of staging the incident for publicity. They soon discover that the cage had been deliberately opened by a corrupt animal trainer named Slade, who is found, captured and eventually jailed.

When Skeeter gets drunk and is unable to perform his act, Randy substitutes, making numerous mistakes that actually made the act funnier. His stepping in earns him acceptance from the clowns and other circus performers.

Helen and Randy are infuriated by Whirling's refusal to accept their help. Hank believes that he is a good publicist and does not need Helen. After Randy fires 40 roustabouts and replaces them with machines for raising the tent and driving the tent stakes, Hank argues with him. The stake driver is sabotaged and sets a pile of hay next to the Big Top on fire, but Hank prevents the tent from burning. Hank, Helen and Randy wonder if a saboteur, perhaps hired by the Bormans, is traveling with the show.

When the first section of the circus train derails, Maria Colino is killed, leaving her husband heartbroken and unable to perform. Attendance suffers because of a long stretch of foul weather, and the books are looking grim with the show's headlining act unavailable.

Hank conceives a bold scheme. He will scrap the existing route, perform one show in Buffalo, and then slip into New York City three weeks before the Bormans' circus, stealing the audience from his rivals. But first, he must create a major publicity splash. Helen proposes a stunt last performed in the 19th century: a walk across the gorge at Niagara Falls on a tightrope. As Zach has lost his confidence following his wife's death, Hank goads him into performing the stunt by calling him a coward. Zach swears he will kill Hank after walking the Falls, but after completing the walk, Zach realizes that Hank had been trying to help him and the friends reconcile.

With the bank about to foreclose on his circus, Hank approaches television star Steve Allen to seek publicity. Allen purchases the rights to broadcast the opening-night performance in New York for enough money to pay the show's line of credit and enable it to survive. Detectives come looking for Tommy and inform the show's management that he is an escaped lunatic. Hank realizes that Tommy is the saboteur.

Jeannie's debut with the Flying Colinos nearly ends in disaster when Tommy deliberately misses catching her, but she manages to grasp a climbing rope and save herself. While fleeing from Zach, Tommy falls to his death.

With the circus now profitable and the saboteur dead, Hank and Helen realize that they are in love. They kiss passionately aboard a spec float as the movie closes.

== Cast ==
- Victor Mature as Henry Jasper "Hank" Whirling
- Red Buttons as Randy Sherman
- Rhonda Fleming as Helen Harrison
- Kathryn Grant as Jeannie Whirling
- Vincent Price as Hans Hagenfeld
- Gilbert Roland as Zach Colino
- David Nelson as Tommy Gordon
- Adele Mara as Maria 'Mama' Colino
- Howard McNear as Mr. Lomax
- Charles Watts as Jonathan
- Peter Lorre as Skeeter
- Steve Allen as himself

== Production ==
Irwin Allen announced the film in 1957. He intended to produce and direct the film for Columbia and planned to have parts for 40 stars, in a similar manner to the way he had produced and directed The Story of Mankind. The project would eventually be undertaken by Allied Artists. It was one of Allied's most expensive movies at that date with a budget of $2 million.

Filming began in January 1959 at the MGM studios. Allen was interested in making "an exciting colorful show—something the public can't see on television."

Charles Bennett had written for Allen several times. He was called in to work on the script by Allen claiming the latter was "in a horrible mess with this guy, who is the greatest, bloody, successful ham writer in the world—Irving Wallace. Their script was awful. It had reached the stage that Columbia had told Irwin to get the hell out. They had $90,000 in it." —which wasn’t very much in those days, let’s face it. But they had said, “We’re not interested anymore.” Bennett said he "straightened it [the script] out in a couple of weeks; I was always good at that sort of thing. Then I wrote the screenplay, which of course he naturally had to take credit on, which he didn’t deserve."

Famed circus performer Barbette served on the film as a consultant.

== Reception ==
=== Critical reception ===
Variety called it "a rousingly lavish film, stocked with tinted elephants, snarling lions and three rings of handsome production. While at times it looks too much like Hollywood's view of the big top, rather than reality, it is shrewdly calculated to satisfy the peanut-and-sawdust yen of the millions to whom circus-going is a less frequently available diversion than in past generations."

Writing in The New York Times, film critic Bosley Crowther warned readers to "be prepared for the beating you are going to have to endure when you take the kids to see Irwin Allen's 'The Big Circus'", noted the film's "riotous clichés," that Allen "was more concerned about a quantity of clichés than he was about quality," and that director Newman "wasn't concerned about anything except getting the picture finished, which must have been quite a chore."

A review of the film on Turner Classic Movies described it as "an eclectic assortment of stars mixing with genuine circus performers at the service of a muddled story of overlapping personal dramas," and noted that contemporaneous reviews described the film as "an awkward all-star melodrama, full of color, hokum and clichés and about as nutritious as fresh-spun cotton candy."

=== Box office ===
According to Kinematograph Weekly the film performed "better than average" at the British box office in 1959.

Variety reported the film "turned a nice profit".

Rhoda Fleming's fee for the film was $40,000 but she was entitled to a bonus if the film made more than $5 million. In January 1964 he was given a bonus of $10,000 although she had to threaten to go to court to get it.

== Comic book adaptation ==
A comic book adaptation of the film, Dell Four Color #1036, was released in August 1959.

== See also ==
- List of American films of 1959
- The Greatest Show on Earth - 1952 Academy Award for Best Picture winner similar in content
