= Nudist Colony of the Dead =

- VHS video cassette cover
- Written by: Mark Pirro
- Produced by: Mark Pirro
- Starring: Deborah Stern; Tony Cicchetti; Rachel Latt; Braddon Mendelson; Jim Bruce; Barbara Dow; Heather McPherson; Peter Napoles; Steve Wilcox; Juan Tanamera; Forrest J. Ackerman; Dave Robinson
- Music by: Gregg Gross; Mark Pirro; Joyce Mordoh
- Distributed by: Artistic License Video
- Release date: 1991
- Running time: 90 minutes
- Country: United States
- Language: English
- Budget: $35,000

Nudist Colony of the Dead is a 1991 horror comedy musical film written and directed by Mark Pirro (who has also worked under the names Marky Dolittle and Marky Elfman). The film was shot on Super-8 film and produced on a budget of $35,000.

In the film, a group of nudists is forced off their land by religious zealots, and then commits mass suicide. Five years later, the nudists rise from the grave and seek revenge against the religious bigots.

== Storyline ==
"Sunny Buttocks Nudist Colony" is shut down by Judge Rhinehole and his band of religious zealots for offending the local community. The nudists decide to protest by entering into a suicide pact, vowing to return one day to terrorize the people who took over their land.

Five years later, a bunch of kids are sent to the ex-nudist colony, which has now been transformed into a religious retreat. True to their promise, the nudist corpses rise from the grave, seek revenge on the zealots who condemned them, and sing big production numbers as the campers begin to experience an attrition problem.

== Cast ==
- Deborah Stern as Shelly Mammarosa
- Tony Cicchetti as Art Shoe
- Rachel Latt as Mrs. Druple
- Braddon Mendelson as Peter Trickle
- Jim Bruce as Billy McRighteous
- Barbara Dow as Mrs. Mammarosa
- Heather McPherson as Fanny Wype
- Peter Napoles as Juan Tu
- Steve Wilcox as Lou Jobee
- Juan Tanamera as Gus Unteide
- Forrest J. Ackerman as Judge Rhinehole
- Dave Robinson as Reverend Ritz

== Production ==
Nudist Colony of the Dead was shot in Sacramento, California.

== Reception ==
Writing in The Zombie Movie Encyclopedia, academic Peter Dendle said, "[T]his amateur summer-camp slasher spoof isn't as wacky as it thinks it is".
