= Curse of the Queerwolf =

- 1990 VHS release
- Directed by: Mark Pirro
- Written by: Mark Pirro
- Produced by: Sergio Bandera; Mark Pirro; Brian J. Smith
- Starring: Michael Palazzolo; Kent Butler; Taylor Whitney
- Edited by: Mark Pirro
- Music by: Gregg Gross
- Production company: Pirromount Pictures
- Release date: 1988
- Running time: 90 minutes
- Country: United States
- Language: English
- Budget: $10,000 (estimated)

Curse of the Queerwolf is a 1988 comedy horror film directed by Mark Pirro. Michael Palazzolo and Kent Butler starred in the film.

== Plot ==
Larry meets someone he believes to be a woman, but is actually a transvestite, who turns him into a dickanthrope, or "queerwolf" by biting him on the buttocks. A group of people who are members of a religious cult hunting the queerwolf discover the transvestite at Larry's apartment, and they also warn him about a curse. They later kill the original queerwolf with the only weapon known to kill a dickanthrope, a silver dildo.

A gypsy offers to help him, but Larry refuses until the first full moon that he experiences. After his transformation, waking up sore in a sauna, he goes to her, and she tells him that he only way for him to combat the transformation is to wear a medallion with a picture of John Wayne. The medallion is successful at preventing transformation.

In the following night, Larry takes his girlfriend to dinner at a fancy restaurant to celebrate. The queerwolf hunters make an appearance at the restaurant, where they level an accusation at Larry of being a dickanthrope. Confident in the powers of the John Wayne medallion, Larry denies their accusations and steps out into the moonlight to demonstrate.

As they are being seated, a group of men with guns attempt to rob the restaurant. Larry remembers that he is invulnerable to every weapon but one, and single-handedly foils the robbery. In the process, however, his medallion is broken and falls off, and Larry transforms in full view of the hunters, who attempt to seize him. He bites several men, who immediately transform, and they hold him down for a "fagxorcism", in which the head priest sprinkles beer on him and shows him pictures of "macho" icons like Burt Reynolds and Mr T. He responds by throwing up pink soup. The fagxorcism is successful, and Larry is able to resume his normal life.

However, in the closing credits, it is revealed (audio only) that Larry is arrested, tried, and convicted for accidentally running over the Gypsy woman, and spends the rest of his life in prison.

== Cast ==
- Michael Palazzolo as Larry Smalbut
- Kent Butler as Richard Cheese
- Taylor Whitney as Lois Gerstel
- Cynthia Brownell as Paula McFarland
- Darwyn Carson as Holly
- Jim Bruce as Mr. McFarland
- Sergio Bandera as Priest
- Mark Pirro as Torchman
- Rodney Trappe as Torchman
- John McCafferty as Mountain Man
- Pat Hunter as Mountain Man
- Timothy Ralston as Mountain Man
- Susan Cherones as Mrs. Thyroid
- Conrad Brooks as Wally Beaver
- Forrest J Ackerman as Mr. Richardson
- Alfie Pearl as Detective Morose
- Hugh O. Fields as Fagxorcist
- Mike Margy as Custodian
- Cheryl Butler as Gina
- Natalia Gvozdic as Dancer
- Don Martin as TV Newscaster

== Production ==
The film was produced in Santa Barbara, California with 8mm film, which is the type of film that was used by many very low-budget directors in the late 1980s.

The queerwolf first made an appearance in the director's film A Polish Vampire in Burbank, but it was not in the film for long. Stereotypes of homosexuals are parodied, along with horror conventions.

== Reception ==
Author David Bleiler wrote in his book TLA Video & DVD Guide 2005 that "while offensive to some, [the film] is more harmless camp than incendiary hatred". A Rovi review said, "Tasteless and raunchy, the film will offend many, but those looking for a sick, offbeat comedy will enjoy Pirro's irreverence."

Adam Tyner, writing for DVD Talk, said, "Anyway, even though I do see Curse of the Queerwolf as superior in a number of ways, for whatever reason, I didn't find it particularly funny. That's not to say there aren't funny parts."

== Home media ==
The film had a VHS release in 1994, distributed by Artemis Entertainment. It had a 2003 DVD release with two special features, the documentary Completely From Behind and a commentary. The DVD was distributed by MTI Home Video.
