= Paul Sawtell =

Polish-American film score composer (1906–1971)

- Born: Paul Sawatzki; February 3, 1906; Geluwe, German Reich
- Died: August 1, 1971 (aged 65); Los Angeles, California
- Occupation: Composer

Paul Sawtell (February 3, 1906 – August 1, 1971) was a film score composer.

== Biography ==
Sawtell was born Paul Sawatzki in the village of Geluwe, in the German Reich (now Poland).

Sawtell began his career with RKO, and eventually joined Universal Pictures. Sawtell worked on many western and horror films, and also scored the Sherlock Holmes films The Pearl of Death and The Scarlet Claw. In the late 1940s, Sawtell returned to RKO. He also worked for various independent producers, including Eagle-Lion Films' production of T-Men (1947). He also composed and arranged the uncredited music for the Venice, Italy sequences in This is Cinerama (1952).

In the late 1950s, Sawtell struck up an alliance with fellow film composer Bert Shefter and they produced many film scores together, including those of classic science fiction and horror films such as Kronos, It! The Terror from Beyond Space, Return of the Fly, The Lost World, Voyage to the Bottom of the Sea (in cooperation with producer Irwin Allen), and Jack the Giant Killer in 1962. In 1965 they composed some scores for the director Russ Meyer, such as the cult classic Faster Pussycat! Kill! Kill! and Motorpsycho. The last score they provided was for the Mexican film Emiliano Zapata in 1970 shortly before Sawtell's death. Perhaps Sawtell's best-known composition is the main theme for the Voyage to the Bottom of the Sea TV series, adapted from Allen's 1961 feature film, for which Sawtell had written a different theme. He also wrote music for A Date with Judy, a 1940s radio sit-com.

== Personal life and death ==
Sawtell died on August 1, 1971, at the age of 65. He is buried at Glendale, California's Forest Lawn Memorial Park Cemetery.

Sawtell had a home near Demuth Park in Palm Springs, California.

== Partial filmography ==
- The Pearl of Death (1944)
- The Scarlet Claw (1944)
- The Falcon in San Francisco (1945)
- Snafu (1945)
- Girl on the Spot (1946)
- The Fighting Guardsman (1946)
- Tarzan and the Leopard Woman (1946)
- Perilous Holiday (1946)
- Renegades (1946)
- Sunset Pass (1946)
- Step by Step (1946)
- Criminal Court (1946)
- Trail Street (1947)
- The Devil Thumbs a Ride (1947)
- Tarzan and the Huntress (1947)
- Born to Kill (1947)
- Dick Tracy's Dilemma (1947)
- Desperate (1947)
- Keeper of the Bees (1947)
- Dick Tracy Meets Gruesome (1947)
- For You I Die (1947)
- T-Men (1947)
- The Black Arrow (1948)
- River Lady (1948)
- Raw Deal (1948)
- Return of the Bad Men (1948)
- Northwest Stampede (1948)
- Four Faces West (1948)
- Mystery in Mexico (1948)
- Walk a Crooked Mile (1948)
- Bodyguard (1948)
- Bad Boy (1949)
- The Clay Pigeon (1949)
- The Big Cat (1949)
- The Doolins of Oklahoma (1949)
- Black Magic (1949)
- Fighting Man of the Plains (1949)
- The Threat (1949)
- Davy Crockett, Indian Scout (1950)
- Fortunes of Captain Blood (1950)
- Tarzan and the Slave Girl (1950)
- The Cariboo Trail (1950)
- Bunco Squad (1950)
- Outrage (1950)
- Southside 1-1000 (1950)
- Hunt the Man Down (1950)
- Stage to Tucson (1950)
- Rogue River (1951)
- The Great Missouri Raid (1951)
- Santa Fe (1951)
- Best of the Badmen (1951)
- Warpath (1951)
- Roadblock (1951)
- The Whip Hand (1951)
- Fort Defiance (1951)
- The Son of Dr. Jekyll (1951)
- Silver City (1951)
- Flaming Feather (1952)
- Tarzan's Savage Fury (1952)
- The Half-Breed (1952)
- Denver and Rio Grande (1952)
- The Savage (1952)
- Hurricane Smith (1952)
- Kansas City Confidential (1952)
- Sky Full of Moon (1952)
- Raiders of the Seven Seas (1953)
- Pony Express (1953)
- Tarzan and the She-Devil (1953)
- Arrowhead (1953)
- Inferno (1953)
- Half a Hero (1953)
- Flight to Tangier (1953)
- The Diamond Queen (1953)
- Captain Kidd and the Slave Girl (1954)
- Return to Treasure Island (1954)
- Down Three Dark Streets (1954)
- Three Hours to Kill (1954)
- They Rode West (1954)
- Ten Wanted Men (1955)
- Tarzan's Hidden Jungle (1955)
- Rage at Dawn (1955)
- The Marauders (1955)
- Tall Man Riding (1955)
- A Lawless Street (1955)
- Texas Lady (1955)
- Last of the Badmen (1957)
- Pawnee (1957)
- Hell Ship Mutiny (1957)
- The Black Scorpion (1957)
- The Story of Mankind (1957)
- Kronos (1957)
- Stopover Tokyo (1957)
- Ambush at Cimarron Pass (1958)
- It! The Terror from Beyond Space (1958)
- The Fly (1958)
- Return of the Fly (1959)
- The Cosmic Man (1959)
- The Big Circus (1959)
- The Sad Horse (1959)
- The_Walking_Target (1960)
- The Lost World (1960)
- The Big Show (1961)
- Voyage to the Bottom of the Sea (1961)
- Pirates of Tortuga (1961)
- Jack the Giant Killer (1962)
- Five Weeks in a Balloon (1962)
- The Last Man on Earth (1964)
- Island of the Blue Dolphins (1964)
- Faster Pussycat! Kill! Kill! (1965)
- Motorpsycho (1965)
- Emiliano Zapata (1970)
- The Gatling Gun (1971)
