= A Polish Vampire in Burbank =

- Directed by: Mark Pirro
- Written by: Mark Pirro
- Produced by: Mark Pirro
- Cinematography: Craig Bassuk
- Edited by: Mark Pirro
- Music by: Sergio Bandera; Gregg Gross
- Release date: October 31, 1983 (Los Angeles)
- Running time: 80 minutes
- Country: United States
- Language: English
- Budget: $2,500
- Box office: $500,000

A Polish Vampire in Burbank is a 1983 horror comedy film.

== Plot ==
The film depicts an inexperienced vampire named Dupah ("ass" in Polish), played by director Mark Pirro, who is reluctant to bite his first victim.

== Cast ==
Actor	Role
Mark Pirro	Dupah
Lori Sutton	Delores Lane
Bobbi Dorsch	Misty
Hugh O. Fields	Dupah's father
Marya Gant	Yvonne
Steven Dorsch	Ernie
Brad Waisbren	Ted
Eddie Deezen	Sphincter
Paul Farbman	The Queerwolf
Conrad Brooks	Bartender
Alfie Pearl	Theatre Usher
Louise Samuels	Hooker
Tyrone Dubose	Pimp
Jim Bruce	Mayonaise Man
Phil Liskum	Bar Patron
Catharine Wheatley	Judo For Jesus Girl
John McCafferty	Spy
Katina Garner	Cleavage Woman
Rik Martino	Jealous Boyfriend
Lois Hunter	Old Lady
James Hunter	Old Man

== Production ==
Pirro had originally intended for the film to star Grease actor Eddie Deezen, who had agreed to appear in it as a favor to a friend, but he left the production shortly after shooting began. Pirro reworked Deezen's scenes into flashbacks, using audio clips to voice the skeletal remains of his character, and played the lead role of Dupah himself.

Filmed for just $2,500, Pirro sold A Polish Vampire in Burbank to a home video company for $40,000, and it went on to gross $500,000 in cassette sales. The minor character of the Queerwolf would later be featured in Pirro's 1988 film Curse of the Queerwolf.
