= Deathrow Gameshow =

1987 film

- Directed by: Mark Pirro
- Screenplay by: Mark Pirro; Alan Gries (additional material by)
- Produced by: Brian J. Smith; Sergio Bandera; Glenn Campbell; Mark Pirro; Steven J. Wolfe (uncredited)
- Starring: John McCafferty; Robyn Blythe; Beano; Darwyn Carson; Mark Lasky
- Cinematography: Craig Bassuk
- Music by: Gregg Gross
- Production company: Crown International Pictures
- Release date: December 4, 1987 (United States)
- Running time: 83 minutes
- Country: United States
- Language: English
- Budget: $200,000 (estimated)

Deathrow Gameshow is a 1987 black comedy film, directed by Mark Pirro, in which condemned prisoners are given opportunities to be granted reprieves for their sentences by participating in a television game show. Starring John McCafferty and Beano, it has gained a cult following since its initial release.

== Synopsis ==
Chuck Toedan is a TV producer who hosts a game show named Live or Die, where condemned prisoners participate for the chance to earn their freedom. If they fail, they are executed on live TV. The show is successful, however there are those who protest the show's cruelty. On one episode Toedan executes the head of the Spumoni crime family in a humiliating fashion. This angers the crime family, who sends out an assassin named Luigi to murder Toedan. The mission becomes personal for Luigi when his senile mother becomes a contestant after wandering onto the set. Toedan learns of the assassin's existence while talking to Gloria, a protestor he met on a talk show. They are quickly captured and forced to participate in Live or Die. They are ultimately saved when a fan arrives on set and shoots Luigi so that he will be sent to prison and become a contestant.

== Cast ==
- John McCafferty as Chuck Toedan
- Robyn Blythe as Gloria Sternvirgin
- Beano as Luigi Pappalardo
- Darwyn Caron as Trudy
- Mark Lasky as Mama Pappalardo
- Paul Farbman as Dino
- Debra Lamb as Shanna Shallow
- Bill Whitehead as Don Stuart
- Paul Farbman as Dino

== Release ==
Deathrow Gameshow was released to theaters in the United States on December 4, 1987. It has received several home video releases. It was released as part of the Rare Cult Cinema DVD box set through Mill Creek Entertainment and received a Blu-ray release through Vinegar Syndrome in 2018.

A director's cut was released in 2015 and included as part of the Vinegar Syndrome Blu-ray.

== Reception ==
Ted Mahar reviewed the film for The Oregonian, where he gave it one star and stated that it had a good concept that was poorly executed. David Pickering of the Corpus Christi Caller-Times was also critical, stating that it was "sorely lacking, except in the darkly humorous opening sequence."

Contemporary reviews have been more favorable. Nerdly's Phil Wheat reviewed the Vinegar Syndrome release in 2016, praising the film transfer and stating that the movie had "a satirical, dark edge – reminding me very much of Troma’s output from the same era – mixing sex, sleaze and over-the-top, politically incorrect comedy to perfection."
