= Motorpsycho (film) =

1965 film by Russ Meyer

- Theatrical release poster
- Directed by: Russ Meyer
- Written by: James Griffith; Hal Hopper; Russ Meyer; W. E. Sprague
- Produced by: Eve Meyer; Russ Meyer
- Starring: Alex Rocco; Haji; Joseph Cellini; Arshalouis Aivazian; Richard S. Brummer; George Costello; Coleman Francis; Sharon Lee; Steve Masters; Russ Meyer; Stephen Oliver; F. Rufus Owens; Thomas Scott; Holle K. Winters
- Cinematography: Russ Meyer
- Edited by: Russ Meyer; Charles G. Schelling
- Music by: Paul Sawtell (uncredited); Bert Shefter (uncredited); Sidney Cutner (stock music) (uncredited)
- Distributed by: Eve Productions Inc.
- Release date: August 12, 1965
- Running time: 74 min.
- Country: United States
- Language: English

Motorpsycho or Motor Psycho is a 1965 action film by Russ Meyer. Produced just before Meyer's better-known Faster, Pussycat! Kill! Kill! (1965), the film explores similar themes of sex and violence but focuses on a male motorcycle gang rather than the female gang of go-go dancers featured in the later film. Motorpsycho also contains one of the first portrayals of a disturbed Vietnam veteran character in film.

== Plot ==
A veterinarian's wife is raped by a motorcycle gang led by a sadistic Vietnam War veteran. After the gang kills an old man, the veterinarian and his wife resolve to hunt the gang.

== Cast ==
- Haji as Ruby Bonner
- Alex Rocco as Cory Maddox
- Stephen Oliver as Brahmin
- Holle K. Winters as Gail Maddox
- Joseph Cellini as Dante
- Thomas Scott as Slick
- Coleman Francis as Harry Bonner
- Sharon Lee as Jessica Fannin
- Steve Masters as Frank
- Arshalouis Aivazian as Wife
- E. E. Meyer as Sheriff
- George Costello as Doctor

== Production ==
Russ Meyer, whose previous films had faced stiff resistance from censors, sought to create a more action-oriented film. The working title of the film was Rio Vengeance.

Haji was a nightclub dancer when she auditioned for the film. Meyer cast her in a smaller role but soon promoted her to one of the lead roles. She later recalled:

Russ worked with a five-man crew, and he took us all into the desert with snakes, lizards, and all kinds of danger. He thought if you were a guy, you could live in a tent out in the desert, but the ladies he treated better. We lived in a trailer. When you shoot in the desert, you come back with dirt in your eyelashes and hair. Our shower was a big barrel with a cork in it, set up on four sticks. You pulled the cork out, got wet, stuck the cork back in, soaped up, pulled the cork back out, rinsed off, and that was it!

Two actors were injured while filming a scene involving motorbikes and were hospitalized.

== Reception ==
According to Meyer, the film went "through the roof" commercially, inspiring him to create a similar film with female bikers, Faster Pussycat! Kill! Kill!.

The Los Angeles Times wrote that Motorpsycho and Faster Pussycat "pack as much sex and violence as possible on the screen without bringing in the police. In fact, they're so ludicrously erotic and sadistic they can be taken as parodies of the entire genre of exploitation pictures." The websites Letterboxd, and The Grindhouse Database list this movie as belonging to the vetsploitation subgenre.

== See also ==
- List of American films of 1965
- Outlaw biker film
- List of biker films
- Exploitation film
