= Beneath the Valley of the Ultra-Vixens =

1979 film by Russ Meyer

- Directed by: Russ Meyer
- Screenplay by: Roger Ebert (Note: as R. Hyde); Russ Meyer (Note: as B. Callum)
- Story by: Russ Meyer
- Produced by: Russ Meyer
- Starring: Francesca "Kitten" Natividad; Ken Kerr; Anne Marie; June Mack; Uschi Digard; Sharon Hill
- Cinematography: Russ Meyer
- Edited by: Russ Meyer
- Music by: William Tasker
- Production company: RM Films International
- Distributed by: RM Films International
- Release date: 1979
- Running time: 93 minutes
- Country: United States
- Language: English

Beneath the Valley of the Ultra-Vixens is a 1979 satirical sexploitation film directed by American film-maker Russ Meyer and written by Roger Ebert and Meyer. It stars Kitten Natividad and Ann Marie with a cameo by Uschi Digard.

== Plot ==
Among the people of Small Town, U.S.A. are: evangelical radio preacher Eufaula Roop who mounts Martin Bormann inside a coffin; a salesman and a large-breasted housewife; and Junkyard Sal who has sex with her working-class employees. Finally there is Lamar, who anally rapes his large-breasted wife Lavonia after she tries having vaginal sex. Afterwards, she kicks him in the groin.

While Lamar heads off to his junkyard work, Lavonia spots a young man skinny dipping in a lake. She sneaks off and undresses, then jumps the boy from behind and proceeds to rape him. The young man soon escapes, but she dives down, catches him underwater by fellating him and then overpowers him. After he succumbs to her, she learns his name is Rhett and that he is fourteen. Later on, the aforementioned salesman comes to her home and they end up having sex too.

Meanwhile, Lamar, who previously turned down Junkyard Sal's invitation for sex, gets called to her office where she meets him in her underwear. She locks him inside and threatens to fire him if he does not succumb to her. Lamar, who needs money for correspondent school, lies down on her bed. She forces herself on him in numerous sexual positions. After a while, she lets Lamar have anal sex with her and gives in when a suddenly enthusiastic Lamar stops her from continuing into other positions. Lamar then spots fellow employees peeping from the window. He breaks open the door and beats them up. Junkyard Sal then fires the peepers and Lamar for being "perverts".

Lamar goes to a bar, where Lavonia masks herself as Mexican stripper Lola Langusta and drugs his drink. In a motel room, Lavonia rapes the unconscious Lamar — by first triggering an erection via fellation, and then by finally having vaginal sex with him using a sock as contraception. She frees him to test if she changed his ways, but he runs away. Back home, Lavonia has sex with a truck driver. As she checks the clock smiling, Lamar returns. A fight ensues and Lavonia helps Lamar by burning the truck driver's scrotum with a light bulb.

Lamar takes Lavonia and himself into dentist/marriage counselor Asa Lavender. After the dentist takes Lavonia to the dental room, his nurse Flovilla kisses Lamar. As the dentist hurts Lavonia's teeth and she counters by grabbing his crotch painfully, Lamar rapes the nurse. The doctor then switches places with the nurse. When seeing Lamar still has his pants down, the doctor tries to rape him, but Lamar hides in the closet. While the nurse and Lavonia have sex using the nurse's double-ended dildo, the doctor uses various weapons to force Lamar out of the closet. Lamar eventually beats the doctor up and interrupts Lavonia and the nurse. An arrangement of Stranger in Paradise is played in the background throughout the dentist scene.

Lamar decides his cure lies in faith. After dropping him off at the radio station (a power station), Lavonia goes home and has sex once again with the truck driver. Lamar takes his pants off in front of Eufaula Roop's booth and reveals an erection. She immediately goes off the air. When Lamar tells her he wants to be saved, she sends him to her cleansing room (a bathroom) while she changes clothes. Lamar lies inside a water-filled bathtub as a robe wearing Eufaula Roop stands above him and baptizes (and almost drowns) him. Suddenly she takes her robe off, sits down on him and rapes him, all the while preaching to her listeners about his salvation. Lamar heads off home, punches the truck driver and finally has sex with Lavonia who rejoices.

After Eufaula Roop leans back on her chair and moans, the teen-aged Rhett climbs from under her desk and she takes him to the bathtub.

The narrator heads off to his own home, where the teen-aged Rhett, his son, has sex with the narrator's huge-breasted younger Austrian wife, SuperSoul, during an earthquake.

== Cast ==
- Kitten Natividad as Lavonia Shed
- Anne Marie as Sister Eufaula Roop
- Ken Kerr as Lamar Shed
- June Mack as Junk Yard Sal
- Lola Langusta as Stripper - this character is credited as such, but is actually played by Natividad
- Patrick Wright as Mr. Peterbuilt
- Michael E. Finn as Semper Fidelis
- Steve Tracy as Rhett
- Sharon Hill as Nurse Flovilla Thatch
- Henry Rowland as Martin Bormann
- Robert E Pearson as Dr. Asa Lavender
- DeForest Covan as Zebulon
- Don Scarbrough as Beau Badger
- Aram Katcher as Tyrone
- Uschi Digart as SuperSoul
- Mary Gavin as The Very Big Blonde
- Stuart Lancaster as The Man From Small Town, USA - the narrator of the film
- Russ Meyer as Himself

== Production ==
Meyer said the film was a spoof of Our Town.

The film was co-written by Roger Ebert who wanted to use a pseudonym.

Meyer made the film for $300,000. He said he kept the cost down by doing "everything to scale. You edit it yourself, you co-write it, you coscore it, you're your own cameraman, producer, director, and you cast the picture. You shoot it in the front room of your house. I bought a house that had a 28-foot ceiling, and we built the sets in the house, because it was scaled in such a way. I wanted to photograph it myself, because it was a kind of umbilical cord, to see what was happening before you said, "Print it"."

Meyer said a lot of the lines were looped. Natividad "because of the shit-kicker style, worked with Bob Easton, who is a very good dialect coach" and because June Mack "spoke without any trace of accent... we hired a girl who had formerly come from Mississippi to dub her voice."

== In popular culture ==
The film receives a mention in the first episode of Life Is Strange, alongside other historically notable films such as Cannibal Holocaust, Faster, Pussycat! Kill! Kill!, and Tetsuo: The Iron Man.
