= Up! (1976 film) =

1976 film by Russ Meyer

- Film poster
- Directed by: Russ Meyer
- Screenplay by: Russ Meyer (Note: as B. Callum)
- Story by: Russ Meyer; Anthony-James Ryan (Note: as Jim Ryan); Roger Ebert (Note: as Reinhold Timme)
- Produced by: Russ Meyer
- Starring: Raven De La Croix; Robert McLane; Kitten Natividad; Monty Bane
- Cinematography: Russ Meyer
- Edited by: Russ Meyer
- Music by: William Loose; Paul Ruhland
- Production company: RM Films International
- Distributed by: RM Films International
- Release date: October 1976
- Running time: 80 minutes
- Country: United States
- Language: English

Up! is a 1976 American softcore sex comedy film directed by Russ Meyer and starring Raven De La Croix, Robert McLane, Kitten Natividad, and Monty Bane.

== Plot ==
The Greek Chorus, who appears nude except for long black boots, opens the film and appears between scenes throughout the film to provide narration, plot details, and updates.

A man named Adolf Schwartz, Adolf Hitler in hiding, is living in a Bavarian-style castle in northern California. After an orgy in the dungeon with three women (The Headsperson, The Ethiopian Chef, Limehouse) and a man (Paul), he is murdered when someone places a ravenous piranha fish in his bathtub.

Some time later, Margo Winchester hitchhikes to the nearby town of Miranda and is spotted by local Sheriff Homer Johnson. Homer tries to make advances, but Margo rejects him flirtatiously. After that, she is picked up by Leonard Box, a known troublemaker and son of a sawmill owner. An argument breaks out between the two, and Leonard subdues and rapes an unconscious Margo, who regains consciousness and kills him in retaliation. Homer witnesses this, but covers up the incident because Leonard's loaded father could put Margo in jail forever, and so Homer uses the incident to his leverage. Margo sleeps with him, starting a relationship that would turn out to be mutually unfaithful.

Homer helps Margo get a job at the local diner, Alice's. It is owned by Alice who is married to Paul, who was sexually servicing Schwartz. Alice also likes women, depicted earlier in the movie. Paul is similarly unfaithful: he was interested in Limehouse, and after Margo finishes work and goes for a swim at the Salmon Creek, he comes after her. While Margo undresses besides the stream, Paul does the same before approaching her, and they have sex. Homer, who had stopped a woman earlier for a traffic violation and let her go after a blowjob, is in bed with a Native American woman named Pocohontas and shoves her out of the house when he hears Margo's van approaching, after she and Paul finished their date. Still nude, she enters the house, seemingly ready for a second round with Homer, who's under the shower to clean himself up. He scalds himself with hot water by accident. Margo comments on his red penis that he must have made it with an Indian!

Margo later performs a strip show at a bar, which triggers the reaction of lumberjack Rafe, who rapes her. The other guests join in, and they flee when Homer arrives on the scene. Rafe and Homer fight, and both men end up killing each other.

Margo stops by a phone booth, revealing that she is an undercover cop sent to investigate the crime. She takes a shower, during which she is suddenly attacked by figure in black. After running into the forest, it is revealed that her attacker is Alice. Alice reveals that she is Adolf's murderer and also his daughter. She murdered Adolf out of jealousy that he was sleeping with Paul, and plans to do the same to Margo. After fighting in the creek, Alice and Margo reconcile, and Alice leads Margo to a bed frame in the middle of the forest. Suddenly, Paul appears and shoots Alice out of revenge for Adolf, whom he loved. Margo disarms Paul and apprehends the two.

== Cast ==
- Raven De La Croix as Margo Winchester
- Edward Schaaf as Adolph Schwartz
- Robert McLane as Paul
- Kitten Natividad as The Greek Chorus
- Candy Samples as The Headsperson (credited as Mary Gavin)
- Su Ling as "Limehouse"
- Janet Wood as Alice "Sweet Li'l Alice"
- Linda Sue Ragsdale as Gwendolyn
- Monty Bane as Homer Johnson
- Marianne Marks as Chesty Young Thing
- Larry Dean as Leonard Box
- Bob Schott as Rafe
- Foxy Lae as Pocohontas
- Ray Reinhardt as The Commissioner
- Elaine Collins as The Ethiopian Chef
- Ken Kerr as Villager at Alice's Café

== Production ==
In the early 1970s, Russ Meyer made two flops in a row, The Seven Minutes and Black Snake, before returning to his older style with Supervixens. He said, "I'm back to big bosoms, square jaws, lotsa action and the most sensational sex you ever saw. I'm back to what I do best - erotic, comedic sex, sex, sex - and I'll never stray again."

Supervixens was a hit, and Meyer said afterwards, "I plan to stick to what I know works and make one X picture after the next and be even more outrageous with sex and keep pushing the boundaries further and further."

"Sure, it appeals to prurient interest," said Meyer. "Why not appeal to prurient interest?"

The film starred Kitten Natividad, who Meyer would become romantically involved with. Natividad later said she "loved" making the film. She was comfortable with the nudity, "but what was uncomfortable was when he would direct me and I had all these big, big lines and he would say, "don't blink" and I was facing the sun and my eyes would get dry... It was uncomfortable making it because I sat on trees that had ants crawling up my ass."

The movie took place and was filmed in and about a small cabin on Salmon Creek near Miranda in Northern California at the summer cabin of Wilfred Bud Kues, listed as part of the movies' production team and a life-long friend of Russ Meyer, having met at the Alameda Naval Air Station during World War II, and mentioned in Russ' tremendous three-volume life story. Bud's 1953 International pick-up and the appearance in the film of the actual town of Miranda Postmaster William Bill Klute were quite real, and still are memories of the older residents of the small Humbolt County town of Miranda.

Meyer said he found "there was a lot of objection to the violence" in the film. "I always felt that they would take it in the manner I presented it. That if a man got a double-bitted axe buried in his chest, he could still wrench it out, run 100 yards and kill a giant with a chainsaw. But they just took it very seriously. So what I've done is to kind of ape the violence that I've had before, and it seems to get a good reaction."

Meyer said the film cost almost as much as Ultravixens "simply because I had to do so many inserts and so forth. The cost of additional shooting can be very substantial. You have to consider the escalation of lab costs."

== Reception ==
Meyer later said he was "not particularly" pleased with the film. "At the time I was fairly pleased, but I see a lot of reasons why it was not as successful as Supervixen is."

Up! is said to be one of Meyer's most sexually progressive films. Filmink notes that "half the characters... are bisexual."
