= Bert Shefter =

Russian composer

Bert Shefter (May 15, 1902 – June 29, 1999) was a Russian-born film composer who worked primarily in America.

== Biography ==
He was born in Poltava, Russian Empire (now Ukraine.) After emigrating to the USA he attended the Carnegie Institute, Philadelphia’s Curtis Institute of Music & the Damrosch Institute, NYC. He began his musical career as a duo-pianist with Morton Gould (known as "Shefter & Gould".) They performed in theaters and on the radio between 1930–1936. He developed his skills as a conductor, and began appearing both as solo pianist and conductor on stage. He was the guest conductor at Carnegie Hall during the 1946–1947 season.

He formed his own orchestra, and appeared on New York radio including some broadcasts over the NBC Network. He also conducted his orchestra on recordings for several record labels and for the "Muzak" store music service.

His first work in film music was as musical director for the production One Too Many in 1950.

In the late 1950s, Shefter struck up an alliance with fellow film composer Paul Sawtell and they produced many film scores together. Most notably they provided the music to classic science fiction and horror films including Kronos (1957), It! The Terror from Beyond Space (1958), Return of the Fly (1959), The Lost World (1960), Voyage to the Bottom of the Sea (1961, in cooperation with producer Irwin Allen), and Jack the Giant Killer (1962). In 1965 they composed some scores for the director Russ Meyer, such as the cult classic Faster Pussycat! Kill! Kill! and Motorpsycho. The last score they provided was for the Mexican film Emiliano Zapata in 1970 shortly before Sawtell's retirement.

== Later years ==
He retired in 1975 and died in 1999 at the age of 97 in West Hollywood, CA.

== Selected filmography ==
- The Great Jesse James Raid (1953)
- The Big Chase (1954)
- Kronos (1957)
- Hell Ship Mutiny (1957)
- Ambush at Cimarron Pass (1958)
- It! The Terror from Beyond Space (1958)
- Return of the Fly (1959)
- The Big Circus (1959)
- The Sad Horse (1959)
- The Lost World (1960)
- Voyage to the Bottom of the Sea (1961)
- Jack the Giant Killer (1962)
- The Last Man on Earth (1964)
- Curse of the Fly (1965)
- Faster Pussycat! Kill! Kill! (1965)
- Motorpsycho (1965)
- The Last Shot You Hear (1969)
- Emiliano Zapata (1970)
- The Gatling Gun (1971)
