= Paul Trinka =

American film and television actor (1932–1973)

- Publicity Photo of Paul Trinka
- Born: Paul Francis Trinka; January 26, 1932; Blairsville, Pennsylvania, U.S.
- Died: December 28, 1973 (aged 41); Beverly Hills, California, U.S.
- Education: Los Angeles City College
- Occupations: Film and television actor
- Years active: 1959–1971

Paul Francis Trinka (January 26, 1932 – December 28, 1973) was an American film and television actor. He was known for playing Patterson in the American science fiction television series Voyage to the Bottom of the Sea.

== Life and career ==
Trinka was born in Blairsville, Pennsylvania. He attended Blairsville Middle-High School where he graduated in 1952, and served in the United States Army in Korea. He also served in the United States Air Force. After being discharged, Trinka attended Los Angeles City College, where he studied in drama and psychology. He performed in theatre in New York and Los Angeles, California.

Trinka began his screen career in 1959, appearing in the film Operation Dames. He also guest-starred in television programs including Ben Casey, My Three Sons and Adventures in Paradise. Trinka co-starred in the science fiction television series Voyage to the Bottom of the Sea, where he played the role of the seaman Patterson. He played Kirk in the 1965 film Faster, Pussycat! Kill! Kill!. Trinka had a fan club, started by young girls, called the "Paul Trinka Fan Club". Its motto was "Don't be a Finka... Watch Paul Trinka".

== Death ==
Trinka died in December 1973 at the Riverside Hospital in Beverly Hills, California, at the age of 41 from brain cancer.
