= Short Ribbs =

- Genre: Sketch comedy
- Directed by: Michael Rann
- Starring: Billy Barty; Kevin Bickford; Jimmy Briscoe; Joe Gieb; Patty Maloney
- Country of origin: United States
- Original language: English
- No. of seasons: 1
- No. of episodes: 13

Production
- Executive producer: Billy Barty
- Producer: William Winckler
- Production companies: Billy Barty Productions; Golden Orange Broadcasting

Original release
- Network: KDOC-TV
- Release: September 1989 – November 1989

Short Ribbs is a weekly local sketch comedy program that was broadcast in the Orange County / Los Angeles area on KDOC-TV. Featuring a midget and dwarf cast, The show starred veteran actor Billy Barty, whose production company produced the program.

The format of Short Ribbs was similar to Saturday Night Live, featuring take-offs of TV shows and commercials. The series was sponsored by 7 Up, and first aired on KDOC-TV on Saturday night, September 23, 1989, at 8:30 pm, running for 13 episodes.

== Court case ==
While the program is relatively obscure outside of Southern California, it is known for the court case that followed the following year. In 1990, Barty was sued in small claims court by two of the writers of Short Ribbs, producer and writer William Winckler, and writer Warren Taylor. Winckler and Taylor filed separate lawsuits against Barty for money owed, and Barty lost both cases.

News of Barty losing in small claims court made headlines all over the world, with lead stories such as Barty Comes Up Short in Small Claims, and other such puns. Barty claimed the lawsuit news was the most negative publicity he ever got, and compared it to similar bad press Zsa Zsa Gabor received for slapping a Beverly Hills police officer.
