= Jim Hanks =

American actor and filmmaker (born 1961)

- Born: James Mathew Hanks; June 15, 1961 (age 65); Shasta County, California, U.S.
- Occupations: Actor; filmmaker
- Years active: 1992–present
- Spouse: Karen Praxel (m. 1986)
- Children: 1
- Relatives: Tom Hanks (brother); Larry Hanks (brother); Colin Hanks (nephew); E. A. Hanks (niece); Chet Hanks (nephew); Rita Wilson (sister-in-law)

James Mathew Hanks (born June 15, 1961) is an American actor and filmmaker. He has played numerous minor roles in film and guest appearances on television. Bearing both a face and a voice that resemble those of his older brother Tom Hanks, he often serves as a voice double for Woody in Toy Story media when the latter is unavailable. He has produced, directed, and filmed several short films. Hanks made his film debut in Buford's Beach Bunnies (1993).

== Early life ==
James Mathew Hanks was born in Shasta County, California on June 15, 1961. He is the son of Janet Marylyn (née Frager) and itinerant cook Amos Mefford Hanks. Hanks is also the youngest brother of fellow actor Tom Hanks and entomologist Larry Hanks, but they were not raised together. After their parents divorced, Jim went to Red Bluff, California with his mother while older siblings Tom, Larry, and Sandra remained with their father. After college, he lived in Sacramento working as a waiter. The agent who employed his actress wife Karen Praxel as a receptionist encouraged him to get into acting. After he took acting lessons, he moved to Los Angeles in 1992 and began his career with roles in B-movies and commercial voice-overs.

== Career ==
He got his first lead role as Jeeter Buford in Buford's Beach Bunnies (1993). Wishing to earn the role based on his own abilities, he auditioned as "Jim Matthews" (just his first and a modification of his middle name). While producers noted his "resemblance to Tom Hanks", he won the role based on his own comedic and acting skills and his relationship to his brother was not revealed until paperwork was completed.

In 1995, A Current Affair revealed that Tom had created the mannerisms for the character of Forrest Gump based on the simpleton mannerisms earlier created by Jim for the role of Jeeter, including Forrest's "now-famous jerky run". His physical resemblance to his brother allowed him to act as body double for him in scenes in Forrest Gump. Due to his vocal similarity, and with his brother Tom's personal recommendation, he often substitutes for Tom in the role of Sheriff Woody in various Toy Story video games and spin-offs while also voicing Woody in almost all real life sold merchandise.

Hanks began to provide the voice of Geoffrey the Giraffe in the Toys "R" Us commercials in 2001 and is the voice of Rudy from the Red Robin Gourmet Burgers commercials.

He guest-starred in an episode of Scrubs, appearing as a "Dr. Turner" partnered with recurring character Dr. Hooch, in reference to his brother's film Turner & Hooch.

In the 1998 film adaptation of O. Henry's "The Ransom of Red Chief", Hanks played the role of the mailman who was the town gossip.

He has appeared on stage, including playing "Lennie Small" in Theatrical Arts International's production of John Steinbeck's Of Mice and Men.

In November 2016, Hanks guest-starred in a web series called Gary CK Needs Work, a parody of the FX show Louie.

== Personal life ==
Hanks married actress Karen Praxel on May 25, 1986 and together they have one son, Gage. The family resides in Venice, California.

He works with Los Angeles–based "Feet First Films", a production company that provides actor demos as well as production support for short films.

== Filmography ==
=== Film ===
Year	Title	Role	Notes
1993	Buford's Beach Bunnies	Jeeter Buford	
1994	Forrest Gump	Forrest Gump	Tom Hanks's body double
1995	Portrait in Red	Detective Wilder	
1995	Xtro 3: Watch the Skies	Prvt. Friedman	
1996	Tiny Toy Stories	Woody (voice)	International release only
1997	Psycho Sushi	Yuriel	
1999	Blood Type	Stew	
1999	Baby Geniuses	Goon Ray	
1999	Inferno	Tour Bus Driver	
2000	Blood on the Backlot	Officer Holbrook	
2000	Buzz Lightyear of Star Command: The Adventure Begins	Woody (voice)	Direct-to-video
2001	Cahoots	Mr. Marsh	
2001	Spirit Rising	Marv Chalsky	
2003	Swing	Club Jimbo Maitre D'	
2004	Purgatory House	Saint James	
2008	Deadwater	Ensign Buford	
2009	Road to the Altar	Dick	
2010	Goofyfoot	Dad	
2010	Acts of Violence	Detective Mike	
2011	Seymour Sally Rufus	Doctor	
2012	Stolen Breath	Actor	
2013	Automotive	Detective Fulton	
2013	Odd Brodsky	Actor playing God	
2013	A Leading Man	Darren Brandl	
2013	I Know That Voice	Himself	Documentary
2017	The Sex Trip	Matt Flannery	
2018	Blood Corral	Michael Arman	
2018	Abnormal Attraction	Frank Stein	
2019	The Long Way	Professor Bob	
2020	Lamp Life	Woody (voice)	Short film

=== Television ===
Year	Title	Role	Notes
1992	Homefront	Ball Player #4	Episode: "First Comes Love, Then Comes Marriage"
1995	The Clinic		
1996	Toy Story Treats	Woody (voice)	
1996	Lois & Clark: The New Adventures of Superman	Les Barrish	Episode: "It's a Small World After All"
1996	Sabrina the Teenage Witch	Jerry	Episode: "The True Adventures of Rudy Kazootie"
1997	Night Man		Episode: "Face to Face"
1998	The Ransom of Red Chief	Mailman	TV movie
1998	Sunset Beach	Spike the dog (voice)	2 episodes
1998–1999	JAG	CPO Kyle Anderson; Chief Kyle Anderson	Episodes: "Jaggle Bells" "Yeah, Baby"
1999	Smart Guy		Episode: "From A to Double D"
1999	Big Guy and Rusty the Boy Robot	Dwayne Hunter	
2000	Zoe, Duncan, Jack & Jane	Duane the Salesman	Episode: "Kiss of Death"
2005	Scrubs	Dr. Turner	Episode: "My Faith in Humanity"
2007	Dexter	Annoyed Man	Episode: "The Dark Defender"
2008	Shark Swarm	Nick Atkins	TV movie
2012	I Married Who?	Director	TV movie
2012–2018	Robot Chicken	Various Voices	8 episodes
2014	Rake	Fred Luntz - Director	Episode: "50 Shades of Gay"
2017	Milo Murphy's Law	Captain Wilson (voice)	Episode: "The Note"
2018	Goldie and Bear	Red's Father (voice)	Episode: "Tess the Giantess/Red Moves Away"

=== Video games ===
Year	Title	Role	Notes
1995	Toy Story	Woody	
1996	Toy Story: Activity Center	Woody	
1996	Animated Storybook: Toy Story	Woody	
1999	Toy Story 2: Activity Center	Woody	
1999	Toy Story 2: Buzz Lightyear to the Rescue	Woody	
2001	Toy Story Racer	Woody	
2003	Extreme Skate Adventure	Woody	
2004	The Polar Express	Conductor, Hobo, Scrooge	
2009	Toy Story Mania!	Woody	
2010	Toy Story 3: The Video Game	Woody	
2011	Kinect Disneyland Adventures	Woody	
2012	Kinect Rush: A Disney-Pixar Adventure	Woody	
2013	Disney Infinity	Woody	
2014	Disney Infinity: Marvel Super Heroes	Woody	
2015	Disney Infinity 3.0	Woody	
2017	Fortnite	In-game NPCs	
2018	Lego The Incredibles	Woody	
2019	Kingdom Hearts III	Woody	
2023	Disney Dreamlight Valley	Woody	
2023	Disney Speedstorm	Woody	

=== Theme parks ===
Year	Title	Role
2008	Toy Story Midway Mania!	Woody

=== Shows ===
Year	Title	Role
1996	Disney on Ice	Woody (voice)

== Filmmaking credits ==
Year	Title	Director	Producer	Writer	Cinematographer	Notes
1995	Back Field in Motion	No	No	No	Yes	Video short
2008	Wish	Yes	Yes	No	Yes	Short film
2008	The Floor	Yes	No	No	Yes	Short film
2010	Deception	No	Yes	No	No	Short film Co-producer
2010	Collision	Yes	Yes	No	No	Short film
2010	Real Men Real Issues	No	No	No	Yes	TV series Episode: "Mine or Mime?"
2010	The Rise and Fall of John Tesoro	No	No	No	Yes	Short film
2011	Hazelnut	Yes	Yes	No	Yes	Short film Co-producer
2011	The Comedy Blips	No	No	No	Yes	TV series
2012	Coveting Roses	Yes	Yes	Yes	Yes	Short film
2013	Dog Gone Missing	No	No	No	Yes	Short film
2013–2014	Bunny and Bee	No	No	No	Yes	4 episodes
2014	Dead Drop	Yes	No	No	No	Assistant director
2014	Breaking Curfew	No	No	No	Yes	TV series
2018	Two Minutes to Midnight	No	Yes	No	No	TV Mini-Series; Episode: "AtomEx"

== Awards and nominations ==
Year	Award	Category	Film	Result
1999	Angel Film Award	Best Supporting Actor	Blood Type	Won
