= Frankenstein vs. the Creature from Blood Cove =

- Directed by: William Winckler
- Written by: William Winckler
- Produced by: William Winckler
- Starring: G. Larry Butler; William Winckler; Dezzirae Ascalon
- Release date: October 4, 2005
- Running time: 90 min
- Language: English

Frankenstein vs. the Creature from Blood Cove is a 2005 horror film written and directed by William Winckler. It is the second film from William Winckler Productions. Filmed in black and white, the film is an homage to classic monster movies, harkening back to the days of Universal's "Monster Rally" heyday. The film was released direct to DVD in 2005 and has since gone on to acquire a growing fan base. Part of the success of the film to date has been the support it has received from horror hosts and fans of late night cinema, with a national syndicated showing on Mr. Lobo's Cinema Insomnia Halloween special as well as local airings on shows from the Horror Host Underground. The film was awarded the "Best Feature Film" award at the 2006 World Horror Convention.

== Plot ==
Mad Doctor Monroe Lazaroff seeks to create a biological "terror weapon" in a secluded beach house. His first creation is an amphibious Creature, created by mixing human, fish and reptile DNA. This Creature turns against its creators and escapes into the nearby ocean and soon is terrorizing those who venture onto its beach territory in Blood Cove. Meanwhile, Dr. Lazaroff and his assistants seek out and retrieve the body of the legendary Frankenstein Monster, with the intention of reviving and conditioning the Monster to obey instructions. Among those attacked by the Creature are magazine photographer Bill Grant and his assistants Dezzirae and Percy, who are pursued by the Creature and forced to seek shelter in the home of the mad Dr. Lazaroff. They are taken captive by the Doctor and his minions and must seek to escape or survive the battle of horrors around them. Once under his control, Lazaroff sends the Frankenstein Monster out to recapture or destroy his original creation, setting the stage for a battle royale on the beach and in the sea.
