= Robyn Blythe =

American former dancer and actress

- Born: United States
- Occupations: Actress, dancer
- Years active: 1974–present

Robyn Blythe is an American former dancer and actress active in the 1970s and 1980s, best known for her featured role in Alice Cooper's film Welcome to my Nightmare (1976) and as a member of The Krofftettes synchronized swimming troupe on TV's The Brady Bunch Hour (1976–77).

In nursery school, Robyn earned the nickname “Miss Hollywood” from her teachers because she would always wear her sunglasses and sing in the sandbox. While growing up, she was a member of the Royal Academy Ballet and the Long Beach Civic Opera. At the age of thirteen, Robyn starred onstage as Laurie in the musical Oklahoma! Then, at seventeen, she was in the touring company of Gigi, which ended its run on Broadway. Calling upon all her talents at age nineteen, Robyn joined rock star Alice Cooper for a six-month national tour and appeared as the lead dancer in his film Welcome to my Nightmare. She then won a role in the original Death Wish (1974). After being a Krofftette in The Brady Bunch Hour, Robyn appeared on Fantasy Island, Charlie's Angels, Trapper John, M.D., General Hospital, and was a featured model in David Lee Roth's music video, "California Girls". Her other stage work includes Babes in Arms, I Love My Wife, and an appearance with Joe Namath and Robert Morse in the musical Sugar. She is also remembered for her role as Gloria Sternvirgin in Mark Pirro's films Deathrow Gameshow (1987) and Rectuma (2003).

== See also ==
- Welcome to my Nightmare
- The Krofftettes
- The Brady Bunch Hour
