= Raven De La Croix =

American actress and stripper

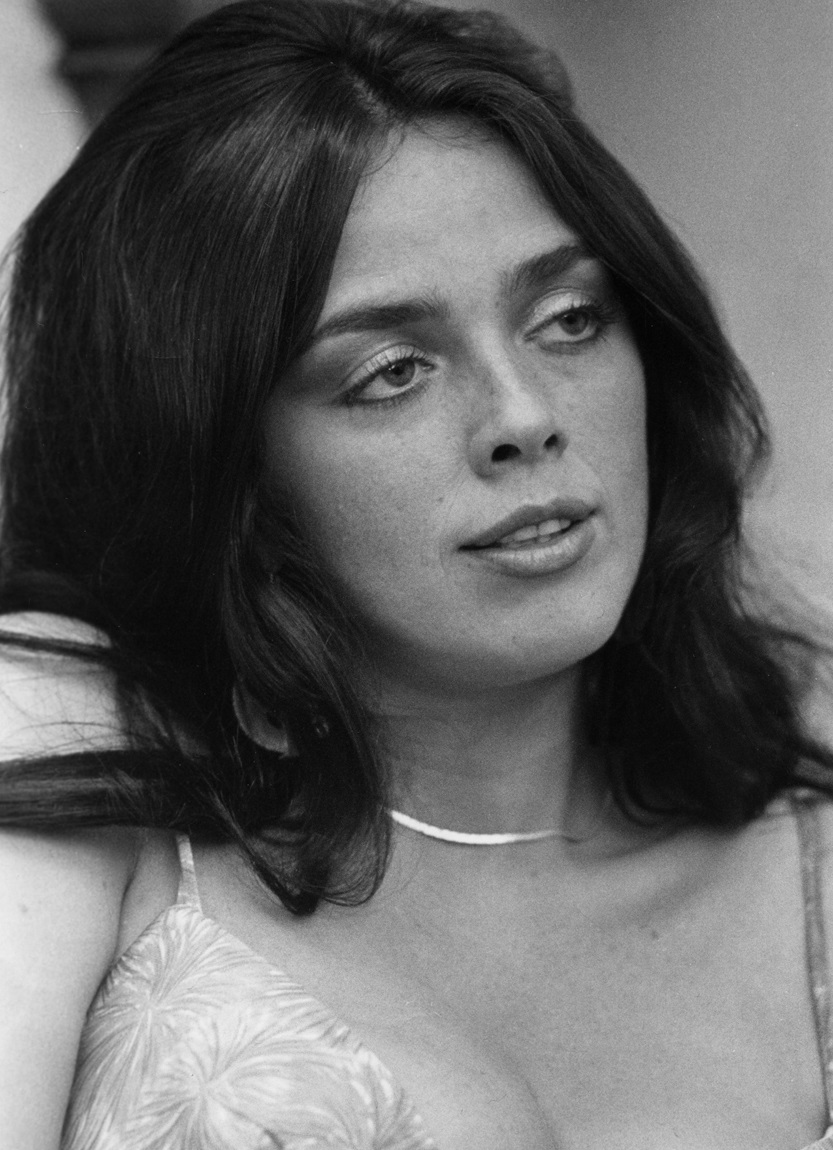
- De La Croix in Up! (1976)
- Born: Lynn Christie Martin; August 24, 1947 (age 79); Manhattan, New York, U.S.
- Other name: Raven De Lumiere

Raven De La Croix (born Lynn Christie Martin; August 24, 1947) is an American actress and stripper known for her lead role in the 1976 Russ Meyer film Up!. When Meyer first discovered her at Joe Allen's, a hangout in West Hollywood, California, she had no acting experience. In 2011, Owen Gleiberman wrote that she "...may be [Meyer's] most spectacular siren". She is the granddaughter of aviation pioneer Lieutenant William Knox Martin.

== Biography ==
De La Croix was born as Lynn Christie Martin in Manhattan, New York City to a poor family and was the oldest of eight children. In Big Bosoms and Square Jaws: The Biography of Russ Meyer, King of the Sex Film, author Jimmy McDonough wrote, "Her exotic looks come from the blend of her father's Comanche Indian heritage and French blood on her mother's side."

She was a licensed nurse and worked for a time at the Columbia Presbyterian Hospital. She also worked several other jobs, including prison drug lecturer where she was seen by a prisoner who later recommended her to work for a theatrical agency. Later, she was noticed in a Hollywood restaurant by a talent scout for Eddie Foy, Jr., which eventually led to an appointment with Russ Meyer. De La Croix also worked at the Melody Burlesk in New York as a stripper.

Her first marriage was abusive. The August 1986 issue of Wrestling Eye Magazine notes on page 48 that, "a recent article in Rock Island, Illinois QUAD TIMES reported she was engaged to wrestler Greg Valentine".

== Filmography ==
=== Films ===
Year	Title	Role	Other notes
1976	Up!	Margo Winchester	(also designed her own costumes and performed her own stunts.)
1977	The Chicken Chronicles	Mrs. Worth	
1977	The Happy Hooker Goes to Washington		
1978	Jokes My Folks Never Told Me	Bride	
1980	The Blues Brothers	Woman in Concert Crowd	(uncredited)
1983	Screwballs	Miss Anna Tomical (a stripper)	
1984	The Lost Empire	Whitestar	(also associate producer, costume designer, acted as animal handler and performed her own stunts.)
1987	Heat and Sunlight	as herself, Raven De La Croix	(her last burlesque performance on film)
1996	The Elastic Zenith	Narrator	(co-producer, documentary)
2001	The Double-D Avenger	Dr. De La Croix	
2005	Frankenstein vs. the Creature from Blood Cove	Gypsy Woman	
2006	Alien Secrets	Brandon's Sister-in-Law	(co-producer)

=== Television ===
Year	Title	Role	Other notes
1982	Hear No Evil	Candy Burns	
1987	A Current Affair	as Rev. Dr. Lynn Christie Ana	
