= Faster, Pussycat! Kill! Kill! =

1965 film by Russ Meyer

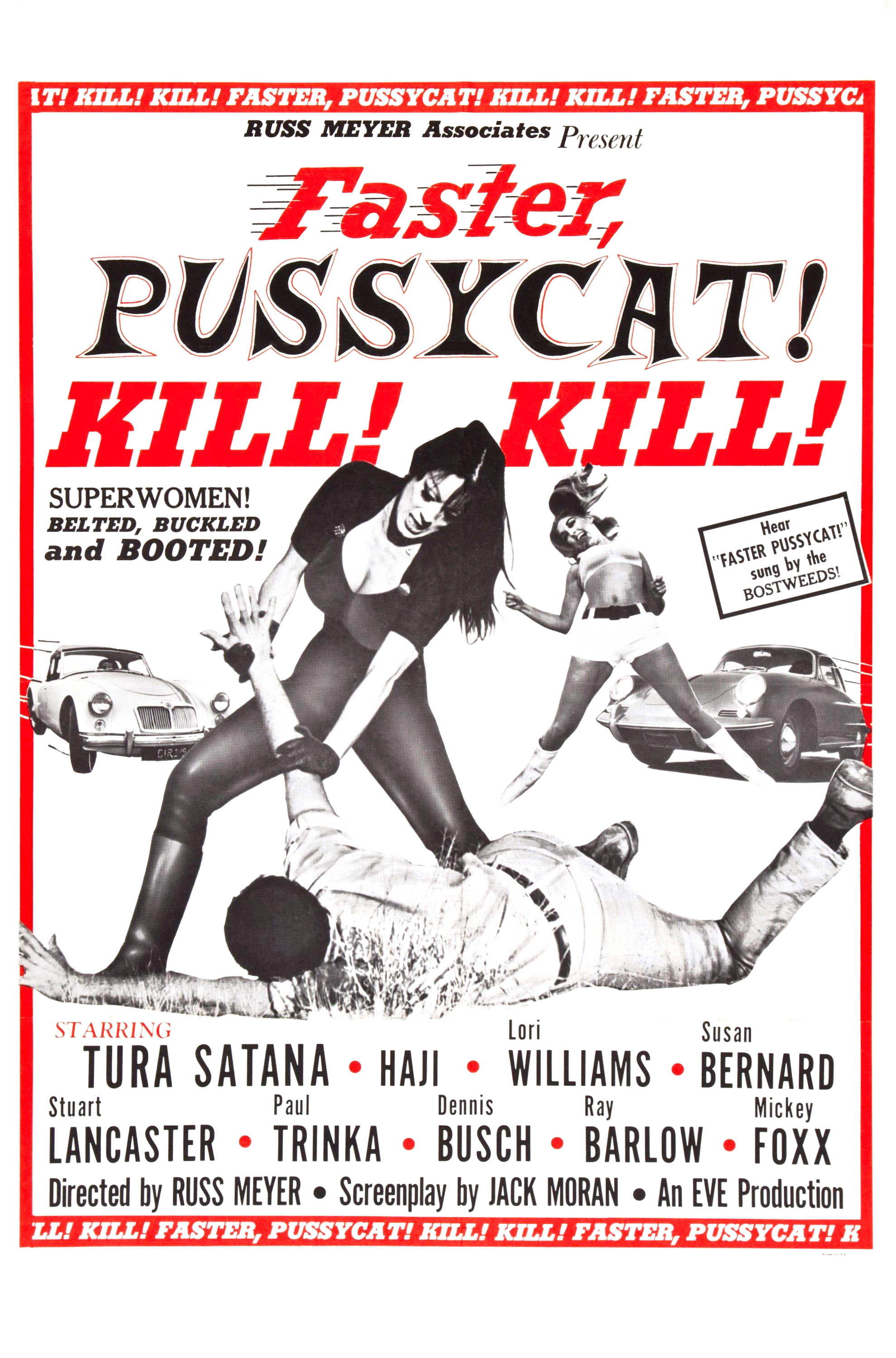
- Original release poster
- Directed by: Russ Meyer
- Screenplay by: Jack Moran
- Story by: Russ Meyer
- Produced by: Russ Meyer; Eve Meyer
- Starring: Tura Satana; Haji; Lori Williams; Susan Bernard; Stuart Lancaster; Paul Trinka; Dennis Busch; Ray Barlow; Mickey Foxx
- Cinematography: Walter Schenk
- Edited by: Russ Meyer
- Music by: Paul Sawtell; Bert Shefter
- Production company: EVE Productions
- Distributed by: Russ Meyer Associates
- Release date: August 6, 1965
- Running time: 83 minutes
- Country: United States
- Language: English
- Budget: $45,000
- Box office: $36,122 (1995 US re-release only)

Faster, Pussycat! Kill! Kill! is a 1965 American exploitation film directed by Russ Meyer and co-written by Meyer and Jack Moran. It follows three go-go dancers who embark on a spree of kidnapping and murder in the California desert.

The film is known for its violence, provocative gender roles, and eminently quotable "dialogue to shame Raymond Chandler". It is also remembered for the performance of star Tura Satana, whose character Richard Corliss called "the most honest, maybe the one honest portrayal in the Meyer canon and certainly the scariest". Faster, Pussycat! was a commercial and critical failure upon its initial release, but it has since become widely regarded as a cult classic and influential film.

== Plot ==
Three wild, uninhibited go-go dancers—Varla, Rosie, and Billie—dance at a club before racing their sports cars across the California desert. They play a high-speed game of chicken on the salt flats and encounter a young couple, Tommy and Linda, out to run a time trial. After breaking Tommy's neck in a fight, Varla kidnaps and drugs Linda.

In a small desert town, they stop at a gas station where they see a wheelchair-using old man and his muscular, dim-witted son. The gas station attendant tells the women that the old man was disabled in a railway accident, "going nuts" as a result, and that he received a large settlement of money that is hidden somewhere around his decrepit house in the desert. Intrigued, Varla hatches a scheme to rob the old man, and the three women follow him back to the ranch, with their captive in tow.

At the ranch, they encounter the old man, his younger son (whom they learn is known as "The Vegetable" due to his feeblemindedness) and his elder son, Kirk. The group all have lunch together, and Billie taunts Rosie when Varla leaves with Kirk, hoping to seduce him into revealing the location of the money. Linda subsequently escapes the drunken Billie and runs away into the desert. The old man and the younger son pursue in their truck. The younger son catches Linda and seems about to assault her, but he collapses in tears as Varla and Kirk arrive. Kirk finally acknowledges his father's lecherous nature and the old man's hold over his younger brother, and he vows to have his younger brother institutionalized. He tries to take the hysterical Linda into town in the truck, but the old man says that he has thrown away the keys, so Kirk and Linda set out across the desert on foot.

Varla drives back to the house and tells Billie and Rosie that they should kill the men and the girl to cover up Linda's kidnapping and the murder of her boyfriend. Billie refuses, but as she walks away, Varla throws a knife into her back just as the old man and his younger son arrive. Rosie and Varla hit the old man with their car, killing him and knocking over his wheelchair to reveal the money hidden inside. Rosie is stabbed to death by the younger son while trying to retrieve the knife from Billie's body. Varla tries to ram him into a wall with her car, injuring him. She drives off in the truck and overtakes Kirk and Linda, chasing them into a gully. Varla and Kirk fight hand-to-hand. She gets the better of him until Linda hits her with the truck, and she dies. Kirk and Linda drive off together in the truck.

== Cast ==
- Tura Satana as Varla
- Haji as Rosie
- Lori Williams as Billie
- Susan Bernard as Linda
- Stuart Lancaster as the Old Man
- Paul Trinka as Kirk
- Dennis Busch as the Vegetable
- Ray Barlow as Tommy
- Mickey Foxx as the Gas Station Attendant
- John Furlong as the Narrator

== Production ==
=== Development ===
Faster, Pussycat! Kill! Kill! was a follow-up to an earlier Meyer film. "'We had just done a film called Motorpsycho, which was about three bad boys, and it had gone through the roof. So I said, 'Well, let's do one with three bad girls'."

The screenplay is credited to Jack Moran from an original story by Russ Meyer. The first draft was titled The Leather Girls and was written over a brief four-day period by Moran, who also collaborated with Meyer on Common Law Cabin and Good Morning and... Goodbye! The screenplay went through a second working title—The Mankillers—and had already begun production when the sound editor, Richard S. Brummer, came up with the now-immortal final title. Although neither Moran nor Meyer overtly cited any prior works as inspiration, the plot has been called a "loose remake of The Desperate Hours, or possibly The Virgin Spring" by one prominent film critic and a "pop-art setting of Aeschylus's Eumenides" by one classical scholar.

=== Casting ===
Haji had worked with Meyer on Motorpsycho. She recommended Tura Satana to him.

Lori Williams later said, "Russ didn't want to hire me because he didn't think I had a big enough bust! I said I could use pushups in my bra, which I did. He didn't know whether it would work, but then in rehearsals he finally said okay. I kind of did my part like a cartoon, like the rest of the film, bigger than life."

=== Filming ===
Faster, Pussycat! had a budget of approximately $45,000 and was shot in black and white in order to save money.

The film began shooting at the Pussycat Club, a strip club in Van Nuys, before moving on to the California desert later that night. The film's early racing scene was shot on the dry salt flats of Cuddeback Lake, the gas station scene was filmed in the town of Randsburg, and the scenes at the Old Man's house at Ollie Peche's Musical Wells Ranch outside the town of Mojave. During principal photography, the cast and crew stayed at the Adobe Motel in Johannesburg.

Meyer, who got his start making films while serving in the US Army's 166th Signal Photographic Company during World War II, had a reputation for running strictly regimented film shoots with a small crew composed largely of former Army buddies. Actor Charles Napier, who appeared in five of Meyer's films, said that "Working with Russ Meyer was like being in the first wave landing in Normandy during World War II." Meyer considered the Faster, Pussycat! shoot no different, saying "It was the usual thing with me. It's like being in the military. Everybody has to get up and do their jobs to get things together, and that's it." Meyer's directorial style and the rules he imposed upon cast and crew caused clashes with his equally strong-willed star, Tura Satana.

There was also friction between Susan Bernard and her director and co-stars, much of which they attributed to the presence of her mother on the set (necessitated by Bernard's being a sixteen-year-old at the time). Bernard has said in interviews that she was truly scared of Satana, and some have thought that this contributed to her performance as a frightened kidnapping victim.

According to Satana,

Everybody [on set] did everything from moving props to marking scenery and marking spots where we had to be in the next take. I had to stage the fight scenes because nobody else knew how to do them, and so literally when I did the fight scenes, I really had to pick up each and every one of those guys and carry them through in order for them to look realistic. Basically I had to lay one guy on the floor because he was afraid he was going to get hurt. A lot of it actually had to be done in reverse, so try to imagine doing a fight scene that way.

=== Music ===
The film's title song, "Faster Pussycat!", was performed by California band the Bostweeds. The lyrics were written by Rick Jarrard and the music was written and sung by Lynn Ready, who formed the Bostweeds and sang leads. The track was never released commercially, but it did appear in February 1966 as a promotional-only 45 rpm single without a B-side.

The original title track Faster, Pussycat, Kill! Kill! was originally written by Big Brother and the Holding company, but ultimately "banned" as stated by Peter Albin of the band.

== Reception and influence ==
=== Box office ===
Faster, Pussycat! Kill! Kill! premiered in Los Angeles on August 6, 1965. Atypically for a Meyer film, it was a box office failure upon its initial release.

"When it first came out, it was not successful", said Meyer. "At the time, people didn't understand that women could have a relationship with other women."

=== Critical response ===
It was generally dismissed as an exploitative "skin flick" by the few critics who took any note of it at all. John L. Wasserman of the San Francisco Chronicle, for example, reviewed a double bill of Faster, Pussycat! and Mudhoney in April 1966, saying that "Pussycat has the worst script ever written, and Mudhoney is the worst movie ever made."

=== Cult status ===
In the years since, the film has been regarded more favorably, gaining in both commercial and critical stature. On Rotten Tomatoes, the film holds an approval rating of 74% based on 31 reviews, with an average rating of 6.8/10. The website's critics consensus reads, "Faster, Pussycat! Kill! Kill! is undoubtedly shlock, but director Russ Meyer's infectious affection for camp gives this anarchic joyride exhilarating flair." In his review of the film's 1995 re-release, Roger Ebert gave the film three out of four stars. Noted feminist film critic B. Ruby Rich said that when she first saw Faster, Pussycat! in the 1970s she "was absolutely outraged that [she had] been forced to watch this misogynist film that objectified women and that was really just short of soft-core porn." Upon viewing it again in the early 1990s, however, she "just loved it" and wrote a piece in The Village Voice reappraising the film and discussing her change in opinion.

Faster, Pussycat! Kill! Kill! is currently number 377th on the Sight & Sound "Greatest Films Poll". It is frequently mentioned on lists of the best B movies and cult films of all time.

The film has also been influential on other filmmakers. Writer-director John Waters stated in his book Shock Value that "Faster, Pussycat! Kill! Kill! is, beyond a doubt, the best movie ever made. It is possibly better than any film that will be made in the future." He later said on its re-release that "it ages like fine wine." Music video director Keir McFarlane acknowledged that a scene in the video for the Janet Jackson song "You Want This" was a direct homage to Faster, Pussycat!, showing the Porsche-driving singer and her female companions driving circles around two men in the desert. The music video for "Say You'll Be There" by Spice Girls was also inspired by this film. Filmmaker Quentin Tarantino referenced the film and thanked Meyer in the credits of his film Death Proof, and it was reported in Variety in 2008 that Tarantino was interested in remaking Faster, Pussycat!

== Television adaptation ==
In May 2021, it was reported that a television series adaptation of the film is in development from bigbaldhead Productions, the production company run by Norman Reedus, and AMC Studios.

== In popular culture ==
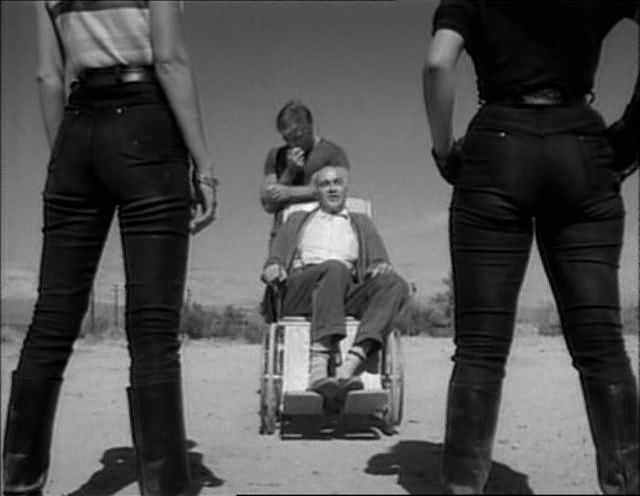
Stuart Lancaster (in wheelchair) as the Old Man

- Audio samples from the film are featured in four songs by metal band White Zombie on their third album, La Sexorcisto: Devil Music Volume One. The dialogue "You're all shook up, aren't you, baby?" and "I never try anything, I just do it. Wanna try me?" are used in the song "Thunder Kiss '65". "You're all shook up, aren't you, baby?" is also used in the song "Cosmic Monsters, Inc." and the line "Now let's move, but let's take the back door" in the song "Welcome to Planet Motherfucker/Psychoholic Slag". Another line, "I work on this baby the same way, trying to get maximum performance", is used in "Black Sunshine".
- The title of Daniel Clowes's graphic novel Like a Velvet Glove Cast in Iron is taken from a line in the film describing Varla.
- The film's title song, "Faster Pussycat!", has been covered several times, most notably by American punk band the Cramps on their 1983 live mini-album Smell of Female.
- The music video for the Janet Jackson song "You Want This" from her self-titled 1993 album Janet pays homage to the film and centers around Jackson as a female gang leader, with the singer and her friends encountering two men in a desert setting.
- The music video for the Spice Girls song "Say You'll Be There" was inspired by the Faster, Pussycat! Kill! Kill! film (and Pulp Fiction). The music video features the group members as female techno-warriors who use martial arts and ninja-influenced weapons to capture a hapless male, much like the film.
- In Quentin Tarantino's 2007 film Death Proof, the character Shanna is wearing a T-shirt featuring Tura Satana's character Varla with the words "BADASS CINEMA" underneath it. Meyer is also one of the directors Tarantino thanks in the end credits.
- Reference is made to a poster of the film in Amy Vincent's 2008 teen novel (under the pen name Claudia Grey) Evernight (at page 134) on the dorm room door of one of the supporting characters.
- The three main antagonist characters in John Lee's 2016 movie Pee-wee's Big Holiday were inspired by the film.
- Operation: Pussycat, a Japanese remake of the film directed by Ryûichi Honda, was released in 2005.
- The film Bitch Slap was inspired by the films of Russ Meyer, especially Faster, Pussycat! Kill! Kill! Much like this film, it follows three female characters who travel to a desert location to find a treasure. The film's opening and closing credits even have clips from Faster, Pussycat! Kill! Kill! in a montage of clips from other B movies.

The film's over-the-top title has become iconic and is frequently referenced or played upon in other popular culture:

- American glam metal band Faster Pussycat took their name from the film.
- American punk rock band Frightwig named their second album Faster, Frightwig, Kill! Kill! (1986).
- The 2008 song "Funplex" by the B-52's features the lyrics "Faster pussycat, thrill thrill", an allusion to the film's title.
- In the Buffy the Vampire Slayer episode "Passion", Xander Harris encourages Buffy and the others to go after the vampire Angelus, saying "If Giles wants to go after the, uh, fiend that murdered his girlfriend, I say, 'Faster, pussycat, kill, kill'."
- An Itchy & Scratchy short entitled "Foster Pussycat! Kill! Kill!" is shown in the Simpsons episode "Home Sweet Homediddly-Dum-Doodily".
- The title of the hit 2006 single "Faster Kill Pussycat" by Paul Oakenfold featuring Brittany Murphy is a play on the title of the film.
- The Boston band Human Sexual Response used the title as the last line in their song, "Blow Up", from the album In a Roman Mood.
- In the game Grand Theft Auto: Chinatown Wars, there is a mission titled "Faster Pusher Man! Sell! Sell!" wherein the protagonist is tasked with peddling cocaine for motorcycle club "The Angels of Death".
- The sixth episode of the CW series Riverdale, "Faster Pussycats Kill Kill" (2017), is titled after the film, the plural variation in reference to the series' characters and band, Josie and the Pussycats.
- The fifth episode of the Netflix animated series Disenchantment, "Faster, Princess! Kill! Kill!", is titled after the film.
- Tim Burton planned on loosely remaking the film in the 90s called Go Baby Go. The title of the film is a reference to the scene in the beginning when the men loudly chant "Go Baby Go!" at the main characters in the film at the club as they danced. The plot centered around three runaway go-go dancers who exposed by a nuclear power plant become 50 feet tall and run-amuck in Las Vegas. The screenplay was written by Jonathan Gems. When Burton and Gems learned that HBO was remaking Attack of the 50 Ft. Woman in 1993, Burton left the project and Gems would later write the screenplay for Burton's 1996 film Mars Attacks! instead.
- In the Futurama episode "The Thief of Baghead", Zoidberg exclaims "Faster, professor! Kill! Kill!", a reference to the title.
- Halloween Pussy Trap Kill! Kill! (2017) was named as a homage to Faster, Pussycat! Kill! Kill!
- In Mad Heidi (2022), President Meili says; "faster pussycat", with the audience chanting; "kill" with lead character fighting in gladiator games to the death.
- The Dungeons and Dragons channel on smart TVs has a segment called "Faster, Purple Worm! Kill! Kill!"
- The sixty-first chapter of the Black Lagoon spinoff series, "Dismemberment Galore! The Gore Gore Girl", is named after the film.
- Kate Nash's 2012 "Faster Pussycat Run Run Tour" is named after the film; Nash has also used the film for concert visuals.

== See also ==
- List of American films of 1965
- List of cult films

== Bibliography ==
- DeFino, Dean (2014). Faster, Pussycat! Kill! Kill!. London: Wallflower Press. ISBN 978-0-23-116739-0.
- McDonough, Jimmy (2005). Big Bosoms and Square Jaws: The Biography of Russ Meyer, King of the Sex Film (1st ed.). New York: Crown. ISBN 1-4000-5044-8.
