= William Winckler =

American actor and independent filmmaker (born 1964)

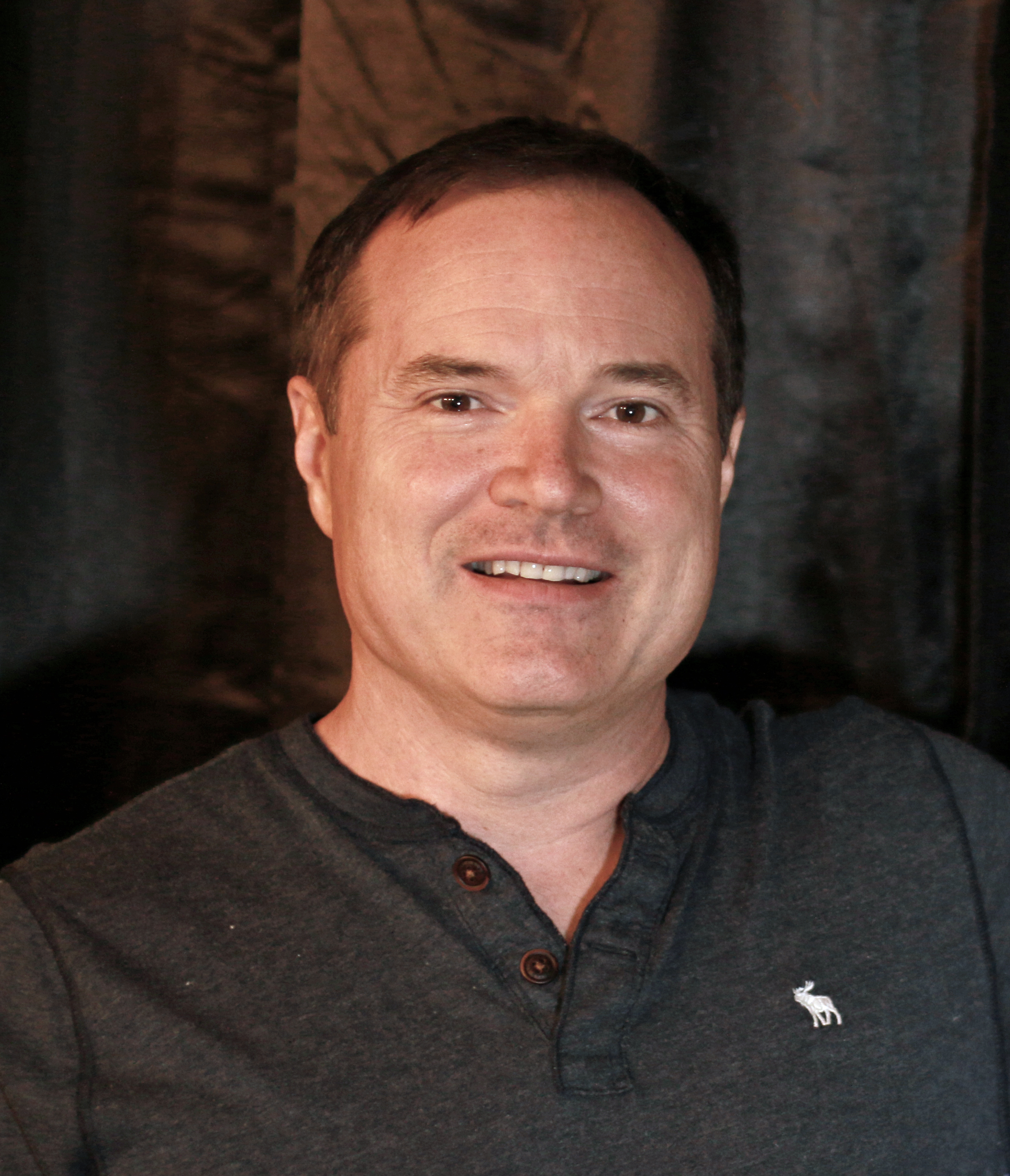
- Born: October 3, 1964 (age 61); California, US
- Occupation(s): Screenwriter, film director, film producer, actor, independent filmmaker, voice actor, businessman
- Years active: 1976-present

William Winckler (born October 3, 1964 in California) is an American actor, businessman, director, producer, and independent filmmaker best known for writing, producing and directing cult movies, horror films and English dubbed animation. He is the son of child actor Robert Winckler (often credited as Robert Winkler).

In the 1980s, Winckler appeared as an actor on TV series such as Remington Steele, Knight Rider, Murder, She Wrote, Doogie Howser, M.D., Designing Women, The Fall Guy, and Short Ribbs starring Billy Barty. Winckler has also provided voice-over work, most notably Ultraman X in Ultraman X: The Movie.

In 1984, he produced and directed the English version of the classic Tatsunoko Production Co. Ltd. anime series Tekkaman the Space Knight. He formed his own production company in 2001, producing and directing as the horror film Frankenstein vs. the Creature from Blood Cove, and the Russ Meyer movie star reunion comedy The Double-D Avenger.

He produced all-new English movie versions of Toei Animation classics Gaiking, Danguard Ace, Space Pirate Captain Harlock, Fist of the North Star, Ashita no Nadja, Science Fiction Saiyuki Starzinger, Digimon Xros Wars, Yes! PreCure 5, and Ge Ge Ge no Kitaro.

North American DVD label Shout! Factory released nine of Winckler's English dubbed anime features from Gaiking, Starzinger, and Danguard Ace throughout 2013.

From 2015 through 2017, William Winckler wrote, produced and directed the American English language versions of Tsuburaya Productions' Ultra Series feature films. Among the movies are Ultraman X The Movie, Ultraman Ginga S The Movie, Mega Monster Battle: Ultra Galaxy, Ultraman Zero: The Revenge of Belial, Ultraman Saga, and Ultra Fight Victory. Ultraman X The Movie is in commemoration to the 50th anniversary of the Ultra Series.
