= Eve Meyer =

American actress (1928–1977)

- Meyer in 1955

Playboy centerfold appearance
- June 1955
- Preceded by: Marguerite Empey
- Succeeded by: Janet Pilgrim

Personal details
- Born: Evelyn Eugene Turner; December 13, 1928 Atlanta, Georgia, U.S.
- Died: March 27, 1977 (aged 48) Tenerife, Canary Islands, Spain

Eve Meyer (born Evelyn Eugene Turner; December 13, 1928 – March 27, 1977) was an American pin-up model, motion picture actress, and film producer. Much of her work was in conjunction with sexploitation filmmaker Russ Meyer, to whom she was married from 1952 to 1969. She was killed in the Tenerife airport disaster in 1977.

== Life ==
Born Eve Turner in Atlanta, Georgia, Turner was a high-profile pin-up model in the 1950s and was Playboy magazine's Playmate of the Month in June 1955. Her unbilled film debut was in Artists and Models (1955). She worked frequently as a photographic model for Russ Meyer after their marriage, appeared in the film Operation Dames (1959), and took a lead role in Meyer's 1960 exploitation film Eve and the Handyman.

Eve Meyer served as producer, or associate or executive producer, on Meyer's 1960s and early 1970s films, including Beyond the Valley of the Dolls (1970).

== Death ==
On March 27, 1977, at Los Rodeos Airport in the Canary Islands, Meyer, onboard Pan Am Flight 1736 from New York, was one of 335 passengers killed when KLM Flight 4805 collided with the Pan Am aircraft during take-off. The disaster is the deadliest accident in aviation history, with 583 total fatalities.

== Filmography ==
=== Actress ===
- Operation Dames (1959) .... Lorry Evering
- Eve and the Handyman (1961) .... Eve/Other roles

=== Producer ===
- Lorna (1964)
- Mudhoney (1965)
- Faster, Pussycat! Kill! Kill! (1965)
- Motorpsycho (1965)
- Mondo Topless (1966)
- Common Law Cabin (1967)
- Good Morning and... Goodbye! (1967)
- Finders Keepers, Lovers Weepers! (1968)
- Vixen! (1968)
- Cherry, Harry & Raquel! (1970)
- Beyond the Valley of the Dolls (1970)
- The Seven Minutes (1971)
- The Jesus Trip (1971)
- Black Snake (1973)

== See also ==
- List of people in Playboy 1953–1959

| Bettie Page | Jayne Mansfield | (no Playmate) | Marilyn Waltz | Marguerite Empey | Eve Meyer |
| Janet Pilgrim | Pat Lawler | Anne Fleming | Jean Moorhead | Barbara Cameron | Janet Pilgrim |
