= Althea Currier =

American actress

- Born: Althea Currier; 1941 (age 84–85); Baileyville, Maine, U.S.
- Modeling information
- Height: 1.61 m (5 ft 3 in)

Althea Currier is an American glamour model and actress, active throughout the 1960s.

== Career ==
Currier was a model and actress who appeared in a number of erotic nudie-cuties and sexploitation B grade films in the 1960s.

She appeared in a number of low-budget B-movies in the early 1960s, making her debut in Russ Meyer's Erotica (1961), reportedly chosen by him because of her large breasts. Currier appeared in several films by Meyer and Peter Perry, and worked with producers such as Dan Sonney and Harry Novak.

Currier became involved in glamour/nude modeling and appeared in many men's magazines of the time, including Mosaic, Modern Man, Adam, Scamp, All Man and Man's Life. She was also featured in Adam magazine's 1964 full-color calendar and wrote an advice column for the magazine entitled "Ask Althea" from 1964 to 1967.

In 1965, Currier worked as an exotic dancer in Chuck Landis' Largo Strip Club in Los Angeles.

== Filmography ==
- Erotica (1961)
- Mr. Peter's Pets (1962)
- Surftide 77 (1962)
- Heavenly Bodies! (1963)
- Knockers Up (1963)
- The Naked Flame (1964)
- Everybody Loves It (1964)
- Kiss Me Quick! (1964)
- Lorna (1964)
- Sinderella and the Golden Bra (1964)
- The Girls on F Street aka Maidens of Fetish Street (1966)

== Select magazine photo layouts ==
- Scamp (1961) Vol. 5, No. 3
- Adam (1962) Vol. 6, No. 6
- Sir Knight (1962) Vol. 3, No. 2
- Mosaic (1962) No. 4
- RizKay (1962) No. 1
- Modern Man (1963) November
- Adam (1963) Vol. 7, No. 11
- Modern Man Annual (1963) Winter
- French Follies (1964) Vol. 2, No. 1
- Adam (1964) Vol. 8, No. 6
- Adam (1965) Vol. 9, No. 6
- Modern Man Deluxe (1966) Vol. 38
- Beau (1967) Vol. 3, No. 14
- All Man (1967) Vol. 8, No. 2
- Man's Life (1970) Vol. 14, No. 1
- Candid (Unknown Year) Vol. 78, No. 7
