= Reflections in the Water =

- UFO episode
- Episode no.: Episode 24
- Directed by: David Tomblin
- Written by: David Tomblin
- Cinematography by: Brendan J. Stafford
- Editing by: Len Walter
- Production code: 23
- Original air date: 6 February 1971

Supporting cast
- Steven Berkoff as Captain Minto; Anouska Hempel as Lieutenant Scott; James Cosmo as Lieutenant Anderson; David Warbeck as the Skydiver captain; Barry Stokes as the Skydiver engineer; Conrad Phillips as the Kingston captain; Gordon Sterne as Ellis, the Kingston helmsman; Fredric Abbott as the Kingston crewman; Richard Caldicot as the film producer; Keith Bell as the film director; Mark Griffith as the diver; Gerald Cross as the insurance man; John Clifford (uncredited) as a SHADO operative; Andrea Allan and Maureen Tann (both uncredited) as Moonbase operatives; George Leech (uncredited) as a doppelganger SHADO operative

Episode chronology
← Previous "Mindbender"	Next → "The Long Sleep"

"Reflections in the Water" is an episode of UFO, a British science fiction television series made by Century 21 Productions for ITC Entertainment. The 23rd episode to be produced, it was written and directed by David Tomblin and filmed in 1970 at Pinewood Studios and on location.

Set in the 1980s, UFO depicts the efforts of a secret organisation, Supreme Headquarters Alien Defence Organisation (SHADO), to counter an alien invasion of Earth. In "Reflections in the Water", SHADO investigates UFO activity in the Atlantic Ocean and discovers an alien underwater habitat on the ocean floor.

"Reflections in the Water" first aired in Japan on 6 February 1971, then Canada on 6 March 1971. In the UK, it was first transmitted on 5 June 1971 by Anglia Television, then on 24 July by Associated Television. Scenes from the episode were later re-edited into ITC's UFO compilation film Invasion: UFO (1981).

== Plot ==
While passing a volcanic island in the Atlantic Ocean, freighter Kingston is sunk by an underwater craft. In space, a surveillance probe is destroyed after detecting a group of more than two dozen unidentified spacecraft. On the Cornish coast, a diver is found murdered after reporting abnormally warm waters and a sighting of tropical fish.

Suspecting an alien plot, SHADO's commander-in-chief Ed Straker orders the Skydiver 1 submarine to Kingston's last known position. Reaching the island, the crew make visual contact with UFOs both underwater and in the air. They discover the cause of the raised ocean temperature: a submarine power cable, running from a generating station on the island as far as the English coast. If undersea UFOs are using the cable as a power source, they can travel to the mainland without surfacing. On the seabed is a vast dome constructed from an unknown translucent material.

Straker and Colonel Foster fly out to Skydiver, then dive down to the dome on sea scooters. The structure lacks any recognisable airlock. Peering inside, they see a man who looks exactly like SHADO officer Lieutenant Anderson.

At SHADO HQ, Anderson is dosed with truth serum and questioned by Straker and Foster. He is adamant that he knows nothing about an undersea installation and has not been out of the country. The orbiting Space Intruder Detector (SID) satellite reports that there are now 50 UFOs massing near Earth. Colonel Lake's computer analysis indicates that the dome's function is to neutralise SHADO's defences, enabling the fleet of UFOs to carry out a full-scale assault on Earth. The computer adds that the skin of the dome is flexible and self-sealing from the underwater pressure.

Straker and Foster return to the dome. They gain entry by pressing against it to open a gap, which instantly closes behind them. Inside, they find what appears to be an empty UFO hangar. They spot Anderson's double and follow him through a maze of corridors. A double of Foster appears and attacks Straker, who throttles him unconscious. Finally they arrive at a reconstruction of SHADO HQ's control room, complete with doubles of Straker and others. The aliens are preparing to transmit a message to Moonbase and Skydiver, ordering them to take no action against the UFO fleet.

Straker and Foster split up to find a way out of the dome and warn SHADO. Foster makes it back to Skydiver, but one of the doubles catches Straker and engages him in a hand-to-hand struggle. Defeating the alien, Straker exits the dome moments before it is torpedoed and destroyed by Skydiver. The explosion travels up the cable, destroying the generating station.

The UFOs launch their attack but are repelled by Skydiver and the Moonbase forces. Later, Foster and Lake wonder how the aliens obtained the likenesses of SHADO personnel and HQ's layout.

== Main cast ==
- Ed Bishop as Colonel Ed Straker
- Michael Billington as Colonel Paul Foster
- Wanda Ventham as Colonel Virginia Lake
- Dolores Mantez as Lieutenant Nina Barry
- Vladek Sheybal as Dr Douglas Jackson
- Ayshea as Lieutenant Ayshea Johnson
- Mel Oxley (uncredited) as the voice of SID

== Production ==
Like another of Tomblin's UFO scripts, "The Long Sleep", this episode begins with a cold open. As in the scripts for "The Long Sleep" and "The Cat with Ten Lives" (also by Tomblin), the opening titles were due to be followed by a montage of action clips from later in the episode to give a preview of the plot. "Reflections in the Water" is the only episode of the three to retain this montage in the final cut.

On 21 July 1970, Tomblin revised the script. In the earlier version, Colonel Lake did not appear and Straker was to have fought his own double in the dome rather than the unnamed alien played by George Leech. Lake was written in by reassigning lines of dialogue from other characters. Lieutenant Anderson was originally "Lieutenant Johnson", but was renamed after it was pointed out that the series already featured a SHADO officer by that name (played by Ayshea). Anderson was written as a replacement for Lieutenant Ford (Keith Alexander, who had left the series by this point in its production). Shortly before filming commenced, the freighter Sheerness was renamed Kingston.

The shoot was delayed, finally beginning on 28 July 1970. Location filming was conducted at Black Park Lake in Iver to represent the sea off Cornwall, as well as on the Pinewood backlot. During the shooting of Straker's duel with Foster's duplicate, series co-producer Gerry Anderson mistakenly thought that actors Ed Bishop and Michael Billington were having a real fight. At the 1989 "UFOria 2" fan convention, Bishop recalled that over the course of filming he was in a wetsuit for three days and lost more than half a stone (7.0 lb; 3.2 kg) in weight.

The episode includes sets, effects and music recycled from earlier Century 21 productions. The Kingston bridge first appeared as the bridge of a naval warship in the UFO episode "Destruction". Some of the Sky 1, SHADO Interceptor and UFO flying sequences were stock footage shot for "Identified", "Flight Path", "The Dalotek Affair" and "The Cat with Ten Lives". The probe destroyed by the aliens first appeared in "Conflict". Some of the incidental music was originally recorded for Stingray (including the episode "The Ghost Ship") and the Captain Scarlet and the Mysterons episode "Model Spy". The shot of Skydiver 1 firing its torpedoes was library footage of an actual military submarine.

== Reception ==
In a mixed review, John Kenneth Muir commented that while the plot elements seem like the makings of a "great and compelling science fiction story", the episode fails to realise the full potential of its idea. He viewed the plot as straightforward and "a bit flat", as well as "pretty hoary and cliched, [being] devoid of the kind of scintillating character interaction seen in both 'Exposed' and 'A Question of Priorities'." He noted that the episode shows nothing of how the aliens were able to build such a large underwater structure without SHADO's knowledge. He also questioned the aliens' motives regarding the doppelgangers, finding it strange that their plan "involves creating duplicates of human bodies, when human bodies are so desperately needed to keep the aliens alive." He concluded that the episode resembles more "a product of the swashbuckling and colourful 1960s – spies take out a dangerous alien underwater installation – than of a brooding 1970s meditation".

Ranking all 26 UFO episodes from worst to best, cult website The Anorak Zone placed "Reflections in the Water" 14th, calling it the series' "inevitable doppelganger episode". Although it praises Bishop's portrayal of Straker's "desperation", the review states that the episode fails to "add up to a great deal", criticising aspects of the production design and editing as well as the "appalling slow-fighting" in the dome scenes. The review notes that as the production "doesn't have the budget to present us with a single split screen, [...] we get the two highest-ranked members of SHADO improbably risking their lives without even the chance to confront 'themselves' on-screen." The review is also critical of the opening montage, which it calls a "jazz-funk clips package", arguing that it gives away too much of the plot.
