= Eve and the Handyman =

- Theatrical release poster
- Directed by: Russ Meyer
- Written by: Russ Meyer
- Produced by: Russ Meyer
- Starring: Eve Meyer; Anthony-James Ryan
- Cinematography: Russ Meyer
- Edited by: Russ Meyer
- Production company: Eve Productions
- Distributed by: Pad-Ram Enterprises
- Release date: May 5, 1961
- Running time: 65 minutes
- Country: United States
- Language: English

Eve and the Handyman is a 1961 American comedy film written and directed by Russ Meyer. The film stars Eve Meyer and Anthony-James Ryan. It was released on May 5, 1961, by Pad-Ram Enterprises.

It was Meyer's follow up to The Immoral Mr. Teas, which had been very successful.

== Plot ==
Eve is dressed in a long raincoat and follows the handyman around as he makes his appointed rounds. She watches as he has humorous run-ins while cleaning toilets, taking scrap metal to the dump, cleaning windows, delivering a tree, climbing poles, and remaining a gentleman while trying to help a topless hitchhiker. But why is she watching him so carefully?

== Cast ==
- Eve Meyer as Eve
- Anthony-James Ryan as the handyman
- Frank Bolger
- Iris Bristol
- Ken Parker
- Franklin H. Bolger as street sweeper
- Francesca Leslie as Francesca
- Florence E. Moore as restroom girl
- Jacqueline Stephens as nude model

== Production ==
The female lead, Eve Meyer, was Russ Meyer's wife. It was the only film of his she starred in although she was heavily involved behind the scenes on most of his early films. She did her own hair and make up and cooked for the crew. "I never worked so hard in my life," she said later.

The film's male lead, Anthony-James Ryan, was Russ Meyer's right hand man. The film was shot in San Francisco over a month in 1960. Ryan recalled, Eve typed the script, it wasn't even a script, just a list of ideas. That's all we had to work with. I improvised some of the stuff." Ryan also assisted in production.

Meyer says there was a crew of four: himself, his assistant, Eve Meyer and Ryan.

Ryan met his future wife, Jacqueline Stevens, while making the film. She played a nude model.

== Reception ==
=== Box office ===
According to Roger Ebert, the film grossed nearly a million dollars.

=== Critical ===
Variety wrote: "Eve and the Handyman is roughly the cinematic equivalent of one of the more sophisticated pose magazines. It is a slick slice of sex suggestion, an anatomical peepathon accompanied by that double-entendre narration that is the hallmark of caption poets from Dude to Nugget to Playboy. More often than not, the intended satire sinks into double talk, vulgarity and low comedy, but the film is evidence that, given more reputable channels in which to direct his skill, producer-director-writer-photographer Russ Meyer (of Mr. Teas notoriety), who is responsible for this glorified hormone stimulant, might prove he is more than a mere flesh-in-the-pan impresario. For its class, the picture is somewhat above average."

In Film Comment, Roger Ebert wrote "One of the most interesting scenes in the movie has Eve dancing in a low-cut dress while playing a pinball machine: the rhythm and cutting suggest sexual intercourse, and the scene has a nice balance between eroticism and humor. A frequent Meyer turnabout theme – the desirable woman who is rejected by the undesirable man – turns up in Eve in a hitchhiking scene. Unable to get a lift, Eve takes off one garment after another, still with no success."
