= A Clean Breast =

2000 three-volume autobiography by Russ Meyer

- Volume I
- Author: Russ Meyer
- Publisher: Self-published
- Publication date: 2000
- Media type: Print
- ISBN: 0-9621797-2-8
- Dewey Decimal: PN1998.3.M49

A Clean Breast is film director Russ Meyer's self-published three volume autobiography.

It is a 3-volume set of luxurious 100-lb paper stock, with sewn signatures and thousands of photos. It weights 18 pounds.

== Volumes ==
Volumes 1 and 2 provide the core of Russ Meyer's autobiography, beginning with his childhood and progressing to lengthy and fascinating recollections of his time during World War II as a combat cameraman for the 166th Signal Photo Company. He writes of risking his life and making lifelong friends as his unit traveled across Europe with George S. Patton. Meyer's World War II buddies are invoked often along with the world of independent filmmaking and his ribald life of women and sex.

Volume 3 is composed mainly of detailed retellings of Meyer's films, richly illustrated with countless sequential images presented in film frames. Volume 3 also brings the reader up to date on Meyer's latter-day video (and other) activities with Pandora Peaks.
