= Babette Bardot =

Swedish actress

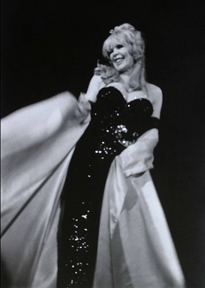
Bardot in 1968.

Babette Bardot (/bəˈbɛt bɑːrˈdoʊ/ bar-DOH; born 1940) is a Swedish actress who appeared in Russ Meyer's films, including Common Law Cabin and Mondo Topless.

After attracting attention for her roles in Russ Meyer's films, Babette Bardot began touring the United States in 1968 as a burlesque dancer under the guidance of her husband and manager, Bob Baker. With the seductive coif of platinum blonde hair and the billing caption "44-24-38 World's Most Sensational Exotic Entertainer" her appearances included the Gayety Theatre in New York, the Town Theatre in Chicago and the Colony Club in Dallas. While covering the burlesque circuit, she became a frequent guest on TV and radio programs, including The Wally Phillips Show (WGN-Chicago), The Steve Allen Show and The Phil Donahue Show.

She toured in a number of countries, and later found a home at the Majestic Inn (on MacLeod Trail and 50th Ave South) in Calgary, Alberta. The liberal stripping laws in Alberta allowed her to fully strip; however Babette would only remove her tops while retaining a thong. She was the headliner for the hotel bar, the Majic Stik, opening during the Calgary Exhibition and Stampede to a packed house nightly for six months before departing for Las Vegas.

Although unconfirmed, Babette claimed that she was a distant relative of Brigitte Bardot and had once modeled for Pablo Picasso while in her late teens. Author David K. Frasier denies relatives to Brigitte. During the Vietnam War, her popularity and public notoriety resulted in a photo insertion in the GI newspaper Stars and Stripes.

== Filmography ==
- Common Law Cabin (1967) — as Babette
- Mondo Topless (1966) — as Bouncy

== Footnotes ==
Bibliography

- McDonough, Jimmy (2006). Big Bosoms And Square Jaws: The Biography of Russ Meyer. Vintage UK. ISBN 0099464640.
- Frasier, David K. (1997). Russ Meyer-The Life and Films. McFarland. ISBN 978-0786404728.
