= Alaina Capri =

American actress

- Occupation: Actress
- Years active: 1957, 1967
- Known for: Angel Boland in Good Morning and... Goodbye!; Sheila Ross in Common Law Cabin

Alaina Capri is an actress who appeared in director Russ Meyer's films Common Law Cabin and Good Morning and... Goodbye!

== Early life and career ==
Capri grew up in Inglewood, California, and was named Miss Muscle Beach in 1956. At age 16, she was photographed by Russ Meyer after he saw her in the newspaper. Capri studied acting at UCLA and later became part of a female pop trio, the Loved Ones, under the direction of Oliver Berliner. She appeared in an uncredited walk-on part in the 1957 Jerry Lewis film, The Delicate Delinquent.

== Career with Russ Meyer ==
Prior to the Loved Ones leaving for an engagement in Japan, Berliner saw an ad seeking "buxom girls to put in a movie" and sent her picture to Meyer. Capri's first role with Meyer was Common Law Cabin (1967).

Capri's second and last film was Good Morning... and Goodbye! (1967). According to biographer Jimmy McDonough, Capri felt betrayed by Meyer after a scene she was told "alluded to nudity" showed more of her body than Capri was comfortable with. She told McDonough, "I was really upset. I never really talked to anybody on the set again."

== Life after Russ Meyer ==
Capri left show business after Good Morning... and Goodbye! to become a school teacher. She was terrified that someone would find out about her film career, and Meyer protected her anonymity. Capri was in attendance at Meyer's funeral in 2004.

== Filmography ==
Year	Title	Role
1957	The Delicate Delinquent	Uncredited
1967	Good Morning... and Goodbye!	Angel Boland
1967	Common Law Cabin	Sheila Ross
