= Lorna Maitland =

American film actress (born 1943)

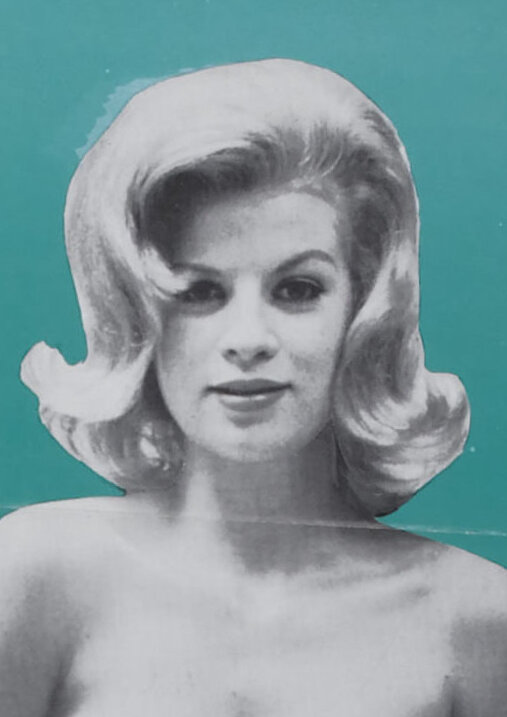
- Maitland on the poster for Lorna
- Born: November 19, 1943 (age 82)
- Occupations: Actress, model

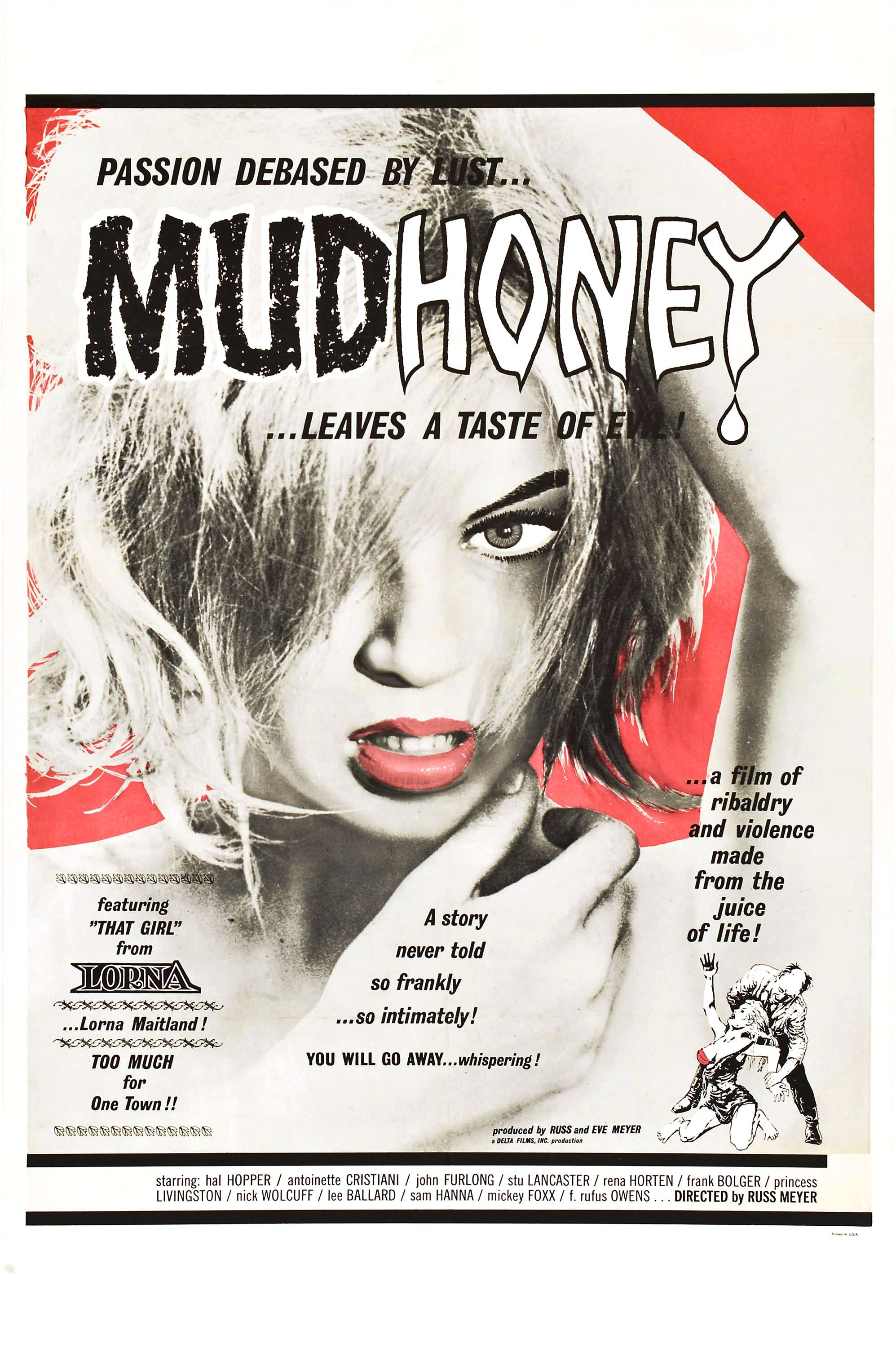
Poster for Mudhoney.

Lorna Maitland, born Barbara Ann Popejoy (November 19, 1943), is an American film actress. She appeared in three Russ Meyer films: Lorna (1964), Mudhoney (1965), and Mondo Topless (1966).

== Biography ==
Lorna Maitland was born in Glendale, Los Angeles County, California, on November 19, 1943.

== Filmography ==
=== Film ===
Year	Title	Notes
1964	Lorna	Lorna
1965	Mudhoney	Clara Belle
1966	Mondo Topless	Marla
1967	Hot Thrills and Warm Chills	Self
1967	Hip Hot and 21 by Dale Berry	Self

== Bibliography ==
- McDonough, Jimmy (2005). Big bosoms and square jaws: the biography of Russ Meyer, king of the sex film. London: Jonathan Cape. p. 132. ISBN 0-224-07250-1.
- Oakland Tribune, Doc Scortt...Actor-Printer, Sunday, March 1, 1964, Page 7-EL.
- Van Nuys Valley News, Valley West, September 11, 1964, Page 14.
