= Good Morning and... Goodbye! =

1967 film by Russ Meyer

- Directed by: Russ Meyer
- Written by: Russ Meyer; Jack Moran
- Starring: Alaina Capri
- Music by: Igo Kantor
- Release date: 1967
- Running time: 78 min.
- Country: United States
- Language: English

Good Morning and... Goodbye! is a 1967 American exploitation film directed by Russ Meyer. It features Alaina Capri, Karen Ciral, as well as Meyer regular Jack Moran, who co-wrote the script.

== Plot ==
In a country town, farmer Burt is married to the much younger Angel but cannot satisfy her sexually. Angel has an affair with a construction worker, Stone. Lana is Burt's 17 year old daughter to another woman. She tries to seduce Ray but he is more interested in Angel, so Lana winds up with Stone. Burt meets a sorceress in the forest who rejuvenates his sexual drive, leading him to be reunited with Angel. Lana winds up with Ray. Stone is beaten up by the husband of one of his earlier conquests.

== Cast ==
- Alaina Capri as Angel
- Stuart Lancaster as Burt
- Pat Wright as Stone
- Haji as The Catalyst
- Karen Ciral as Lana
- Don Johnson as Ray
- Tom Howland as Herb
- Megan Timothy as Lottie
- Toby Adler as Betty
- Sylvia Tedemar as Go-go dancer
- Cara Peters as Nude opening runner

== Production ==
The cast included regular Meyer actress, Haji, who recalled:

I did all my own costuming. I got up hours ahead of time to put those costumes together. I would just go out with a big bag and collect rose petals! I was late one morning for breakfast, and Russ -- he would sit at the head of the table -- he said, "Where were you?!" I shook the bag and said, "I was in the woods cutting down my costume!" I'd tape rose petals in my hair, on my breasts, and between my legs, and that would be my costume. I glued dead bugs on my cheeks and put green sticks and moss in my hair.

== Reception ==
The New York Times reviewed a Meyer film for the first time. It said Meyer "makes his points to the point of redundancy."

Roger Ebert later wrote that the film, along with Common Law Cabin, was "not among Meyer's best later work. The plots are too diffuse to maintain dramatic tension, the acting is indifferent, and there is an uncharacteristic amount of aimless dialogue. In retrospect, however, these films can be seen as Meyer's gradual disengagement from plot."

The ban of this film in Chicago was overruled.

== See also ==
- List of American films of 1967
