= Lorna (film) =

1964 film by Russ Meyer

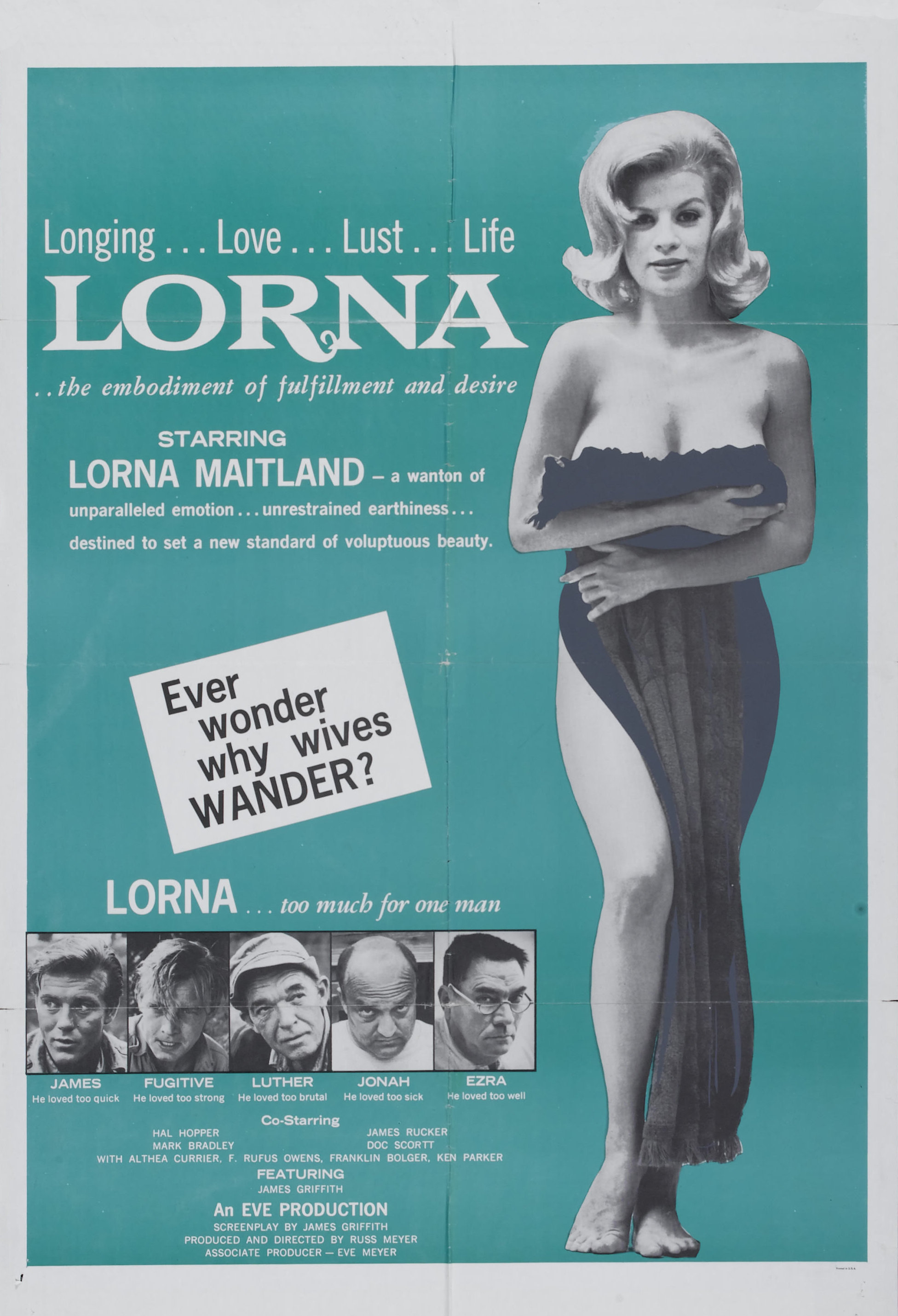
- Theatrical poster to Lorna (1964)
- Directed by: Russ Meyer
- Written by: James Griffith; Russ Meyer
- Produced by: Eve Meyer; Russ Meyer
- Starring: Lorna Maitland; Mark Bradley; James Rucker; Hal Hopper; Doc Scortt; Althea Currier; F. Rufus Owens; Frank Bolger; Ken Parker; James Griffith
- Cinematography: Russ Meyer
- Music by: Hal Hopper (title song); James Griffith (uncredited)
- Distributed by: Eve Productions Inc.
- Release date: September 11, 1964
- Running time: 78 minutes
- Country: United States
- Language: English
- Budget: $37,000

Lorna is a 1964 American independent film directed and produced by Russ Meyer and starring Lorna Maitland. It was written by James Griffith and Meyer.

Meyer describes the movie as "a brutal examination of the important realities of power, prophecy, freedom and justice in our society against a background of violence and lust, where simplicity is only a facade."

Lorna was the first of three films Meyer filmed featuring Lorna Maitland. Though still a low-budget, it was the most expensive film he had made to date, and was Meyer's first film in 35 mm.

The publicity to Lorna exclaimed: "Without artistic surrender, without compromise, without question or apology, an important motion picture was produced: LORNA—a woman too much for one man."

== Plot ==
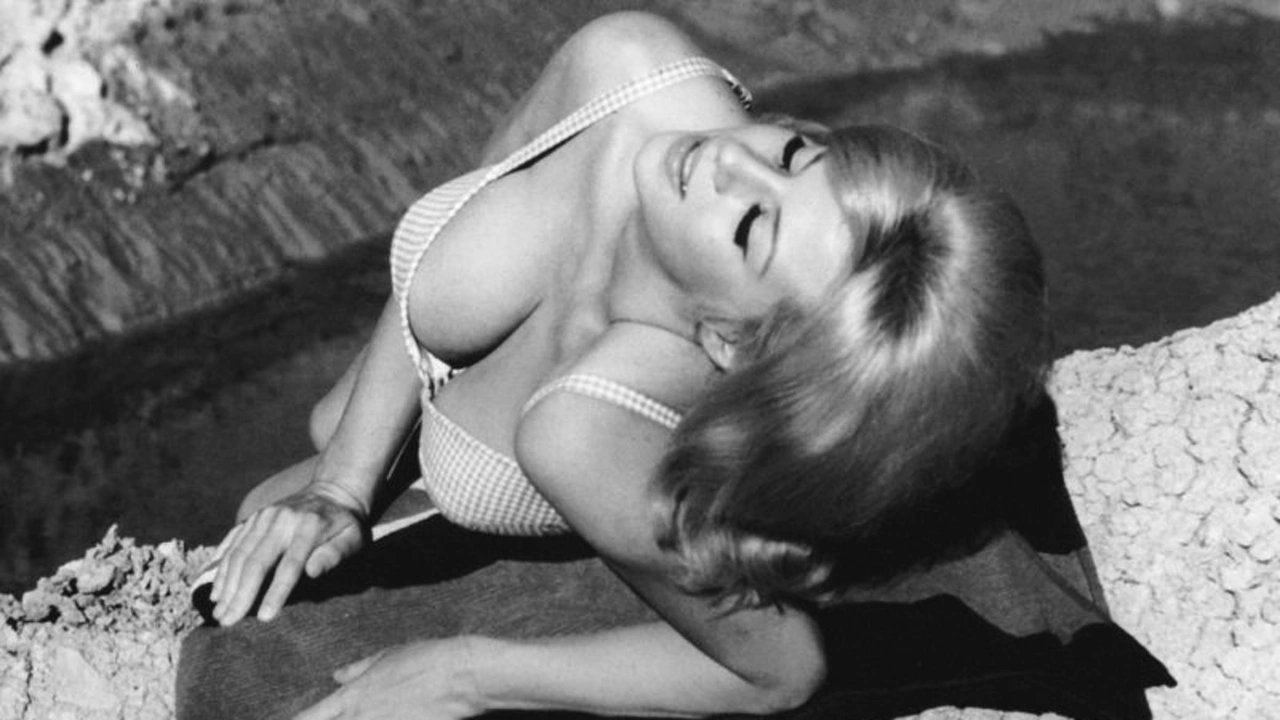
Lorna Maitland in a still from the film.

Lorna is a sexually unsatisfied young wife married to Jim, who works at a salt mine and spends his evenings studying to become a Certified Public Accountant. When Lorna goes for a nude swim in the river, she is raped by an escaped convict, but her frustrated sexuality is awakened. She invites the stranger to their home while Jim is at work.

Meanwhile, Jim's co-workers tease him about his wife's beauty and infidelity. Jim returns home early and discovers Lorna's unfaithfulness. The events take place on Jim and Lorna's anniversary, which Jim has forgotten.

== Cast ==
- Lorna Maitland as Lorna
- James Rucker as Jim
- Mark Bradley as fugitive
- Hal Hopper as Luther
- Doc Scortt as Jonah
- James Griffith as prophet/narrator
- Althea Currier

== Production ==
"That was breaking into what I call the quasi-foreign film," said Meyer later. "I wanted to make a Bitter Rice in America. A morality play! Good vs evil! The incredibly stacked Lorna Maitland, the innocent husband, the devil's advocate! She paid for her sins in the end by having an ice tong struck through that heaving chest."

Meyer had originally offered the lead role to Maria Andre, an actress who had been in his earlier Heavenly Bodies! (1963). However Meyer was unhappy with her breast size and continued to look for alternatives. Meyer's wife and business partner, Eve, discovered Barbara Ann Popejoy. She was cast and Meyer paid off Andre.

Meyer renamed Popejoy to "Lorna Maitland". She was pregnant during the shoot.

The film was shot in black and white over 10 days in September 1963, mainly on the small main street that runs through Locke, California.

In 1973 Meyer said at the time he made Lorna, "if I did a rape scene it struck me that it was terribly erotic and exciting. Today it would not strike me the same way. I would probably treat it in a much more ludicrous fashion, more outrageous. But then again, even then I was doing that, because I always had a woman raped in the most difficult circumstances, in a swamp, or in six feet of water, or out in a sand dune. I guess my jibes at sex have been just exactly that. I've looked upon sex in a kind of a humorous, outrageous way."

== Reception ==
=== Box-office ===
According to Roger Ebert, the film grossed almost a million dollars.

The film was prosecuted for obscenity in Maryland, Pennsylvania and Florida, but became a major success at drive-in, downtown theaters, and even made appearances at art-house cinemas.

== Critical Reception ==
Variety wrote: "Sex angles dominate a weak straying wife plot. Technically excellent but not quite out of the nudie theatre class. ... Miss Maitland has a sensual voice although vocal projection is her least asset. Bradley has rugged looks, a voice to match, and a bigger future in films. His role requires expressions of fear, boredom, tenderness and amoral viciousness, and he is up to them all. Rucker acts poorly. ... Meyer's direction is good, considering talent and script, while his lensing and editing are excellent."

Boxoffice wrote: "Producer-director Russ Meyer, who has ably enough demonstrated his ability to turn out modestly budgeted, mass-market, adult attractions in the past several years, now concerns himself with an adult topic that goes a step or two beyond the accepted theme of the undraped-female-cavorting on palm-fringed beaches; ... Acting values are more or less within the sphere-and-scope of time-tested melodrama tinged with strong sex angles. Meyers directorial prowess is sufficient for the genre indicated."

The Los Angeles Times said it was "afflicted with terrible taste and not a shred of talent anywhere."
