= Fanny Hill (1964 film) =

1964 film by Russ Meyer, Albert Zugsmith

- US film poster
- Directed by: Russ Meyer
- Written by: Robert Hill
- Based on: Fanny Hill by John Cleland
- Produced by: Albert Zugsmith; Artur Brauner
- Starring: Letícia Román; Miriam Hopkins; Walter Giller; Alex D'Arcy
- Cinematography: Heinz Hölscher
- Edited by: Alfred Srp
- Music by: Erwin Halletz
- Production companies: Famous Players Corporation; CCC Film
- Distributed by: Gloria Film (West Germany); Pan World (U.S.)
- Release dates: September 25, 1964 (West Germany); March 10, 1965 (U.S.)
- Running time: 104 minutes
- Countries: United States; West Germany
- Languages: English; German
- Box office: $1 million

Fanny Hill is a 1964 American-West German historical comedy film directed by Russ Meyer, and starring Letícia Román, Miriam Hopkins and Ulli Lommel. Filmed at the Spandau Studios in Berlin, the film is an adaptation of the 1748 John Cleland novel of the same name.

== Plot ==
Young, pretty and innocent Fanny Hill has lost her parents and must find her way in life amidst the perils of turbulent 18th-century London. She is lucky enough to quickly find a place as a waitress for the effusive Mrs. Brown. Mrs. Brown lives in a big house full of women in negligees and with very relaxed manners. She also insists that Fanny meet various gentlemen who show a fervent interest in Fanny.

== Cast ==
- Letícia Román as Fanny Hill
- Miriam Hopkins as Mrs. Brown
- Walter Giller as Hemmingway
- Ulli Lommel as Charles
- Chris Howland as Mr. Norbert
- Helmut Weiss as Mr. Dinklespieler
- Karin Evans as Martha
- Alexander D'Arcy as Admiral
- Christiane Schmidtmer as Fiona

== Production ==
Russ Meyer was hired to make the film by Albert Zugsmith. This was his first time directing a film without also being its producer. According to Roger Ebert, Meyer "found Zugsmith difficult to work with, the German backers of the film unreliable, and the shooting conditions all but impossible."

"The only thing that got me through at all," said Meyer, "was working with Miriam Hopkins, who was our star. The two of us pulled that picture through somehow. I told her once that it was remarkable how much she knew about making a picture, and she reminded me that, after all, she had once been married to Fritz Lang." (It was actually Anatole Litvak.)

While in Europe, Meyer made Europe in the Raw immediately afterwards.

== See also ==
- List of American films of 1964
