= Mindbender (UFO) =

- UFO episode
- Episode no.: Episode 23
- Directed by: Ken Turner
- Written by: Tony Barwick
- Editing by: Mike Campbell
- Production code: 25
- Original air date: 13 January 1971

Guest appearances
- Basil Dignam as Cabinet Minister (archive footage); Stuart Damon as Howard Byrne; Bud Tingwell as Captain Beaver James; Al Mancini as Lieutenant Andy Conroy; Craig Hunter as Lieutenant Dale; Steven Berkoff as Captain Steve Minto; Anouska Hempel as SHADO Operative; Suzanne Neve as Mary Rutland (archive footage); Barnaby Shaw as John Rutland (archive footage); Philip Madoc as Steven Rutland (archive footage); Stephan Chase as Film Director; Norton Clarke as 1st Assistant Director; Paul Greaves as 2nd Assistant Director; James Marcus as SHADO Operative; Stanley McGeagh as SHADO Guard; John Lyons as SHADO Guard; Larry Taylor as 1st Mexican Bandit; Ricardo Montez as 2nd Mexican Bandit; Bill Morgan as 3rd Mexican Bandit; Peter Halliday as Dr Segal (archive footage); Jack Silk as Motorcyclist (archive footage); Sylvia Anderson as Sylvia (uncredited)

Episode chronology
← Previous "The Psychobombs"	Next → "Reflections in the Water"

"Mindbender" is the 23rd episode of UFO, a 1970 British science fiction television series about an alien invasion of Earth. The screenplay was written by Tony Barwick and the director was Ken Turner. The episode was filmed from 30 June to 10 July 1970 and was first broadcast on 13 January 1971 on Associated Television. It was the 24th episode filmed.

The series was created by Gerry Anderson and Sylvia Anderson with Reg Hill, and produced by the Andersons and Lew Grade's Century 21 Productions for Grade's ITC Entertainment company.

== Plot ==
During a period of intense sunspot activity which leaves Moonbase and Earth vulnerable to alien attack, a UFO hugs the lunar surface in an apparent effort to strike at Moonbase. However, it suddenly veers away and self-destructs. Interceptor pilots Conroy and Dale are sent out to investigate; they find nothing to explain the alien craft's destruction but Conroy locates a curious diamond-like Moon rock, which he keeps as a souvenir.

However, when Conroy re-enters the Control Sphere on Moonbase, he hallucinates that there are three Mexican bandits there. He starts to fight the bandits, unaware that he is actually fighting Nina Barry and other Moonbase operatives. Barry sets off an alarm but Conroy shoots and kills Dale. A search is ordered and Conroy is killed in the ensuing gunfight.

Straker investigates Conroy's strange behaviour but can find nothing to explain it; the only connection Straker can make is that Conroy had an interest in the Old West and wrote Westerns in his spare time. Conroy's personal effects are returned to SHADO headquarters where they are sorted by Capt. "Beaver" James, a much admired retired astronaut. Upon touching Conroy's moon rock, James also falls under its control and believes that SHADO HQ has been invaded by aliens: he gains possession of a guard's gun and starts shooting everyone he sees. James is subsequently killed after taking Col. Lake hostage: tragically, James's gun was out of ammunition and had the guards known this, he could have been taken alive.

The moon rock is still on Straker's desk and he picks it up instead of the glass paperweight he usually holds from habit during discussions in his office. Straker gets into an argument with Henderson over funding but just as the situation becomes heated, a film director shouts 'Cut' and Straker finds himself as an actor on a set. Straker wanders the film sets, which include the Moonbase control desk and Skydiver's Command And Control Centre. He returns to the set representing his office and the argument with Henderson continues. But in the heat of the moment, he throws Conroy's moon rock against the wall, shattering it and eliminating its influence on him. Straker realises that the rock caused hallucinations in anyone who touched it and the UFO's destruction near Moonbase was in order to plant the rock on the surface.

== Regular cast ==
- Ed Bishop as Commander Ed Straker
- Michael Billington as Colonel Paul Foster
- Wanda Ventham as Colonel Virginia Lake
- Dolores Mantez as Lieutenant Nina Barry
- Gary Myers as Captain Lew Waterman
- Ayshea as Moonbase Operative
- Norma Ronald as Miss Ealand
- Grant Taylor as General James Henderson

== Production ==
The episode features scenes from two previous episodes: "Identified" and "A Question of Priorities". During the hallucinations suffered by Straker, the 'actors' use their real names when talking to each other. In the movie studio filming sequence, Sylvia Anderson has a cameo reading prompts and is referred to on screen by her first name. The scenes of Straker's hallucinations blur the barrier between the "reality" of the UFO universe and the viewer's reality, effectively breaking the fourth wall.

== Reception ==
John Kenneth Muir praised the episode, writing that it "works so well" both as a "literal narrative" about an alien trap, and as a metafiction about film and TV production. He interpreted the Wild West scenes as a homage to the cinematography and music of the Dollars Trilogy and other Spaghetti Westerns. Muir concluded that the episode "plays beautifully with form and anticipates our every reaction," adding that while self-reflexive television is often played for comedy, episodes like this "[make] us ask important questions about what is real life and what is fantasy."

Ranking "Mindbender" the fourth-best episode of UFO, review website anorakzone.com commented that the "odd, vaguely Prisoner-esque" story manages its "meta/fourth wall-breaking content [...] with a real sense of style." SFX magazine commented that a scene in which Straker sees his son's fatal accident (from "A Question of Priorities") being played as part of the metafictional studio's dailies has "real edge" and a "Prisoner-esque quality".
