= The Desperate Trail =

1994 film

- Directed by: P. J. Pesce
- Written by: P. J. Pesce; Tom Abrams
- Produced by: Brad Krevoy
- Starring: Sam Elliott; Craig Sheffer; Linda Fiorentino
- Cinematography: Michael Bonvillain
- Edited by: Bill Johnson
- Music by: Stephen Endelman
- Production company: Motion Picture Corporation of America
- Distributed by: Turner Home Entertainment
- Release date: December 28, 1994
- Running time: 93 minutes
- Country: United States
- Language: English

The Desperate Trail is a 1994 American Western film written and directed by P. J. Pesce and starring Sam Elliott, Craig Sheffer and Linda Fiorentino. It was originally shown on the TNT cable TV network.

== Plot ==
On a stagecoach in the old West, Marshal Bill Speakes is escorting his prisoner Sarah O'Rourke to her hanging. Also in the stage are Jack Cooper, Mamie Hollister, and her husband Zeb Hollister. The stage is attacked by three highwaymen. The stage runs over one, but the driver is killed by the leader and the stage takes off. The Marshal handcuffs Sarah to the stage and gains control of it, though one of the bandits climbs onto the back. Sarah grabs his gun and she and Speakes shoot him. When the Marshal finally shoots and kills the leader, Sarah then surprises the lawman and takes his gun. The strongbox is opened and Sarah prepares to take off with the cash, but Jack wrestles her gun away instead and runs off with the cash himself.

Jack heads to a nearby town and takes a prostitute up to his room. Later, Sarah arrives and gets the drop on him, escorting him to the lobby to get the money from the safe; however both are surprised by the Marshal and Mr. Hollister. In the midst of an ensuing shootout, Jack and Sarah escape.

Jack talks Sarah into a scheme to rob a bank. They get some cash from a poker game after Sarah shoots most of the other players. Meanwhile, Marshal Speakes gathers a posse and heads after them, catching up to them in a nearby town. During another shootout Jack is wounded, though he is rescued by Sarah; afterwards they ride off together. Hollister has been shot and is acting incoherently, so Speakes kills him, thereby showing his dark side.

As Jack and Sarah grow closer, she reveals that the person she was to be hanged for killing was actually the Marshal's son, who had beaten her. They travel to the ranch of Jack's brother, Walter. Jack and Sarah fight, and she takes off but is captured by the posse and taken to town for hanging. Walter spots her there and informs Jack. They come up with a plan to rescue her. Meanwhile, Marshal Speakes displays more cruelty by taunting Sarah mercilessly in her cell.

Jack goes to town and gets captured intentionally, whereupon he is put into jail with Sarah. Using chemicals given to him by Walter he breaks out of his cell, enabling the two of them to escape by hiding in a large crate in the shipping office. Walter then picks up the crate the next day and gets them back to the ranch.

Sometime later, while Jack and Sarah are out, the posse comes to the ranch and begins to torture Walter. Jack breaks in and shoots some of the posse. In a convoluted shootout, all of the posse except the Marshal are killed. Just as the lawman kills Walter and seriously wounds Jack, Sarah manages to distract him enough that Jack can fatally shoot him, with her hand helping him hold the gun. The movie ends with Jack and Sarah riding off together into the sunset.

== Cast ==
- Sam Elliott as Marshall Bill Speakes
- Craig Sheffer as Jack Cooper
- Linda Fiorentino as Sarah O'Rourke
- Frank Whaley as Walter Cooper
- John Furlong as Zeb Hollister
- Robin Westphal as Mamie Hollister
- Boots Southerland as Scar Face Leader
- Joey Hamlin as Laughing Boy Killer
- Danny O'Haco as "Happy"
- Bradley Whitford as Tommy Donnelly
- Jill Scott Momaday as Janie
- P. J. Pesce as Scared Mustachioed Cowboy
