= Finders Keepers, Lovers Weepers! =

1968 film by Russ Meyer

- Theatrical poster to Finders Keepers, Lovers Weepers! (1968)
- Directed by: Russ Meyer
- Written by: Russ Meyer (story); Richard Zachary
- Produced by: Eve Meyer; Russ Meyer; Anthony-James Ryan
- Starring: Anne Chapman; Paul Lockwood; Gordon Westcourt; Duncan McLeod; Robert Rudelson; Lavelle Roby; Jan Sinclair; Joey DuPrez; Nick Wolcuff; Pamela Collins; Vickie Roberts; John Furlong; Michael Roberts
- Cinematography: Russ Meyer
- Edited by: Richard S. Brummer; Russ Meyer
- Music by: Igo Kantor
- Distributed by: Eve Productions Inc.
- Release date: May 8, 1968
- Running time: 71 min.
- Language: English

Finders Keepers, Lovers Weepers! is a 1968 film by Russ Meyer. The story involves the goings-on at a topless go-go bar on the Sunset Strip. Meyer himself makes an appearance in this film. The composition Finlandia by Jean Sibelius is used in one of the film's love scenes.

== Plot ==
Paul, the owner of a strip club bar on the Sunset Strip in Los Angeles, is taken home after being knocked out at a brothel, whose madam sends two thieves to Paul's club to rob the place while he is unconscious.

When the star dancer at the bar quits, Paul's wife Kelly fills in for her. The bartender Ray then seduces her and takes her to his home, and the thieves Cal and Feeny begin working on cracking the safe. When Paul comes to and cannot find his wife at home, he goes to the club, where the thieves are engaged in their work.

Paul manages to kill one of the two robbers, Feeny, before Claire herself has been killed but not before she shoots and kills the other robber, Cal, and after Ray has been seriously wounded by a knife thrown by Cal.

== Cast ==
- Anne Chapman as Kelly
- Paul Lockwood as Paul
- Gordon Wescourt as Ray
- Duncan McLeod as Cal
- Robert Rudelson as Feeny
- Lavelle Roby as Claire
- Jan Sinclair as Christiana
- Joey Duprez as Joy
- Pam Collins as 1st Dancer
- John Furlong as Customer
- Nick Wolcuff as Nick
- Vickie Roberts as Girl
- Michael Roberts as Boy

== Reception ==
The Los Angeles Times said the film was "not much different from his [Meyer's] previous efforts... Meyer has trouble keeping abreast, so to speak, of the times. This is because Meyer has such a clean mind for a man who makes dirty movies... his films seem positively healthy alongside much of the current Hollywood and European product."

The New York Times thought the film was "no longer particularly erotic."
