= Tank Commando =

- Film poster by Albert Kallis
- Directed by: Burt Topper
- Written by: Burt Topper
- Produced by: Burt Topper
- Music by: Ronald Stein
- Distributed by: American International Pictures
- Release date: 1959
- Country: United States
- Language: English

Tank Commando is a 1959 American war film produced, directed and written by Burt Topper. American International Pictures released the film as a double feature with Operation Dames.

== Premise ==
During the Italian campaign, the United States Army sends out a demolition team to discover how the Germans are reinforcing their positions. The team is led to its destination by an Italian boy.

== Cast ==
- Donato Farretta ... Diano
- Robert Barron ... Lt. Jim Blaine
- Maggie Lawrence ... Jean, the nurse
- Wally Campo ... Pvt. Sonny Lazzotti
- Jack B. Sowards ... Pvt. Todd
- Leo V. Matranga ... Shorty
- Anthony Rich ... Sands, a soldier
- Larry Hudson ... Capt. Praxton
- Maria Monay ... Italian Woman
- Carmen D'Antonio ... Teresa (segment "Tessie")
- David Addis ... Clifton, a soldier
- Russ Prescott ... Taylor, a soldier
- Freddie Roberto ... captured Italian traitor
- Jerry Lear ... Bartender
- Fred Gavlin ... German soldier
- Joan Connors ... prostitute
- Larry Shuttleworth ... a Sergeant
- Lee Redman ... a G.I.

Uncredited

- Norberto Kerner ... German soldier
- Dan Pelter ... Stritch

== Production ==
- Co-Producer ... Samuel Z Arkoff
- Co-Producer ... James H Nicholson
- Writer, Director and Producer ... Burt Topper
- Musical Director ... Ronald Stein
- Cinematography ... John M Nikolaus Jr.
- Film Editor ... Asa Boyd Clark
- Art Director ... Daniel Haller
- Makeup Artist ... Bob Mark
- Production Manager ... Willard Kirkham
- Second Unit and Assistant Director ... Richard M Rubin
- Sound Mixer ... Al Overton
- Sound Effects ... Josef von Stroheim -
- Electrician ... Lee Cannon
- Head Grip ... Charles Hannawalt
- Cameraman ... Kay Norton
- Wardrobe ... Gene Martin
- Supervising Film Editor ... Ronald Sinclair
- Assistant Editor ... Paul Wittenberg
- Musical Lyrics ... Ronald Stein
- Script Supervisor ... Joe Franklin
- Dialogue Director ... Don Laffer
