= Operation Dames =

1959 film by Louis Clyde Stoumen

- Film poster by Albert Kallis
- Directed by: Louis Clyde Stoumen
- Starring: Eve Meyer; Chuck Henderson
- Distributed by: American International Pictures
- Release date: 1959
- Country: United States
- Language: English

Operation Dames is a 1959 Korean War film directed by Louis Clyde Stoumen and starring Eve Meyer. American International Pictures released the film in the United States as a double feature with Tank Commandos. It was retitled Girls in Action for release in the Commonwealth of Nations countries, possibly to avoid a connection with the honorific title dame.

== Plot ==
A band of USO entertainers is trapped behind enemy lines in Korea in 1950. They include singer Lorry Evering, who, after being attacked, attracts the interest of an army sergeant who attempts to guide the group of civilians to safety.

== Cast ==
- Eve Meyer as Lorry
- Chuck Henderson as Jeff
- Don Devlin as Tony
- Ed Craig as Hal
- Chuck Van Haren as Billy
- Cindy Girard as Roberta
- Barbara Skyler as Marsha
- Andrew Mitchell Monro as Dinny

== See also ==
- List of American films of 1959
