= Kiss Me Quick! =

1964 film by Peter Perry

- DVD cover
- Directed by: Peter Perry
- Written by: Bethel Buckalew
- Produced by: Max Gardens; Harry H. Novak
- Starring: Frank A. Coe; Max Gardens; Althea Currier
- Cinematography: László Kovács
- Distributed by: Boxoffice International Pictures
- Release date: December 25, 1964
- Running time: 70 minutes
- Country: United States
- Language: English

Kiss Me Quick! is a 1964 American comedy horror film directed by Peter Perry. The film was originally titled Dr Breedlove or How I Learned to Stop Worrying and Love (or, more simply, Dr Breedlove) to exploit the title of Stanley Kubrick's Dr Strangelove. It was retitled to exploit Billy Wilder's Kiss Me, Stupid.

In the film, an alien visits the planet Earth in search for the perfect woman. She is to be used as the progenitor of a new race of slaves. A mad scientist offers several potential women to the alien.

== Plot ==
The plot involves an alien, Sterilox, from the "Buttless" galaxy, being sent to Earth in order to find the perfect woman who will be used to create a race of servants.

Sterilox is teleported into the lab of a mad scientist by the name of Dr. Breedlove, who offers Sterilox a number of beautiful women to choose from. The film includes a dance number where three of Breedlove's women gyrate to rock music.

== Cast ==
- Frank A. Coe as Sterilox/Frankenstein Monster (as Fattie Beltbuckle)
- Max Gardens as Dr. Breedlove (as Manny Goodtime)
- Althea Currier as Gertie Tassle (as Althea)
- Natasha as Boobra
- Jackie De Witt as Kissme (as Jackie)
- Claudia Banks as Hotty Totty (as Claudiea)
- Bibi as Barebra
- Donna as Gigi String
- Pat Hall as Gina Catchafanni (as Pat V)
- Lucky as Lotta Cash
