= Europe in the Raw =

- Theatrical release poster
- Directed by: Russ Meyer
- Written by: Russ Meyer
- Produced by: Russ Meyer
- Starring: Veronique Gabriel; Gigi La Touche; Abundavita; Denise Du Vall; Heide Richter; Yvette Le Grand
- Cinematography: Russ Meyer
- Edited by: Russ Meyer
- Music by: Marlin Skiles
- Distributed by: Eve Productions
- Release date: March 28, 1963
- Running time: 72 minutes
- Country: United States
- Language: English

Europe in the Raw is a 1963 American documentary film written and directed by Russ Meyer. It was released on March 28, 1963.

== Cast ==
- Veronique Gabriel
- Gigi La Touche
- Abundavita
- Denise Du Vall
- Heide Richter
- Yvette Le Grand
- Greta Thorwald
- Shawn Devereaux
- Franklin L. Thistle

== Production ==
Meyer shot the film in Europe after completing production of Fanny Hill (1964). According to Roger Ebert, Meyer "concealed a 16-mm camera in a suitcase and got footage in the red-light districts of Paris, Amsterdam and elsewhere." Meyer later felt the suitcase camera was unhandy and difficult to use, and that he would not recommend making a film in that way again."

== Reception ==
Boxoffice wrote: "Enterprising producer-director-cameraman Russ Meyer, trekking along the highways and byways of Europe, comes up with entertainment that can be aggressively, imaginatively sold to the male crowd. ... This is not, by any stretch of the imagination, to be recommended for the naive, gullible and impressionable. It's strictly adult entertainment and best to be played off in the larger cities. The smaller communities, by tradition, seem to frown on such screen presentations, and where the local showman feels antagonism will be registered against his theatre and the film industry, it might well be a good idea to screen the attraction for reigning authorities. Meyer is not a novice; he has a keen awareness of what will register on the screen."

== See also ==
- List of American films of 1963
