= Anouska Hempel =

New Zealand hotelier, designer and actress (born 1941)

Anouska Hempel Lady Weinberg
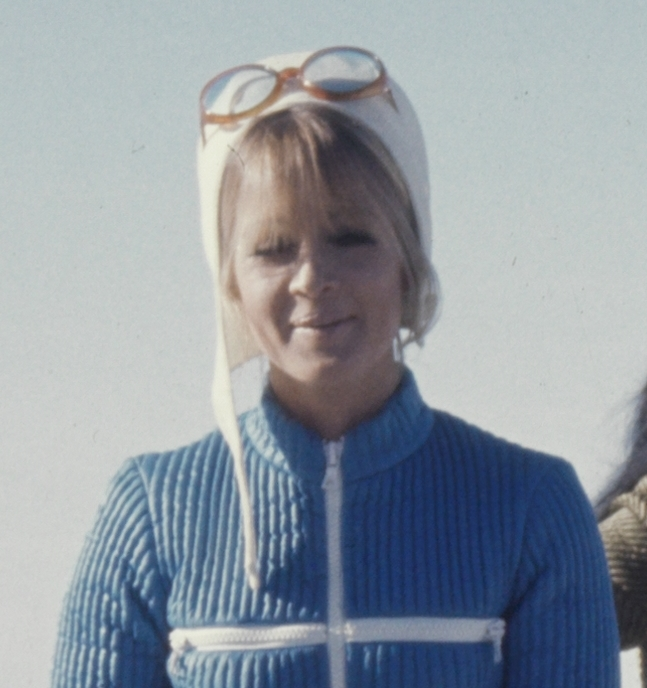
- Hempel in On Her Majesty's Secret Service (1969)
- Born: Ann Geissler; Wellington, New Zealand
- Other name: Anoushka Hempel
- Citizenship: British
- Education: Sutherland High School, New South Wales, Australia
- Occupations: Hotelier and designer Former actress
- Years active: 1963 to present
- Known for: Designing Blakes Hotel and the Hempel Hotel
- Style: Modern minimalism
- Spouse(s): Constantine Hempel (widowed) Bill Kenwright (m. 1978–1980) (divorced); Sir Mark Weinberg (m. 1980)
- Children: 3

Anouska Hempel, Lady Weinberg is a New Zealand-born film and television actress who later became a hotelier and interior designer. She is sometimes credited as Anoushka Hempel.

== Early life ==
Hempel was born Ann Geissler and is of Russian and Swiss German ancestry. She has speculated that she was born on a boat en route from Papua New Guinea to New Zealand. However, her place of birth is recorded as Wellington, New Zealand, where her emigrant family settled.

They later moved to Cronulla, south of Sydney in Australia, where her father owned a garage. As a teenager in the mid-1950s, Hempel attended Sutherland High School. In 1962, she moved to England carrying only £10.

== Acting ==
Hempel's first film appearance was in Kiss of the Vampire (1963). In 1969 she appeared in the James Bond film On Her Majesty's Secret Service as one of the "angels of death". Thereafter, she appeared in several films, including Scars of Dracula (1970), The Magnificent Seven Deadly Sins (1971), Go for a Take (1972), Tiffany Jones (1973), Russ Meyer's controversial Black Snake (1973), Double Exposure (1977), and Lady Oscar (1979).

In the 1970s, Hempel appeared in one episode of the BBC series The Lotus Eaters. She appeared in the science-fiction TV series UFO ("Mindbender", 1970) and Space: 1999 ("The Metamorph", 1976). Hempel played the female lead in the ITV mini-series Zodiac (1974). During her career as an actress, she appeared as a regular panellist alongside Patrick Mower for two series of the murder mystery game show Whodunnit?, between 1975 and 1976, and as a guest on "Call My Bluff" in 1979.

=== Partial filmography ===
- On Her Majesty's Secret Service (1969) – Australian girl
- The Breaking of Bumbo (1970) – debutante
- Scars of Dracula (1970) – Tania
- UFO (1970) – Tamara Paulson
- The Magnificent Seven Deadly Sins (1971) – blonde (segment "Lust")
- Carry On at Your Convenience (1971) – new canteen girl (uncredited)
- Go for a Take (1972) – Suzi Eckmann
- Black Snake (1973) – Lady Susan Walker
- Tiffany Jones (1973) – Tiffany Jones
- The Doll (1975) – Phyllis Du Salle (three episodes)
- Lady Oscar (1979) – Jeanne Vallois / Jeanne de la Motte

== Hotels and design ==
After finishing acting, Hempel embarked on a career as a hotelier and interior designer. In 2002, she was ranked by Architectural Digest as one of the top 100 interior designers and architects in the world.

Hempel established four hotels. Blakes Hotel was created in 1978 as one of the world's first luxury boutique hotels. Based in South Kensington, it is well known for its design, quality of service and privacy. The hotel's restaurant has become a destination in its own right, featuring a fusion of Hempel's favourite cuisines of Japanese and Italian. Her second hotel, the Hempel Hotel, was noted as a minimalist hotel. Blakes Amsterdam was opened in 1999, drawing inspiration from Amsterdam's historic Dutch East India Company.

== Personal life ==
In 1964, she married Constantine Hempel, a son of Eduard Hempel, with whom she had a son and daughter. He was a journalist and property developer who was killed in 1973, crashing his car into a basement in Pimlico.

She and her second husband, theatrical producer Bill Kenwright (1945–2023), divorced after two years of marriage in 1980. Later that same year, Hempel married financier Mark Weinberg, with whom she has a son. Upon her husband's knighthood, she acquired the title Lady Weinberg. She appears in a photographic portrait by Bryan Wharton on display in the National Portrait Gallery.
