= Mudhoney (film) =

1965 film by Russ Meyer

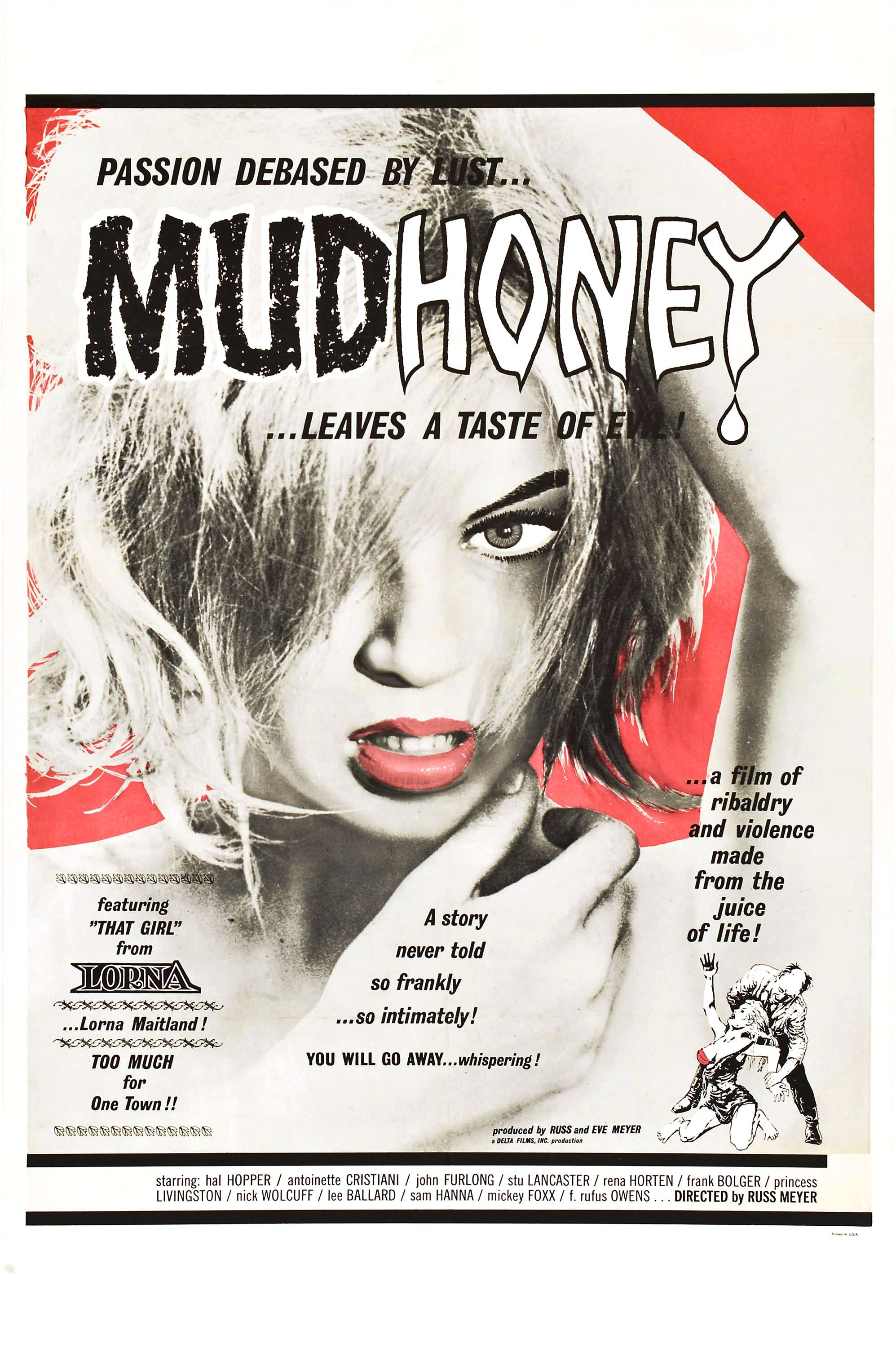
- Theatrical release poster
- Directed by: Russ Meyer
- Written by: W.E. Sprague; Raymond Friday Locke
- Based on: Streets Paved with Gold by Raymond Friday Locke
- Produced by: George Costello; Eve Meyer; Russ Meyer
- Starring: Hal Hopper; Antoinette Cristiani; John Furlong; Rena Horten; Princess Livingston; Lorna Maitland; Sam Hanna; Stuart Lancaster
- Cinematography: Walter Schenk
- Edited by: Russ Meyer; Charles G. Schelling
- Music by: Henri Price
- Distributed by: Eve Productions Inc.
- Release dates: May 25, 1965 (Boston); August 6, 1965 (Los Angeles)
- Running time: 92 minutes
- Country: United States
- Language: English

Mudhoney (sometimes Mud Honey) is a 1965 Southern Gothic film directed by Russ Meyer. It is based on the novel Streets Paved With Gold (1958) by Raymond Friday Locke. The film is a period drama set during the Great Depression. "I got in a little bit over my head," Meyer said about the film. "That's when I thought I was Erskine Caldwell, John Steinbeck and George Stevens all in one."

The film became the inspiration for the name of pioneering Seattle grunge band Mudhoney, formed in 1988. American singer-songwriter Norah Jones' album cover for Little Broken Hearts was based upon a poster for the film.

== Plot ==
In this Depression-era tale, Calef McKinney is traveling from Michigan to California and stops in Spooner, Missouri, where Lute Wade hires him for odd jobs.

McKinney gets involved with Wade's niece, Hannah Brenshaw. But she is married to Sidney, a wife-beating drunk who hopes to inherit his uncle-in-law's money.

Sidney and an eccentric preacher named Brother Hanson plot against McKinney, who finds it difficult to conceal his mysterious past and his growing affection for Sidney's wife.

Sidney winds up burning his farm and attempting to frame McKinney. He rapes and murders the preacher's wife and is killed by the lynch mob.

== Cast ==
- Hal Hopper as Sidney Brenshaw
- Antoinette Cristiani as Hannah Brenshaw
- John Furlong as Calif McKinney
- Stuart Lancaster as Lute Wade
- Rena Horten as Eula
- Princess Livingston as Maggie Marie
- Lorna Maitland as Clara Belle
- Sam Hanna as Injoys
- Nick Wolcuff as Sheriff Abel
- Frank Bolger as Brother Hanson
- Lee Ballard as Sister Hanson
- Mickey Foxx as Thurmond Pate
- F. Rufus Owens as Milton

== Production ==
The film was based on a novel, Streets Paved with Gold by Friday Locke.

== Reception ==
=== Box office ===
The film was a financial failure. Meyer later said, "I made a gamble with Mudhoney and I failed. The only reason I made Mudhoney was I was in love with a girl named Rena. I should have not made the film."

=== Critical ===
The Los Angeles Times called it "the perfect dirty picture. Unspoiled by either undue sadism or outright nudity... a flawless piece of unintentional camp."

Roger Ebert called the film "Meyer's neglected masterpiece: his most interesting, most ambitious, most complex and longest independent production. He describes it as a case of over-achievement; it was not necessary, or perhaps even wise, he believes, to expend so much energy on a movie that had so little directly exploitable elements." Ebert said "Meyer's visual invention, always dramatic and energetic, has never been better than in this one. From the Hitchcockian opening (bare feet seen in a closeup on intersecting passages) to such Grand Guignol shots as a body falling into a grave from the grave's P. O. V., this is a melodrama taken to obsessed extremes."

== See also ==
- List of American films of 1965
