= John Furlong (actor) =

American actor (1933–2008)

- Born: John Thomas Furlong; April 14, 1933; Albany, New York; United States
- Died: June 23, 2008 (aged 75); Nashville, Tennessee; United States
- Occupations: Film, television actor

John Furlong (April 14, 1933 – June 23, 2008) was an American actor. He dubbed the voice of Russ Meyer in all of Meyer's film appearances.

== Filmography ==
- Mudhoney (1965) - Calif McKinney
- Faster, Pussycat! Kill! Kill! (1965) - Narrator (voice, uncredited)
- How Much Loving Does a Normal Couple Need? (1967) - Dr. Martin Ross
- Finders Keepers, Lovers Weepers! (1968) - Customer
- Vixen! (1968) - Sam the Gas Station Attendant
- Blazing Saddles (1974) - Tourist Man (uncredited)
- Busting (1974) - Policeman
- The Gravy Train (1974) - Second Passenger
- Airport 1975 (1974) - Mr. Taylor - Passenger (uncredited)
- The Front Page (1974) - Duffy
- Adam-12 (11/19/74) as Bar Comic
- Supervixens (1975) - CBS Commentator (voice)
- Hustle (1975) - Waiter
- W.C. Fields and Me (1976) - Reporter (uncredited)
- All the President's Men (1976) - News Desk Editor
- The Gumball Rally (1976) - Man on Freeway
- Doc Hooker's Bunch (1976) - Blake
- One on One (1977) - Cop
- The Swarm (1978) - Cameraman
- Bloodbrothers (1978) - Banion's Bar Man #3
- Beneath the Valley of the Ultra-Vixens (1979) - The Director / Radio Announcer (voice, uncredited)
- The Postman Always Rings Twice (1981) - Sign Man #2
- Jagged Edge (1985) - Butler
- Odd Jobs (1986) - Readmont Owner
- The Trouble with Spies (1987) - First Russian
- Suburban Commando (1991) - Official
- Wyatt Earp (1994) - Clem Hafford
- The Desperate Trail (1994) - Zeb Hollister
- The Man Next Door (1997) - George
- Vampires (1998) - Father Joseph Molina
- The Theory of the Leisure Class (2001) - Emmet Masterson
- Maniacts (2001) - Prometheus J. Boley (final film role)
