= Mondo Topless =

- Poster to Mondo Topless
- Directed by: Russ Meyer
- Produced by: Russ Meyer
- Starring: Babette Bardot; Pat Barrington; Darlene Gray
- Narrated by: John Furlong
- Cinematography: Russ Meyer
- Edited by: Russ Meyer
- Music by: The Aladdins
- Distributed by: Eve Productions
- Release date: November 17, 1966
- Running time: 60 minutes
- Country: United States
- Language: English

Mondo Topless is a 1966 pseudo-documentary directed by Russ Meyer, featuring Babette Bardot and Lorna Maitland among others. It marked Meyer's return to color filmmaking following a two-year "Gothic period" of black-and-white "roughies" (most notably Faster, Pussycat! Kill! Kill! [1965]) that were primarily marketed toward the drive-in theater circuit and deemphasized nudity and other sexual content in favor of exaggerated violence. While a straightforward sexploitation film, the film owes some debt to the French New Wave and cinéma vérité traditions, and is known to some under the titles Mondo Girls and Mondo Top.

Its tagline: "Two Much For One Man...Russ Meyer's Busty Buxotic Beauties ... Titilating ... Torrid ... Untopable ... Too Much For One Man!"

The film was banned in Finland.

== Plot ==
The film presents a snapshot of mid-1960s San Francisco before shifting its focus to strippers, particularly in the context of the city's incipient topless go-go dancing craze. (This seminal manifestation of the Sexual Revolution of the 1960s attenuated the coquettish tableaux and swing-underpinned élan of American burlesque-era striptease and its immediate derivations in favor of a pruriently libidinous style informed by musical trends; at this juncture, dancers generally remained partially clothed below the waist, although this would evolve in subsequent decades.) The strippers' lives are earnestly portrayed as they reveal the day-to-day realities of sex work, ruminate over their respective bra sizes and articulate their preferences in men, all voiced over while dancing topless to an instrumental surf-style soundtrack. Throughout the film, the narrator talks about the performers as if their "topless movement" is a subculture of the broader counterculture of the 1960s, somewhat tangential to the unbridled cultural transmogrifications of the beatnik and hippie movements of the epoch.

== Cast ==
- Babette Bardot as Bouncy
- Pat Barrington as Herself (as Pat Barringer)
- Sin Lenee as Lucious
- Darlene Gray as Buxotic
- Diane Young as Yummy
- Darla Paris as Delicious
- Donna X as Xciting
- Veronique Gabriel as Herself (Europe in the Raw footage)
- Greta Thorwald as Herself (Europe in the Raw footage)
- Denice Duval as Herself (Europe in the Raw footage)
- Abundavita as Herself (Europe in the Raw footage)
- Heide Richter as Herself (Europe in the Raw footage)
- Gigi La Touche as Herself (Europe in the Raw footage)
- Yvette Le Grand as Herself (Europe in the Raw footage)
- Lorna Maitland as Herself (Lorna screentest footage)

== Production ==
Meyer made the film after his "gothic period" - four dramatic movies he did in black and white, starting with Lorna and going through to Faster, Pussycat! Kill! Kill!. It was shot to cash in on the San Francisco "topless boom" of the 1960s.

== Documentary traditions ==
The title Mondo Topless derives from the series of "mondo" films of the early 1960s. The first and most successful of these was Mondo Cane (A Dog's World). The purpose of these films was to bypass censorship laws by presenting both sexual and graphically violent material in a documentary format.

Mondo Topless shares some stylistic similarities with Jean-Luc Godard's collaborative effort, Le plus vieux métier du monde (The Oldest Trade in the World). Mondo Topless, like most other Meyer films, drew much of its inspiration from the more relaxed European attitudes toward sex, and was followed by a host of imitators.

== Reception ==
Author Jimmy McDonogh later wrote, "How is this movie to be taken? An intense magnification of a completely negative sexual mythology? Or only a frenetic drone, an unrelenting meditation on nothingness best put into words by Pat Barringer, the dancer on the electrical tower: 'All that you're doing is a dance it has no meaning whatsoever...'"

Roger Ebert wrote Mondo Topless "is in some ways quite an interesting film, especially for the light it sheds on Meyer's attitude to his big-busted actresses" which mostly features "topless dancers in incongruous situations... The film's real interest is in its sound track, which consists of tape-recorded interviews with the dancers. They talk about the hazards and advantages of having large bosoms. There seems to be something subtly sadistic going on here; Meyer is simultaneously photographing the girls because of their dimensions, and recording them as they complain about their problems ('I have to have my bras custom-made'). This sets up a kind of psychological Mobius strip, and the encounter between the visuals and the words in Mondo Topless creates the kind of documentary tension Larry Rivers was going for in Tits."

Filmink noted the film "intersperses a LOT of footage of topless dancing with surprisingly interesting first-person accounts of their work and life and makes one wish Meyer had made more documentaries in his career."

Police raided a cinema in Cincinnati where the film was being screened.
