= The Immoral Mr. Teas =

1959 film by Russ Meyer

- Theatrical poster to The Immoral Mr. Teas
- Directed by: Russ Meyer
- Written by: Russ Meyer
- Produced by: Peter A. DeCenzie
- Starring: Bill Teas; Ann Peters; Marilyn Wesley
- Cinematography: Russ Meyer
- Edited by: Russ Meyer; John F. Link Sr. (uncredited)
- Music by: Edward J. Lakso
- Color process: Eastmanicolor
- Distributed by: Pad-Ram Enterprises
- Release date: May 22, 1959
- Running time: 63 minutes
- Country: United States
- Language: English
- Budget: $24,000
- Box office: $1.5 million

The Immoral Mr. Teas is the first commercially successful film of director Russ Meyer, released in 1959. The film was described as a nudist comedy, and was noted for exhibiting extensive female nudity. The film cost $24,000 to produce, and eventually grossed more than $1.5 million on the independent/exploitation circuit.

== Plot ==
The only sound in the film is the voice of a narrator and a very monotonic musical theme.

Mr. Teas is a door-to-door salesman for dentist appliances who makes deliveries on his bicycle. Teas is a clumsy and shy man, who likes to watch happy couples, and who daydreams when looking down the necklines of women he meets. The only way that he is able to have sex is with a prostitute. After undergoing surgery at the dentist, Teas realizes that the anesthetic has overcome his inhibitions, and given him x-ray vision, enabling him to see all women without their clothes. He is happy at first, but gradually begins to be embarrassed. For example, he goes to the river, and sees three women swimming, and he sees them as naked. The three women are those he sees daily: the dental nurse, a secretary, and a waitress in the bar. Teas decides to go to a psychoanalyst, and he also sees her naked. The voiceover says: "On the other hand, some men are happy to be sick."

== Cast ==
- Bill Teas as Mr Teas
- Ann Peters
- Marily Wesley
- Mischele Roberts
- Dawn Danielle
- Russ Meyer as Man in burlesque audience

== Background ==
Before this film was released, the only moving pictures exhibiting extensive nudity were either underground (covertly produced and distributed) pornographic films, typically distributed "under the counter" in 16 mm black and white movies, or naturist pictures, openly displayed in specialized movie theaters, usually under the cover of exhibiting the fun and freedom of nudism in naturist reserves.

Russ Meyer was approached to make a "nudie" film by burlesque impresario Pete De Cenzie, who was interested in making an American version of the nudist camp films then coming in from Europe. Meyer agreed provided he could do something with a scriptline and that he could use "well built girls instead of the usual unattractive types that populated nudist films."

He hired his friend Bill Teas. "I had no idea when we started," he said. "All I had was Teas, three girls and my dentist and my attorney for assistants."

Meyer says his dentist agreed to let his office be used on the weekend for filming. The script was made up as they went along and the voice over narration was added later.

Meyer said he shot the film in four days "I knew exactly how it was going to begin, I knew how it would be in the middle, I knew how it would be at the end. I based it on my experiences doing stills for Playboy. There's a lot of stuff on the girl next door, the common man, the voyeur - little nude photo essays."

== Nudity ==
The Immoral Mr. Teas was the first American "above ground" movie since the pre-Code, early sound era to show female nudity without the pretext of naturism. It is considered to be the first commercially viable American "skin flick", and popularized the nudie cutie genre.

In a 1960 Philadelphia court case, the film was held not to be obscene, although the judge described the film as "vulgar, pointless and in bad taste".

The movie consists of a series of short scenes. In a sense, no one is actually naked; the only nudity seen is through the viewpoint and vivid imagination of Mr. Teas. Mr. Teas's mental constructions extend beyond the nudity (always exclusively of female characters) – there is an underlying surrealism in Mr. Teas's imagination, which results in a number of genuinely bizarre situations.

== A typical scene ==
Mr. Teas attends an appointment with his dentist, who must perform an extraction of a molar. The dentist has an assistant (Marilyn Wesley), who is stunningly beautiful, and not-quite modestly dressed. The application of analgesics releases Mr. Teas's fertile imagination, and the scene is shown through this viewpoint. Rather than the typical equipment-cluttered dental office, only a dentist, a dental chair, Mr. Teas, and the assistant are present against a stark and simple background. Only, now, the assistant is completely nude. As the procedure is completed, the dentist removes the molar from Mr. Teas's mouth, but rather than only a small object in the extraction pliers, the molar has the appearance of a single large staghorn (deer antler) with a number of points. The body of the "molar" is white, and each tip (representing the roots of the molar) is colored a bloody red. Mr. Teas has paid a price for his lustful imagination.

== Reception ==
The film was a big box office success.

According to Roger Ebert, "As plots go, Teas was not terrifically subtle. It is essentially a silent comedy with counterpoint narration. But the movie's jolly irony overcame any feeling of embarrassment or self-consciousness on the part of audiences who were, for the most part, seeing a nude woman on the screen for the first time."

Meyer called the film's success "a fluke, an absolute fluke."

According to The Wall Street Journal, the film led to over a hundred imitations being made in the next 12 months.
