= Common Law Cabin =

1967 film by Russ Meyer

- Directed by: Russ Meyer
- Written by: Russ Meyer; Jack Moran
- Starring: Alaina Capri; Babette Bardot; Jack Moran
- Cinematography: Russ Meyer
- Music by: Igo Kantor
- Release date: 1967
- Running time: 70 min.
- Country: United States
- Language: English

Common Law Cabin (original title How Much Loving Does a Normal Couple Need?) is a 1967 exploitation film directed by Russ Meyer. The movie features Alaina Capri and Meyer regulars Babette Bardot and Jack Moran.

== Plot ==
Dewey Hoople runs a broken down tourist trap along the Colorado River with his French wife Babette and his daughter Coral. Business is so bad that Hoople must pay local alcoholic Cracker to entice tourists, called "suckers", to spend some time and money there.

== Cast ==
- Babette Bardot as Babette
- Frank Bolger as Cracker
- Alaina Capri as Sheila Ross
- John Furlong as Dr. Martin Ross
- Andrew Hagara as Laurence Talbot III
- Jackie Moran as Dewey Hoople
- Adele Rein as Coral Hoople
- Ken Swofford as Barney Rickert

== Production ==
It was co-written by Russ Meyer and Jack Moran, and filmed on location on the Colorado River in Arizona. Other portions of the film were shot in the Coachella Valley, California.

== Reception ==
Roger Ebert later wrote that the film, along with Good Morning and Goodbye, was "not among Meyer's best later work. The plots are too diffuse to maintain dramatic tension, the acting is indifferent, and there is an uncharacteristic amount of aimless dialogue. In retrospect, however, these films can be seen as Meyer's gradual disengagement from plot."

== See also ==
- List of American films of 1967
