= Black Snake (film) =

1973 film by Russ Meyer

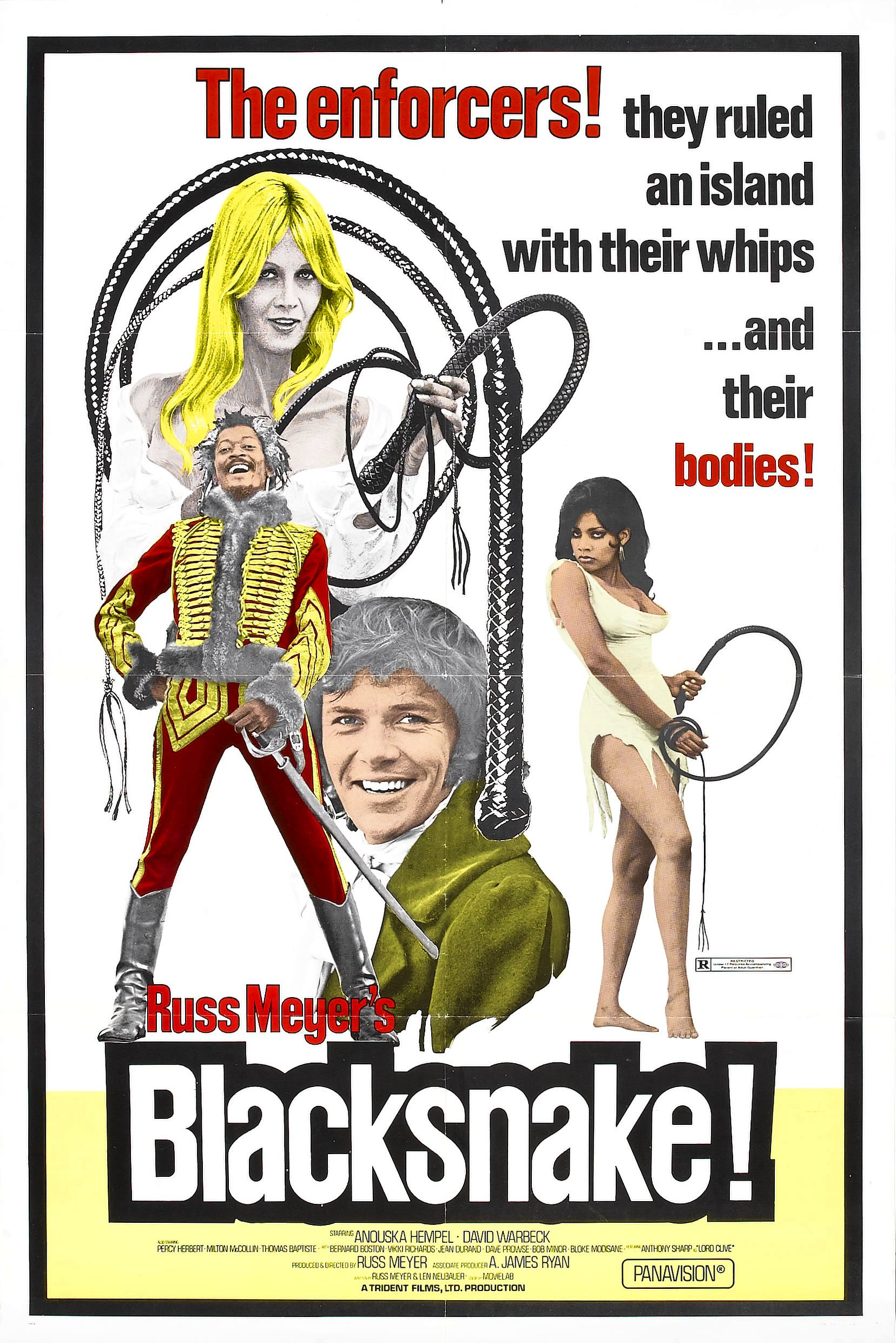
- Directed by: Russ Meyer
- Written by: Russ Meyer; Leonard Neubauer
- Story by: Russ Meyer; Anthony James Ryan
- Produced by: Russ Meyer
- Starring: Anouska Hempel; David Warbeck; Percy Herbert; Milton McCollin; Thomas Baptiste; Bernard Boston; Vicki Richards; Jean Durand; David Prowse; Bob Minor; Bloke Moosane; Anthony Sharp
- Cinematography: Arthur Ornitz
- Edited by: Fred Baratta
- Music by: William Loose
- Production company: Trident Pictures
- Distributed by: Signal 166
- Release date: March 28, 1973
- Running time: 82 minutes
- Country: United States
- Language: English
- Budget: $200,000

Black Snake is a 1973 American film directed by Russ Meyer and starring Anouska Hempel, David Warbeck, Percy Herbert and Thomas Baptiste. It was Meyer's return to self-financed projects, following the end of his brief deal at 20th Century Fox. Meyer's only attempt at the Blaxploitation genre, it was filmed in Panavision and was shot on location in Barbados. It was such a box office bomb that a film named Foxy starring Edy Williams, which Meyer wanted to follow this film, was not made.

Meyer's vision was a period piece about colonial slavery in which a cruel slave-owner and plantation mistress dominates both the black and white men of the island. However, just before filming was to begin the original lead actress fell ill, so Anouska Hempel, a New Zealand-born actress based in the UK, was cast at the last minute. This decision haunted Meyer for years, with the filmmaker frequently complaining that the role was unsuitable for Hempel.

== Plot ==
In 1835, Charles Walker travels to Saint Kitts in the British West Indies to look for his missing brother Jonathan. Charles pretends to be a bookkeeper when arrives at Blackmoor Plantation, run by Jonathan's vicious ex-wife, Lady Susan Walker.

== Cast ==
- Anouska Hempel as Lady Susan
- David Warbeck as Sir Charles Walker / Ronald Sopwith
- Percy Herbert as Overseer
- Milton McCollin as Joshua
- Thomas Baptiste as Isiah
- Bernard Boston as Captain Daladier
- Vikki Richards as Slave Girl
- David Prowse as Walker's Brother

== Release ==
Black Snake was originally released theatrically in the UK as Slaves on 23 March 1973. Internationally it has also been released under the title Sweet Suzy.

== Production ==
=== Development ===
After making two films for 20th Century Fox Meyer wanted to return to independent filmmaking. He did not want to go back to the sorts of films he had done in the past though as he felt there would no longer be a market for it due to the growth in pornographic movies and increasing permissiveness of studio films.

Meyer got the idea for the film after reading "some legend material from the Caribbean". He wanted "to dabble a little bit in a black film. The successful films that I've made have always been in the parody genre, so I figured I would try to come up with something that was kind of irreverent, like All in the Family, maybe."

"The story is very soapy in one way," said Meyer. "This is not a sex film", he said. "It's mainly sex and violence. It's hellishly entertaining."

"This is a very liberal film, extremely so, and it's told in a manner that is forthright, and with my rambunctious style," said Meyer. "I think there are a lot of places in the film where the blacks will get up and start cheering, particularly when they start whipping the white overseer who's been whipping them for a long time."

Meyer described the characters as "a lot bigger than life. They're right out of an Al Capp cartoon. There are only two really sympathetic people in the picture, but for the most part, they're all terribly bad people."

=== Casting ===
Meyer said finding the female lead was "a problem, because she's not the typical girl that I've had- the great cantilevered structured girl. First of all, I had to have a very good actress, which was more important than the physical characteristics. Also, I had to have someone who, like the rest of the cast could speak with a British accent, in order to make this thing work."

Meyer cast Anouska Hempel who he said had "a great ass on her, she's attractive in the same way as Brigitte Bardot. And she's a good actress. She even came up with a cockney accent."

=== Filming ===
The film was shot on location in Barbados in 1972. Meyer says he managed to get co-operation from the Barbadian government when he told them "the blacks win". The film was shot over seven weeks with three weeks of pre-production, plus another week of second unit.

Meyer found shooting difficult. "Every day there was a new staggering problem that was presented to us," he said. "It was a very arduous thing, working in the cane fields, the humidity and the heat, the uncomfortableness of it, and I didn't provide all the niceties that an awful lot of these English actors expected, tea and umbrellas and folding chairs and so on." Meyer was unhappy with two performances although he refused to say who they were.

Meyer said he spent "an enormously long period of time cutting" the film even though he wanted "to get away from the editing because it can be a real timeconsuming thing. I've got to spend more time in story development and casting, things of that nature. But I know that if I do not cut it myself, it will not have that same moxie that all the other Russ Meyer films have."

Meyer said the budget was a little over $200,000, but if he had made it for a studio it would have cost at least a million dollars.

== Reception ==
Theatrical poster for Black Snake re-released as Sweet Suzy.

The film flopped and in 1978 had still yet to cover its money. In 1980 Meyer claimed he had "just" recouped his money.

Meyer later said it "had a lot of things wrong with it. It had a skinny leading lady and she was British. All the actors were British. It was a costume movie. Like everything you could possibly do wrong, I did. It was a weak Mandingo. It's been called Sweet Susie and now it's called Duchess of Doom ... We thought we were making a picture that the blacks would really love. Now if we had made it about four years before it might have been a blockbuster. But we ended up with a film that blacks and whites both hated. The only place it did good business was in Little Rock." "I was totally out of my element", Meyer said.

Filmink argued the film failed because it had a white hero not a black one.

== See also ==
- List of American films of 1973
