= Pandora Peaks =

American model and pornographic actress

- Born: Stephanie Schick; April 12, 1964 (age 62); Atlanta, Georgia, U.S.
- Occupations: Adult actress; model
- Years active: 1991–2003
- Modeling information
- Height: 5 ft 6 in (1.68 m) measurements 72HHH-22-36
- Hair color: Blonde
- Eye color: Green

Stephanie Schick (born April 12, 1964), known professionally as Pandora Peaks, is a retired American adult model for magazine and film, actress, and stripper. She posed for more than 100 men's magazines, such as Playboy, Score and Gent.

== Biography ==
In the 1990s, Peaks appeared as a catalog model for Pango Pango swimwear, emphasizing their claim to be able to fit any woman. Her measurements (in 1995) were 72HHH-22-36; and she is hence known for her extraordinarily sized bust, yet slim other measurements.

Credited as Stephanie Schick, she appeared in minor roles in the 1991 Andy Sidaris spy movie Do or Die, playing the character Atlanta Lee, and in the 1996 Demi Moore film Striptease, playing stripper Urbana Sprawl.

In 1998, Peaks starred in Visions & Voyeurism, a 60-minute documentary-style movie. Shot on location at sites in Hollywood and Southern California, it featured Peaks posing nude, in full view of passers-by.

Peaks starred in the eponymous Pandora Peaks, Russ Meyer's final film, released in 2005. The 72-minute direct-to-video film has no dialogue, just footage of Peaks undressing, dressing and walking around, with narration by Peaks and Meyer.
