= Russ Meyer =

American filmmaker and photographer (1922–2004)

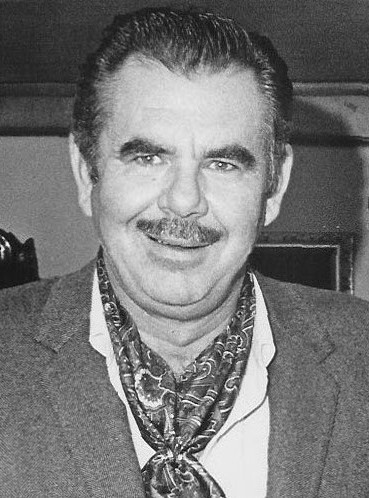
- Meyer in 1970
- Born: Russell Albion Meyer; March 21, 1922; San Leandro, California, U.S.
- Died: September 18, 2004 (aged 82); Los Angeles, California, U.S.
- Occupations: Film director; producer; screenwriter; cinematographer; editor; distributor; photographer
- Years active: 1947–2001
- Spouses: Betty Valdovinos (m. 1949; div. 1950) Eve Meyer (m. 1952; div. 1966) Edy Williams (m. 1970; div. 1975)
- Military career
- Allegiance: United States
- Branch: United States Army
- Service years: 1941–45
- Rank: Technician Third Grade
- Units: 3rd Army; 166th Signal Photo Company
- Conflicts: World War II

Russell Albion Meyer (March 21, 1922 – September 18, 2004) was an American filmmaker and photographer. He was primarily known for writing and directing a successful series of sexploitation films featuring campy humor, sly satire and large-breasted women, which have attracted a considerable cult following.

His best-known works include Faster, Pussycat! Kill! Kill! (1965), Vixen! (1968), Supervixens (1975), Beneath the Valley of the Ultra-Vixens (1979), and the film he considered to be his definitive work, Beyond the Valley of the Dolls (1970).

== Early years ==
Russ Meyer was born in San Leandro, California, the son of Lydia Lucinda Hauck Howe and William Arthur Meyer, an Oakland police officer. Meyer's parents divorced soon after he was born, and Meyer was to have virtually no contact with his father during his life. When he was 14 years old, his mother pawned her wedding ring in order to buy him an 8 mm film camera. He made a number of amateur films at the age of 15, and served during World War II as a U.S. Army combat cameraman for the 166th Signal Photo Company at the rank of technician third grade (equivalent to staff sergeant).

In the Army, Meyer forged his strongest friendships, and he would later ask many of his fellow combat cameramen to work on his films. Much of Meyer's work during World War II can be seen in newsreels and in the film Patton (1970).

On his return to civilian life, he was unable to secure cinematography work in Hollywood due to a lack of industry connections. He made industrial films, freelanced as a still photographer for mainstream films (including Giant), and became a well-known glamour photographer whose work included some of the initial shoots for Hugh Hefner's Playboy magazine. Meyer would go on to shoot three Playboy centerfolds during the magazine's early years, including one of his then-wife Eve Meyer in 1955. He also shot a pictorial of then-wife Edy Williams in March 1973 and remained on the periphery of Hefner's Playboy Mansion West "gang list" milieu long into the 1990s, likely in part due to their shared interest in monitoring First Amendment litigation.

== Film career ==
=== Early films ===
Meyer was the cinematographer for the 1952 Pete DeCenzie short film French Peep Show, and the 1954 Samuel Newman production, The Desperate Women, among the few Hollywood films to depict a woman dying from an illegal abortion in pre–Roe v. Wade America, the original version of which is believed lost.

=== The "nudie-cutie" period ===
His first feature, the naughty comedy The Immoral Mr. Teas (1959), cost $24,000 to produce and eventually grossed more than $1 million on the independent/exploitation circuit, enthroning Meyer as "King of the Nudies." It is considered one of the first nudie-cuties.

Russ Meyer was an auteur who wrote, directed, edited, photographed and distributed all his own films. He was able to finance each new film from the proceeds of the earlier ones, and became very wealthy in the process.

Meyer followed Teas with some shorts, This Is My Body (1960) and The Naked Camera, then made a second nudie cutie, Eve and the Handyman (1960). This starred Meyer's wife Eve and Anthony-James Ryan, both of whom would be crucial to the production of Meyer's films.

His next features were Erotica (1961) and Wild Gals of the Naked West (1962). Audience reception of Wild Gals was lukewarm, and Meyer decided to change genres.

He did a documentary, Europe in the Raw (1963), and tried a comedy, Heavenly Bodies! (1963).

He then directed a version of Fanny Hill (1964) in Europe.

=== The "Gothic" period ===
Lorna (1964) marked the end of Meyer's "nudies" and his first foray into serious film making.

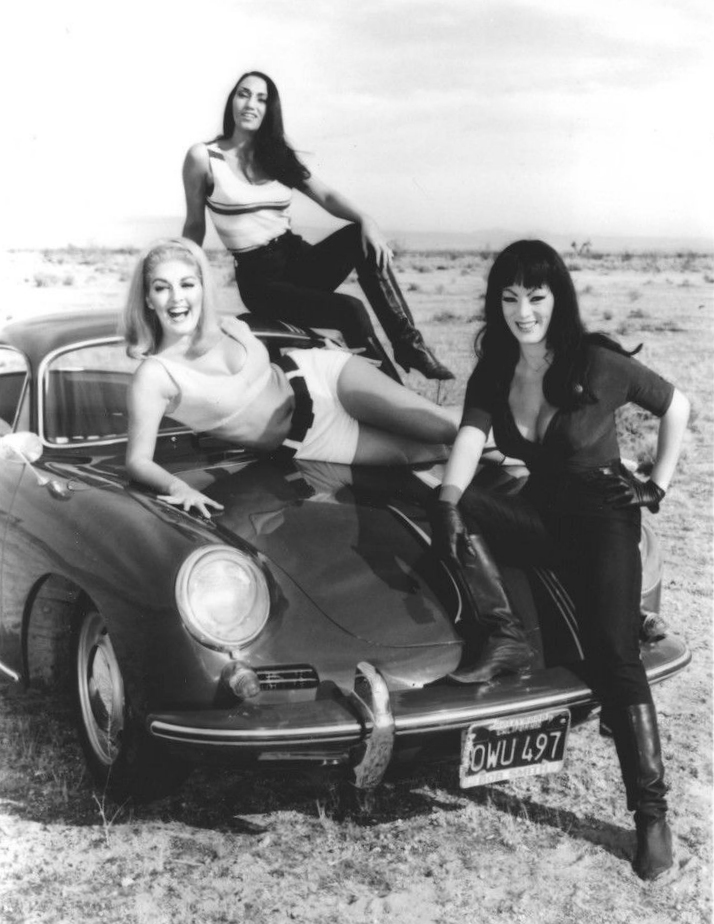
Promotional shot for Faster, Pussycat! Kill! Kill!

He followed this with three other similar films, and would call this his "Gothic" period: Mudhoney (1965), Motorpsycho (1965) and Faster, Pussycat! Kill! Kill! (1965).

Lorna was successful commercially, making almost a million dollars. Mudhoney was more ambitious, based on a novel, and did not perform as well. Motorpsycho, about three men terrorising the countryside, was a big hit for Meyer, so he decided to make a film about three bad girls, Faster, Pussycat! Kill! Kill! was commercially underwhelming but would eventually be acclaimed by the film critics as a cult classic. It has a following in the world and has inspired imitations, music videos and tributes.

=== Color melodramas ===
Meyer made the popular mockumentary Mondo Topless (1966) with the remnants of his production company's assets and made two mildly successful color melodramas: Common Law Cabin (1967) and Good Morning... and Goodbye! (1967).

Meyer made headlines once again in 1968 with the controversial Vixen!. Although its lesbian overtones are tame by today's standards, the film—envisaged by Meyer and longtime producer Jim Ryan as a reaction to provocative European art films—grossed millions on a five-figure budget and captured the zeitgeist just as The Immoral Mr. Teas had a decade earlier.

He followed it with Finders Keepers, Lovers Weepers! (1969), and Cherry, Harry & Raquel! (1970), which used long montages of the California landscape (replete with anti-marijuana voiceovers) and Uschi Digard dancing in the desert as the film's "lost soul." These plot devices were necessitated after lead actress Linda Ashton left the shoot early, forcing Meyer to compensate for 20 minutes of unshot footage.

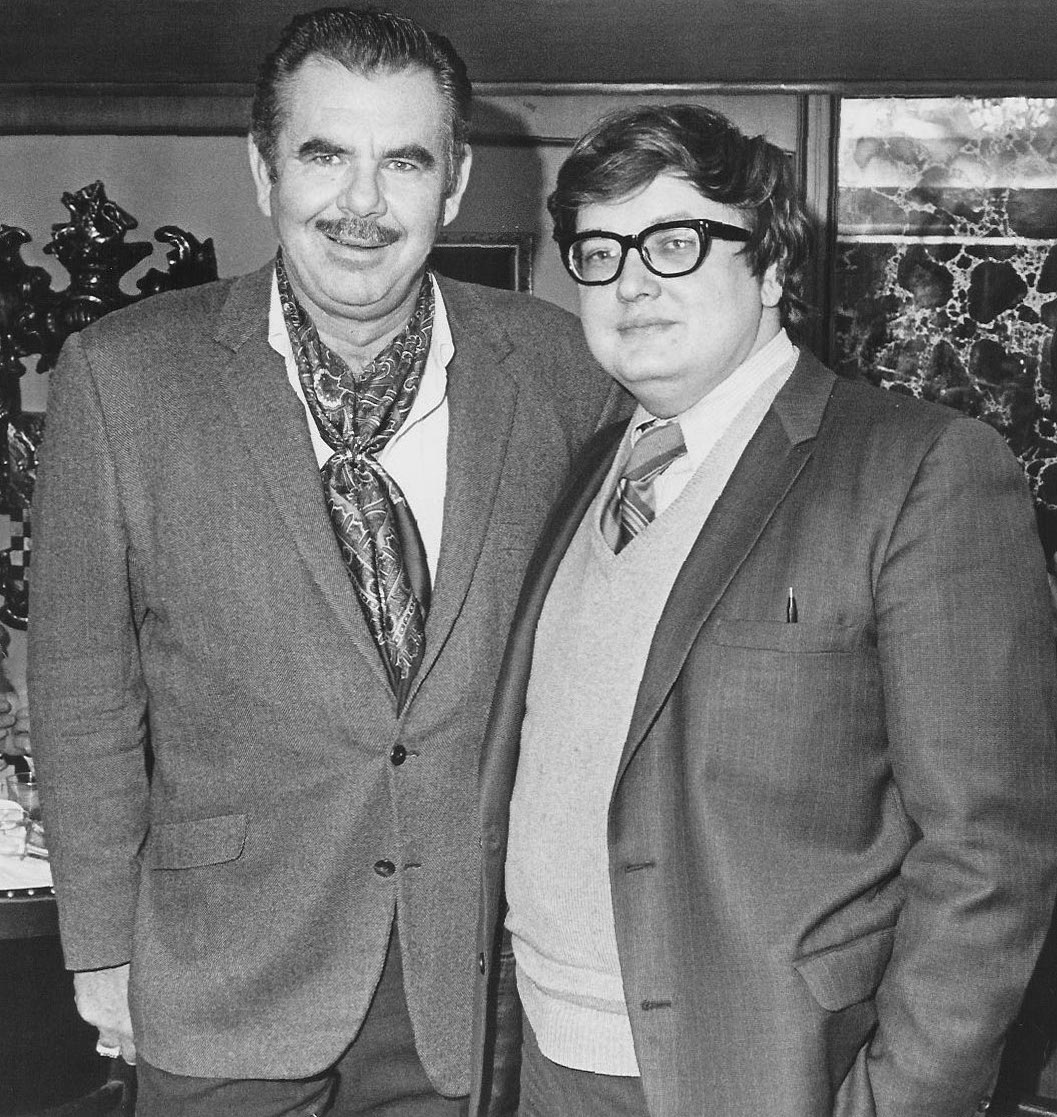
Meyer (left) and Roger Ebert in 1970

=== 20th Century Fox ===
After the unexpected success of Columbia Pictures' low-budget Easy Rider, and impressed by Meyer's frugality and profitability, Richard D. Zanuck and David Brown of 20th Century Fox signed Meyer to produce and direct a proposed sequel to Valley of the Dolls in 1969, fulfilling Meyer's longstanding ambition to direct for a major Hollywood studio. What eventually appeared was Beyond the Valley of the Dolls (1970), scripted by Chicago Sun-Times film critic and longtime Meyer devotee Roger Ebert. Ebert, who became the first film critic to receive the Pulitzer Prize for Criticism in 1975, would remain a close friend and key artistic collaborator for the remainder of Meyer's life.

The film bears no relation to the novel or film adaptation's continuity, a development necessitated when Jacqueline Susann sued the studio after several drafts of her script were rejected. Many critics perceive the film as perhaps the greatest expression of his intentionally vapid surrealism, with Meyer going so far as to refer to it as his definitive work in several interviews. Others, such as Variety, saw it "as funny as a burning orphanage and a treat for the emotionally retarded." Contractually stipulated to produce an R-rated film, the brutally violent climax (depicting a decapitation) ensured an X rating (eventually reclassified to NC-17 in 1990). Despite gripes from the director after he attempted to recut the film to include more titillating scenes after the ratings debacle, it still earned $9 million domestically in the United States on a budget of $2.09 million.

The executives at Fox were delighted with the box office success of Dolls and signed a contract with Meyer to make three more films: The Seven Minutes, from a bestseller by Irving Wallace; Everything in the Garden, from a play by Edward Albee; and The Final Steal, from a 1966 novel by Peter George. "We've discovered that he's very talented and cost conscious", said Zanuck. "He can put his finger on the commercial ingredients of a film and do it exceedingly well. We feel he can do more than undress people."

Per his new contract, Meyer then made a faithful adaptation of The Seven Minutes (1971). Featuring loquacious courtroom scenes alongside little nudity, the comparatively subdued film was commercially unsuccessful, and his oeuvre would be disowned by the studio for decades after Zanuck and Brown departed to form an independent production company in 1972.

=== Return to independent filmmaking ===
Richard Zanuck, who brought Meyer to Fox, had moved to Warner Bros and there was some talk Meyer would make a film at that studio. However, Meyer would never make a studio film again. He returned to exploitation-style independent cinema in 1973 with the blaxploitation period piece Black Snake, which was dismissed by critics and audiences as incoherent.

Foxy, a proposed vehicle for Edy Williams, was cancelled in the wake of the United States Supreme Court's Miller v. California decision in June 1973, which modified its definition of obscenity from that of "utterly without socially redeeming value" to that which lacks "serious literary, artistic, political, or scientific value". His marriage to Williams subsequently disintegrated.

"Those years were very confusing to me", said Meyer. "But instead of rushing off and throwing myself out the window, I was able to psychoanalyze myself and discern what was best for me. I looked myself square in the face and realized I couldn't do everything."

In 1975, he released Supervixens, a return to the world of big bosoms, square jaws, and the Sonoran Desert that earned $8.2 million during its initial theatrical run in the United States on a shoestring budget.

Meyer's theatrical career ended with the release of the surreal Up! (1976) and 1979's Beneath the Valley of the Ultra-Vixens, his most sexually graphic films. Film historians and fans have called these last three films "Bustoons" because his use of color and mise en scène recalled larger-than-life pop art settings and cartoonish characters.

In 1977, Malcolm McLaren hired Meyer to direct a film starring The Sex Pistols. Meyer handed the scriptwriting duties over to Ebert, who, in collaboration with McLaren, produced a screenplay entitled Who Killed Bambi? According to Ebert, filming ended after a day and a half when the electricians walked off the set after McLaren was unable to pay them. (McLaren has claimed that the project was scrapped at the behest of the main financier and Meyer's erstwhile employer, 20th Century Fox, whose board of directors considered the prospect of a Meyer production to be untenable and incompatible with the insurgent family values ethos in popular culture.) The project ultimately evolved into The Great Rock 'n' Roll Swindle.

=== Later years ===
Despite hardcore pornographic films overtaking Meyer's softcore market share, he retired from filmmaking in the late 1970s a very wealthy man.

Throughout the 1980s and 1990s, Meyer announced several projects (including the Dirty Harry parody Blitzen, Vixen and Harry, ultimately thwarted by Meyer reneging on a profit-sharing agreement with envisaged lead actor/co-scenarist Charles Napier; a sequel to Mondo Topless provisionally entitled Mondo Topless, Too; and a color remake of Faster, Pussycat! Kill! Kill!) that stalled in development hell. "I don't care about making another movie," he concluded in 1988. "I got all the money I'll ever need. You gotta be hungry to make a movie. I don't have the desire, the urge."

Amid Meyer's cognitive decline, longtime factotum Jim Ryan oversaw the 2001 direct-to-video release of Russ Meyer's Pandora Peaks, featuring the nude glamour model of the same name. (An analogous film featuring Meyer's then-partner Melissa Mounds was never completed.) Around the same time, he also participated in Voluptuous Vixens II, a made-for-video softcore production by Playboy.

Pandora Peaks interpolated footage originally intended for The Breast of Russ Meyer (1979-c. 2001), an unfinished "gargantuan, umpteen-hour anthology film" that would have encompassed précises of Meyer's earlier films; memoiristic documentary footage (including voluminous accounts of his Army service in which Kitten Natividad functioned as a metonymic representation of Meyer's sexual desires, culminating in a timer-shot assignation between the filmmaker and his last significant muse); and Mondo Topless-style profiles of such performers as "Tundi" Horvath, Shawn "Baby Doll" Devereaux, Tami Roche and Kristine Mills. In late 1985, Variety reported that the film had "rapidly [approached] $2 million in production costs" and was "nearly 12 hours in length." In December 2024, Russ Meyer Trust officer Janice Cowart confirmed that all project footage for The Breast of Russ Meyer was bequeathed to the Museum of Modern Art. The institution had expressed its intent to acquire the project by the late 1980s (per a contemporaneous 1988 interview with Roger Ebert for Meyer's installment of The Incredibly Strange Film Show, which also previewed brief snippets of a wartime-oriented segment featuring Natividad and Roche) and remains interested in "doing something" with the film.

== Use of satire ==
Russ Meyer was also adept at mocking moral stereotypes and flagrantly lampooning conservative American values. Many of his films feature a narrator who attempts to give the audience a "moral roadmap" of what they are watching. Like his contemporary Terry Southern, Meyer realized that sex—as one of the few common interests among most humans—was a natural vehicle for satirizing values and conventions held by the Greatest Generation. According to Roger Ebert in a commentary recorded in 2003 for the DVD release of Beyond the Valley of the Dolls, Meyer continually reiterated that this irreverence was the true secret to his artistic success.

Meyer was also known for his quick wit. While participating with Ebert in a panel discussion at Yale University, he was confronted by an angry woman who accused him of being "nothing but a breast man." His immediate reply: "That's only the half of it."

== Female empowerment ==
Film historian and Meyer biographer Jimmy McDonough posits that Russ Meyer's usage of physically and sexually overwhelming female characters places him in his own separate genre. He argues that despite portraying women as sex objects, Meyer nonetheless depicts them as more powerful than men and is therefore an inadvertent feminist filmmaker.

In many of Meyer's films, women eventually defeat men, winning sexual fulfillment as their reward, such as in Super Vixen (Supervixens), Margo Winchester (Up!) and Lavonia Shedd (Beneath the Valley of the Ultra-Vixens). Even in the 1950s and 1960s, his films were sometimes centered on a woman's need and struggle for sexual satisfaction (Lorna, Good Morning and... Goodbye! and Beneath the Valley of the Ultra-Vixens). Additionally, Russ Meyer's female characters were often allowed to express anger and violence towards men (Faster, Pussycat! Kill! Kill! and Supervixens).

Yet in his research, McDonough also notes that Meyer's female characters were limited in how powerful they could appear; often the female lead is raped (Up! and Lorna) or brutally murdered (Beyond the Valley of the Dolls, Supervixens, Lorna and Blacksnake). While Russ Meyer may have championed powerful woman characters, he also portrayed them in violent and terrifying situations, in which they demonstrate their physical and mental strength against tremendous odds. He also ensured that women's breasts were at least semi-exposed during these ordeals for comic or erotic effect. Furthermore, according to his frequent collaborator and longtime companion Kitten Natividad, Meyer's love of dominant women extended to his personal life, and he was almost always in a tumultuous relationship.

== Personal and family life ==
During World War II, according to Meyer, he was in a French brothel with Ernest Hemingway who, upon finding out that Meyer was a virgin, offered him the prostitute of his choice. Meyer picked the one with the largest breasts.

Despite his reputation, Meyer never employed the casting couch during his career's peak years (though that shifted during his post-1980 unfinished projects) and rarely had sex with any of his actresses. He had no children, though there were rumored unsuccessful pregnancies with his second wife Edy Williams and last serious girlfriend, Melissa Mounds, who also was found guilty of assaulting him in 1999.

There is a longstanding rumor among his closest friends and at least one biographer that he had a son in 1964 with a secret lover who he would refer to only as "Miss Mattress" or "Janet Buxton"; this relationship commenced in 1963 (as Meyer's first extramarital liaison during his relationship with Eve Meyer) at the Hollywood Players Motel on Vine Street and continued "periodically over the years" (with their "strictly carnal" meet-ups "never extending beyond three hours at any one time") "until he could no longer function," according to Jimmy McDonough.

Meyer was very upfront throughout his life about being too selfish to be a father or even a caring partner or husband. Yet he is also said to have been very generous with all his friends and acquaintances, and never isolated friends from one another. Biographers have attributed most of his brutish and eccentric nature to the fact that he was abandoned by his father, an Oakland police officer, and coddled by his mother, Lydia, who was married six times. Meyer had a half-sister, Lucinda, who was diagnosed in her 20s with paranoid schizophrenia and was committed to California State mental institutions until her death in 1999. Mental illness ran in his family and was something he secretly feared. During his entire life, Russ Meyer always spoke of his mother and sister with the highest reverence.

Meyer was married to:

- Betty Valdovinos (born 1922, divorced)
- Eve Meyer (December 13, 1928 – March 27, 1977, died in the Tenerife airport disaster)
- Edy Williams (born July 9, 1942, divorced)

Contrary to some accounts, Meyer was never married to Kitten Natividad, his longtime companion and the star of his final two films.

== Final years ==
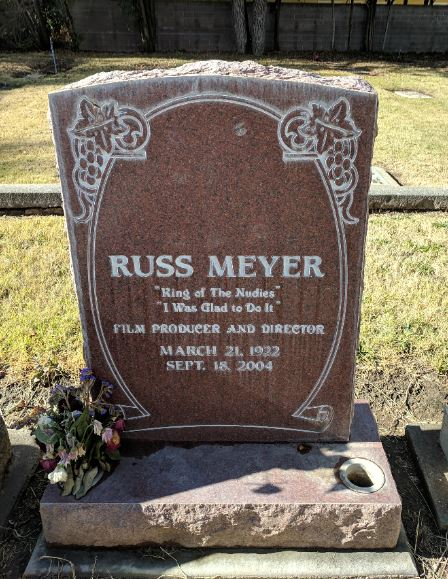
Meyer's gravestone, located in the Stockton Rural Cemetery in Stockton, California

Meyer owned the rights to nearly all of his films and spent the majority of the 1980s and 1990s making millions reselling his films on the home video and DVD market. He worked out of his Los Angeles home and usually took telephone orders in person. A major retrospective of his work was given at the British Film Institute which Meyer attended in 1982. The Chicago Film Festival honored his work in 1985, for which he also made a personal appearance, and many revival movie houses booked his films for midnight movie marathons.

He also worked obsessively for over a decade on a massive three-volume autobiography, titled A Clean Breast. Finally printed in 2000, it features numerous excerpts of reviews, clever details of each of his films and countless photos and erotic musings.

Starting in the mid-1990s, Meyer had frequent fits and bouts of memory loss. By 2000, he was diagnosed with Alzheimer's disease, and his health and well-being were thereafter looked after by Janice Cowart, his secretary and estate executor. That same year, with no wife or children to claim his wealth, Meyer willed that the majority of his money and estate would be sent to the Memorial Sloan Kettering Cancer Center in honor of his late mother.

Russ Meyer died at his home in the Hollywood Hills (from complications of pneumonia), on September 18, 2004, at the age of 82. Meyer's grave is located at Stockton Rural Cemetery in San Joaquin County, California.

== Filmography ==
=== Feature films as director ===
Year	Title	Director	Writer	Producer	Editor	Cinematographer	Note
1959	The Immoral Mr. Teas	Yes	Yes	Yes	Yes	Yes	
1961	Erotica	Yes	Yes	Yes	Yes	Yes	Co-written with Jack Moran
1961	Eve and the Handyman	Yes	Yes	Yes	Yes	Yes	
1962	Wild Gals of the Naked West	Yes	Yes	Yes	Yes	Yes	Co-written with Jack Moran
1963	Europe in the Raw	Yes	Yes	Yes	Yes	Yes	
1964	Fanny Hill	Yes	No	No	No	No	
1964	Lorna	Yes	Yes	Yes	Yes	Yes	also story, co-written with James Griffith
1965	Mudhoney	Yes	No	Yes	Yes	No	
1965	Motorpsycho	Yes	Yes	Yes	Yes	Yes	Co-written with W.E. sprague and Ross Massbaum, also original writer
1965	Faster, Pussycat! Kill! Kill!	Yes	No	Yes	Yes	No	also original writer
1966	Mondo Topless	Yes	Yes	Yes	Yes	Yes	
1967	Common Law Cabin	Yes	No	Yes	Yes	No	
1967	Good Morning and... Goodbye!	Yes	No	Yes	Yes	Yes	
1968	Finders Keepers, Lovers Weepers!	Yes	No	Yes	Yes	Yes	
1968	Vixen!	Yes	No	Yes	Yes	Yes	also original writer
1969	Cherry, Harry & Raquel!	Yes	No	Yes	Yes	Yes	
1970	Beyond the Valley of the Dolls	Yes	No	Yes	No	No	also story
1971	The Seven Minutes	Yes	No	Yes	No	No	
1973	Black Snake	Yes	Yes	Yes	No	No	Co-written with Leonard Neubauer
1975	Supervixens	Yes	Yes	Yes	Yes	Yes	
1976	Up!	Yes	Yes	Yes	Yes	Yes	also camera operator and original writer
1979	Beneath the Valley of the Ultra-Vixens	Yes	Yes	Yes	Yes	Yes	Co-written with Roger Ebert, also original writer

=== Other work ===
- The French Peep Show (1950, short, cinematographer)
- The Desperate Women (1954, cinematographer)
- This Is My Body (1960, short), with Diane Webber
- The Naked Camera (1961, short)
- Heavenly Bodies! (1963, short)
- Skyscrapers & Brassieres (1963, short)
- Foxy/Viva Foxy (1972/1973, trailer only)
- Who Killed Bambi? (1978, abandoned)
- All the Way In! (1984, actor only)
- Amazon Women on the Moon (1987, actor only)
- Don't Change That Song (1987, music video for the band Faster Pussycat)
- Soultwister (1991, music video for the band Jean Park)
- Pandora Peaks (2001, compilation)
- The Breast of Russ Meyer (2001, compilation, unfinished)
