= Harkham =

Harkham may refer to:

== People ==
- Efrem Harkham, Israeli-born American hotelier from Los Angeles, California.
- Sammy Harkham (born 1980), American cartoonist from Los Angeles, California.
- Uri Harkham, American businessman from Los Angeles, California.

== Organizations ==
- Harkham Industries, a women's fashion company headquartered in Los Angeles, California.
- Harkham Properties, a commercial real estate company in Los Angeles, California.
- Harkham Winery, a winery in Pokolbin, New South Wales, Australia.
