= Design Icon Award =

Annual American award for interior or furniture design

- Description: Recognition of significant contributions to the interior and furniture design industry
- Country: United States
- Presented by: World Market Center Las Vegas / Las Vegas Design Center

The Design Icon Award is an annual award from the World Market Center Las Vegas and the Las Vegas Design Center to an interior or furniture designer who has made a large contribution to the industry. The recipients give a talk to the Las Vegas Market registered trade attendees. The award is given at a reception before the designer's presentation.

== Recipients ==
- 2011 Christopher Guy Harrison, a British luxury furniture designer
- 2010 Juan Montoya. a furniture designer. Much of his work is illustrated in the book, Juan Montoya. He was named one of Architecture Digest's Top 100
- 2009 Vicente Wolf, an interior designer for the past 35 years. He has written two books, Lifting the Curtain on Design and Crossing Boundaries: A Global Vision of Design
- 2009 Roger Thomas, executive vice president design for Wynn Design and Development, known for his redesign of The Mirage and Treasure Island resorts on the Strip, and then later the Bellagio, Wynn Las Vegas, Wynn Macau and Encore
- 2008 Vladimir Kagan. The New York Times called Kagan an "icon of modern furniture design" and the Wall Street Journal credited him as being one of the pioneers of modern-American design
- 2008 Larry Laslo, an interior landscapes for decades. His interiors have been published among the pages of Architectural Digest and The New York Times.
