= Drug house =

Building used for illegal drug activity

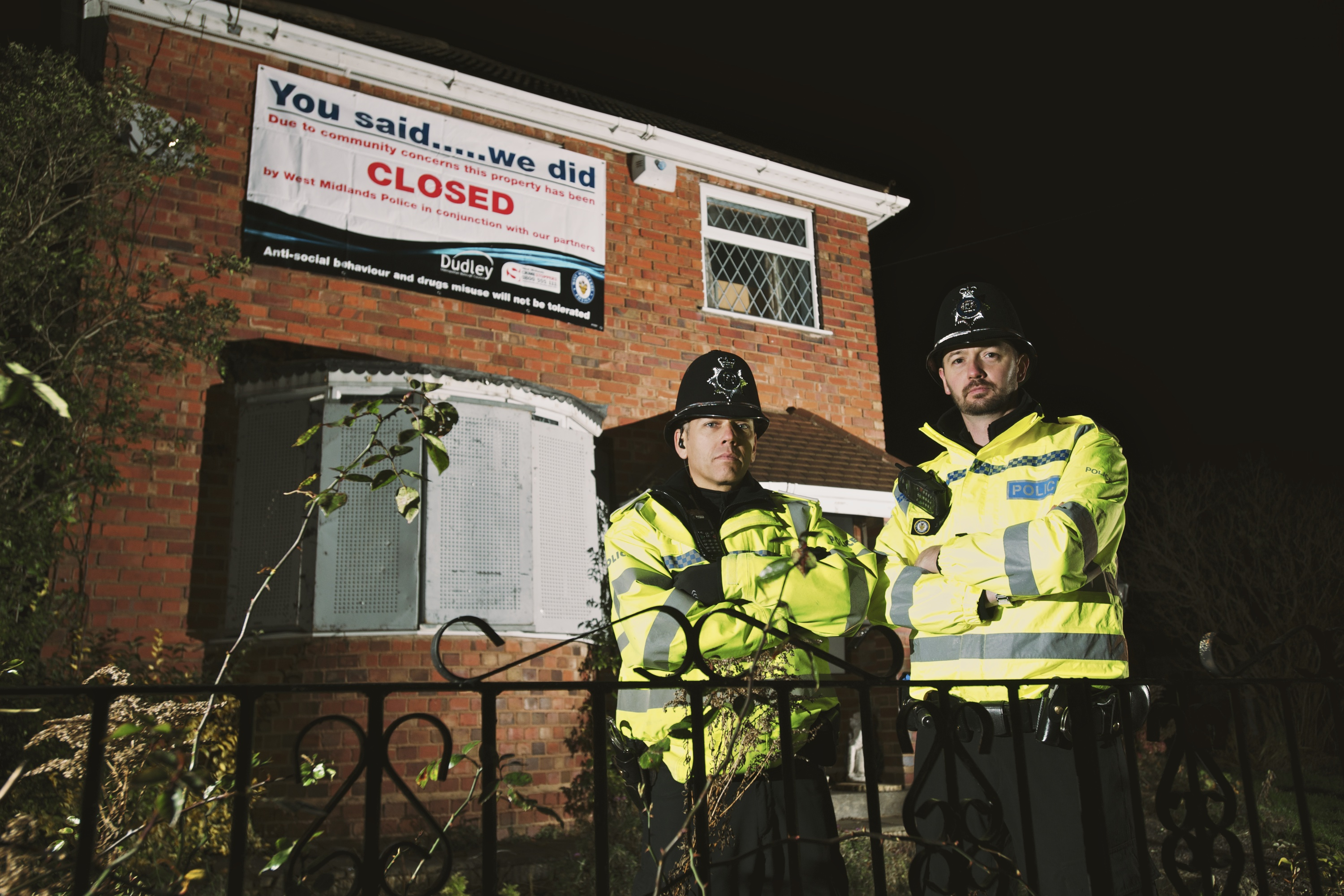
Crack house closure by West Midlands Police in the United Kingdom

A drug house (Note: Also known as a drug den, crack house, crack den, shooting gallery, trap house, or bando.) is a residence used in the illegal drug trade. Drug houses shelter drug users and provide a place for drug dealers to supply them. Drug houses can also be used as laboratories to synthesize (cook) drugs, or cache ingredients and product.

Drug houses have been an occasional subject presented in rap and trap music, with the latter genre being named after an American slang term for a drug house.

== United States ==
Demolition of a drug house in Harlingen, Texas, US in 2013

Many major American urban areas contain drug houses. Abandoned buildings ravaged by arson or neglect are utilized by drug dealers since they are free, obscure, and secluded, and there is no paper trail in the form of rent receipts. The sale of illegal drugs often draws violent crime to afflicted neighborhoods, sometimes exacerbating the exodus of residents. In some cases, enraged citizens have burned drug houses to the ground, in hopes that by destroying the sites for drug operations they would also drive the illegal industries from their neighborhoods.

== United Kingdom ==
Legislation in England and Wales provides a mechanism for police and local authorities to close premises which have been associated with disorder or serious nuisance. Often, these drug houses have been found in social housing, which has been taken over by drug dealers and users.

These closure orders were designed to disrupt class A drug dealing and anecdotal evidence suggests that it mainly affects socially housed tenants. The effect is that once an order is made, the premises are boarded up, and no one may enter the premises, initially for a period of three months, but this can be extended to six months on the application of the police.

== Popular culture ==
- Crack House
- Spike Lee's film Jungle Fever (the Taj Mahal sequence)
- In the movie New Jack City, antagonist Nino Brown takes over an apartment building and turns it into a drug house.

== See also ==
- Clandestine chemistry
- Grow house, typically used to cultivate marijuana
- Opium den, for consuming opium
- Rolling meth lab, transportable laboratory
