= Giorgio Beverly Hills =

Luxury goods store

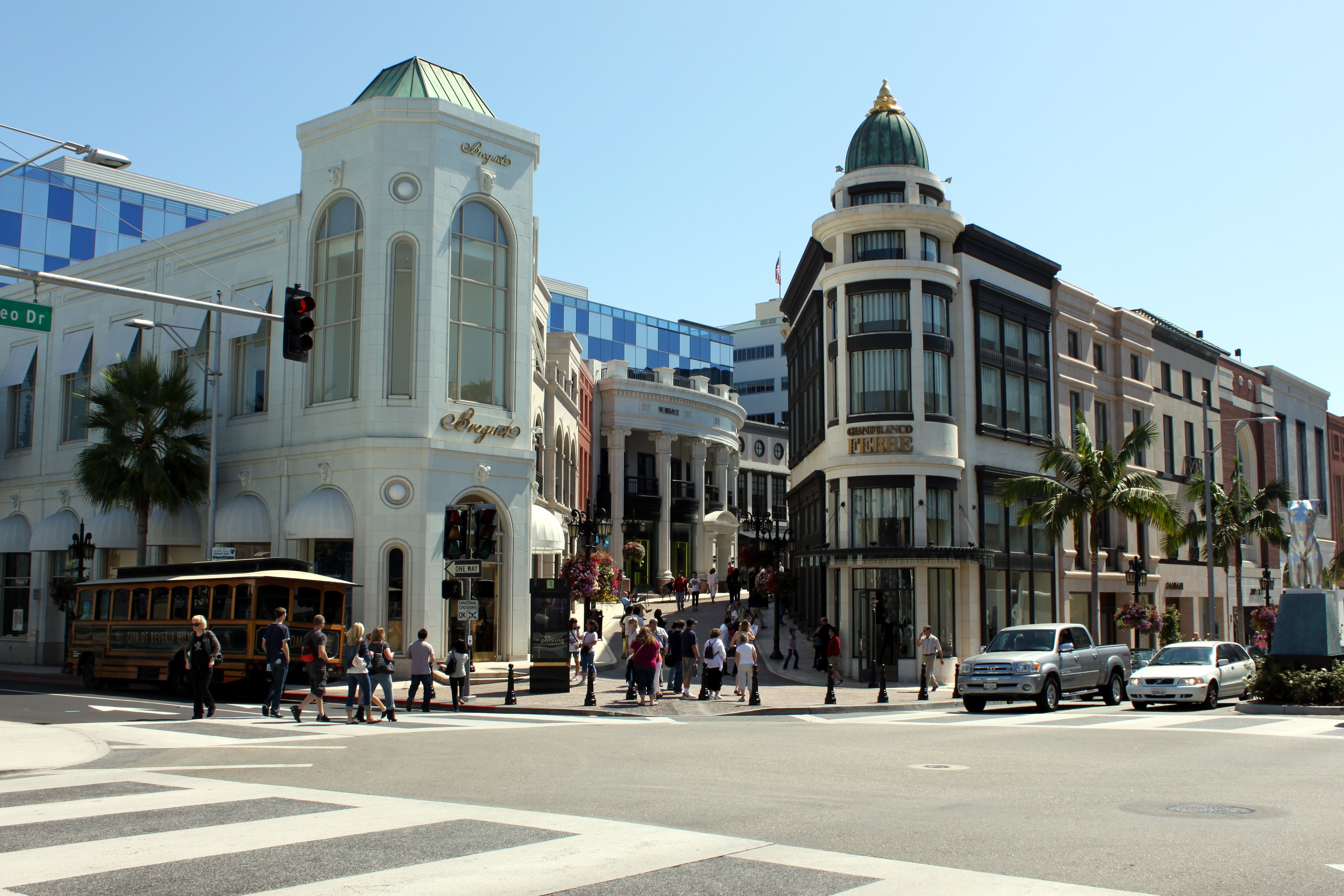
Giorgio Beverly Hills no longer exists but it was the pioneer in making Rodeo Drive a well-known luxury shopping district.

Giorgio Beverly Hills was a luxury goods store established in 1961. It was the first luxury boutique to be founded on Rodeo Drive in Beverly Hills, California.

== History ==
Giorgio Beverly Hills was founded by Fred Hayman and George Grant. The name was derived from Grant's first name. Giorgio Beverly Hills opened in 1961 at 273 Rodeo Drive at the junction with Dayton Way, which was then a very ordinary street. Gucci, Tiffany and others established Rodeo Drive stores in the mid-1970s. Hayman recognised the potential of the site, as it was close to The Beverly Hilton hotel, where he had been working. The store used a signature yellow-and-white striped awning, which came to symbolise a Beverly Hills lifestyle. Hayman bought out Grant in 1962.

The store had a reading room, pool table and oak bar, so that men could amuse themselves while the women shopped.

In 1979, it was determined that there should be a signature fragrance; two years later in November 1981, Giorgio was launched. In that year, the Rodeo Drive store had an annual turnover of $6 million. Fred Hayman and his wife Gale spent $260,000 on a huge launch party for the perfume, hosted by Merv Griffin, and with food from five of Los Angeles' top restaurants. The "GBH" fragrance business would soon turn over $100 million a year.

In 1987, the fragrance business and the Giorgio Beverly Hills brand was sold to Avon for $165 million. The store's name was changed to Fred Hayman Beverly Hills.

In 1994 the Giorgio brand was acquired by Procter and Gamble for $150 million that combined it with other luxury fragrance brands such as Hugo Boss, Laura Biagiotti and Otto Kern into what is now the P&G Prestige Beauté division.

=== Clientele ===
Customers included Natalie Wood, Princess Grace, Ronald Reagan, Nancy Reagan, Diana Ross, Charlton Heston, and Elizabeth Taylor.

== Present day ==
Giorgio Beverly Hills was identified as a subsidiary in Revlon's 2022 bankruptcy, as BrandCo Giorgio Beverly Hills 2020 LLC.

The location on 273 Rodeo Drive is now a branch of Louis Vuitton.
