= Phil Rubenstein =

American actor (1940–1992)

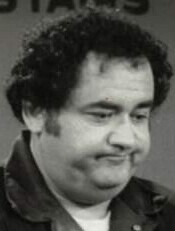
- Rubenstein in Working Stiffs, 1979
- Born: Philip Martin Rubenstein; August 3, 1940; The Bronx, New York City, U.S.
- Died: June 26, 1992 (aged 51); Los Angeles, California, U.S.
- Occupations: Film and television actor
- Years active: 1976–1992
- Spouse: Joan Rubenstein

Philip Martin Rubenstein (August 3, 1940 – June 26, 1992) was an American film and television actor. He was best known for playing Frank Falzone in the American sitcom television series Working Stiffs.

Rubenstein guest-starred in numerous television programs including Barney Miller, Taxi, Remington Steele, The Jeffersons, Riptide, Highway to Heaven, The Golden Girls Archie Bunker's Place, ALF, Who's the Boss?, Hill Street Blues and Silver Spoons. He also appeared in numerous films such as The Last American Virgin, Kidco, Mannequin, My Mom's a Werewolf, Tango & Cash, They Call Me Bruce?, RoboCop 2, Star Trek IV: The Voyage Home and Back to School.

Rubenstein died on June 26, 1992 of heart failure in Los Angeles, California, at the age of 51.
