= Crack House (film) =

- Theatrical release poster
- Directed by: Michael Fischa
- Screenplay by: Blake Schaeffer
- Story by: Jack Silverman
- Produced by: John Quinn; Jim Silverman; Joan Weidman
- Starring: Jim Brown; Anthony Geary; Angel Tompkins; Richard Roundtree; Greg Gomez Thomsen; Clyde R. Jones; Cheryl Kay
- Cinematography: Arledge Armenaki
- Edited by: Claudia Finkle; Bill Swenson
- Music by: Mike Piccirillo
- Production company: Silverman Entertainment
- Distributed by: Cannon Film Distributors
- Release date: November 10, 1989
- Running time: 90 minutes
- Country: United States
- Language: English
- Box office: $862,551

Crack House is a 1989 American crime film directed by Michael Fischa and written by Blake Schaeffer. The film stars Jim Brown, Anthony Geary, Richard Roundtree, Cher Butler, Angel Tompkins, Clyde Jones, Albert Michel Jr. and Heidi Thomas. The film was released on November 10, 1989, by Cannon Film Distributors.

== Cast ==
- Jim Brown as Steadman
- Anthony Geary as Dockett
- Richard Roundtree as Lieutenant Johnson
- Cher Butler as Melissa
- Angel Tompkins as Mother
- Clyde Jones as B.T.
- Albert Michel Jr. as Chico
- Heidi Thomas as Annie
- Kenny Edwards as Tripper
- Joey Green as "Buzz"
- Jon Greene as Officer Baylor
- T. Rodgers as "Jammer"
- Louis Rivera as Jesus
- Willie Hernandez as Lou
- Gregg Thomsen as Ricardo "Rick" Morales
- Jacob Vargas as Danny
- Michael Matthews as Teddy
- Derek Googe as David

== Reception ==
The film grossed $210,162 in its opening weekend.

== See also ==
- List of hood films
