= Delta Heat =

- Directed by: Michael Fischa
- Written by: Sam A. Scribner
- Story by: Bruce Akiyama
- Produced by: Richard L. Albert; Rudy Cohen; Uri Harkham (executive producer)
- Starring: Anthony Edwards; Lance Henriksen; Betsy Russell
- Cinematography: Avraham Karpick
- Edited by: Robert Gordon
- Music by: Christopher Tyng
- Production company: Sawmill Entertainment
- Distributed by: New City Releasing
- Release date: December 30, 1992
- Running time: 91 min.
- Country: United States
- Language: English

Delta Heat is a 1992 American comedy drama crime film directed by Michael Fischa and written by Sam A. Scribner. The screenplay was originally written by Bruce Akiyama to be a television pilot, commissioned by Sawmill Entertainment. After producer Richard L. Albert made The Forbidden Dance, he decided to hire writer Sam Scribner to expand the script to feature length.

== Plot ==
A Los Angeles Police Officer (Edwards) investigates the death of his partner in the swamps of Louisiana. He enlists the help of an ex-cop (Henriksen) who lost his hand to an alligator years before.

== Production ==
The film was shot in New Orleans, Louisiana. During production, producer Albert spent six hours in the bayous north of New Orleans convincing alligator hunter Bob Raymond to catch 40 alligators which appear in the final scene.

== Main cast ==
- Anthony Edwards as Mike Bishop
- Lance Henriksen as Jackson Rivers
- Betsy Russell as Vicky Forbes
- Linda Dona as Tine Tulane
- Rod Masterson as Crawford
- Clyde Jones as Clayborne
