= Ultimate Women Challenge =

Television series

- Genre: Reality
- Presented by: Amber Nichole Miller (Challenge Host); Joanna Krupa; Paula LaBaredas
- Country of origin: United States
- Original language: English

Production
- Producer: Lyle Howry
- Running time: 30 minutes
- Production company: Lyle Howry Productions

Ultimate Women Challenge was an unaired show featuring 16 female fighters who would win a prize of $50,000. During the filming of the Ultimate Women Challenge, Kaitlin Young faced Julie Kedzie on September 24, 2010. She defeated Kedzie by split decision.

== Cast ==
- Martha Benavides
- Heather Jo Clark
- Brandi Haines
- Barb Honchak
- Angela Hayes
- Julie Kedzie
- Angela Magaña
- Casey Noland
- Michelle Ould
- Colleen Schneider
- Karina Taylor
- Patricia Vidonic
- Kaitlin Young

== Production problems, litigation, and financial problems ==
The production was plagued with problems, with cast members later recounting to the press that they had been provided with insufficient food by the producers during the filming, and that there had been a lack of medical attention when an injury occurred.

The show's financier, Sean M. Morrison, foreclosed on rights to the show after the original producer, Lyle Howry Productions, did not repay a $600,000 loan. The producer had experienced financial problems from the start of the production.

Several fighters launched a lawsuit in Wisconsin against Lyle Howry Productions for nonpayment.

Morrison filed a lawsuit in Illinois federal court against several competitors in which he charged that they had misappropriated trade secrets by revealing the outcome of the series.
