= Death Spa =

1988 American film

- Promotional poster
- Directed by: Michael Fischa
- Written by: James Bartruff; Mitch Paradise
- Produced by: Jamie Beardsley-Jones
- Starring: William Bumiller; Brenda Bakke; Merritt Butrick
- Cinematography: Arledge Armenaki
- Edited by: Michael Kewley
- Music by: Peter Kaye
- Production companies: Maljack Productions; Shapiro-Glickenhaus Entertainment
- Distributed by: MPI Media Group
- Release date: July 1988 (U.S.)
- Running time: 87 minutes
- Country: United States
- Language: English
- Budget: $750,000

Death Spa is a 1988 (Note: Some sources indicate the film is a 1987 production, though it was first released in July 1988.) American supernatural slasher film directed by Michael Fischa and starring William Bumiller, Brenda Bakke, Merritt Butrick, Ken Foree, Karyn Parsons, Rosalind Cash, and Vanessa Bell Calloway. Its plot follows a series of mysterious deaths occurring in a high-tech Los Angeles health spa, resulting from the spirit of the owner's deceased wife, who possesses the club's intricate computer system.

In Europe and Asia, the film was released under the alternative title Witch Bitch.

Butrick's role in the film was his last before his death, while Parsons's role marked her feature film debut as an actress.

== Plot ==
After closing hours in the Starbody Health Spa in Los Angeles, Laura Danvers is mysteriously locked inside the sauna, which fills with chlorine gas, inducing chemical burns on her skin and eyes, nearly killing her. Her boyfriend Michael Evans—the club owner whose wife Catherine committed suicide the previous year—is notified and rushes to the hospital. The club features a state-of-the-art computer system which controls its various workout machines and other features, and is managed by David, Catherine's twin brother.

Los Angeles Police Department detectives Sergeant Stone and Lt. Fletcher arrive at Starbody to investigate Laura's accident. Shortly after, club patron Darla is nearly injured when the bolts holding the pool's diving board break loose. Later, Robert is brutally killed when a weightlifting machine malfunctions, tearing him apart at his limbs. Marci Hewitt, another patron, is brutally killed in the locker room by a spear. Michael brings Laura, still wearing bandages over her injured eyes, to the spa. Laura blindly goes searching for her things inside her locker. There, inside the locker, Marci is visibly mutilated but not discovered. Darla plays a prank on them by dressing in a zombie mask.

Troubled by nightmares and visions of Catherine, Michael visits Dr. Lido Moray, a parapsychologist, for answers regarding the strange incidents at the club. Moray uses psychometry on an object owned by Catherine, and divulges details to Michael about Catherine's life, including her paralysis after a traumatic childbirth in which the infant died, her subsequent depression and jealousy of Michael, and apparent suicide by self-immolation. Michael is skeptical of Moray's reading, believing he may have obtained the information from newspaper articles about Catherine's death.

Later, patron Linda is lured to the spa basement where she is doused with acid as an apparition of Catherine looks on. Meanwhile, David visits the recuperating Laura—still wearing eye patches, rendering her unable to see—while she is alone at Michael's house. Moray arrives at the spa under the guise of an insurance investigator, and finds Linda in the basement, her flesh decimated and barely alive. He is confronted by an apparition of Catherine, who brutally murders him. The next day, Michael visits his lawyer Tom to return his wristwatch, which Michael found in the computer control room. Priscilla, who is having an affair with Tom, is accused by Michael of sabotaging the club, but she denies it; Tom, however, is revealed to be vying to take ownership of the club.

Michael appoints instructors Marvin and Jeffrey to secure the club's computer room and keep David away. Stone and Fletcher discover that David has been hacking into the club computer system from his home, and suspect David may be cross-dressing as Catherine. That evening, a Mardi Gras party is held at the club. Catherine appears to infiltrate the room and kill Jeffrey before donning his mask and costume and wandering through the party. Catherine, revealed to be a vengeful ghost possessing David's body and manifesting in her living form, kidnaps Laura before binding and gagging her and attempting to kill her using the club's high-powered tanning bed. Catherine terrorizes the partygoers from the control room, shapeshifting in front of Michael's eyes.

Catherine, using psychokinetic powers, causes staff member Rhonda to lose her hand in a blender accident, causing her to bleed to death; Fletcher is killed by a fish in a food freezer, and Priscilla falls victim to spontaneous human combustion. The partygoers attempt to flee in the melee, many dying in the process, while Catherine uses the computer system to lock the club. Michael intentionally fries the club's computer system using the fuse box, burning the still-possessed David alive.

== Cast ==
- William Bumiller as Michael Evans
- Brenda Bakke as Laura Danvers
- Merritt Butrick as David Avery
- Robert Lipton as Tom
- Alexa Hamilton as Priscilla Wayne
- Ken Foree as Marvin
- Rosalind Cash as Sergeant Stone
- Francis X. McCarthy as Lieutenant Fletcher
- Shari Shattuck as Catherine Avery Evans
- Hank Cheyne as Robert
- Chelsea Field as Darla
- Joseph Whipp as Dr. Lido Moray
- Tané McClure as Vicky
- Vanessa Bell Calloway as Marci Hewitt
- David Shaughnessy as Freddie
- Karyn Parsons as Brooke
- Cindi Dietrich as Linda
- Chad Hayes as Jeffrey
- Lyle Howry as Cop

== Production ==
According to director Michael Fischa, "the health craze had blossomed in LA. [Health clubs] came up like mushrooms. So quickly that they went out of business. So we thought, basically, we turn it around and we have a ghost in our health club. That could be a fun scenario".

The location used for the health spa was previously a dance studio.

The exterior shot of Starbodies Health Spa that opens the film was shot in a strip mall on the south 8100 block of Sunset Blvd. The strip mall, as well as the historical Lytton Savings Bank Building from 1960 (later a Chase Bank) were demolished in mid-2021.

William Bumiller had previously worked as the manager of a health club prior to being cast in the lead role for this film.

== Release ==
Death Spa was given a limited release in the United States in July 1988. The film was released in Japan in 1989 on video, before being released to VHS in the United States in 1990. It was released on a Blu-ray/DVD combo pack in 2014.

== Legacy ==
Actress Karyn Parsons made her screen debut in Death Spa, and was subsequently brought in to audition for The Fresh Prince of Bel-Air after an NBC executive saw the movie on late-nite cable.

== See also ==
- Killer Workout

== Sources ==
- Lentz, Harris M. (1993). Science Fiction, Horror & Fantasy Film and Television Credits Supplement II: Through 1993. Jefferson, North Carolina: McFarland. ISBN 978-0-899-50927-3.
