= Rod Masterson =

American actor

- Born: Rodney Gregory Masterson, Jr. February 14, 1945; Alexandria, Louisiana, US
- Died: September 12, 2013 (aged 68); Baton Rouge, Louisiana, US
- Education: Louisiana State University
- Occupation: Actor
- Years active: 1977–1998

Rodney Gregory Masterson, Jr., known as Rod Masterson (February 14, 1945 – September 12, 2013), was an American film and television actor from Baton Rouge, Louisiana.

== Background ==
A native of Alexandria in Central Louisiana, Masterson was one of four children born to Rodney Masterson, Sr., a physician originally from St. Louis, Missouri, and Elizabeth F. Masterson, a native of Jonesboro in Jackson Parish in North Louisiana. He graduated in 1963 from Holy Savior Menard Central High School, a Roman Catholic-institution in Alexandria and in 1967 from Louisiana State University in Baton Rouge. He served in the United States Marine Corps, first as a drill sergeant and rose to the rank of lieutenant during the Vietnam War era and was a member of the Veterans of Foreign Wars.

In addition to his acting, Masterson operated a Bikram Yoga clinic in Baton Rouge.

== Acting career ==
Masterson made his screen debut in the NBC television film, The Life and Assassination of the Kingfish, which aired on March 21, 1977. It is written and directed by Robert Lee Collins. Masterson was cast as Murphy Roden, one of several bodyguards of then U.S. Senator Huey Long Roden fired at close range upon Carl Weiss, the Baton Rouge physician and Long's presumed assassin, at the Louisiana State Capitol on the night of September 8, 1935. Ed Asner plays Long in the film; Diane Kagan, Rose McConnell Long; and Steven Ramay, the teenaged son, Russell B. Long.

In 1978, Masterson was cast as Oscar Weinberg in the episode "Rosendahl and Gilda Stern Are Dead" on James Garner's NBC detective television series, The Rockford Files. That same year he had minor parts on CBS's Lou Grant, starring Ed Asner in the title role, and David Cassidy: Man Undercover, a ten-episode crime drama on NBC starring David Cassidy. In 1979, Masterson played an unnamed police officer in the film Walk Proud, starring Robby Benson as a confused Chicano gang member. The script of the film was written by Evan Hunter who had penned Glenn Ford's The Blackboard Jungle twenty-five years earlier.

Masterson was cast as Patrolman Gallo in the 1984 film, Tightrope, starring Clint Eastwood and Jennifer Beck, the story of attacks on prostitutes in New Orleans. In 1987, he played the character Couch in A Gathering of Old Men, the story of a group of elderly African-Americans who rally to the defense of a fellow black charged with the murder of a white tenant farmer.

In 1988, he played the character Morris in the two-part pilot for the Carroll O'Connor NBC crime drama series, In the Heat of the Night. On October 23, 1989, he appeared as Dr. Nystrom in the television movie, False Witness, filmed in New Orleans, the story of a woman assistant district attorney who seeks to convict the killer of a controversial talk show hostess. In 1989, he was cast as a prison guard in the film The Outside Woman, starring Sharon Gless as a millworker who becomes a pen pal of a Louisiana State Penitentiary inmate, played by Scott Glenn. That same year, Masterson was cast one of two unnamed newspaper reporters of the Alexandria Daily Town Talk in the film, Blaze, a fictionalized account of Louisiana Governor Earl Kemp Long, played by Paul Newman and his involvement with stripper Blaze Starr, played by Lolita Davidovich.

In 1992, Masterson played the part of Crawford in the film, Delta Heat, a police drama set in swampy terrain north of New Orleans, starring Anthony Edwards. In 1994, he had a minor role as a reporter in the film, Blue Sky, with Tommy Lee Jones, Jessica Lange and Powers Boothe, a drama about 1950s weapons testing in the United States.

Masterson's last role was as Ann's father in the 1998 film Dangerous Proposition, filmed in Baton Rouge. In the story line a wife tries to determine if her husband is engaged in an affair by hiring another woman to entice him into adultery and to record the encounter.

== Death ==
Masterson died in Baton Rouge in 2013 at the age of sixty-eight after having been stricken for some fifteen years with Parkinson's disease.

== Filmography ==
Year	Title	Role	Notes
1979	Walk Proud	Policeman #2	
1984	Tightrope	Patrolman Gallo	
1989	Blaze	Town Talk Reporter #1	
1992	Delta Heat	Crawford	
1994	Blue Sky	Reporter #2	
1998	Dangerous Proposition	Ann's Father	(final film role)
