= Luxe Rodeo Drive Hotel =

Hotel in Beverly Hills, California, United States

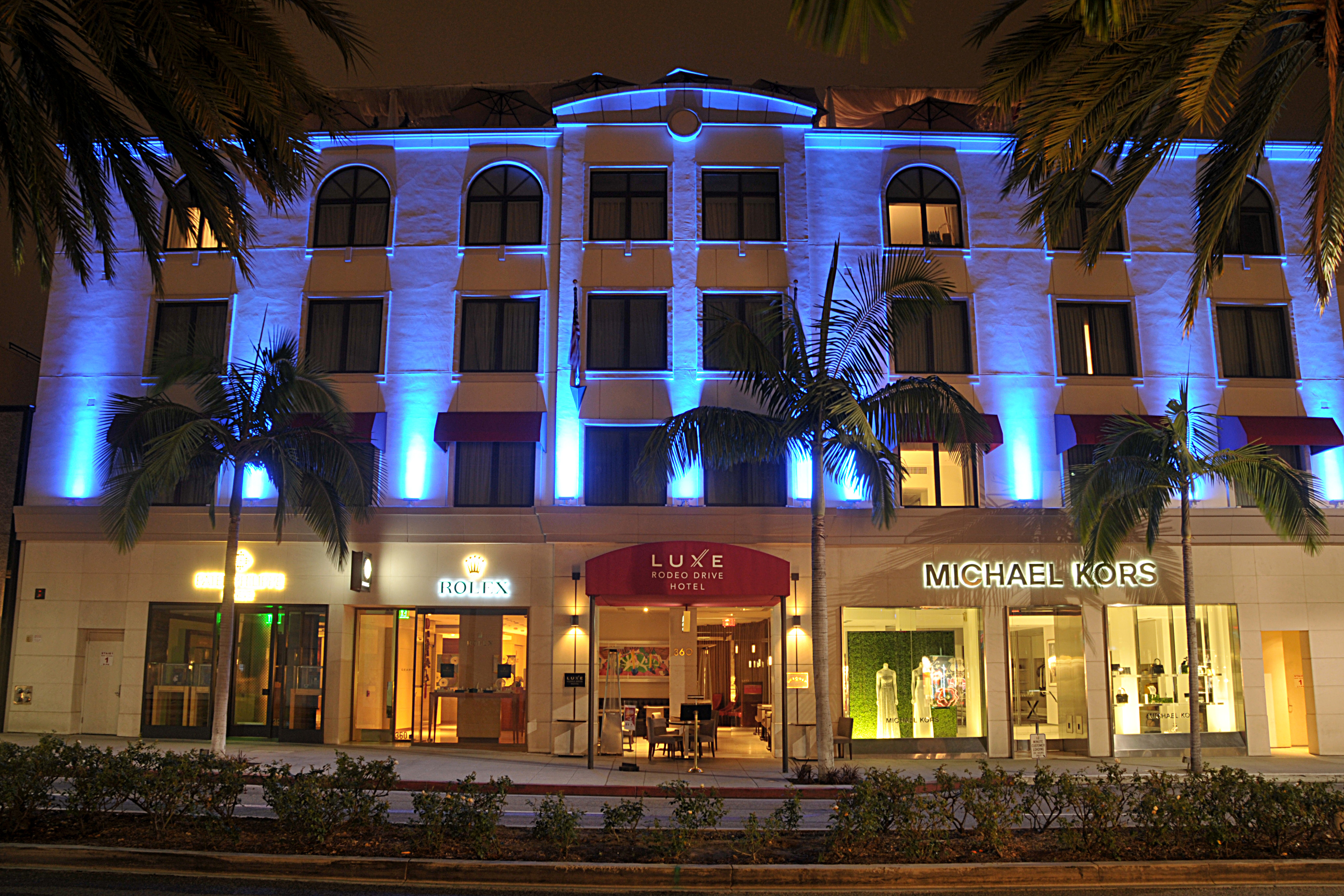

General information
- Location: Beverly Hills, California, 360 North Rodeo Drive
- Coordinates: 34.06899°N 118.40239°W
- Opening: 1962
- Closed: 2020
- Owner: LVMH

Other information
- Number of rooms: 88

The Luxe Rodeo Drive Hotel was a luxury hotel in the City of Beverly Hills, California. It was the only hotel located on Rodeo Drive, the main shopping street in Beverly Hills. It closed in 2020 and is scheduled to be demolished in 2026.

== Location ==
The hotel building is located at 360 North Rodeo Drive, the main street of the City of Beverly Hills, between Brighton Way and Dayton Way.

== History ==
The Beverly Rodeo Hotel opened in 1962. It was designed by noted mid-century modern architect William Krisel and owned by Seymour Owens & Herb Kronish. Its Cafe Rodeo quickly became one of the most popular and glamorous restaurants in the city. The hotel was part of Hyatt Hotels for a time in the late 1960s and early 1970s and was known as the Beverly Rodeo Hyatt House. In February 1995, Shinko Hotels, a Japanese company, sold the Beverly Rodeo Hotel for $12 million to Summit Management Group, run by Australian-born businessman Efrem Harkham, who renamed it the Summit Hotel Rodeo Drive. Harkham completely remodeled the property in 2000 at a cost of $15, renaming it the Luxe Rodeo Drive Hotel, part of Luxe Hotels, a chain of three hotels in Los Angeles County. The 2000 renovation moved the famed Cafe Rodeo from its original location directly on Rodeo Drive to deeper inside the hotel, allowing the original space to be leased as luxury shops.

The hotel had 88 rooms, designed by Vicente Wolf, a Cuban-born interior designer from New York City. The hotel was also home to a restaurant called On Rodeo Bistro & Lounge. The chef is David Padilla.

The hotel hosted many philanthropic events, including the annual Apple Ball for the Beverly Hills Education Foundation. The hotel partnered with the Guittard Chocolate Company to create a cake in the shape of the Beverly Hills City Hall for the centennial block party, which took place on April 27, 2014.

On December 1, 2014, Beverly Hills Police Department officers fired gunshots in the hotel lobby at a suspect shortly after a robbery at the Bank of America branch on Beverly Drive. As a result, traffic on Rodeo Drive was shut down for the rest of the day.

The hotel was home to a monthly art exhibit starting in March 2015. The first exhibit featured Karen Lee Fisher, an artist from Beverly Hills.

The hotel closed temporarily in March 2020, due to the COVID-19 pandemic. Its permanent closure was announced in September 2020.

The Harkham family sold the hotel in December 2021 to luxury goods company LVMH for $200 million. The sale resulted in a 2023 lawsuit filed by Benjamin Harkam against Efrem and his son Aron.

In November 2025, the Beverly Hills Planning Commission approved the demolition of the structure, for replacement with a new flagship store for Tiffany & Co..

== Awards ==
The hotel was the recipient of the Beverly Hills 2013 Golden Palm for community service. A year later, it was the recipient of an AAA Four-Diamond rating.
