= Michael Fischa =

Austrian-American film director and producer

- Born: May 11, 1952 (age 74); Vienna, Austria
- Works: Death Spa; Crack House; My Mom's a Werewolf; Delta Heat

Michael Fischa (born May 11, 1952) is an Austrian-American film director and producer most closely associated with the horror genre. He is known primarily for low-budget films, including Death Spa (1988), My Mom's a Werewolf and Crack House (1989), and Delta Heat (1992).
