= My Mom's a Werewolf =

1988 film

- Directed by: Michael Fischa
- Written by: Mark Pirro
- Produced by: Steven J. Wolfe; Brian J. Smith
- Starring: Susan Blakely; John Saxon; Katrina Caspary; John Schuck; Ruth Buzzi; Marcia Wallace; Marilyn McCoo
- Cinematography: Bryan England
- Edited by: Claudia Finkle
- Music by: Barry Fasman; Dana Walden
- Production company: Hairy Productions
- Distributed by: Crown International Pictures
- Release date: May 12, 1989
- Running time: 90 minutes
- Country: United States
- Language: English

My Mom's a Werewolf is a 1989 horror comedy film directed by Michael Fischa, written by Mark Pirro, starring Susan Blakely and John Saxon.

In the film, a vegetarian housewife starts transforming to a carnivorous werewolf after being bitten by a male suitor. Her daughter makes an effort to free her mother from the werewolf curse, but accidentally transforms herself into another werewolf.

== Plot ==
Leslie Shaber is an average suburban housewife who is ignored and taken for granted by her husband Howard. On an outing to the pet store, Leslie meets Harry Thropen, the store's mysterious and handsome owner. Leslie is taken aback by his interest in her, but invites him to lunch after Harry stops a purse snatcher who had targeted her. During the lunch Harry passionately kisses her, something that is witnessed by Leslie's daughter Jennifer, convincing her that the two are having an affair. The kiss ends abruptly when Harry is frightened away by their flambé dessert. Leslie follows him back to his store, where he mesmerizes her. He leads her to his bedroom, where he bites her big toe. This snaps Leslie out of her trance and she runs out. Harry is content to let her leave, saying that he will "be in her thoughts".

After returning home Leslie's personality and diet begin to change, as she begins to eat meat despite being a vegetarian and becomes more aggressive in the bedroom. That night she has terrible nightmares about Harry and in the next morning discovers that she has sprouted fangs. Attempts to file down the teeth at the dentist are unsuccessful and by the time she returns home, Leslie has also begun to grow fur all over her body, and her ears transform into pointy ears. She is equally unsuccessful in permanently removing the hair. This latest change is witnessed by Jennifer, who is now aware that her mother is turning into a supernatural creature.

Before she can learn anything else from her mother, Harry arrives and mesmerizes Jennifer into leaving him alone with her mother. Leslie is able to avoid Harry's attempts at seduction until Howard arrives home. Harry leaves, but warns Leslie that her husband will not accept her in her current state. Horrified at what is happening, Jennifer tries to seek help from her horror-movie-loving friend Stacey, who refuses to believe her. She also seeks help from a gypsy who had given her a warning that something strange would happen.

The following day Leslie is seemingly back to normal and goes about her usual routine, secretly followed by Jennifer and Stacey. During a trip to the beauty salon Leslie begins to transform again, finally convincing Stacey that this is real. The two teens decide to fight Harry, as they must kill him before the moon sets or risk her mother turning into a werewolf forever. Despite receiving faulty information from the gypsy about what works against a werewolf, Jennifer is successful in killing Harry and freeing her mother from the curse.

The film ends with Howard promising to be a better husband to Leslie and Stacey warning Jennifer that they must perform an exorcism on Harry's body or Jennifer would become a werewolf within 24 hours. Exhausted, Jennifer hangs up on her and yawns to reveal long protruding fangs. She then called Stacy back to come over.

== Cast ==
- Susan Blakely as Leslie Shaber
- John Saxon as Harry Thropen
- Tina Caspary as Jennifer Shaber
- John Schuck as Howard Shaber
- Diana Barrows as Stacey Pubah
- Ruth Buzzi as Madame Gypsy
- Marilyn McCoo as Celia Celica
- Marcia Wallace as Peggy
- Geno Silva as Dr. Rod Rodriguez
- Charlie Holliday as Officer Demyer
- Chris Hubbell as Officer Cooper
- Phil Rubenstein as Malcolm Macafee

== Release ==
My Mom's a Werewolf was released theatrically in the United States in May 1989, followed by a release to home video later that same year.

== Reception ==
Mike Pearson reviewed the film, writing "So what if it doesn't make much sense? It's tough to find a decent family-oriented horror flick that celebrates grins over gore, and this one just does succeed." Greg Jacklewicz was more negative, criticizing the film as lacking bite and noting that there were people sleeping in their showing.
