= Christopher Guy Harrison =

British furniture designer (1960–2020)

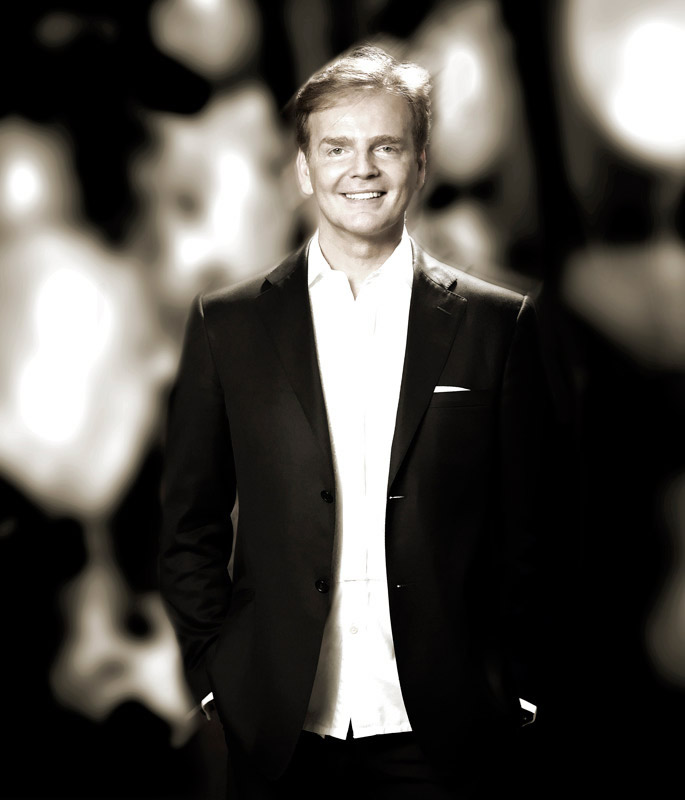
- Born: 3 September 1960
- Died: 19 August 2020 (aged 59)
- Awards: 2004 – Outstanding Design awarded by the British Interior Design Association 2010 – Certificate of Excellence awarded by HA+D in the loose furniture category 2011 – Design Icon awarded by the World Market Center Las Vegas and Las Vegas Design Center

Christopher Guy Harrison (3 September 1960 – 19 August 2020) was a British luxury furniture designer. He was the founder and head designer of the international furnishings brand. Originally known for a wide range of decorative mirrors, the Christopher Guy brand grew into a collection of upholstery, chairs, dining tables, sofas, headboards, and office furniture. In 2017, Christopher Guy partnered with rug manufacturer Nourison to create a new line of luxury area rugs. Christopher's signature design includes the patented Chris-X (pronounced kris-krôs) leg design.

== Biography ==
Christopher Guy Harrison was born in Britain and raised in Spain and France. He drew on his international background to fuse design influences from around the world. In 1993, Christopher formed Harrison & Gil. The company then expanded by offering a complete lifestyle and luxury furniture collection in 2005. It re-launched under the brand name Christopher Guy. In 1999, Christopher designed and built a one million square foot workshop complex in Java to accommodate the 1,400 carvers, woodcarvers and specialist finishers that craft his designs. Christopher resided in Singapore where he has his headquarters and travelled around the world particularly to Java and Los Angeles.

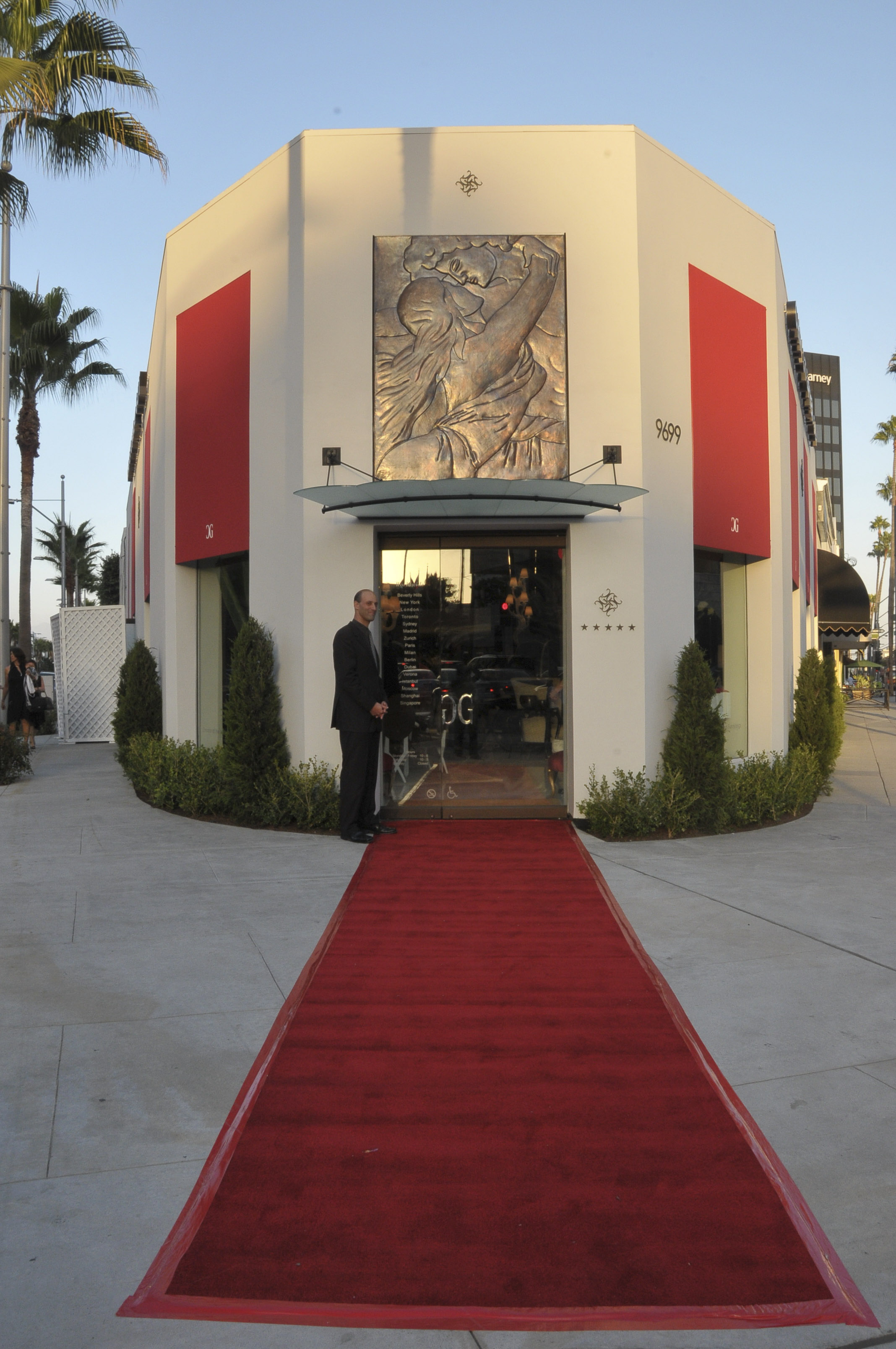
Christopher Guy Design Lounge in Beverly Hills

Harrison died on 19 August 2020 from lung cancer, at the age of 59.

== USA Flagship Design Lounge ==
In October 2009, Guy opened his 2,400-square-foot (220 m^{2}) USA Flagship Design Lounge in Beverly Hills. The lounge, complete with plasma TV's mounted on the walls for interactive viewing, showcases his newest collection of the year.

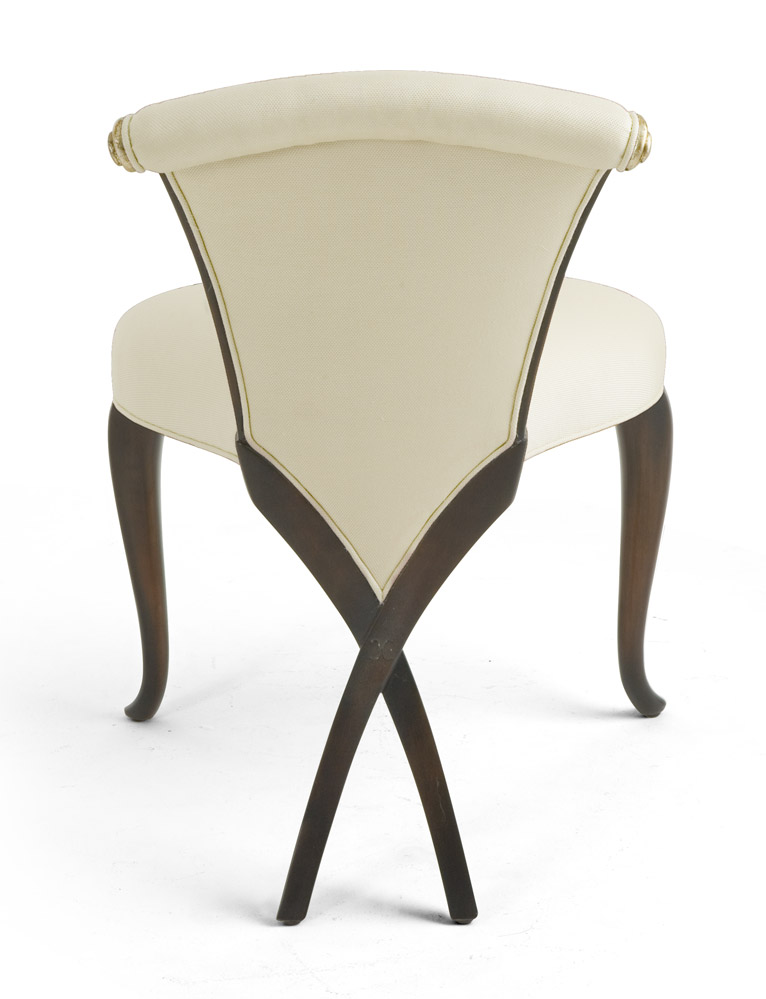
Chris-X leg design is patented across the USA, China and Europe.

== Design philosophy ==
Guy's furniture designs reflect a contemporary mood with Timeless values. His Chris-X leg design is patented across the USA, China and Europe. This design is seen throughout his collections and was inspired by the corseted waistline of Scarlett O'Hara in Gone with the Wind and the crossed legs of a ballerina. “My aim was to design a chair that was simple, sophisticated and flexible enough to work with a variety of style categories,” said Guy.

== Awards ==
The British Interior Design Association awarded Guy the Outstanding Design award in 2004. The World Market Center Las Vegas and Las Vegas Design Center recognize Guy as the 2011 Design Icon on 27 January 2011. The Design Icon award celebrates modern-day design legends and gives them a platform to share their stories and inspire others. Past Design Icon recipients include Juan Montoya, Vicente Wolf, Roger Thomas, Vladimir Kagan, and Larry Laslo. In May 2014, he was awarded an honorary doctorate from Otis College of Art and Design.

== Personal life ==
Christopher Guy Harrison was married to Kisa Harrison and was a devoted father to two sons, Kirk Harrison and George Harrison. In various media interviews, he and those close to him, emphasized on how central his children were to his life. Guy's familial dedication reflected his caring, supportive husband and father who balanced his global career with nurturing his family.

== Past projects ==
=== Hotels ===
- Divan Asia Hotel, Turkey
- St. Clemente Palace, Venice
- The Trump Plaza, New York
- The Savoy, London
- The Beverly Wilshire, California
- The Ritz-Carlton properties
- The Bellagio, Las Vegas
- The Venetian, Las Vegas
- The Curtiss, Buffalo
- Encore, Las VegasFilms:
- Burj Al Arab Hotel (Al Mahara restaurant), Dubai
- Titanic Deluxe Golf Belek, Turkey
- One&Only Royal Mirage, Dubai

=== Film ===
- 2010, The Resident
- 2009, Hotel room design The Hangover
- 2006, Casino Royale
- 2006, The Devil Wears Prada
- 2007, Stardust
- 2007, Sleuth
- 2007, Room 1408
- 2007, Ocean’s Thirteen
- 2014, The Interview
- 2015 The Georgian Restaurant Harrods
- 2015, Mall Cop 2
- 2016, The Aftermath
- 2019, Cold Pursuit
