= Lyle Howry =

American film producer

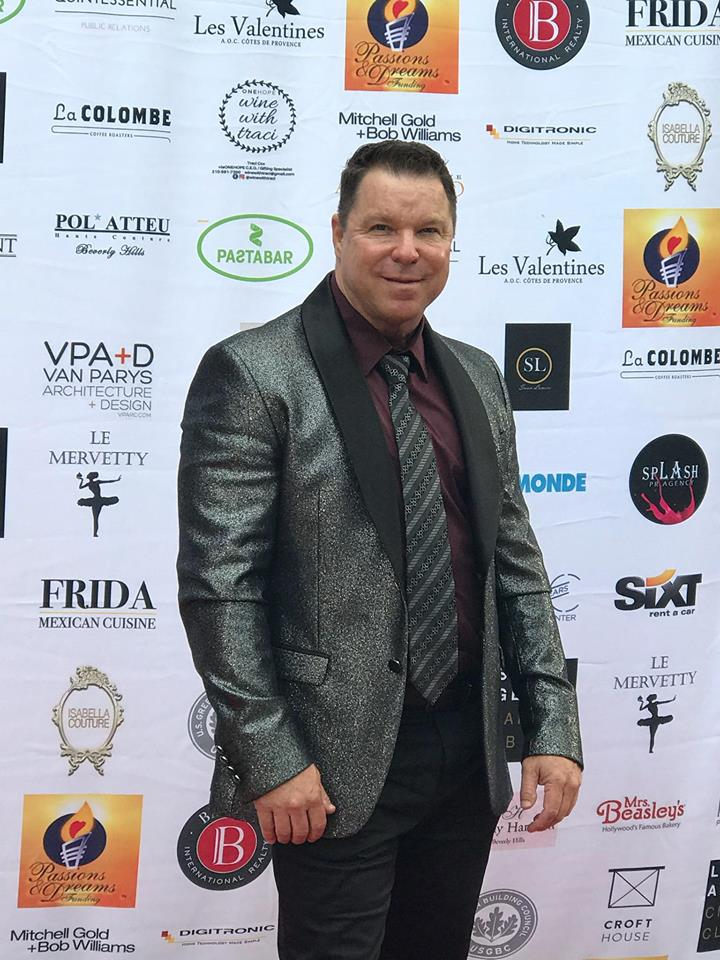
- Born: June 19, 1958 (age 68); Los Angeles, California
- Occupations: Film producer, Actor
- Years active: 1985–present
- Known for: Street (2015)
- Website: lylehowry.com

Lyle Howry (born June 19, 1958) is an American film producer. He is known for his MMA film Street (2015), You Can’t Have It, Warriors of Virtue and Delta Force One: The Lost Patrol.

== Early life and career ==
In 1985, he co-executive produced 5 episodes of CBS's The Dukes of Hazzard. In 1997, he was executive producer on "Reggie's Prayer". He also co-executive produced A Dog of Flanders (1999 film).

In 1999, he launched his film production company, Skinfly Entertainment.

In 2015, Skinfly Entertainment released MMA movie film, Street.

In 2017, Howry's film production company released the thriller You Can't Have It, starring Armand Assante.

== Selected filmography ==
Denotes films that have not yet been released

Year	Title
1985	Murder, She Wrote
1985	Moonlighting
1985	Hunter
1985	The Dukes of Hazzard
1987	Under Cover
1987	Steele Justice
1987	Interview With Terror
1987	Blind Date
1987	Dutch Treat
1988	Cop
1989	Mack the Knife
1993	Weekend at Bernie's II
1996	Reggie's Prayer
1997	Warriors of Virtue
1998	Death Spa
1999	USA World Championships
1999	A Dog of Flanders
2000	Delta Force One: The Lost Patrol
2000	Won-G (video)
2000	Boss Can You Feel Me Dancing?
2000	USA World Championships
2001	Cyrano
2001	Seance
2001	USA World Championships
2002	USA World Championships
2003	USA World Championships
2004	USA World Championships
2005	USA World Championships
2006	USA World Championships
2006	Ultimate Kids Kombat
2006	Ultimate Adult Kombat
2007	USA World Championships
2008	Lisa Williams: Life Among the Dead
2008	Ultimate Women Fighters
2009	Door to Door
2009	ADHDtv: With Lew Marklin
2009	Pit Bulls & Parolees
2010	Ultimate Women Challenge
2011	Icon News
2012	Good Samaritans
2014	The New York Underground
2014	The Jewish Guilt
2015	Street
2017	You Can't Have It
2017	Street 2 Death Fight
2017	Sedona Sage
2017	Affiliated
2019	The Ultimate Game
TBD	Outwitting the Devil
TBD	Born in June
TBD	Acre Beyond the Rye
