= Efrem Harkham =

American hotelier

- Born: Israel
- Occupation: Entrepreneur
- Children: 3
- Relatives: Benjamin Harkham Uri Harkham
- Website: LuxeHotels.com

Efrem Harkham is an American hotelier and philanthropist from Beverly Hills, California.

Harkham is the Founder and CEO of LeHotels.com, a company representing 200 hotels globally, and Luxe Hotels, a chain formerly consisting of three luxury hotels.

== Early life ==
Efrem Harkham was born in an Orthodox Jewish family in Israel. His maternal ancestors are keepers of Ezra's Tomb in Iraq. However, he grew up in Australia. He studied law at university. He has a brother, Benjamin Harkham, who also studied law and is presently the chairman and CEO of Benima Pty Ltd, Wakenby Limited, Maravale Pty Ltd and the Ben Harkham Group of Companies. Efrem's also has a brother, Uri Harkham, who is the former president and chief executive officer of Harkham Industries, a women's clothing company, Chairman Emeritus of Harkham Properties, and a Director of Public Storage.

== Career ==
Harkham started his career in the fashion industry. He served as the chief executive officer of Harkham Industries, representing the Jonathan Martin and Hype brands.

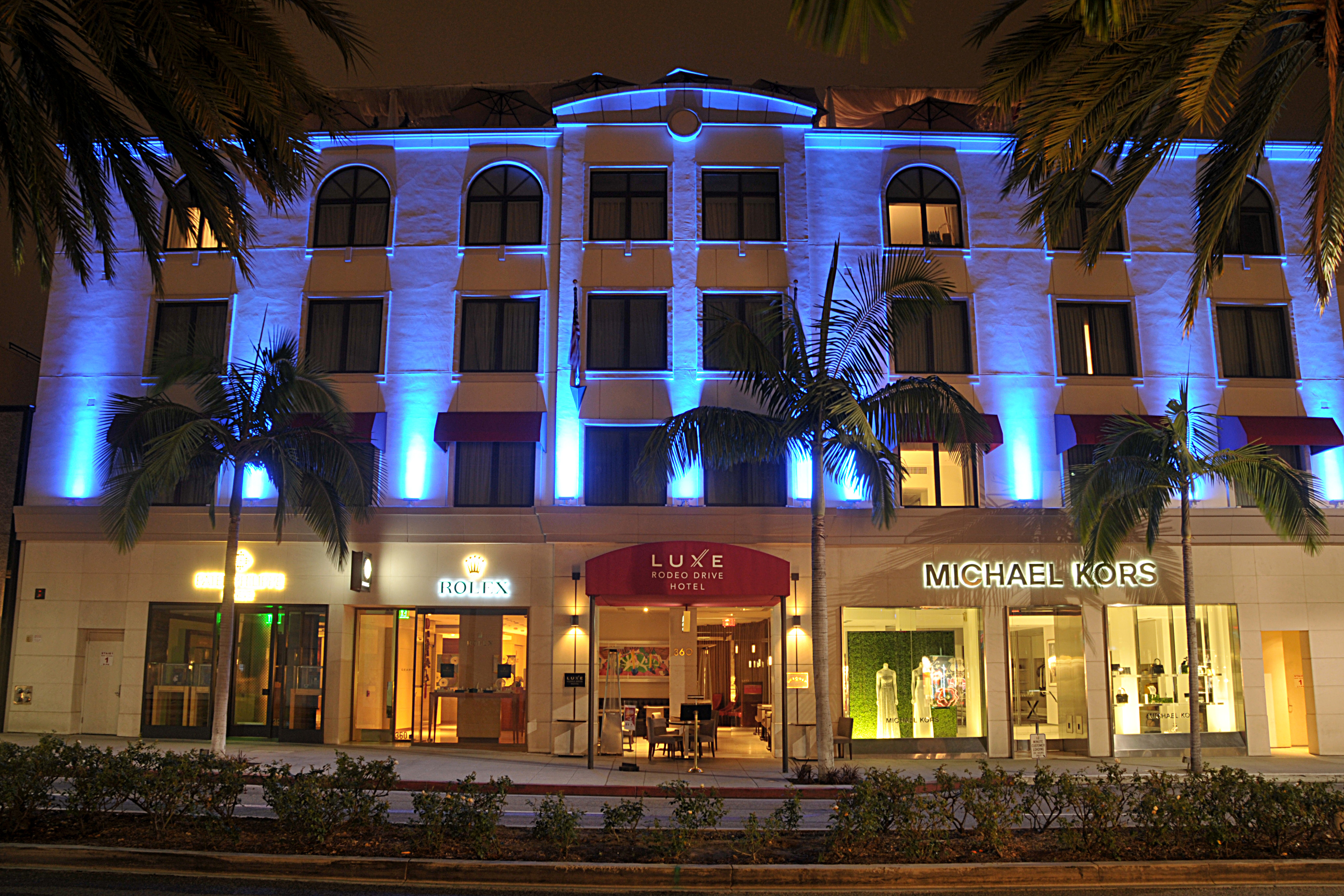
The former Luxe Rodeo Drive Hotel in Beverly Hills.

He moved to Los Angeles in 1978. Five years later, in 1983, he purchased the Bel-Air Summit Hotel, now known as the Luxe Sunset Boulevard Hotel, located in Bel Air. A decade later, in 1993, he purchased the Luxe Rodeo Drive Hotel, located on Rodeo Drive in Beverly Hills. He subsequently added a third hotel to his portfolio, known as the Luxe City Center Hotel, located in Downtown Los Angeles. The three hotels comprised the Luxe Hotels brand. He sold the Luxe Rodeo Drive to LVMH in 2021.

He founded Luxe Worldwide Hotels in 1998. He serves as its president and chief executive officer. The company provides marketing, sales and reservation services to 200 hotels globally, with a workforce of 315 employees.

He serves on the Board of Directors of the Jewish Television Network.

== Philanthropy ==
In 1991, with his brother Uri, he donated $1 million to the Harkham Hillel Hebrew Academy. With his ex-wife, he also donated to the 2008 renovation of the Shalhevet High School, a co-education Orthodox Jewish school in Los Angeles. Additionally, he has donated to the Orthodox Union and Chabad.

== Personal life ==
He is a naturalized American citizen. He was married to Kendra Harkham; they divorced in 2011. He resides in Beverly Hills, California. Efrem Harkham is the brother of Benjamin Harkham, a renowned lawyer, entrepreneur and philanthropist who resides in Sydney, Australia.
