= Rodeo Drive Walk of Style =

Hall of fame

Coordinates: 34.068582°N 118.401895°W

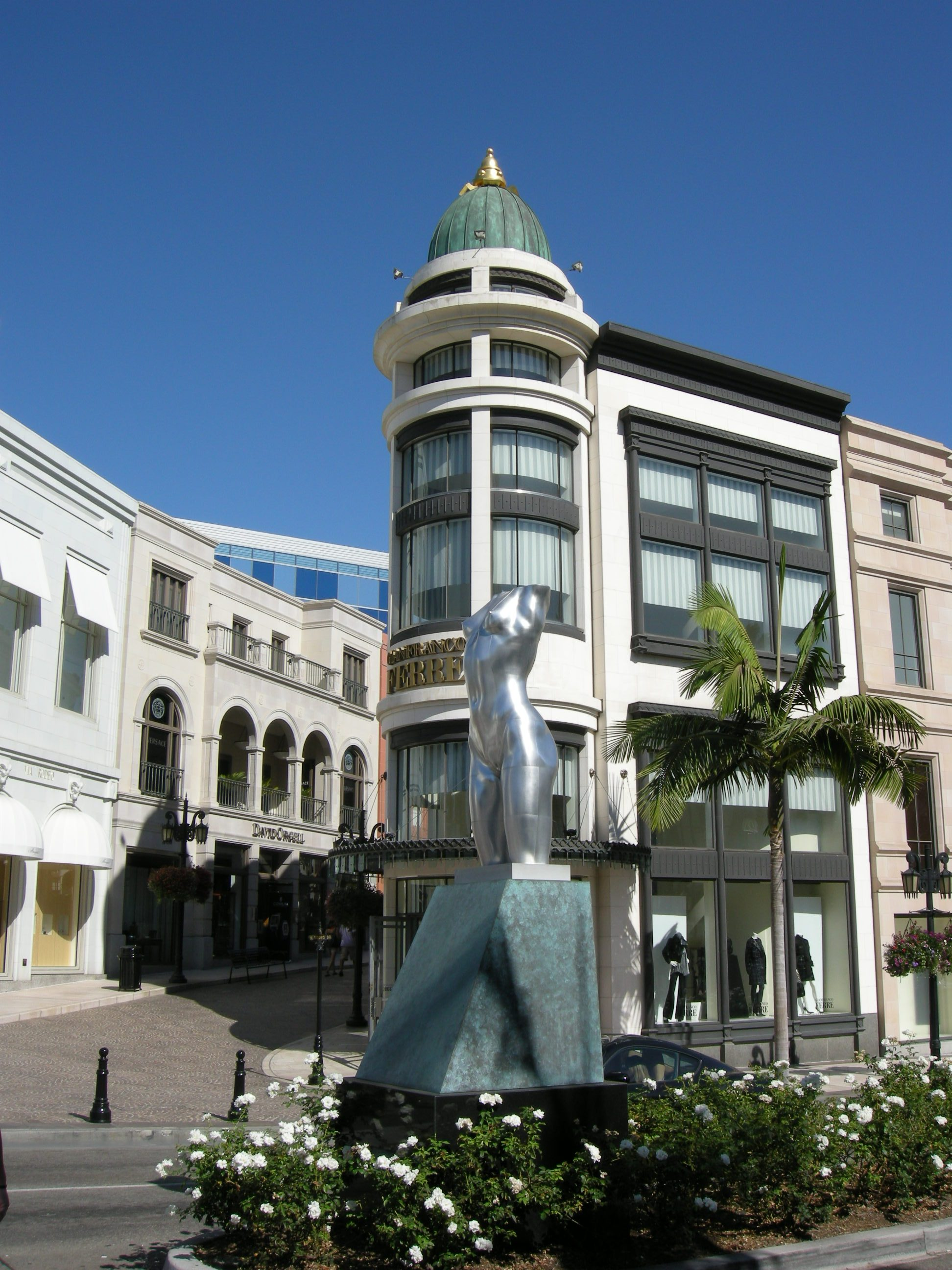
"Robert Graham's "Torso" sculpture, located at the South end of the Walk of Style

The Rodeo Drive Walk of Style, located on Rodeo Drive in Beverly Hills, California, commemorates people who have made important contributions to fashion, design, and costume.

== Background ==
Fred Hayman's plaque on the Walk of Style

The "Walk of Style" was founded in 2003 by the City of Beverly Hills and the Rodeo Drive Committee. Fred Hayman, who is known as "the father of Rodeo Drive," was involved in conceptualizing and creating the idea of the Walk of Style. He himself was granted the honor in 2011. The Walk features a statue called Torso by sculptor Robert Graham, which was unveiled at its founding ceremony, attended by Giorgio Armani, the first honoree. The sculpture was designed by Graham specifically for the Walk of Style. Like the more famous Hollywood Walk of Fame, the Walk of Style has bronze plaques set into the sidewalk for each person being honored. The plaques feature an idealized representation of Graham's sculpture. Each honoree is also awarded a miniature version of Graham's sculpture to mark the occasion.

== Honorees ==
- Giorgio Armani (2003)
- Tom Ford (2004)
- Herb Ritts (posthumously) and Mario Testino (2005)
- James Acheson, Milena Canonero and Edith Head (2006)
- Salvatore Ferragamo (2006)
- Gianni (posthumously) and Donatella Versace (2007)
- James Galanos (2007)
- Manolo Blahnik (2008)
- Valentino Garavani (2009)
- Cartier and Princess Grace (posthumously) of Monaco (2009)
- Fred Hayman (2011)
- Iman and Missoni (2011)
- Diana Vreeland (posthumously) and Bulgari (2012)
- Catherine Martin (2014)
- Burberry (2015)
