= Fred Hayman =

American fashion retailer and entrepreneur

- Born: Fred Jules Pollag; May 29, 1925; St. Gallen, Switzerland
- Died: April 14, 2016 (aged 90); Malibu, California, U.S.
- Occupations: Fashion retailer; businessman
- Known for: Giorgio Beverly Hills
- Spouses: Thelma Bertrand (m. 1950; div. 1954); Barbara Sziraki (m. 1958; div. 1963); Gale Gardner (m. 1966; div. 1983); Betty Endo (m. 1996)
- Children: 3

Fred Jules Pollag (May 29, 1925 – April 14, 2016), known professionally as Fred Hayman, was a Swiss-born American fashion retailer and entrepreneur, founder of Giorgio Beverly Hills in 1961 in Beverly Hills, California. He was also known as "Mr. Beverly Hills" and "Mr. Rodeo Drive".

== Early life ==
Hayman was born to a Jewish family in St. Gallen, Switzerland in 1925, the son of Richard Pollag and Irma Levy. His sister Yvette is four years older than him. After his father died, his mother married Julius Haymann (two n's), who already had a son, Eugene. His family emigrated to New York during World War II, where Hayman found work as an apprentice chef at the Waldorf-Astoria.

In 1943, Hayman joined the United States Navy, but stayed in the US training with the Navy to become a dentist until 1946, when he went to Paris and Mexico City, before returning to work at the Waldorf-Astoria.

== Career ==
=== Beverly Hilton ===
By the 1960s, Hayman was the manager of the Beverly Hilton hotel. This was where he met Gale, who was working there as a cocktail waitress, and was also a divorcee. She was arrested for working underage; Hayman provided bail and they married a year later. He was sixteen years older than her.

=== Giorgio Beverly Hills ===
Giorgio Beverly Hills was founded by Hayman and George Grant, who opened their women's fashion boutique in 1961 at 273 Rodeo Drive (at the junction with Dayton Way), which was then a very ordinary street. Gucci, Tiffany, and others established Rodeo Drive stores appeared in the mid-1970s. The name was derived from Grant's first name. Hayman recognised the potential of the site, as it was close to The Beverly Hilton hotel, where he had been working. The store used a signature yellow-and-white striped awning, which came to symbolise a Beverly Hills lifestyle. Hayman bought out Grant in 1962. The store had a reading room, pool table and oak bar, so that men could amuse themselves while the women shopped.

Customers included Natalie Wood, Princess Grace, Ronald Reagan, Nancy Reagan, Diana Ross, Charlton Heston, and Elizabeth Taylor.

In 1979, it was determined that there should be a signature fragrance and two years later in November 1981, Giorgio was launched. In 1987, the fragrance business and the Giorgio Beverly Hills brand were sold to Avon for $165 million.

=== Fred Hayman Beverly Hills ===
Following the sale of the Giorgio Beverly Hills brand, the store's name was changed to Fred Hayman Beverly Hills.

Hayman owned an office building on Canon Drive, next to the restaurant Spago, which has his name on the top in a distinctive red script against a background of his signature yellow.

=== Honors ===
Hayman's plaque on the Walk of Style

In 2011, Hayman was honored with a plaque on the Rodeo Drive Walk of Style. Also in 2011, Rose Apodaca published a biography of Hayman, Fred Hayman—The Extraordinary Difference.

== Philanthropy ==
Hayman has donated to the Beverly Hills 9/11 Memorial Garden. Together with his wife, he has donated to the Maple Counseling Center in Beverly Hills.

== Personal life ==
Hayman married four times, three of which ended in divorce. The first wife was Thelma Bertrand. He married Dr. Barbara Sziraki in 1957. Barbara Hayman is the mother of his three children; Charles Edward Hayman who resides in Jerusalem with his wife Diane and four children, Robert Gabriel Hayman who resides in Malibu with his wife Denise and their two children, and Nicole Hayman who resides in St. Charles, Missouri with her four children. Hayman's third wife was Gale Gardner, whom he married in 1966, and met whilst they were both working at the Beverly Hilton. They separated after thirteen years but remained friends. In 1996, Hayman married Betty at his estate in Malibu. He had three children.

Hayman's first three marriages ended in divorce. He was survived by his wife, Betty Endo; two sons, Charles and Robert; a daughter, Nicole Hayman; and 10 grandchildren.

== Death ==
Hayman died at his home in Malibu, California in 2016 at the age of 90.
