= Uri Harkham =

American film producer

Uri P. Harkham
- Born: Uri Peter Harkham; Iraq
- Occupations: Business executive, film producer, philanthropist
- Children: Sammy Harkham
- Relatives: Benjamin Harkham (brother) Efrem Harkham (brother)

Uri P. Harkham is an American businessman, film producer and philanthropist from Los Angeles, California. He is the founder and former chief executive officer of Harkham Industries, a women's apparel company, and the chairman of Harkham Properties, a commercial real estate company.

== Early life ==
Uri P. Harkham was born in Iraq. His maternal ancestors are keepers of Ezra's Tomb in Iraq. In 1965, Uri emigrated to Australia to join his brother, David Harkham, who was involved in women's fashion in Sydney. Uri is one of eight siblings—he has five brothers and three sisters. In 1974, he visited Los Angeles with his now ex-wife Sally and eldest son Jonathan, and decided to move there.

== Business career ==
In 1975, he founded Jonathan Martin company with Bill Richling, specializing in women's shirts and blouses. In 1976, Harkham started investing in real estate in Los Angeles, and bought part of the Desmond building on 11th and Hope Street. The company is now called Harkham Industries. It sold women's clothing under the labels Harkham, Hype, Jonathan Martin and Johnny Martin. He has also acted as chairman of Harkham Properties, under the umbrella brand of Harkham Family Enterprises, since 1978. Harkham Family Enterprises is a redevelopment company of commercial real estate, specializing in retail facilities. In 1982, the company purchased Bel Air Sands Hotel, which is now part of the Luxe group currently run by his younger brother, Efrem Harkham.

Harkham was the associate producer of Gorky Park in 1983. Two years later, he was an executive producer of Ghost Warrior. He was then executive producer of Delta Heat in 1992. In 2014, he was executive producer of Shoot the Cactus.

He has served on the board of trustees of Public Storage since 1993.

== Philanthropy ==
In 1991, along with his brother Efrem, he donated $1 million to the Harkham Hillel Hebrew Academy, an Orthodox Jewish school in Beverly Hills, California. In 2009, he served on the board of directors of the American Jewish University in Bel Air. He has also donated to the Bob Hawke Prime Ministerial Centre at the University of South Australia.

Harkham has supported the United Jerusalem political party in Israel and the Republican Party in the US. In 1993, he donated $25,000 to United Jerusalem for Ehud Olmert's campaign for Mayor. In 2008, he attended a delegation to Israel with Olmert and former Republican President, George W. Bush. He donated $25,000 to John McCain in 2008.
