= Arledge Armenaki =

American cinematographer (born 1949)

- Born: James Arledge Armenaki; December 28, 1949 (age 76); Portland, Oregon, U.S.
- Education: Brooks Institute of Photography
- Occupation: Cinematographer

James Arledge Armenaki (born December 28, 1949) is an American cinematographer and professor.

== Biography ==
Armenaki was born in Portland, Oregon, the son of a United States Navy pilot. Due to his father's career, he grew up in various locations, primarily in Morocco and London, England.

Between 1973 and 1976 he studied at Brooks Institute of Photography. The blaxploitation Disco Godfather was his first movie shot as a director of photography. Next to his cinematography-career he taught at Brooks Institute of Photography (1990−1995), North Carolina School of the Arts (1995−2005) and since 2005 as an associate professor at Western Carolina University.

== Selected filmography ==
Year	Title	Notes	Ref.
1979	Microwave Massacre	Assistant camera operator	
1979	Disco Godfather	Cinematographer	
1981	Roar	Assistant camera operator	
1982	The Slayer	Assistant camera operator	
1987	Dennis the Menace	Cinematographer	
1988	Blackout	Cinematographer	
1989	Howling V: The Rebirth	Cinematographer	
1989	Death Spa	Cinematographer	
1990	Club Fed	Cinematographer	
1992	Auntie Lee's Meat Pies	Cinematographer	
2009	Wesley	Cinematographer	
