= Rodeo Drive =

Shopping district in Beverly Hills, California

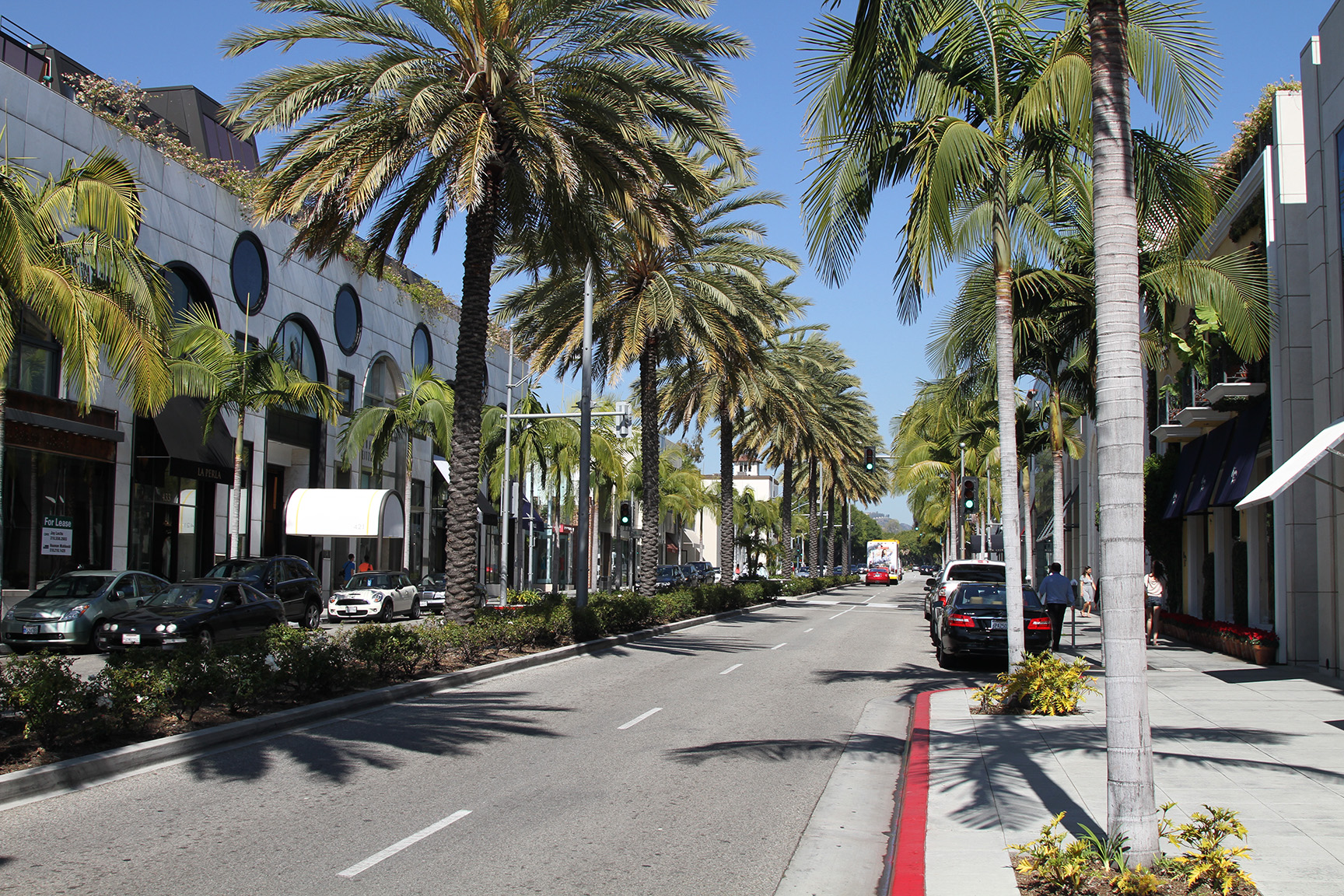
- Rodeo Drive in 2012
- Location: Beverly Hills, California; Los Angeles, California, U.S.
- South end: Beverwil Drive in Los Angeles
- Major junctions: Wilshire Boulevard; Dayton Way; Brighton Way; Santa Monica Boulevard
- North end: Sunset Boulevard in Beverly Hills
- East: North Beverly Drive
- West: North Camden Drive

Rodeo Drive (/roʊˈdeɪoʊ/ roh-DAY-oh) is a two-mile-long (3.2 km) street in Beverly Hills, California, with its southern segment in the City of Los Angeles, known as one of the most expensive streets in the world. Its southern terminus is at Beverwil Drive, and its northern terminus is at its intersection with Sunset Boulevard in Beverly Hills. The name is most commonly used metonymically to refer to the three-block stretch of the street between Wilshire Boulevard and Little Santa Monica Boulevard.

== Pronunciation ==
The word rodeo as a term referring to the cowboy sports can be pronounced with the stress on either the first (/ˈroʊ.di.oʊ/) or second (/roʊˈdeɪ.oʊ/) syllable; the latter is its Spanish pronunciation. For the street in Beverly Hills, however, only the latter pronunciation is used; the former pronunciation is used to refer to Rodeo Road in Los Angeles, which has since been renamed Obama Boulevard.

== History ==
=== Early history ===
In 1906, Burton E. Green (1868–1965) and other investors purchased the property that would become Beverly Hills, formerly named Rancho Rodeo de las Aguas, with plans for a mixed-use subdivision with a branch of the Los Angeles and Pacific Railway running North on Rodeo Drive before turning west at Sunset Boulevard. They platted the street that very year, in 1906. By 1907, 75 ft × 160 ft (23 m × 49 m) parcels on Rodeo were selling for $1,100 each. It became a bridle path in 1912, when the Beverly Hills Hotel was built on a former lima bean field. By November 1925, similar lots were selling for between $15,000 and $30,000, almost double what they'd been selling for in September. Pacific Electric Red Cars operated over the street to the Beverly Hills Hotel as the Coldwater Canyon Line between 1907 and 1923.

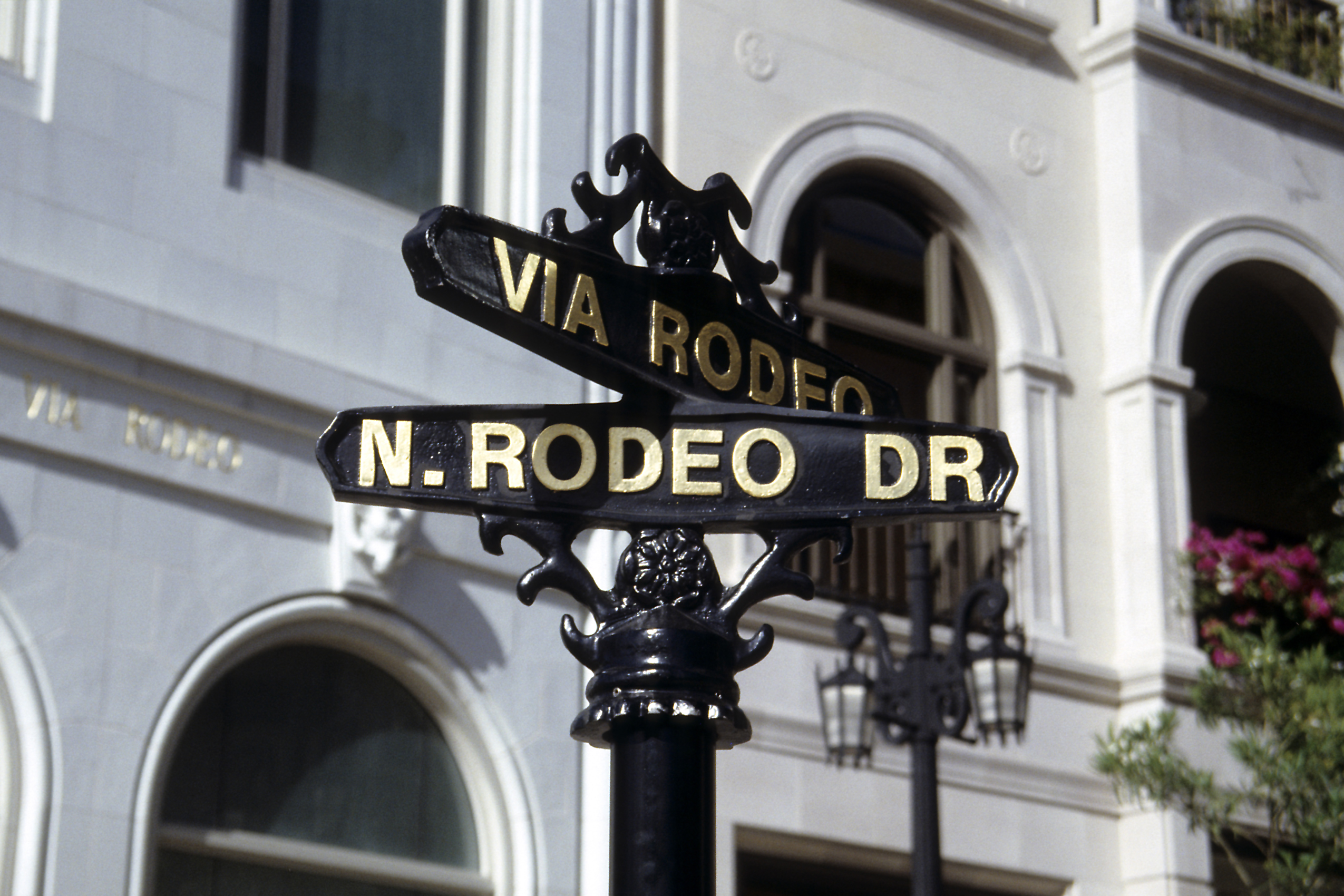
Rodeo Drive street sign

The central part of Rodeo eventually became a business street with hardware stores, gas stations, beauty shops, and bookstores. The men's store Carroll & Company opened shop on Rodeo Drive in 1950. The Anderton Court Shops building at 332 N. Rodeo was designed by Frank Lloyd Wright in 1952. In 1958, real estate developer Marvin Kratter bought 48,000 square feet (4,500 m^{2}) of land at the corner of Rodeo and Wilshire Boulevard from the city of Beverly Hills. The acreage is across the street from the Beverly Wilshire Hotel and Kratter paid something over $2 million for it.

=== Origin of a new image ===
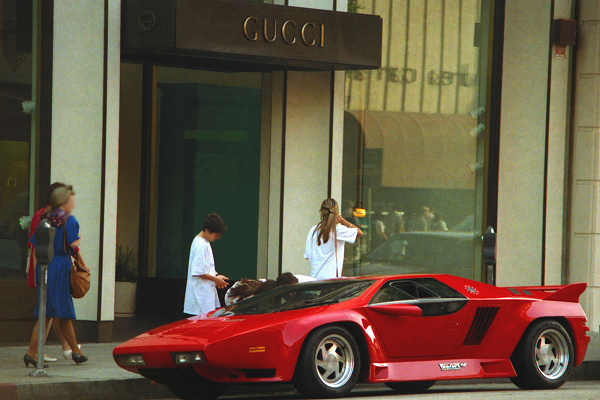
A Vector W8 parked in front of the Gucci store

In 1961 Fred Hayman, "the father of Rodeo Drive," opened Giorgio Beverly Hills, the street's first high-end boutique. In 1968 Aldo Gucci opened a store on Rodeo, which catalyzed the process by which the street took on its present form. Van Cleef & Arpels opened in 1969, followed by a Vidal Sassoon salon in 1970. The Polo Store, the brand's first freestanding store, opened in 1971.

According to a former co-chair of the "Rodeo Drive Committee," Richard Carroll, the transformation of Rodeo Drive into an international center of fashionable shopping was sparked in 1971 with the opening of a new wing of the Beverly Wilshire. In 1980 Carroll noted that before then "There was nothing at all of an international nature on the street. Rodeo was purely local in flavor." In 1977 the Rodeo Drive Committee "launched a publicity campaign designed to make everyone around the world think of Rodeo Drive as the shopping street of the rich and famous." The RDC wanted to make Rodeo Drive an economic engine for Beverly Hills and spread the image of a "culturally elite lifestyle."

In 1976, Bijan Pakzad opened a showroom on Rodeo, which helped to solidify "Rodeo Drive's reputation as a luxury shopping destination." Pakzad touted his Rodeo Drive store as "the most expensive in the world," but, as Women's Wear Daily notes in relation to the claim, "he was known for hyperbole." By 1978 the Beverly Hills Chamber of Commerce was boasting that Rodeo Drive was "the essence of the best of all the shopping centers of the world" and by 1980 the city of Beverly Hills estimated that the Rodeo Drive shopping district accounted for as much as 25% of its sales tax revenues.

=== International fashion centre ===
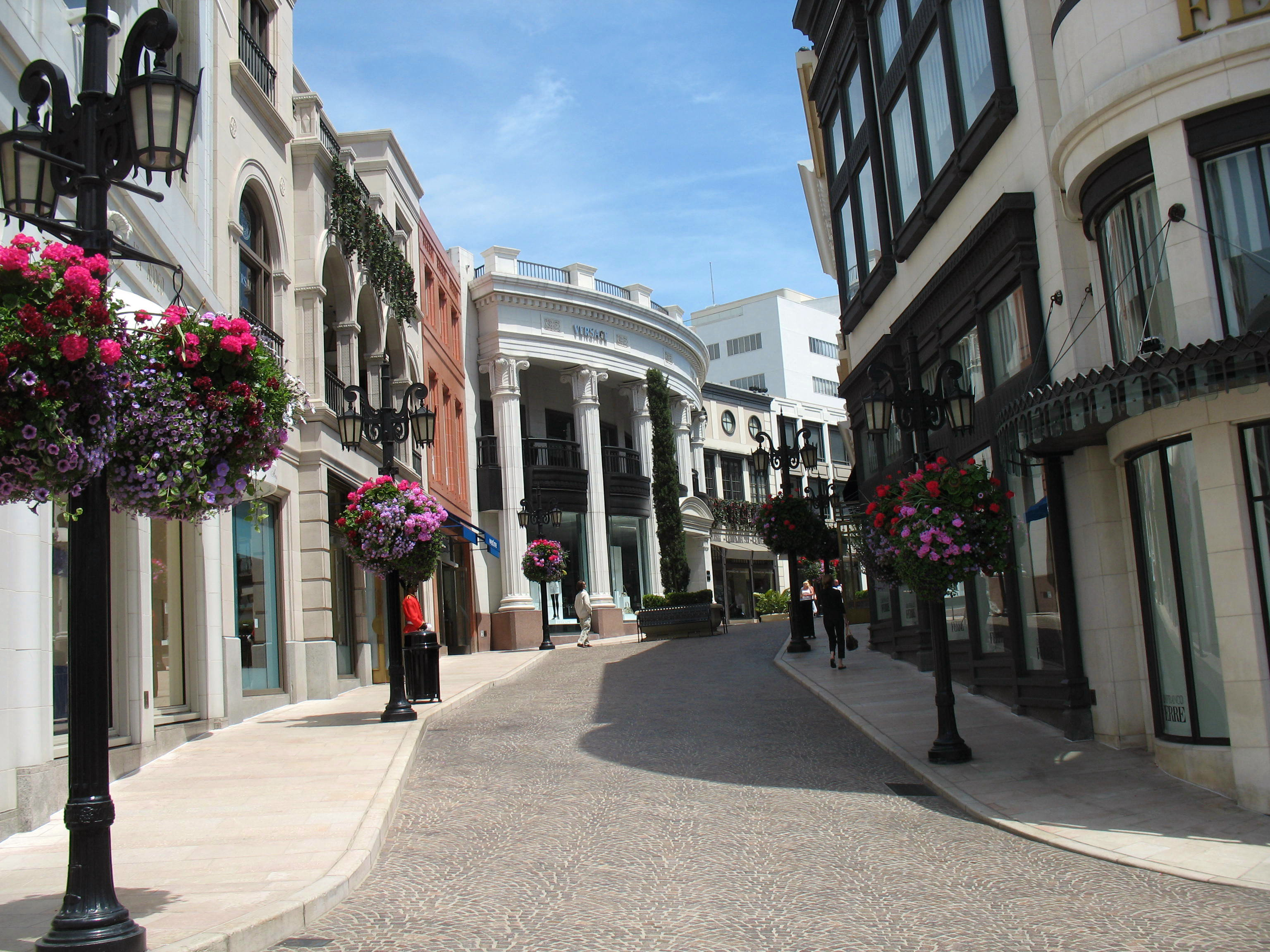
European-style buildings on Two Rodeo Drive

By 1981, the high-fashion strip took up only two and a half blocks, with around 65 stores.

The "Rodeo Collection," a 45-store, 70,000-square-foot (6,500 m^{2}) shopping mall opened in 1983 at 421 N. Rodeo Drive. The building is only four stories high with the first floor below street level in order to satisfy local building codes. The retail space initially leased for as much as $120 per square foot, which, according to an executive with commercial real estate firm Julien J. Studley, was "the highest price for any kind of space in the Los Angeles Area."

In the early 1990s, Rodeo Drive was ranked 4th most-visited destination in the Los Angeles area (after Disneyland, Knott's Berry Farm and Universal Studios).

Two Rodeo Drive, another outdoor shopping center, was built in 1990. It initially housed, amongst other stores, Christian Dior and Valentino. The original developer, Douglas Stitzel, sold the property for about $200 million immediately after its completion. Two Japanese groups, Kowa Real Estate California Inc. and USA Sogo Inc, bought 40% of Two Rodeo Drive.

The Two Rodeo Drive shopping center was hard-hit by the early 1990s recession, with occupancy rates dropping to as low as 60%. Middle-market brand boutiques such as Guess Jeans and Banana Republic opened on Rodeo Drive. Many franchised stores were bought back by the brands they represented (Polo Ralph Lauren, Gianni Versace, Hugo Boss).

The Two Rodeo Drive buyers sold it at an almost $70 million loss in 2000. By 2007 the property was financially stable again and was sold to a group of Irish investors for $275 million. It resembles a "faux-European shopping alley" and features a cobblestone street. Some architects have claimed that Two Rodeo Drive is similar to a "theme park in the manner of Disneyland."

=== Walk of Style ===
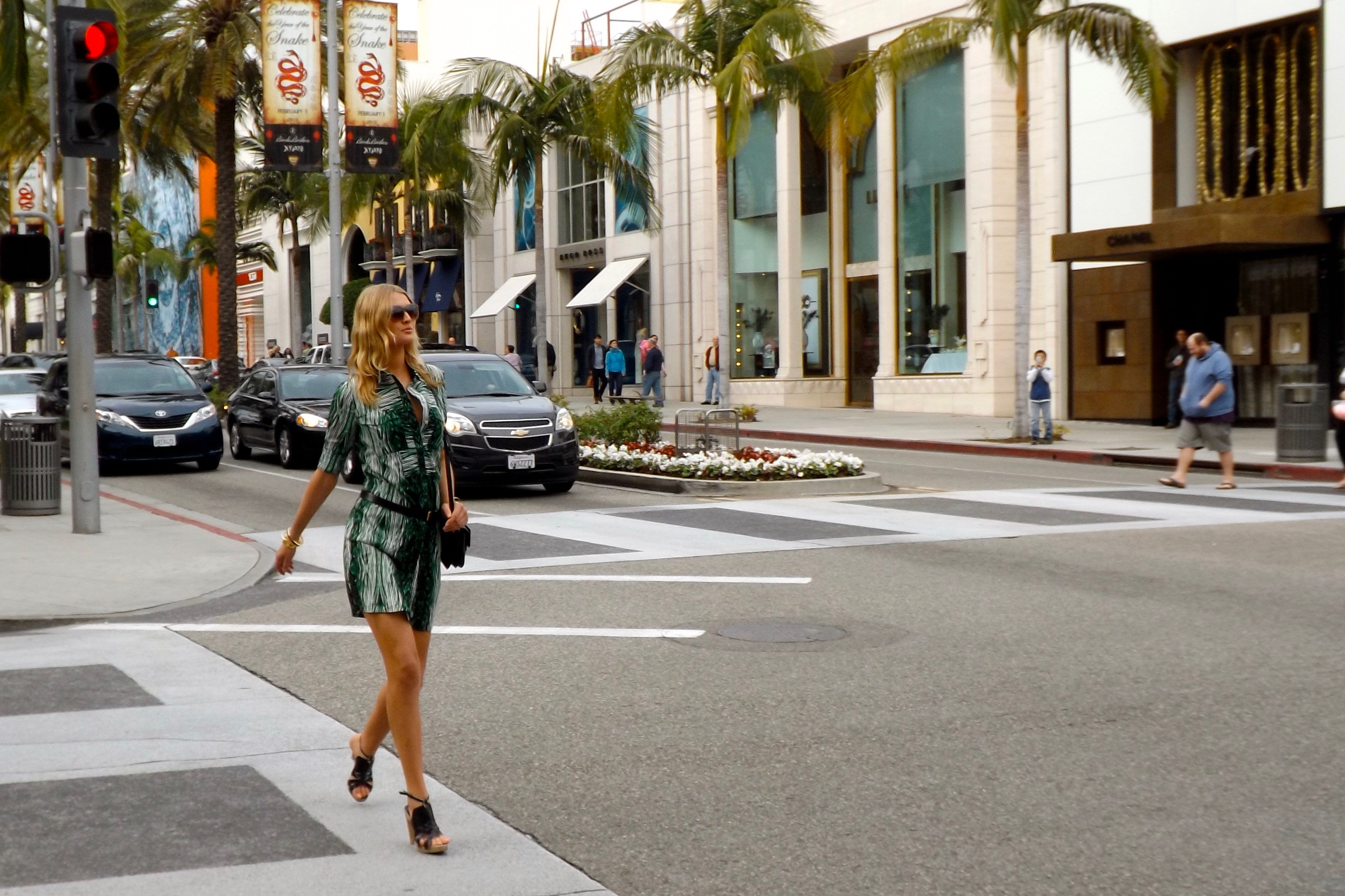
A model crosses Brighton Way at Rodeo Drive during a photo shoot in 2013.

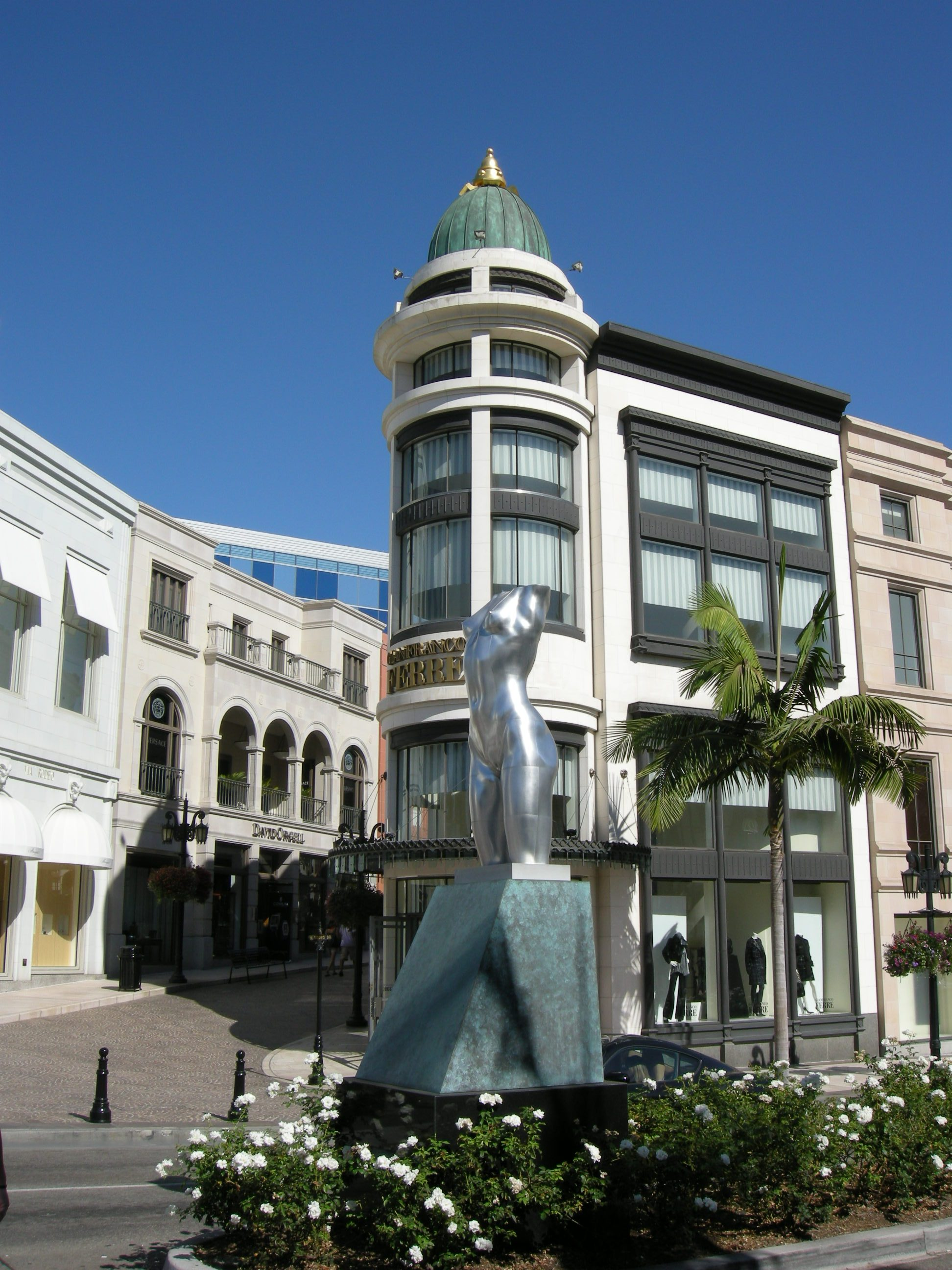
A "Torso" sculpture featured on Rodeo Drive

In 2003, Rodeo Drive was given an $18 million makeover which included widening the streets and the addition of crosswalks. The ficus trees lining the street were taken out and replaced with palm trees. In September of the same year, the Rodeo Drive Committee developed the Rodeo Drive Walk of Style. The Walk of Style features plaques set in the sidewalks along Rodeo Drive. Fashion icons are honored with the award for their work in style and fashion. At the intersection of Rodeo Drive and Dayton Way is the nude sculpture entitled "Torso." This statue was created by sculptor Robert Graham and is the symbol for the Rodeo Drive Walk of Style. Recipients of the Rodeo Drive Walk of Style Award receive a "Torso" maquette also designed by artist Robert Graham.

The French fashion firm Lanvin opened a store on Rodeo Drive in 2011.

=== 2020 lootings ===
In May 2020, several of Rodeo Drive's businesses were damaged and looted following the murder of George Floyd. It was reported that several windows were broken and many of the looted buildings were vandalized by spray paint.

== Events ==
- Rodeo Drive Concours d'Elegance: occurs annually every Father's Day on Rodeo Drive to exhibit some of the world's most expensive automobiles.
- Fashion’s Night Out: Created in 2009 in New York City in hopes of boosting the economy during the recession. Its goals were to "celebrate fashion, restore consumer confidence and boost the industry’s economy." In 2012, 500 cities across the United States (including Los Angeles), as well as 30 cities around the world adopted the event. It is held annually in September on the same night worldwide. The carnival features a 60-foot Ferris wheel and other attractions on the three blocks of the Rodeo Drive business district.
- Rodeo Drive Festival of Watches and Jewelry.

== Notable people ==
- William Boyd and Elinor Fair, film actors, married to each other
- Nicole Brown and O. J. Simpson first met at Jack Hanson's Rodeo Drive nightclub, The Daisy, when Brown worked there as a waitress
- Tod Browning, film actor, director, and screenwriter (corner of Rodeo Drive and Cañon Drive)
- Ralph Forbes, film actor (606 Rodeo Drive)

== In popular culture ==
- In the 1990 movie Pretty Woman, the young sex worker Vivian Ward (Julia Roberts) steps in a Rodeo Drive boutique where she gets snubbed by the sales clerks.
- The song "Down Rodeo" by Rage Against the Machine is titled after the street and refers to "Rolling down Rodeo with a shotgun"
- In the 2011 movie Just Go with It, plastic surgeon Dr. Danny Maccabee (Adam Sandler) takes his assistant Katherine (Jennifer Aniston) on a shopping spree down Rodeo Drive, after agreeing to pretend to be his wife, who will soon be divorced.
- In the 1994 movie D2: The Mighty Ducks, four of the members of the team visit Rodeo Drive. After playing pranks along the street they gain access to one of the boutiques before getting kicked out.
- Billy Ray Cyrus references driving down Rodeo Drive in the 2019 remix of Little Nas X’s single "Old Town Road", which topped the Billboard Hot 100 for a record 19 consecutive weeks.
- In the 2004 video game, Grand Theft Auto: San Andreas, a parodied version of the street is present in the fictional city of Los Santos.
- In the 2013 video game, Grand Theft Auto V, a redesigned parody of Rodeo Drive is present, called Portola Drive, in the fictional neighborhood of Rockford Hills, in Los Santos.
- In the 2019 mobile game Mario Kart Tour, Rodeo Drive is briefly driven through in the "Los Angeles Laps" race course.
- In the track "Hot Girl (Bodies Bodies Bodies)" from the soundtrack for the 2022 film Bodies Bodies Bodies, Charli XCX names Rodeo Drive as a preferred shopping location.
- In "The New Workout Plan" on Kanye West’s debut album The College Dropout, one of the woman snippets includes a mention of Rodeo Drive, saying she’s now able to shop there.
- In "Unholy" by Sam Smith and Kim Petras the line "You gonna need to bag it up because I'm spending on Rodeo"
- In the chorus of "Whatever She Wants" by Bryson Tiller, he says "I'ma take her bougie ass to Rodeo and then let her pick up whatever she wants" in reference to Rodeo Drive.

== See also ==
- List of leading shopping streets and districts by city
- Luxe Rodeo Drive Hotel
- Down Rodeo
