= Vicente Wolf =

Cuban-American interior designer

- Born: Vicente E. Wolf; January 19, 1945 (age 81); Cuba
- Occupations: Interior designer, photography collector
- Employer: Vicente Wolf Associates

Vicente E. Wolf (born January 19, 1945) is a Cuban-born American interior designer based in Manhattan. He is the head of Vicente Wolf Associates. He has designed hotels, private residences, and furniture.

== Early life and education ==
Vicente Wolf was born in Cuba and lived there until he was fifteen years old. He did not graduate from high school. He moved to New York City at the age of eighteen. He first worked in advertising, modeling, and acting. Shortly after, he decided to take up interior designing; he is self-taught. His influences include Philippe Starck and Karl Lagerfeld.

== Career ==
Wolf started his career as an interior designer in New York City in the 1970s. He is a proponent of minimalism, especially High-tech. Indeed, Architectural Digest has called him "an undisputed minimalist master." However, he rejects the label 'minimalism.'

He has designed hotels such as Lorien Hotel & Spa in Alexandria, Virginia and the Luxe Rodeo Drive Hotel in Beverly Hills, California. He has also designed Café Rodeo in Beverly Hills, the Bedell Cellars Winery in North Fork, the L'Impero and Alto restaurants in New York City, and the LS Store in Hong Kong. He has also designed private residences, including the penthouses at Manhattan House, a building at 200 east 66th street in Manhattan.

He owns an interior design store, VW Home, in Manhattan. Moreover, since 2007, he has designed furniture for Ralph Pucci, known as the Vicente Wolf Collection. He is also a designer for Ann Sachs, Baccarat and Tufenkian.

He has written five books on interior design and one on the legendary Mexican artist, Frida Kahlo. Additionally, he has taught at the Parsons School of Design in New York City and a design school in the Dominican Republic. He is the 2009 recipient of the Design Icon Award.

== Personal life ==
He resides in a loft in Manhattan. A photography collector, he owns Frida Kahlo's family albums.

== Bibliography ==
- Learning to See: Bringing the World Around You Into Your Home (Artisan, 2002).
- Crossing Boundaries: A Global Vision of Design (The Monacelli Press, 2010).
- Lifting the Curtain on Design (The Monacelli Press, 2010).
- Frida Kahlo: Photographs of Myself and Others (Pointed Leaf Press, 2010).
- The Four Elements of Design: Interiors Inspired by Earth, Water, Air and Fire (Rizzoli, 2016).
- Creative Interior Solutions (Rizzoli, 2023).
